= Subprime mortgage crisis =

2007 mortgage crisis in the United States

Mortgage delinquencies (missed payments) began rapidly rising from 2007. A continuous buildup of toxic assets in the form of subprime mortgages acted as a catalyst for the Great Recession in the United States.

The American subprime mortgage crisis was a multinational financial crisis that occurred between 2007 and 2010, contributing to the 2008 financial crisis. It led to a severe economic recession, with millions becoming unemployed and many businesses going bankrupt. The U.S. government intervened with a series of measures to stabilize the financial system, including the Troubled Asset Relief Program (TARP) and the American Recovery and Reinvestment Act of 2009 (ARRA).

The collapse of the 2000s United States housing bubble and high interest rates led to unprecedented numbers of borrowers missing mortgage repayments and becoming delinquent. This ultimately led to mass foreclosures and the devaluation of housing-related securities. The housing bubble preceding the crisis was financed with mortgage-backed securities (MBSes) and collateralized debt obligations (CDOs), which initially offered higher interest rates (i.e., better returns) than government securities, along with attractive risk ratings from rating agencies. Despite being highly rated, most of these financial instruments were made up of high-risk subprime mortgages.

While elements of the crisis first became more visible during 2007, several major financial institutions collapsed in late 2008, with significant disruption in the flow of credit to businesses and consumers and the onset of a severe global recession. Most notably, Lehman Brothers, a major mortgage lender, filed for bankruptcy in September 2008. There were many causes of the crisis, with commentators assigning different levels of blame to financial institutions, regulators, credit agencies, government housing policies, and consumers, among others. Two proximate causes were the rise in subprime lending and the increase in housing speculation. Investors, even those with "prime", or low-risk, credit ratings, were much more likely to default than non-investors when prices fell. These changes were part of a broader trend of lowered lending standards and higher-risk mortgage products, which contributed to U.S. households becoming increasingly indebted.

The crisis had severe, long-lasting consequences for the U.S. and European economies. The U.S. entered a deep recession, with nearly 9 million jobs lost during 2008 and 2009, roughly 6% of the workforce. The number of jobs did not return to the December 2007 pre-crisis peak until May 2014. U.S. household net worth declined by nearly $13 trillion (20%) from its Q2 2007 pre-crisis peak, recovering by Q4 2012. U.S. housing prices fell nearly 30% on average and the U.S. stock market fell approximately 50% by early 2009, with stocks regaining their December 2007 level during September 2012. One estimate of lost output and income from the crisis comes to "at least 40% of 2007 gross domestic product". Europe also continued to struggle with its own economic crisis, with elevated unemployment and severe banking impairments estimated at €940 billion between 2008 and 2012. As of January 2018, U.S. bailout funds had been fully recovered by the government, when interest on loans is taken into consideration. A total of $626B was invested, loaned, or granted due to various bailout measures, while $390B had been returned to the Treasury. The Treasury had earned another $323B in interest on bailout loans, resulting in a $109B profit as of January 2021.

== Background and timeline of events ==
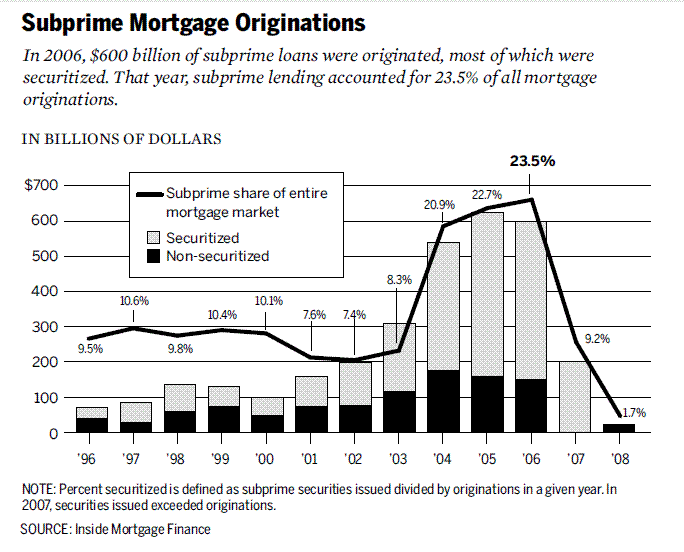
Subprime mortgage lending jumped dramatically during the 2004–2006 period preceding the crisis.

The immediate cause of the crisis was the bursting of the United States housing bubble which peaked in approximately 2006. An increase in loan incentives such as easy initial terms and a long-term trend of rising housing prices had encouraged borrowers to assume risky mortgages in the anticipation that they would be able to quickly refinance at easier terms. However, once interest rates began to rise and housing prices started to drop moderately in 2006–2007 in many parts of the U.S., borrowers were unable to refinance. Defaults and foreclosure activity increased dramatically as easy initial terms expired, home prices fell, and adjustable-rate mortgage (ARM) interest rates reset higher.

As housing prices fell, global investor demand for mortgage-related securities evaporated. This became apparent by July 2007, when investment bank Bear Stearns announced that two of its hedge funds had imploded. These funds had invested in securities that derived their value from mortgages. When the value of these securities dropped, lenders demanded that these hedge funds provide additional collateral. This created a cascade of selling in these securities, which lowered their value further. Economist Mark Zandi wrote that this 2007 event was "arguably the proximate catalyst" for the financial market disruption that followed.

Several other factors set the stage for the rise and fall of housing prices, and related securities widely held by financial firms. In the years leading up to the crisis, the U.S. received large amounts of foreign money from fast-growing economies in Asia and oil-producing/exporting countries. This inflow of funds combined with low U.S. interest rates from 2002 to 2004 contributed to easy credit conditions, which fueled both housing and credit bubbles. Loans of various types (e.g., mortgage, credit card, and auto) were easy to obtain and consumers assumed an unprecedented debt load.

As part of the housing and credit booms, the number of financial agreements called mortgage-backed securities (MBS), which derive their value from mortgage payments and housing prices, greatly increased. Such financial innovation enabled institutions and investors worldwide to invest in the U.S. housing market. As housing prices declined, major global financial institutions that had borrowed and invested heavily in MBS reported significant losses. Defaults and losses on other loan types also increased significantly as the crisis expanded from the housing market to other parts of the economy. Total losses were estimated in the trillions of U.S. dollars globally.

While the housing and credit bubbles were growing, a series of factors caused the financial system to become increasingly fragile. Policymakers did not recognize the increasingly important role played by financial institutions such as investment banks and hedge funds, also known as the shadow banking system. These entities were not subject to the same regulations as depository banking. Further, shadow banks were able to mask the extent of their risk taking from investors and regulators through the use of complex, off-balance sheet derivatives and securitizations. Economist Gary Gorton has referred to the 2007–2008 aspects of the crisis as a "run" on the shadow banking system.

The complexity of these off-balance sheet arrangements and the securities held, as well as the interconnection between larger financial institutions, made it virtually impossible to re-organize them via bankruptcy, which contributed to the need for government bailouts. Some experts believe these shadow institutions had become as important as commercial (depository) banks in providing credit to the U.S. economy, but they were not subject to the same regulations. These institutions as well as certain regulated banks had also assumed significant debt burdens while providing the loans described above and did not have a financial cushion sufficient to absorb large loan defaults or MBS losses.

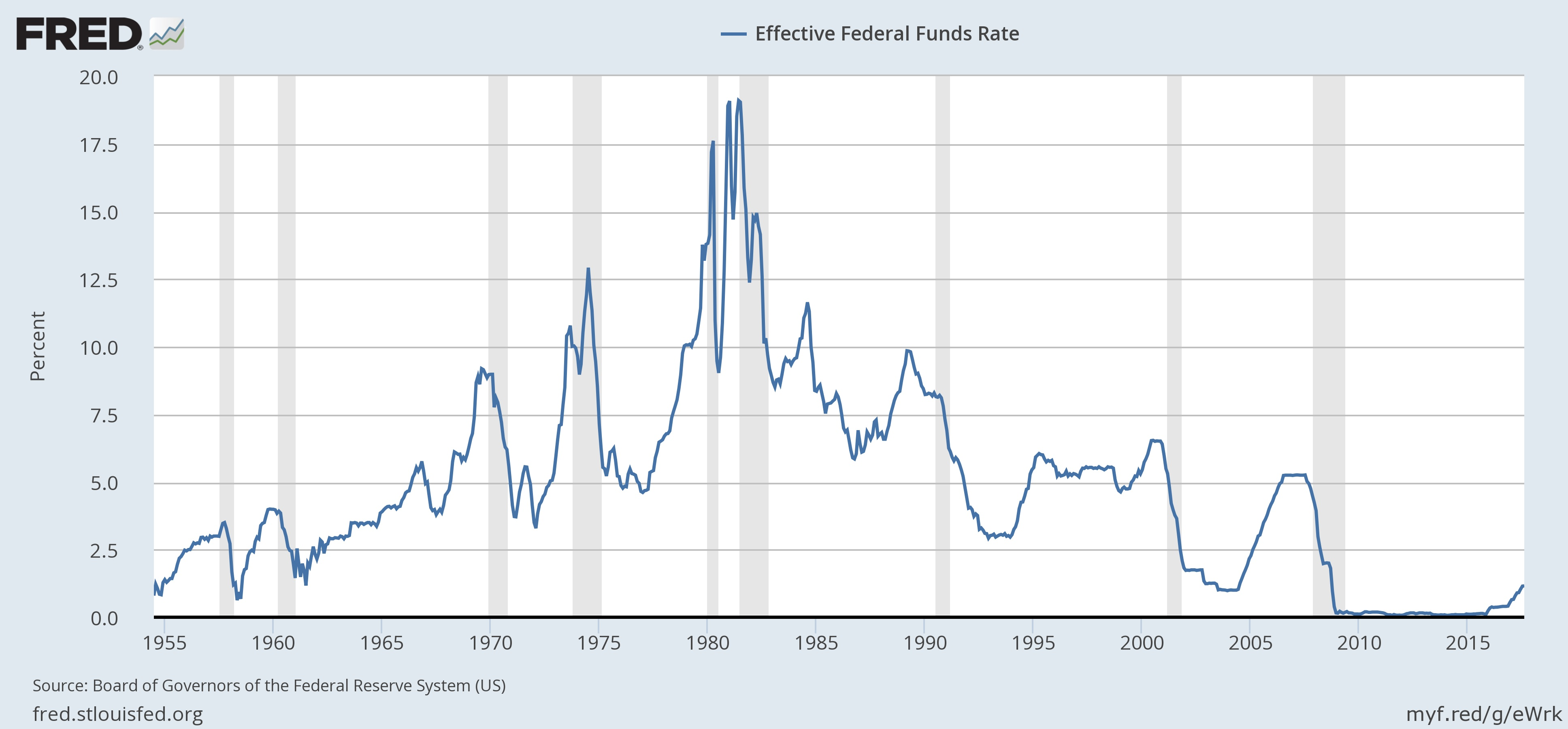
Federal funds rate history and recessions

The losses experienced by financial institutions on their mortgage-related securities impacted their ability to lend, slowing economic activity. Interbank lending dried up initially and then loans to non-financial firms were affected. Concerns regarding the stability of key financial institutions drove central banks to take action to provide funds to encourage lending and to restore faith in the commercial paper markets, which are integral to funding business operations. Governments also bailed out key financial institutions, assuming significant additional financial commitments.

The risks to the broader economy created by the housing market downturn and subsequent financial market crisis were primary factors in several decisions by central banks around the world to cut interest rates and governments to implement economic stimulus packages. Effects on global stock markets due to the crisis were dramatic. Between January 1 and October 11, 2008, owners of stocks in U.S. corporations suffered about $8 trillion in losses, as their holdings declined in value from $20 trillion to $12 trillion. Losses in other countries averaged about 40%.

Losses in the stock markets and housing value declines place further downward pressure on consumer spending, a key economic engine. Leaders of the larger developed and emerging nations met in November 2008 and March 2009 to formulate strategies for addressing the crisis. A variety of solutions were proposed by government officials, central bankers, economists, and business executives. In the U.S., the Dodd–Frank Wall Street Reform and Consumer Protection Act was signed into law in July 2010 to address some of the causes of the crisis.

== Causes ==
=== Overview ===
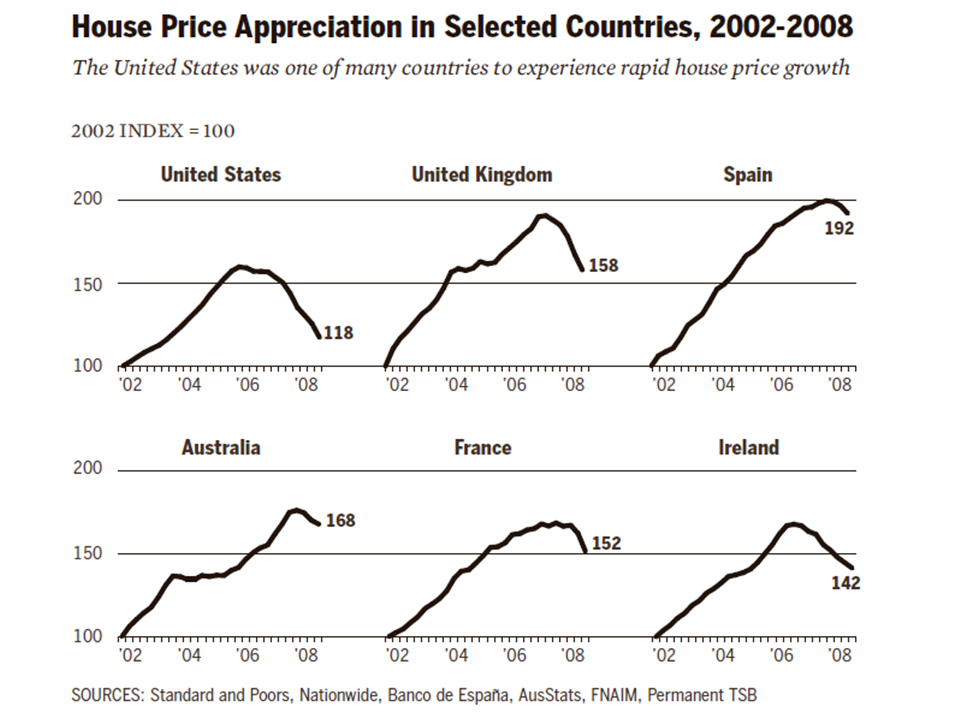
Housing price appreciation in selected countries, 2002–2008

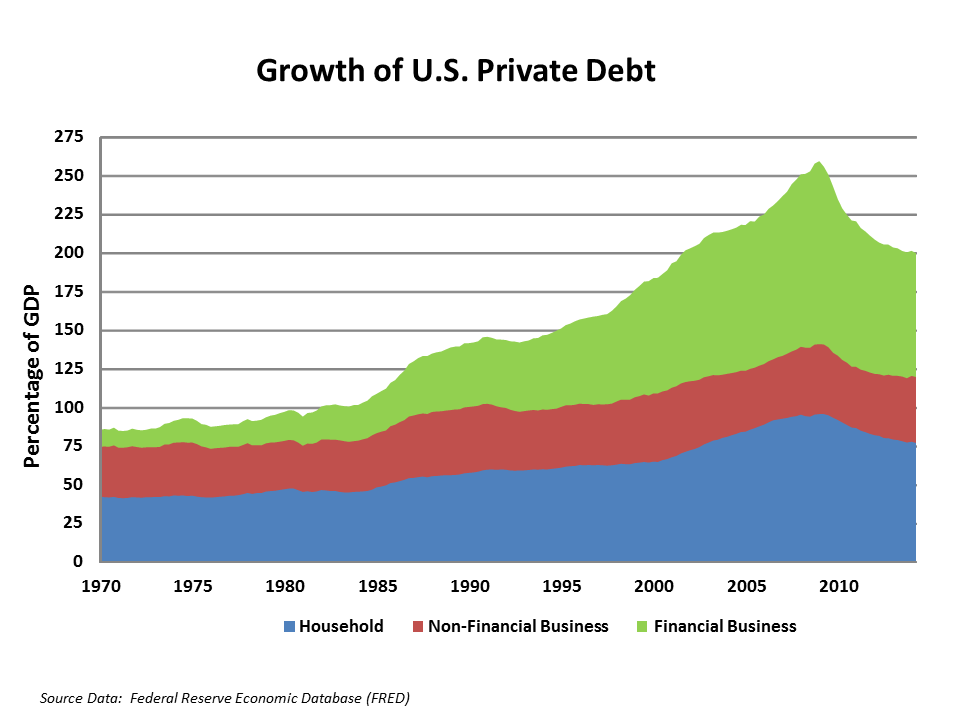
U.S. households and financial businesses significantly increased borrowing (leverage) in the years leading up to the crisis.

The crisis can be attributed to several factors, which emerged over a number of years. Causes proposed include the inability of homeowners to make their mortgage payments (due primarily to adjustable-rate mortgages resetting, borrowers overextending, predatory lending, and speculation), overbuilding during the boom period, risky mortgage products, increased power of mortgage originators, high personal and corporate debt levels, financial products that distributed and perhaps concealed the risk of mortgage default, monetary and housing policies that encouraged risk-taking and more debt, international trade imbalances, and inappropriate and insufficient government regulation. Excessive consumer housing debt was in turn caused by the mortgage-backed security, credit default swap, and collateralized debt obligation sub-sectors of the finance industry, which were offering irrationally low interest rates and irrationally high levels of approval to subprime mortgage consumers due in part to faulty financial models. Debt consumers were acting in their rational self-interest, because they were unable to audit the finance industry's opaque faulty risk pricing methodology.

Among the important catalysts of the subprime crisis were the influx of money from the private sector, the banks entering into the mortgage bond market, government policies aimed at expanding homeownership, speculation by many home buyers, and the predatory lending practices of the mortgage lenders, specifically the adjustable-rate mortgage, 2–28 loan, that mortgage lenders sold directly or indirectly via mortgage brokers. On Wall Street and in the financial industry, moral hazard lay at the core of many of the causes.

In its "Declaration of the Summit on Financial Markets and the World Economy", dated November 15, 2008, leaders of the Group of 20 cited the following causes:

During a period of strong global growth, growing capital flows, and prolonged stability earlier this decade, market participants sought higher yields without an adequate appreciation of the risks and failed to exercise proper due diligence. At the same time, weak underwriting standards, unsound risk management practices, increasingly complex and opaque financial products, and consequent excessive leverage combined to create vulnerabilities in the system. Policy-makers, regulators and supervisors, in some advanced countries, did not adequately appreciate and address the risks building up in financial markets, keep pace with financial innovation, or take into account the systemic ramifications of domestic regulatory actions.

Federal Reserve Chair Ben Bernanke testified in September 2010 regarding the causes of the crisis. He wrote that there were shocks or triggers (i.e., particular events that touched off the crisis) and vulnerabilities (i.e., structural weaknesses in the financial system, regulation and supervision) that amplified the shocks. Examples of triggers included: losses on subprime mortgage securities that began in 2007 and a run on the shadow banking system that began in mid-2007, which adversely affected the functioning of money markets. Examples of vulnerabilities in the private sector included: financial institution dependence on unstable sources of short-term funding such as repurchase agreements or repos; deficiencies in corporate risk management; excessive use of leverage (borrowing to invest); and inappropriate usage of derivatives as a tool for taking excessive risks. Examples of vulnerabilities in the public sector included: statutory gaps and conflicts between regulators; ineffective use of regulatory authority; and ineffective crisis management capabilities. Bernanke also discussed "Too big to fail" institutions, monetary policy, and trade deficits.

During May 2010, Warren Buffett and Paul Volcker separately described questionable assumptions or judgments underlying the U.S. financial and economic system that contributed to the crisis. These assumptions included: 1) Housing prices would not fall dramatically; 2) Free and open financial markets supported by sophisticated financial engineering would most effectively support market efficiency and stability, directing funds to the most profitable and productive uses; 3) Concepts embedded in mathematics and physics could be directly adapted to markets, in the form of various financial models used to evaluate credit risk; 4) Economic imbalances, such as large trade deficits and low savings rates indicative of over-consumption, were sustainable; and 5) Stronger regulation of the shadow banking system and derivatives markets was not needed. Economists surveyed by the University of Chicago during 2017 rated the factors that caused the crisis in order of importance: 1) Flawed financial sector regulation and supervision; 2) Underestimating risks in financial engineering (e.g., CDOs); 3) Mortgage fraud and bad incentives; 4) Short-term funding decisions and corresponding runs in those markets (e.g., repo); and 5) Credit rating agency failures.

The real estate bubble was initially fueled by a global pool of reserves valued at approximately U.S.$70 trillion. A significant portion of these reserves was utilized by investment banks to purchase securities like mortgage-backed securities (MBSes). MBSes, for example, are derivatives where the issuing banks would secure loans from commercial banks to finance home purchases. To refinance these loans, the banks would seek funding, often drawing on savings from their clients. MBSes, tied to the real estate sector, became highly attractive financial assets during the housing boom. Both individual investors and financial institutions largely ignored the risks associated with these securities. Their value rose steadily, creating a perception of security and profitability. However, when the housing market faltered, the value of MBSes plummeted, leading to significant financial losses and a cascading crisis.

This misjudgment of risk, combined with excessive reliance on credit and financial engineering, created the conditions for the eventual collapse, illustrating the vulnerabilities of a system heavily dependent on inflated asset values. Another critical factor in the subprime mortgage crisis was the precarious financial position of major investment banks. The ratio of their leverage ratios was alarmingly low, in some cases reaching 1:40. This meant that for every dollar of equity, these banks owed $40. Such extreme leverage made them highly vulnerable to even minor fluctuations in asset values.

These investment banks poured significant resources into MBSes, gambling heavily on the assumption that real estate prices would continue to rise indefinitely. Commercial banks, in turn, loaned substantial sums to individuals and to investment banks involved in issuing these risky MBSes. However, the investment banks failed to properly assess the future value of these financial assets. It was not just a matter of credit expansion but also of widespread overconfidence and naivety—individuals and institutions alike were convinced that the housing bubble would persist.

The situation was exacerbated by the deregulation of over-the-counter (OTC) derivatives markets. These markets allowed for the creation and trade of complex financial derivatives, many of which were tied to the real estate sector and, in some cases, to foreign exchange markets. These derivatives often lacked transparency and their behavior was poorly predicted, yet their trade still proliferated in the unregulated OTC markets. The sheer volume of derivatives became staggering, with their total value exceeding the global GDP by more than tenfold. Many of these derivatives were backed by high-risk assets like MBSes and CDOs, further compounding the instability of the financial system.

The unregulated creation and trade of derivatives, combined with excessive leverage and misplaced confidence in the housing market, were equally significant contributors. These factors created a fragile financial structure that was doomed to collapse once the bubble burst. Before the subprime crisis, an excessive number of houses were constructed, and resources were disproportionately allocated to the real estate sector. Investment banks issued MBS at unprecedented levels, fueled by the housing boom. Meanwhile, many non-financial corporations prioritized stock buybacks, dividend payments, and speculative investments over reinvesting in productive capital and expanding employment. In some cases, these corporations even incurred debt to finance these financial maneuvers, further diverting resources away from productive sectors.

The globalized nature of the modern economy amplifies the effects of crises. When major economies like the U.S. or China experience downturns, the impact spreads worldwide, leading to business defaults, rising unemployment, and economic contraction. Compounding this is the phenomenon of financialization, where banks and non-financial corporations prioritize investments in financial instruments like stocks, derivatives, and bonds over productive investments.

A significant portion of the funds used to finance MBSes and other home purchases originated from global savings, not solely from central bank credit expansion. These savings (which amounted to U.S.$70 trillion in total worldwide liquidity) came not just from within the United States but from international sources as well, like China and other Asian developing economies.

This shift in economic focus led to a decrease in the production of both capital and consumer goods in Western economies. Outsourcing and risky financial strategies further exacerbated this trend. Credit expansion primarily benefited the real estate sector, leaving other productive parts of the economy underfunded.

The U.S. Financial Crisis Inquiry Commission reported its findings in January 2011. It concluded that "the crisis was avoidable and was caused by: Widespread failures in financial regulation, including the Federal Reserve's failure to stem the tide of toxic mortgages; Dramatic breakdowns in corporate governance including too many financial firms acting recklessly and taking on too much risk; An explosive mix of excessive borrowing and risk by households and Wall Street that put the financial system on a collision course with crisis; Key policy makers ill prepared for the crisis, lacking a full understanding of the financial system they oversaw; and systemic breaches in accountability and ethics at all levels."

=== Narratives ===
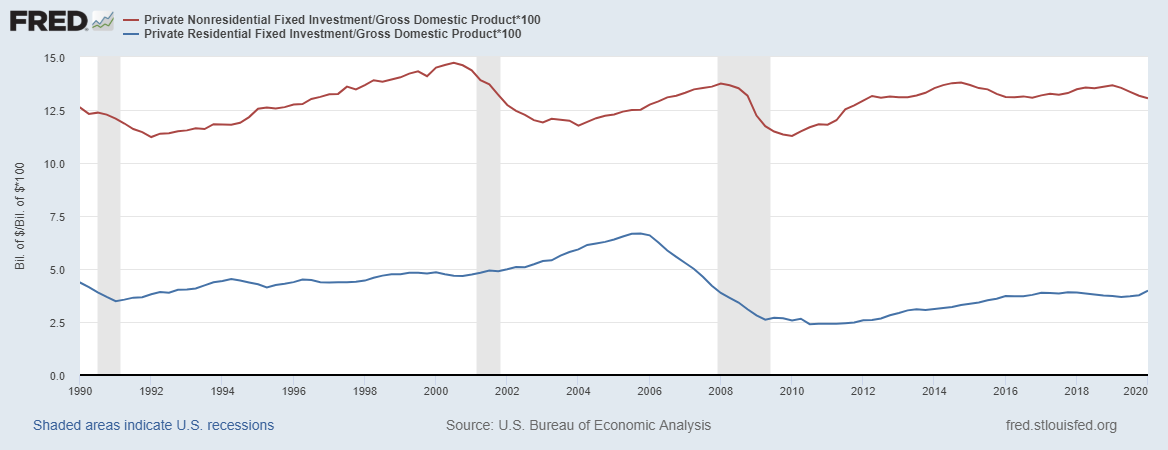
U.S. residential and non-residential investment fell relative to GDP during the crisis.

There are several "narratives" attempting to place the causes of the crisis into context, with overlapping elements. Five such narratives include:

1. There was the equivalent of a bank run on the shadow banking system, which includes investment banks and other non-depository financial entities. This system had grown to rival the depository system in scale yet was not subject to the same regulatory safeguards.
2. The economy was being driven by a housing bubble. When it burst, private residential investment (i.e., housing construction) fell by nearly 4% GDP and consumption enabled by bubble-generated housing wealth also slowed. This created a gap in annual demand (GDP) of nearly $1 trillion. Government was unwilling to make up for this private sector shortfall.
3. Record levels of household debt accumulated in the decades preceding the crisis resulted in a balance sheet recession (similar to debt deflation) once housing prices began falling in 2006. Consumers began paying down debt, which reduces their consumption, slowing down the economy for an extended period while debt levels are reduced.
4. Housing speculation using high levels of mortgage debt drove many investors with prime-quality mortgages (i.e., those investors in the middle of the credit score distribution) to default and enter foreclosure on investment properties when housing prices fell; the blame on "subprime" homeowners (i.e., those at the bottom of the credit score distribution) was overstated.
5. Government policies that encouraged home ownership even for those who could not afford it, contributing to lax lending standards, unsustainable housing price increases, and indebtedness.

Underlying narratives #1-3 is a hypothesis that growing income inequality and wage stagnation encouraged families to increase their household debt to maintain their desired living standard, fueling the bubble. Further, this greater share of income flowing to the top increased the political power of business interests, who used that power to deregulate or limit regulation of the shadow banking system.

=== Housing market ===
==== Boom and bust ====
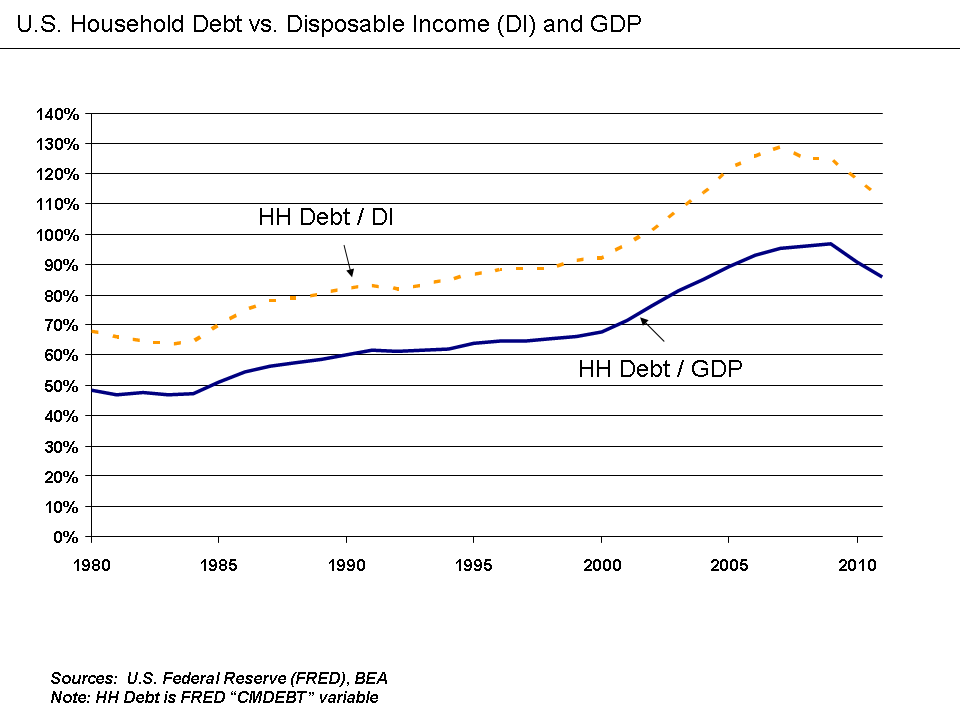
Household debt relative to disposable income and GDP

According to Robert J. Shiller and other economists, housing price increases beyond the general inflation rate are not sustainable in the long term. From the end of World War II to the beginning of the housing bubble in 1997, housing prices in the US remained relatively stable. The bubble was characterized by higher rates of household debt and lower savings rates, slightly higher rates of home ownership, and of course higher housing prices. It was fueled by low interest rates and large inflows of foreign funds that created easy credit conditions.

Between 1997 and 2006 (the peak of the housing bubble), the price of the typical American house increased by 124%. Many research articles confirmed the timeline of the U.S. housing bubble (emerged in 2002 and collapsed in 2006–2007) before the collapse of the subprime mortgage industry. From 1980 to 2001, the ratio of median home prices to median household income (a measure of ability to buy a house) fluctuated from 2.9 to 3.1. In 2004 it rose to 4.0, and by 2006 it hit 4.6. The housing bubble was more pronounced in coastal areas where the ability to build new housing was restricted by geography or land use restrictions. This housing bubble resulted in quite a few homeowners refinancing their homes at lower interest rates, or financing consumer spending by taking out second mortgages secured by the price appreciation. US household debt as a percentage of annual disposable personal income was 127% at the end of 2007, versus 77% in 1990.

While housing prices were increasing, consumers were saving less and both borrowing and spending more. Household debt grew from $705 billion in 1974, 60% of disposable personal income, to $7.4 trillion at the end of 2000, and finally to $14.5 trillion in the middle of 2008, 134% of disposable personal income. During 2008, the typical US household had 13 credit cards, with 40% of households carrying a balance, up from 6% in 1970.

Free cash used by consumers from home equity extraction doubled from $627 billion in 2001 to $1,428 billion in 2005 as the housing bubble built, a total of nearly $5 trillion over the period. U.S. home mortgage debt relative to GDP increased from an average of 46% during the 1990s to 73% during 2008, reaching $10.5 (~$15.4 trillion in 2025) trillion. From 2001 to 2007, U.S. mortgage debt almost doubled, and the amount of mortgage debt per household rose more than 63%, from $91,500 to $149,500, with essentially stagnant wages. Economist Tyler Cowen explained that the economy was highly dependent on this home equity extraction: "In the 1993–1997 period, home owners extracted an amount of equity from their homes equivalent to 2.3% to 3.8% GDP. By 2005, this figure had increased to 11.5% GDP."

This credit and house price explosion led to a building boom and eventually to a surplus of unsold homes, which caused U.S. housing prices to peak and begin declining in mid-2006. Easy credit, and a belief that house prices would continue to appreciate, had encouraged many subprime borrowers to obtain adjustable-rate mortgages. These mortgages enticed borrowers with a below market interest rate for some predetermined period, followed by market interest rates for the remainder of the mortgage's term.

The US home ownership rate increased from 64% in 1994 (about where it had been since 1980) to an all-time high of 69.2% in 2004. Subprime lending was a major contributor to this increase in home ownership rates and in the overall demand for housing, which drove prices higher.

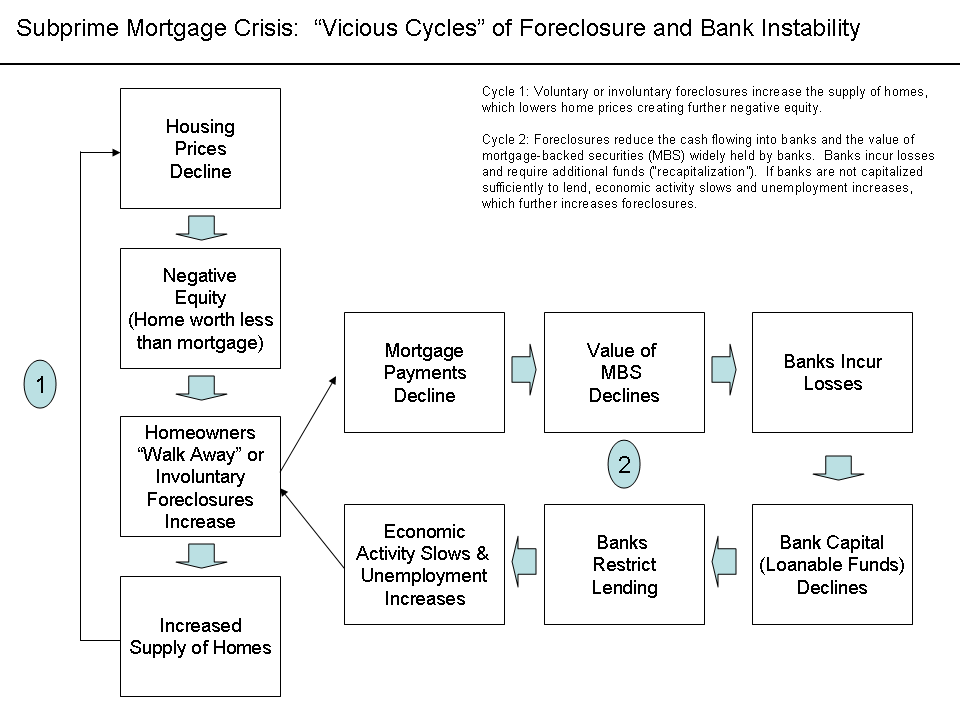
Vicious cycles in the housing and financial markets

Borrowers who would not be able to make the higher payments once the initial grace period ended, were planning to refinance their mortgages after a year or two of appreciation. As a result of the depreciating housing prices, borrowers' ability to refinance became more difficult. Borrowers who found themselves unable to escape higher monthly payments by refinancing began to default.

As more borrowers stopped making their mortgage payments, foreclosures and the supply of homes for sale increased. This placed downward pressure on housing prices, which further lowered homeowners' equity. The decline in mortgage payments also reduced the value of mortgage-backed securities, which eroded the net worth and financial health of banks. This vicious cycle was at the heart of the crisis.

By September 2008, average U.S. housing prices had declined by over 20% from their mid-2006 peak. This major and unexpected decline in house prices means that many borrowers have zero or negative equity in their homes, meaning their homes were worth less than their mortgages. As of March 2008, an estimated 8.8 million borrowers – 10.8% of all homeowners – had negative equity in their homes, a number that is believed to have risen to 12 million by November 2008. By September 2010, 23% of all U.S. homes were worth less than the mortgage loan.

Borrowers in this situation have an incentive to default on their mortgages as a mortgage is typically nonrecourse debt secured against the property. Economist Stan Leibowitz argued in The Wall Street Journal that although only 12% of homes had negative equity, they comprised 47% of foreclosures during the second half of 2008. He concluded that the extent of equity in the home was the key factor in foreclosure, rather than the type of loan, credit worthiness of the borrower, or ability to pay.

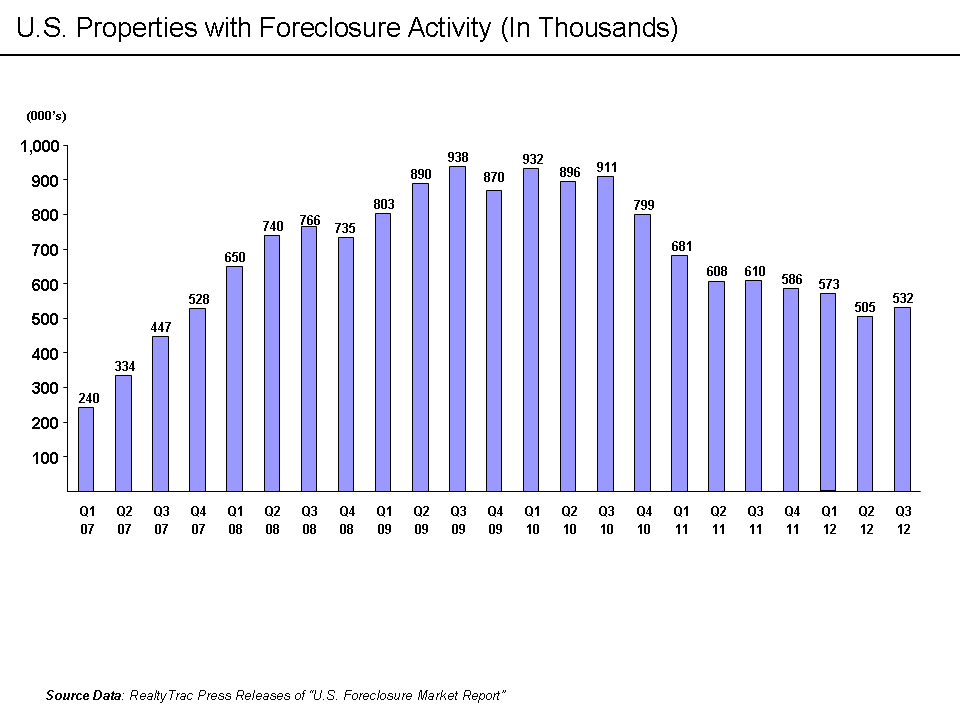
Number of U.S. residential properties subject to foreclosure actions by quarter (2007–2012)

Increasing foreclosure rates increases the inventory of houses offered for sale. The number of new homes sold in 2007 was 26.4% less than in the preceding year. By January 2008, the inventory of unsold new homes was 9.8 times the December 2007 sales volume, the highest value of this ratio since 1981. Furthermore, nearly four million existing homes were for sale, of which roughly 2.2 million were vacant.

This overhang of unsold homes lowered house prices. As prices declined, more homeowners were at risk of default or foreclosure. House prices are expected to continue declining until this inventory of unsold homes (an instance of excess supply) declines to normal levels. A report in January 2011 stated that U.S. home values dropped by 26% from their peak in June 2006 to November 2010, more than the 25.9% drop between 1928 and 1933 when the Great Depression occurred.

From September 2008 to September 2012, there were approximately 4 million completed foreclosures in the U.S. As of September 2012, approximately 1.4 million homes, or 3.3% of all homes with a mortgage, were in some stage of foreclosure compared to 1.5 million, or 3.5%, in September 2011. During September 2012, 57,000 homes completed foreclosure; this is down from 83,000 the prior September but well above the 2000–2006 average of 21,000 completed foreclosures per month.

==== Homeowner speculation ====
Speculative borrowing in residential real estate has been cited as a contributing factor to the subprime mortgage crisis. During 2006, 22% of homes purchased (1.65 million units) were for investment purposes, with an additional 14% (1.07 million units) purchased as vacation homes. During 2005, these figures were 28% and 12%, respectively. In other words, a record level of nearly 40% of homes purchased were not intended as primary residences. David Lereah, National Association of Realtors's chief economist at the time, stated that the 2006 decline in investment buying was expected: "Speculators left the market in 2006, which caused investment sales to fall much faster than the primary market."

Housing prices nearly doubled between 2000 and 2006, a vastly different trend from the historical appreciation at roughly the rate of inflation. While homes had not traditionally been treated as investments subject to speculation, this behavior changed during the housing boom. Media widely reported condominiums being purchased while under construction, then being "flipped" (sold) for a profit without the seller ever having lived in them. Some mortgage companies identified risks inherent in this activity as early as 2005, after identifying investors assuming highly leveraged positions in multiple properties.

One 2017 NBER study argued that real estate investors (i.e., those owning 2+ homes) were more to blame for the crisis than subprime borrowers: "The rise in mortgage defaults during the crisis was concentrated in the middle of the credit score distribution, and mostly attributable to real estate investors" and that "credit growth between 2001 and 2007 was concentrated in the prime segment, and debt to high-risk [subprime] borrowers was virtually constant for all debt categories during this period." The authors argued that this investor-driven narrative was more accurate than blaming the crisis on lower-income, subprime borrowers. A 2011 Fed study had a similar finding: "In states that experienced the largest housing booms and busts, at the peak of the market almost half of purchase mortgage originations were associated with investors. In part by apparently misreporting their intentions to occupy the property, investors took on more leverage, contributing to higher rates of default." The Fed study reported that mortgage originations to investors rose from 25% in 2000 to 45% in 2006, for Arizona, California, Florida, and Nevada overall, where housing price increases during the bubble (and declines in the bust) were most pronounced. In these states, investor delinquency rose from around 15% in 2000 to over 35% in 2007 and 2008.

Economist Robert Shiller argued that speculative bubbles are fueled by "contagious optimism, seemingly impervious to facts, that often takes hold when prices are rising. Bubbles are primarily social phenomena; until we understand and address the psychology that fuels them, they're going to keep forming." Keynesian economist Hyman Minsky described how speculative borrowing contributed to rising debt and an eventual collapse of asset values.

Warren Buffett testified to the Financial Crisis Inquiry Commission: "There was the greatest bubble I've ever seen in my life...The entire American public eventually was caught up in a belief that housing prices could not fall dramatically."

==== High-risk mortgage loans and lending/borrowing practices ====
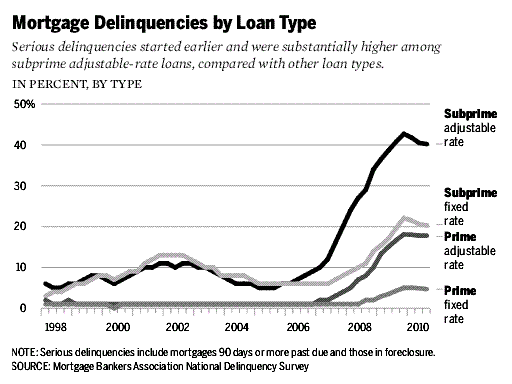
Historically less than 2% of homebuyers lost their homes to foreclosure. But by 2009 over 40% of subprime adjustable rate mortgages were past due.

In the years before the crisis, the behavior of lenders changed dramatically. Lenders offered more and more loans to higher-risk borrowers. Lending standards deteriorated particularly between 2004 and 2007, as the government-sponsored enterprise (GSE) mortgage market share (i.e. the share of Fannie Mae and Freddie Mac, which specialized in conventional, conforming, non-subprime mortgages) declined and private securitizers share grew, rising to more than half of mortgage securitizations.

Subprime mortgages grew from 5% of total originations ($35 billion) in 1994, to 20% ($600 billion) in 2006. Another indicator of a "classic" boom-bust credit cycle was a narrowing of the difference between subprime and prime mortgage interest rates (the "subprime markup") between 2001 and 2007.

In addition to considering higher-risk borrowers, lenders had offered progressively riskier loan options and borrowing incentives. In 2005, the median down payment for first-time home buyers was 2%, with 43% of those buyers making no down payment whatsoever. By comparison, China has down payment requirements that exceed 20%, with higher amounts for non-primary residences.

To produce more mortgages and more securities, mortgage qualification guidelines became progressively looser. First, "stated income, verified assets" (SIVA) loans replaced proof of income with a "statement" of it. Then, "no income, verified assets" (NIVA) loans eliminated proof of employment requirements. Borrowers needed only to show proof of money in their bank accounts. "No Income, No Assets" (NINA) or Ninja loans eliminated the need to prove, or even to state any owned assets. All that was required for a mortgage was a credit score.

Types of mortgages became more risky as well. The interest-only adjustable-rate mortgage (ARM) allowed the homeowner to pay only the interest (not principal) of the mortgage during an initial "teaser" period. Even looser was the "payment option" loan, in which the homeowner has the option to make monthly payments that do not even cover the interest for the first two- or three-year initial period of the loan. Nearly one in 10 mortgage borrowers in 2005 and 2006 took out these "option ARM" loans, and an estimated one-third of ARMs originated between 2004 and 2006 had "teaser" rates below 4%. After the initial period, monthly payments might double or even triple.

The proportion of subprime ARM loans made to people with credit scores high enough to qualify for conventional mortgages with better terms increased from 41% in 2000 to 61% by 2006. In addition, mortgage brokers in some cases received incentives from lenders to offer subprime ARMs even to those with credit ratings that merited a conforming (i.e., non-subprime) loan.

Mortgage underwriting standards declined precipitously during the boom period. The use of automated loan approvals allowed loans to be made without appropriate review and documentation. In 2007, 40% of all subprime loans resulted from automated underwriting. The chairman of the Mortgage Bankers Association claimed that mortgage brokers, while profiting from the home loan boom, did not do enough to examine whether borrowers could repay. Mortgage fraud by lenders and borrowers increased enormously.

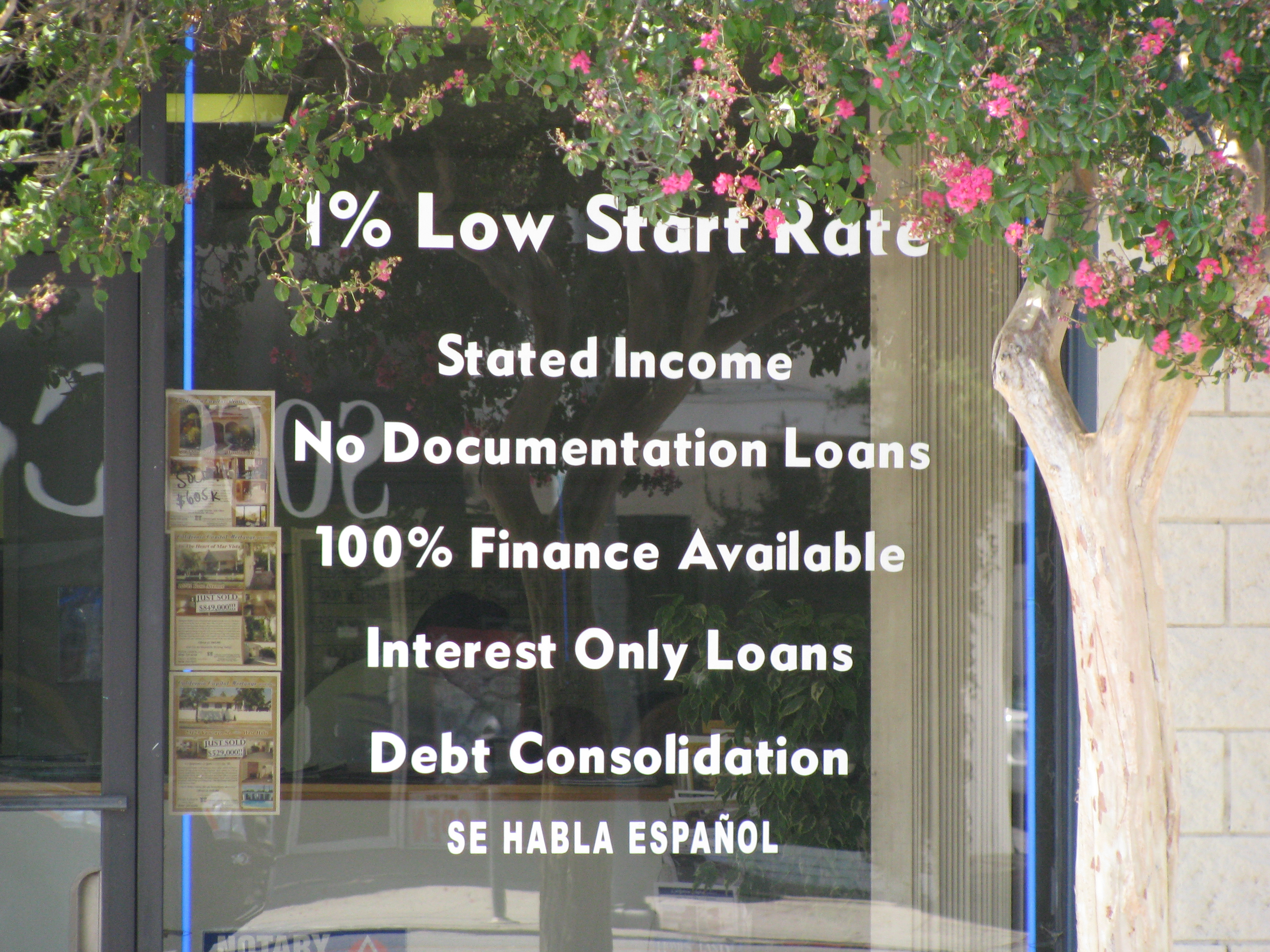
A mortgage brokerage in the US advertising subprime mortgages in July 2008

The Financial Crisis Inquiry Commission reported in January 2011 that many mortgage lenders took eager borrowers' qualifications on faith, often with a "willful disregard" for a borrower's ability to pay. Nearly 25% of all mortgages made in the first half of 2005 were "interest-only" loans. During the same year, 68% of "option ARM" loans originated by Countrywide Financial and Washington Mutual had low- or no-documentation requirements.

At least one study has suggested that the decline in standards was driven by a shift of mortgage securitization from a tightly controlled duopoly to a competitive market in which mortgage originators held the most sway. The worst mortgage vintage years coincided with the periods during which Government Sponsored Enterprises (specifically Fannie Mae and Freddie Mac) were at their weakest, and mortgage originators and private label securitizers were at their strongest.

In a Peabody Award-winning program, NPR correspondents considered why there was a market for low-quality private label securitizations. They argued that a "Giant Pool of Money" (represented by $70 trillion in worldwide fixed income investments) sought higher yields than those offered by U.S. Treasury bonds early in the decade. Further, this pool of money had roughly doubled in size from 2000 to 2007, yet the supply of relatively safe, income-generating investments had not grown as quickly. Investment banks on Wall Street answered this demand with financial innovation such as the mortgage-backed security (MBS) and collateralized debt obligation (CDO), which were assigned safe ratings by the credit rating agencies.

In effect, Wall Street connected this pool of money to the mortgage market in the U.S., with enormous fees accruing to those throughout the mortgage supply chain, from the mortgage broker selling the loans, to small banks that funded the brokers, to the giant investment banks behind them. By approximately 2003, the supply of mortgages originated at traditional lending standards had been exhausted. However, continued strong demand for MBS and CDO began to drive down lending standards, as long as mortgages could still be sold along the supply chain. Eventually, this speculative bubble proved unsustainable. NPR described it this way:

The problem was that even though housing prices were going through the roof, people weren't making any more money. From 2000 to 2007, the median household income stayed flat. And so the more prices rose, the more tenuous the whole thing became. No matter how lax lending standards got, no matter how many exotic mortgage products were created to shoehorn people into homes they couldn't possibly afford, no matter what the mortgage machine tried, the people just couldn't swing it. By late 2006, the average home cost nearly four times what the average family made. Historically it was between two and three times. And mortgage lenders noticed something that they'd almost never seen before. People would close on a house, sign all the mortgage papers, and then default on their very first payment. No loss of a job, no medical emergency, they were underwater before they even started. And although no one could really hear it, that was probably the moment when one of the biggest speculative bubbles in American history popped.

==== Subprime mortgage market ====
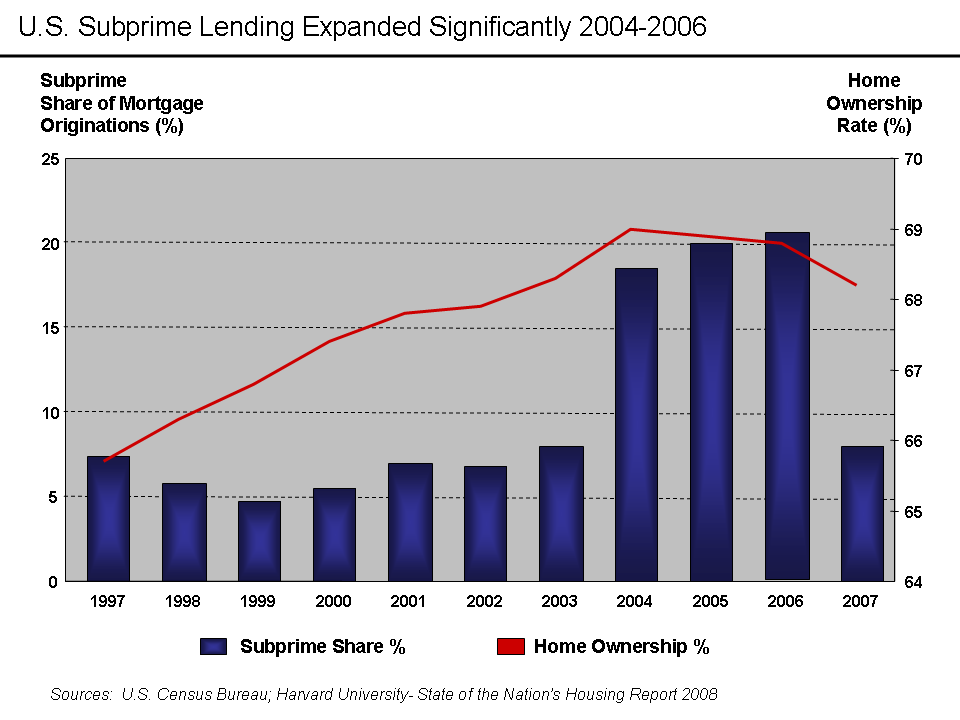
U.S. Subprime lending expanded dramatically 2004–2006.

Subprime borrowers typically have weakened credit histories and reduced repayment capacity. Subprime loans have a higher risk of default than loans to prime borrowers. If a borrower is delinquent in making timely mortgage payments to the loan servicer (a bank or other financial firm), the lender may take possession of the property, in a process called foreclosure.

The value of American subprime mortgages was estimated at $1.3 (~$1.94 trillion in 2025) trillion as of March 2007, with over 7.5 million first-lien subprime mortgages outstanding. Between 2004 and 2006 the share of subprime mortgages relative to total originations ranged from 18%–21%, versus less than 10% in 2001–2003 and during 2007. The majority of subprime loans were issued in California. The boom in mortgage lending, including subprime lending, was also driven by a fast expansion of non-bank independent mortgage originators which despite their smaller share (around 25% in 2002) in the market have contributed to around 50% of the increase in mortgage credit between 2003 and 2005. In the third quarter of 2007, subprime ARMs making up only 6.9% of US mortgages outstanding also accounted for 43% of the foreclosures which began during that quarter.

By October 2007, approximately 16% of subprime adjustable-rate mortgages (ARM) were either 90-days delinquent or the lender had begun foreclosure proceedings, roughly triple the rate of 2005. By January 2008, the delinquency rate had risen to 21% and by May 2008 it was 25%.

According to RealtyTrac, the value of all outstanding residential mortgages, owed by U.S. households to purchase residences housing at most four families, was US$9.9 trillion as of year-end 2006, and US$10.6 trillion as of midyear 2008. During 2007, lenders had begun foreclosure proceedings on nearly 1.3 million properties, a 79% increase over 2006. This increased to 2.3 million in 2008, an 81% increase vs. 2007, and again to 2.8 million in 2009, a 21% increase vs. 2008.

By August 2008, 9.2% of all U.S. mortgages outstanding were either delinquent or in foreclosure. By September 2009, this had risen to 14.4%.

Between August 2007 and October 2008, 936,439 US residences completed foreclosure. Foreclosures are concentrated in particular states both in terms of the number and rate of foreclosure filings. Ten states accounted for 74% of the foreclosure filings during 2008; the top two (California and Florida) represented 41%. Nine states were above the national foreclosure rate average of 1.84% of households.

==== Mortgage fraud and predatory lending ====
Growth in mortgage loan fraud based upon US Department of the Treasury Suspicious Activity Report Analysis

"The FBI defines mortgage fraud as 'the intentional misstatement, misrepresentation, or omission by an applicant or other interest parties, relied on by a lender or underwriter to provide funding for, to purchase, or to insure a mortgage loan.'" In 2004, the Federal Bureau of Investigation warned of an "epidemic" in mortgage fraud, an important credit risk of nonprime mortgage lending, which, they said, could lead to "a problem that could have as much impact as the S&L crisis". Despite this, the Bush administration prevented states from investigating and prosecuting predatory lenders by invoking a banking law from 1863 "to issue formal opinions preempting all state predatory lending laws, thereby rendering them inoperative."

The Financial Crisis Inquiry Commission reported in January 2011 that: "... mortgage fraud... flourished in an environment of collapsing lending standards and lax regulation. The number of suspicious activity reports – reports of possible financial crimes filed by depository banks and their affiliates – related to mortgage fraud grew 20-fold between 1996 and 2005 and then more than doubled again between 2005 and 2009. One study places the losses resulting from fraud on mortgage loans made between 2005 and 2007 at $112 billion."

The report continued that "Lenders made loans that they knew borrowers could not afford and that could cause massive losses to investors in mortgage securities." The unfair, deceptive, or fraudulent practices by lenders during the loan origination process was a form of predatory lending.

=== Financial markets ===
==== Boom and collapse of the shadow banking system ====
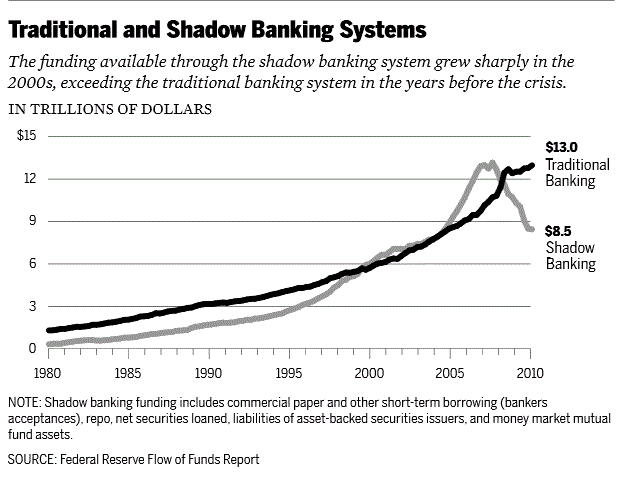
Comparison of the growth of traditional banking and shadow banking

The Financial Crisis Inquiry Commission reported in January 2011:

In the early part of the 20th century, we erected a series of protections – the Federal Reserve as a lender of last resort, federal deposit insurance, ample regulations – to provide a bulwark against the panics that had regularly plagued America's banking system in the 19th century. Yet, over the past 30-plus years, we permitted the growth of a shadow banking system – opaque and laden with short term debt – that rivaled the size of the traditional banking system. Key components of the market – for example, the multitrillion-dollar repo lending market, off-balance-sheet entities, and the use of over-the-counter derivatives – were hidden from view, without the protections we had constructed to prevent financial meltdowns. We had a 21st-century financial system with 19th-century safeguards.

In a June 2008 speech, President of the NY Federal Reserve Bank Timothy Geithner, who later became Secretary of the Treasury, placed significant blame for the freezing of credit markets on a "run" on the entities in the "parallel" banking system, also called the shadow banking system. These entities became critical to the credit markets underpinning the financial system, but were not subject to the same regulatory controls as depository banks. Further, these entities were vulnerable because they borrowed short-term in liquid markets to purchase long-term, illiquid and risky assets. This meant that disruptions in credit markets would make them subject to rapid deleveraging, selling their long-term assets at depressed prices.

Repo and other forms of shadow banking accounted for an estimated 60% of the "overall US banking system", according to Nobel laureate economist Paul Krugman. Geithner described its "entities":

In early 2007, asset-backed commercial paper conduits, in structured investment vehicles, in auction-rate preferred securities, tender option bonds and variable rate demand notes, had a combined asset size of roughly $2.2 (~$3.29 trillion in 2025) trillion. Assets financed overnight in triparty repo grew to $2.5 trillion. Assets held in hedge funds grew to roughly $1.8 trillion. The combined balance sheets of the then five major investment banks totaled $4 trillion. In comparison, the total assets of the top five bank holding companies in the United States at that point were just over $6 trillion, and total assets of the entire banking system were about $10 trillion.

He stated that the "combined effect of these factors was a financial system vulnerable to self-reinforcing asset price and credit cycles." Krugman described the run on the shadow banking system as the "core of what happened" to cause the crisis.

As the shadow banking system expanded to rival or even surpass conventional banking in importance, politicians and government officials should have realized that they were re-creating the kind of financial vulnerability that made the Great Depression possible – and they should have responded by extending regulations and the financial safety net to cover these new institutions. Influential figures should have proclaimed a simple rule: anything that does what a bank does, anything that has to be rescued in crises the way banks are, should be regulated like a bank.

He referred to this lack of controls as "malign neglect."

The securitization markets supported by the shadow banking system started to close down in the spring of 2007 and nearly shut-down in the fall of 2008. More than a third of the private credit markets thus became unavailable as a source of funds. According to the Brookings Institution, the traditional banking system does not have the capital to close this gap as of June 2009: "It would take a number of years of strong profits to generate sufficient capital to support that additional lending volume." The authors also indicate that some forms of securitization are "likely to vanish forever, having been an artifact of excessively loose credit conditions."

Economist Gary Gorton wrote in May 2009:

Unlike the historical banking panics of the 19th and early 20th centuries, the current banking panic is a wholesale panic, not a retail panic. In the earlier episodes, depositors ran to their banks and demanded cash in exchange for their checking accounts. Unable to meet those demands, the banking system became insolvent. The current panic involved financial firms "running" on other financial firms by not renewing sale and repurchase agreements (repo) or increasing the repo margin ("haircut"), forcing massive deleveraging, and resulting in the banking system being insolvent.

Fed Chair Ben Bernanke stated in an interview with the FCIC during 2009 that 12 of the 13 largest U.S. financial institutions were at risk of failure during 2008. The FCIC report did not identify which of the 13 firms was not considered by Bernanke to be in danger of failure.

Economist Mark Zandi testified to the Financial Crisis Inquiry Commission in January 2010:

The securitization markets also remain impaired, as investors anticipate more loan losses. Investors are also uncertain about coming legal and accounting rule changes and regulatory reforms. Private bond issuance of residential and commercial mortgage-backed securities, asset-backed securities, and CDOs peaked in 2006 at close to $2 trillion...In 2009, private issuance was less than $150 billion, and almost all of it was asset-backed issuance supported by the Federal Reserve's TALF program to aid credit card, auto and small-business lenders. Issuance of residential and commercial mortgage-backed securities and CDOs remains dormant.

The Economist reported in March 2010: "Bear Stearns and Lehman Brothers were non-banks that were crippled by a silent run among panicky overnight "repo" lenders, many of them money market funds uncertain about the quality of securitized collateral they were holding. Mass redemptions from these funds after Lehman's failure froze short-term funding for big firms."

==== Securitization ====
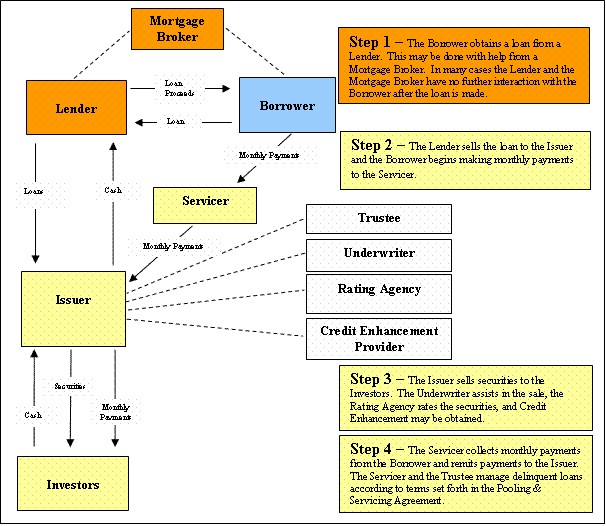
Borrowing under a securitization structure

Securitization – the bundling of bank loans to create tradeable bonds – started in the mortgage industry in the 1970s, when Government Sponsored Enterprises (GSEs) began to pool relatively safe, conventional, "conforming" or "prime" mortgages, create "mortgage-backed securities" (MBS) from the pool, sell them to investors, guaranteeing these securities/bonds against default on the underlying mortgages. This "originate-to-distribute" model had advantages over the old "originate-to-hold" model, where a bank originated a loan to the borrower/homeowner and retained the credit (default) risk. Securitization removed the loans from a bank's books, enabling the bank to remain in compliance with capital requirement laws. More loans could be made with proceeds of the MBS sale. The liquidity of a national and even international mortgage market allowed capital to flow where mortgages were in demand and funding short. However, securitization created a moral hazard – the bank/institution making the loan no longer had to worry if the mortgage was paid off – giving them incentive to process mortgage transactions but not to ensure their credit quality. Bankers were no longer around to work out borrower problems and minimize defaults during the course of the mortgage.

With the high down payments and credit scores of the conforming mortgages used by GSE, this danger was minimal. Investment banks however, wanted to enter the market and avoid competing with the GSEs. They did so by developing mortgage-backed securities in the riskier non-conforming subprime and Alt-A market. Unlike the GSEs the issuers generally did not guarantee the securities against default of the underlying mortgages.

What these "private label" or "non-agency" originators did do was to use "structured finance" to create securities. Structuring involved "slicing" the pooled mortgages into "tranches", each having a different priority in the monthly or quarterly principal and interest stream. Tranches were compared to "buckets" catching the "water" of principal and interest. More senior buckets did not share water with those below until they were filled to the brim and overflowing. This gave the top buckets/tranches considerable creditworthiness (in theory) that would earn the highest "triple A" credit ratings, making them sellable to money market and pension funds that would not otherwise deal with subprime mortgage securities.

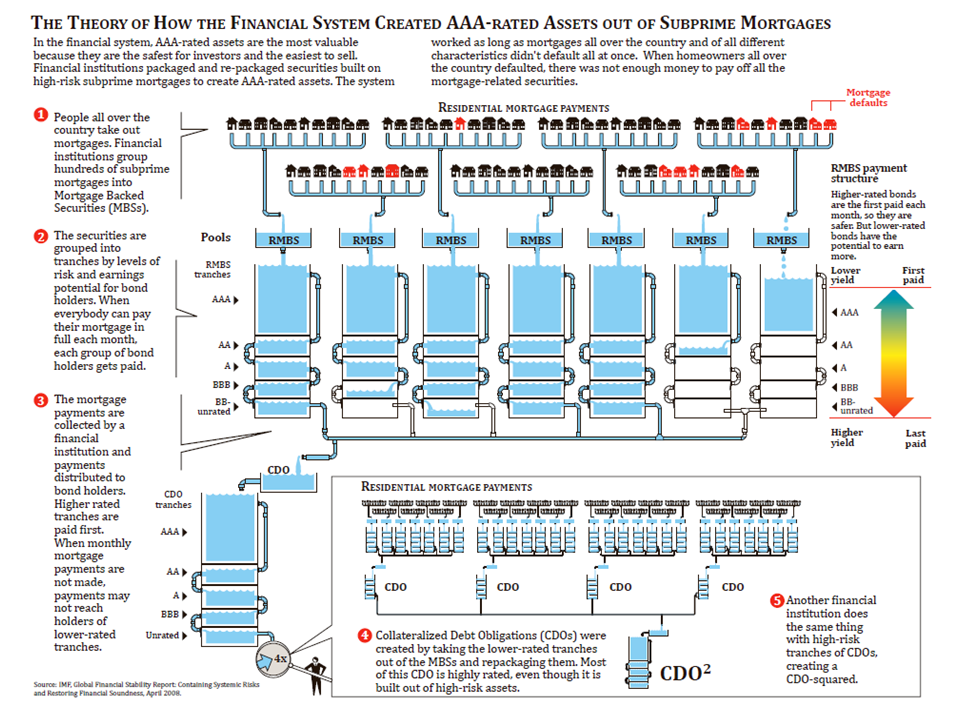
IMF diagram of CDO and RMBS

To use up the MBS tranches lower in payback priority that could not be rated triple-A and that a conservative fixed income market would not buy, investment banks developed another security – known as the collateralized debt obligation (CDO). Although the CDO market was smaller, it was crucial because unless buyers were found for the non-triple-A or "mezzanine" tranches, it would not be profitable to make a mortgage-backed security in the first place. These CDOs pooled the leftover BBB, A−, etc. rated tranches, and produced new tranches – 70% to 80% of which were rated triple A by rating agencies. The 20–30% remaining mezzanine tranches were sometimes bought up by other CDOs, to make so-called "CDO-Squared" securities which also produced tranches rated mostly triple A.

This process was later disparaged as "ratings laundering" or a way of transforming "dross into gold" by some business journalists, but was justified at the time by the belief that home prices would always rise. The model used by underwriters, rating agencies and investors to estimate the probability of mortgage default was based on the history of credit default swaps, which unfortunately went back "less than a decade, a period when house prices soared".

In addition the model – which postulated that the correlation of default risks among loans in securitization pools could be measured in a simple, stable, tractable number, suitable for risk management or valuation – also purported to show that the mortgages in CDO pools were well diversified or "uncorrelated". Defaults on mortgages in Orlando, for example, were thought to have no effect on – i.e. were uncorrelated with – the real estate market across the country in Laguna Beach. When prices corrected (i.e. the bubble collapsed), the resulting defaults were not only larger in number than predicted but far more correlated.

Still another innovative security criticized after the bubble burst was the synthetic CDO. Cheaper and easier to create than original "cash" CDOs, synthetics did not provide funding for housing, rather synthetic CDO-buying investors were in effect providing insurance (in the form of "credit default swaps") against mortgage default. The mortgages they insured were those in "cash" CDOs the synthetics "referenced". So instead of providing investors with interest and principal payments from MBS tranches, payments were the equivalent of insurance premiums from the insurance "buyers". If the referenced CDOs defaulted, investors lost their investment, which was paid out to the insurance buyers.

Unlike true insurance, credit default swaps were not regulated to insure that providers had the reserves to pay settlements, or that buyers owned the property (MBSs) they were insuring, i.e. were not simply making a bet a security would default. Because synthetics "referenced" another (cash) CDO, more than one – in fact numerous – synthetics could be made to reference the same original, multiplying the effect if a referenced security defaulted. As with MBS and other CDOs, triple A ratings for "large chunks" of synthetics were crucial to the securities' success, because of the buyer/investors' ignorance of the mortgage security market and trust in the credit rating agencies ratings.

Securitization began to take off in the mid-1990s. The total amount of mortgage-backed securities issued almost tripled between 1996 and 2007, to $7.3 trillion. The securitized share of subprime mortgages (i.e., those passed to third-party investors via MBS) increased from 54% in 2001, to 75% in 2006. In the mid-2000s as the housing market was peaking, GSE securitization market share declined dramatically, while higher-risk subprime and Alt-A mortgage private label securitization grew sharply. As mortgage defaults began to rise, it was among mortgages securitized by the private banks. GSE mortgages – securitized or not – continued to perform better than the rest of the market. Picking up the slack for the dwindling cash CDO market synthetics were the dominant form of CDO's by 2006, valued "notionally" at an estimated $5 trillion.

By the autumn of 2008, when the securitization market "seized up" and investors would "no longer lend at any price", securitized lending made up about $10 trillion of the roughly $25 trillion American credit market, (i.e. what "American homeowners, consumers, and corporations owed"). In February 2009, Ben Bernanke stated that securitization markets remained effectively shut, with the exception of conforming mortgages, which could be sold to Fannie Mae and Freddie Mac.

According to economist A. Michael Spence: "when formerly uncorrelated risks shift and become highly correlated ... diversification models fail." "An important challenge going forward is to better understand these dynamics as the analytical underpinning of an early warning system with respect to financial instability."

Criticizing the argument that complex structured investment securitization was instrumental in the mortgage crisis, Paul Krugman points out that the Wall Street firms issuing the securities "kept the riskiest assets on their own books", and that neither of the equally disastrous bubbles in European housing or US commercial property used complex structured securities. Krugman does agree that it is "arguable is that financial innovation ... spread the bust to financial institutions around the world" and its inherent fragmentation of loans has made post-bubble "cleanup" through debt renegotiation extremely difficult.

==== Financial institution debt levels and incentives ====
Leverage ratios of investment banks increased significantly between 2003 and 2007.

The Financial Crisis Inquiry Commission reported in January 2011 that: "From 1978 to 2007, the amount of debt held by the financial sector soared from $3 trillion to $36 trillion, more than doubling as a share of gross domestic product. The very nature of many Wall Street firms changed – from relatively staid private partnerships to publicly traded corporations taking greater and more diverse kinds of risks. By 2005, the 10 largest U.S. commercial banks held 55% of the industry's assets, more than double the level held in 1990. On the eve of the crisis in 2006, financial sector profits constituted 27% of all corporate profits in the United States, up from 15% in 1980."

Many financial institutions, investment banks in particular, issued large amounts of debt during 2004–07, and invested the proceeds in mortgage-backed securities (MBS), essentially betting that house prices would continue to rise, and that households would continue to make their mortgage payments. Borrowing at a lower interest rate and investing the proceeds at a higher interest rate is a form of financial leverage. This is analogous to an individual taking out a second mortgage on his residence to invest in the stock market. This strategy proved profitable during the housing boom, but resulted in large losses when house prices began to decline and mortgages began to default. Beginning in 2007, financial institutions and individual investors holding MBS also suffered significant losses from mortgage payment defaults and the resulting decline in the value of MBS.

A 2004 U.S. Securities and Exchange Commission (SEC) decision related to the net capital rule allowed US investment banks to issue substantially more debt, which was then used to purchase MBS. Over 2004–07, the top five US investment banks each significantly increased their financial leverage (see diagram), which increased their vulnerability to the declining value of MBSs. These five institutions reported over $4.1 trillion in debt for fiscal year 2007, about 30% of US nominal GDP for 2007. Further, the percentage of subprime mortgages originated to total originations increased from below 10% in 2001–03 to between 18–20% from 2004 to 2006, due in-part to financing from investment banks.

During 2008, three of the largest U.S. investment banks either went bankrupt (Lehman Brothers) or were sold at fire sale prices to other banks (Bear Stearns and Merrill). These failures augmented the instability in the global financial system. The remaining two investment banks, Morgan Stanley and Goldman Sachs, opted to become commercial banks, thereby subjecting themselves to more stringent regulation.

In the years leading up to the crisis, the top four U.S. depository banks moved an estimated $5.2 trillion in assets and liabilities off-balance sheet into special purpose vehicles or other entities in the shadow banking system. This enabled them to essentially bypass existing regulations regarding minimum capital ratios, thereby increasing leverage and profits during the boom but increasing losses during the crisis. New accounting guidance will require them to put some of these assets back onto their books during 2009, which will significantly reduce their capital ratios. One news agency estimated this amount to be between $500 billion and $1 trillion. This effect was considered as part of the stress tests performed by the government during 2009.

Martin Wolf wrote in June 2009: "...an enormous part of what banks did in the early part of this decade – the off-balance-sheet vehicles, the derivatives and the 'shadow banking system' itself – was to find a way round regulation."

The New York State Comptroller's Office has said that in 2006, Wall Street executives took home bonuses totaling $23.9 billion (~$36.7 billion in 2025). "Wall Street traders were thinking of the bonus at the end of the year, not the long-term health of their firm. The whole system – from mortgage brokers to Wall Street risk managers – seemed tilted toward taking short-term risks while ignoring long-term obligations. The most damning evidence is that most of the people at the top of the banks didn't really understand how those [investments] worked."

The incentive compensation of traders was focused on fees generated from assembling financial products, rather than the performance of those products and profits generated over time. Their bonuses were heavily skewed towards cash rather than stock and not subject to "claw-back" (recovery of the bonus from the employee by the firm) in the event the MBS or CDO created did not perform. In addition, the increased risk (in the form of financial leverage) taken by the major investment banks was not adequately factored into the compensation of senior executives.

==== Credit default swaps ====
Credit default swaps (CDS) are financial instruments used as a hedge and protection for debtholders, in particular MBS investors, from the risk of default, or by speculators to profit from default. As the net worth of banks and other financial institutions deteriorated because of losses related to subprime mortgages, the likelihood increased that those providing the protection would have to pay their counterparties. This created uncertainty across the system, as investors wondered which companies would be required to pay to cover mortgage defaults.

Like all swaps and other financial derivatives, CDS may either be used to hedge risks (specifically, to insure creditors against default) or to profit from speculation. The volume of CDS outstanding increased 100-fold from 1998 to 2008, with estimates of the debt covered by CDS contracts, as of November 2008, ranging from US$33 to $47 trillion. CDS are lightly regulated, largely because of the Commodity Futures Modernization Act of 2000. As of 2008, there was no central clearing house to honor CDS in the event a party to a CDS proved unable to perform his obligations under the CDS contract. Required disclosure of CDS-related obligations has been criticized as inadequate. Insurance companies such as American International Group (AIG), MBIA, and Ambac faced ratings downgrades because widespread mortgage defaults increased their potential exposure to CDS losses. These firms had to obtain additional funds (capital) to offset this exposure. AIG's having CDSs insuring $440 billion of MBS resulted in its seeking and obtaining a Federal government bailout. The monoline insurance companies went out of business in 2008–2009.

When investment bank Lehman Brothers went bankrupt in September 2008, there was much uncertainty as to which financial firms would be required to honor the CDS contracts on its $600 billion (~$880 billion in 2025) of bonds outstanding.

Merrill's large losses in 2008 were attributed in part to the drop in value of its unhedged portfolio of collateralized debt obligations (CDOs) after AIG ceased offering CDS on Merrill's CDOs. The loss of confidence of trading partners in Merrill's solvency and its ability to refinance its short-term debt led to its acquisition by the Bank of America.

Economist Joseph Stiglitz summarized how credit default swaps contributed to the systemic meltdown: "With this complicated intertwining of bets of great magnitude, no one could be sure of the financial position of anyone else-or even of one's own position. Not surprisingly, the credit markets froze."

Author Michael Lewis wrote that CDS enabled speculators to stack bets on the same mortgage bonds and CDO's. This is analogous to allowing many persons to buy insurance on the same house. Speculators that bought CDS insurance were betting that significant defaults would occur, while the sellers (such as AIG) bet they would not. A theoretically infinite amount could be wagered on the same housing-related securities, provided buyers and sellers of the CDS could be found.

Derivatives such as CDS were unregulated or barely regulated. Several sources have noted the failure of the US government to supervise or even require transparency of the financial instruments known as derivatives. A 2008 investigative article in The Washington Post found that leading government officials at the time (Federal Reserve Board Chairman Alan Greenspan, Treasury Secretary Robert Rubin, and SEC Chairman Arthur Levitt) vehemently opposed any regulation of derivatives. In 1998 Brooksley E. Born, head of the Commodity Futures Trading Commission, put forth a policy paper asking for feedback from regulators, lobbyists, legislators on the question of whether derivatives should be reported, sold through a central facility, or whether capital requirements should be required of their buyers. Greenspan, Rubin, and Levitt pressured her to withdraw the paper and Greenspan persuaded Congress to pass a resolution preventing CFTC from regulating derivatives for another six months – when Born's term of office would expire. Ultimately, it was the collapse of a specific kind of derivative, the mortgage-backed security, that triggered the economic crisis of 2008.

In addition, Chicago Public Radio, Huffington Post, and ProPublica reported in April 2010 that market participants, including a hedge fund called Magnetar Capital, encouraged the creation of CDO's containing low quality mortgages, so they could bet against them using CDS. NPR reported that Magnetar encouraged investors to purchase CDO's while simultaneously betting against them, without disclosing the latter bet. Instruments called synthetic CDO, which are portfolios of credit default swaps, were also involved in allegations by the SEC against Goldman-Sachs in April 2010.

The Financial Crisis Inquiry Commission reported in January 2011 that CDS contributed significantly to the crisis. Companies were able to sell protection to investors against the default of mortgage-backed securities, helping to launch and expand the market for new, complex instruments such as CDO's. This further fueled the housing bubble. They also amplified the losses from the collapse of the housing bubble by allowing multiple bets on the same securities and helped spread these bets throughout the financial system. Companies selling protection, such as AIG, were not required to set aside sufficient capital to cover their obligations when significant defaults occurred. Because many CDS were not traded on exchanges, the obligations of key financial institutions became hard to measure, creating uncertainty in the financial system.

==== Inaccurate credit ratings ====
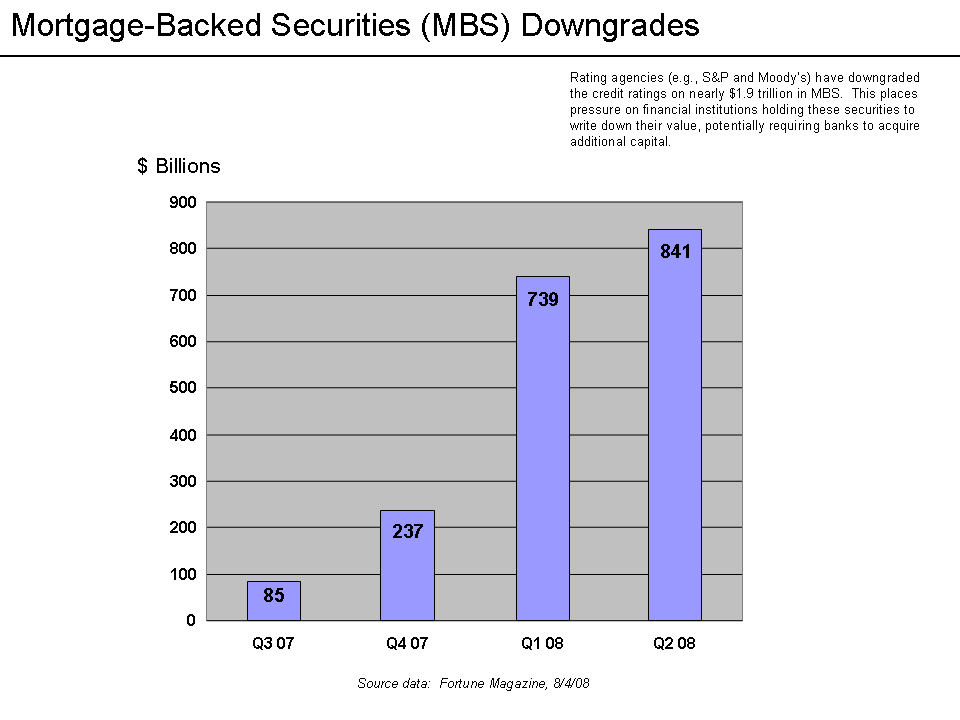
MBS credit rating downgrades, by quarter

Credit rating agencies – firms which rate debt instruments/securities according to the debtor's ability to pay lenders back – have come under scrutiny during and after the financial crisis for having given investment-grade ratings to MBSs and CDOs based on risky subprime mortgage loans that later defaulted. Dozens of lawsuits have been filed by investors against the "Big Three" rating agencies – Moody's Investors Service, Standard & Poor's and Fitch Ratings. The Financial Crisis Inquiry Commission (FCIC) concluded the "failures" of the Big Three rating agencies were "essential cogs in the wheel of financial destruction" and "key enablers of the financial meltdown". Economist Joseph Stiglitz called them "one of the key culprits" of the financial crisis. Others called their ratings "catastrophically misleading", (the U.S. Securities and Exchange Commissioner), their performance "horrendous" (The Economist magazine). There are indications that some involved in rating subprime-related securities knew at the time that the rating process was faulty.

The position of the three agencies "between the issuers and the investors of securities" "transformed" them into "key" players in the housing bubble and financial crisis according to the Financial Crisis Inquiry Report. Most investors in the fixed income market had no experience with the mortgage business – let alone dealing with the complexity of pools of mortgages and tranche priority of MBS and CDO securities – and were simply looking for an independent party who could rate securities. The putatively independent parties meanwhile were paid "handsome fees" by investment banks "to obtain the desired ratings", according to one expert.

In addition, a large section of the debt securities market – many money markets and pension funds – were restricted in their bylaws to holding only the safest securities – i.e securities the rating agencies designated "triple-A". Hence non-prime securities could not be sold without ratings by (usually two of) the three agencies.

From 2000 to 2007, one of the largest agencies – Moody's – rated nearly 45,000 mortgage-related securities – more than half of those it rated – as triple-A. By December 2008, there were over $11 (~$16.00 in 2025) trillion structured finance securities outstanding in the U.S. bond market debt. But as the boom matured, mortgage underwriting standards deteriorated. By 2007 an estimated $3.2 (~$4.78 trillion in 2025) trillion in loans were made to homebuyers and owners with bad credit and undocumented incomes, bundled into MBSs and CDOs, and given top ratings to appeal to global investors.

As these mortgages began to default, the three agencies were compelled to go back and redo their ratings. Between autumn of 2007 and the middle of 2008, agencies downgraded nearly $2 trillion in MBS tranches. By the end of 2008, 80% of the CDOs by value rated "triple-A" were downgraded to junk. Bank writedowns and losses on these investments totaled $523 billion.

Critics such as the FCIC argue the mistaken credit ratings stemmed from "flawed computer models, the pressure from financial firms that paid for the ratings, the relentless drive for market share, the lack of resources to do the job despite record profits, and the absence of meaningful public oversight".

Structured investment was very profitable to the agencies and by 2007 accounted for just under half of Moody's total ratings revenue and all of the revenue growth. But profits were not guaranteed, and issuers played the agencies off one another, 'shopping' around to find the best ratings, sometimes openly threatening to cut off business after insufficiently generous ratings. Thus there was a conflict of interest between accommodating clients – for whom higher ratings meant higher earnings – and accurately rating the debt for the benefit of the debt buyer/investors – who provided zero revenue to the agencies.

Despite the profitability of the three big credit agencies – Moody's operating margins were consistently over 50%, higher than famously successful ExxonMobil or Microsoft – salaries and bonuses for non-management were significantly lower than at Wall Street banks, and its employees complained of overwork.

This incentivized agency rating analysts to seek employment at those Wall Street banks who were issuing mortgage securities, and who were particularly interested in the analysts' knowledge of what criteria their former employers used to rate securities. Inside knowledge of interest to security issuers eager to find loopholes included the fact that rating agencies looked at the average credit score of a pool of borrowers, but not how dispersed it was; that agencies ignored borrower's household income or length of credit history (explaining the large numbers of low income immigrants given mortgages—people "who had never failed to repay a debt, because they had never been given a loan"); that agencies were indifferent to credit worthiness issues of adjustable-rate mortgages with low teaser rates, "silent second" mortgages, or no-documentation mortgages.

As of 2010, virtually all of the investigations of rating agencies, criminal as well as civil, are in their early stages. In New York, state prosecutors are examining whether eight banks duped the credit ratings agencies into inflating the grades of subprime-linked investments. In the dozens of suits filed against them by investors involving claims of inaccurate ratings the rating agencies have defended themselves using the First Amendment defense—that a credit rating is an opinion protected as free speech. In 2013, McClatchy Newspapers found that "little competition has emerged" since the Credit Rating Agency Reform Act of 2006 was passed "in rating the kinds of complex home-mortgage securities whose implosion led to the 2007 financial crisis". The Big Three's market share of outstanding credit rating has barely shrunk, moving from 98% to 97%.

=== Governmental policies ===
Government over-regulation, failed regulation and deregulation have all been claimed as causes of the crisis. Increasing home ownership has been the goal of several presidents including Roosevelt, Reagan, Clinton and George W. Bush.

==== Decreased regulation of financial institutions ====
Those of us who have looked to the self-interest of lending institutions to protect shareholders' equity, myself included, are in a state of shocked disbelief.

— Alan Greenspan

Several steps were taken to deregulate banking institutions in the years leading up to the crisis. Further, major investment banks which collapsed during the crisis were not subject to the regulations applied to depository banks. In testimony before Congress both the Securities and Exchange Commission (SEC) and Alan Greenspan claimed failure in allowing the self-regulation of investment banks.

In 1982, Congress passed the Alternative Mortgage Transactions Parity Act (AMTPA), which allowed non-federally chartered housing creditors to write adjustable-rate mortgages. This bi-partisan legislation was, according to the Urban Institute, intended to "increase the volume of loan products that reduced the up-front costs to borrowers in order to make homeownership more affordable." Among the new mortgage loan types created and gaining in popularity in the early 1980s were adjustable-rate, option adjustable-rate, balloon-payment and interest-only mortgages. Subsequent widespread abuses of predatory lending occurred with the use of adjustable-rate mortgages. Approximately 90% of subprime mortgages issued in 2006 were adjustable-rate mortgages.

The Glass–Steagall Act was enacted after the Great Depression. It separated commercial banks and investment banks, in part to avoid potential conflicts of interest between the lending activities of the former and rating activities of the latter. In 1999 Glass–Steagall was repealed by the Gramm-Leach-Bliley Act. Economist Joseph Stiglitz criticized the repeal of Glass–Steagall because, in his opinion, it enabled the risk-taking culture of investment banking to dominate the more conservative commercial banking culture, leading to increased levels of risk-taking and leverage during the boom period. President Bill Clinton, who signed the legislation, dismissed its connection to the subprime mortgage crisis, stating (in 2008): "I don't see that signing that bill had anything to do with the current crisis."

The Commodity Futures Modernization Act of 2000 was bi-partisan legislation that formally exempted derivatives from regulation, supervision, trading on established exchanges, and capital reserve requirements for major participants. It "provided a legal safe harbor for treatment already in effect." Concerns that counterparties to derivative deals would be unable to pay their obligations caused pervasive uncertainty during the crisis. Particularly relevant to the crisis are credit default swaps (CDS), a derivative in which Party A pays Party B what is essentially an insurance premium, in exchange for payment should Party C default on its obligations. Warren Buffett famously referred to derivatives as "financial weapons of mass destruction" in early 2003.

Former Fed Chair Alan Greenspan, who many economists blamed for the financial crisis, testified in October 2008 that he had trusted free markets to self-correct and had not anticipated the risk of reduced lending standards."Those of us who have looked to the self-interest of lending institutions to protect shareholders' equity, myself included, are in a state of shocked disbelief."

Some analysts believe the subprime mortgage crisis was due, in part, to a 2004 decision of the SEC that affected 5 large investment banks. The critics believe that changes in the capital reserve calculation rules enabled investment banks to substantially increase the level of debt they were taking on, fueling the growth in mortgage-backed securities supporting subprime mortgages. These banks dramatically increased their risk taking from 2003 to 2007. By the end of 2007, the largest five U.S. investment banks had over $4 (~$5.97 trillion in 2025) trillion in debt with high ratios of debt to equity, meaning only a small decline in the value of their assets would render them insolvent. However, in an April 9, 2009, speech, Erik Sirri, then director of the SEC's Division of Trading and Markets, argued that the regulatory weaknesses in leverage restrictions originated in the late 1970s: "The Commission did not undo any leverage restrictions in 2004," nor did it intend to make a substantial reduction.

The financial sector invested heavily to gain clout in the halls of government to bring about these major deregulatory objectives: it spent more than $5 billion over a decade to strengthen its political clout in Washington, DC, including $1.725 billion in political campaign contributions and $3.4 billion on Industry lobbyists during the years 1998–2008.

==== Policies to promote private ownership of housing ====
"Members of the Right tried to blame the seeming market failures on government; in their mind the government effort to push people with low incomes into home ownership was the source of the problem. Widespread as this belief has become in conservative circles, virtually all serious attempts to evaluate the evidence have concluded that there is little merit in this view."

— Joseph Stiglitz

Several administrations, both Democratic and Republican, advocated private home ownership in the years leading up to the crisis. The Housing and Community Development Act of 1992 established, for the first time, a mandate to Fannie Mae and Freddie Mac for loans to enable home ownership of less expensive housing, a mandate to be regulated by the Department of Housing and Urban Development (HUD). Initially, the 1992 legislation required that 30% or more of Fannie's and Freddie's loan purchases be in support of private home ownership of affordable housing. However, HUD was given the power to set future requirements. During the later part of the Clinton administration, HUD Secretary Andrew Cuomo announced "new regulations to provide $2.4 trillion in mortgages for affordable housing for 28.1 million families, which increased the required percentage of mortgage loans for low- and moderate-income families that finance companies Fannie Mae and Freddie Mac must buy annually from the then current 42% of their total purchases to a new high of 50%. Eventually (under the Bush administration) a 56% minimum was established. Additionally, in 2003, "The Bush administration today recommended the most significant regulatory overhaul in the housing finance industry since the savings and loan crisis a decade ago."

"The National Homeownership Strategy: Partners in the American Dream", was compiled in 1995 by Henry Cisneros, President Clinton's HUD Secretary. This 100-page document represented the viewpoints of HUD, Fannie Mae, Freddie Mac, leaders of the housing industry, various banks, numerous activist organizations such as ACORN and La Raza, and representatives from several state and local governments." In 2001, the independent research company, Graham Fisher & Company, stated: "While the underlying initiatives of the [strategy] were broad in content, the main theme … was the relaxation of credit standards."

The Financial Crisis Inquiry Commission (majority report), Federal Reserve economists, and several academic researchers have stated that government affordable housing policies were not the major cause of the financial crisis. They also state that Community Reinvestment Act loans outperformed other "subprime" mortgages, and GSE mortgages performed better than private label securitizations.

===== Community Reinvestment Act =====
The Community Reinvestment Act (CRA) was originally enacted under President Jimmy Carter in 1977 in an effort to encourage banks to halt the practice of lending discrimination. In 1995 the Clinton administration issued regulations that added numerical guidelines, urged lending flexibility, and instructed bank examiners to evaluate a bank's responsiveness to community activists (such as ACORN) when deciding whether to approve bank merger or expansion requests. Critics claim that the 1995 changes to CRA signaled to banks that relaxed lending standards were appropriate and could minimize potential risk of governmental sanctions.

In its "Conclusions" submitted January 2011, the Financial Crisis Inquiry Commission reported that

"the CRA was not a significant factor in subprime lending or the crisis. Many subprime lenders were not subject to the CRA. Research indicates only 6% of high-cost loans—a proxy for subprime loans—had any connection to the law. Loans made by CRA-regulated lenders in the neighborhoods in which they were required to lend were half as likely to default as similar loans made in the same neighborhoods by independent mortgage originators not subject to the law."

Critics claim that the use of the high-interest-rate proxy distorts results because government programs generally promote low-interest rate loans—even when the loans are to borrowers who are clearly subprime. However, several economists maintain that Community Reinvestment Act loans outperformed other "subprime" mortgages, and GSE mortgages performed better than private label securitizations.

However, economists at the National Bureau of Economic Research (NBER) concluded that banks undergoing CRA-related regulatory exams took additional mortgage lending risk. The authors of a study entitled "Did the Community Reinvestment Act Lead to Risky Lending?" found that "in the six quarters surrounding a CRA exam, lending by banks undergoing a CRA exam is 5 percent higher on average". They concluded: "The evidence shows that around CRA examinations, when incentives to conform to CRA standards are particularly high, banks not only increase lending rates but also appear to originate loans that are markedly riskier." Loan delinquency averaged 15% higher in the treatment group than the control group one year after mortgage origination.

==== State and local governmental programs ====
As part of the 1995 National Homeownership Strategy, HUD advocated greater involvement of state and local organizations in the promotion of affordable housing. In addition, it promoted the use of low or no-down payment loans and second, unsecured loans to the borrower to pay their down payments (if any) and closing costs. This idea manifested itself in "silent second" loans that became extremely popular in several states such as California, and in scores of cities such as San Francisco. Using federal funds and their own funds, these states and cities offered borrowers loans that would defray the cost of the down payment. The loans were called "silent" because the primary lender was not supposed to know about them. A Neighborhood Reinvestment Corporation (affiliated with HUD) publicity sheet explicitly described the desired secrecy: "[The NRC affiliates] hold the second mortgages. Instead of going to the family, the monthly voucher is paid to [the NRC affiliates]. In this way the voucher is "invisible" to the traditional lender and the family (emphasis added)

=== Role of Fannie Mae and Freddie Mac ===
Fannie Mae and Freddie Mac are government-sponsored enterprises (GSE) that purchase mortgages, buy and sell mortgage-backed securities (MBS), and guarantee nearly half of the mortgages in the U.S. A variety of political and competitive pressures resulted in the GSEs ramping up their purchase and guarantee of risky mortgages in 2005 and 2006, just as the housing market was peaking. Fannie and Freddie were both under political pressure to expand purchases of higher-risk affordable housing mortgage types, and under significant competitive pressure from large investment banks and mortgage lenders.

As early as February 2004, in testimony before the U.S. Senate Banking Committee, Alan Greenspan (chairman of the Federal Reserve) raised serious concerns regarding the systemic financial risk that Fannie Mae and Freddie Mac represented. He implored Congress to take actions to avert a crisis. The GSEs dispute these studies and dismissed Greenspan's testimony.

Nine of the ten members of the Financial Crisis Inquiry Commission reported in 2011 that Fannie and Freddie "contributed to the crisis, but were not a primary cause", or that since "credit spreads declined not just for housing, but also for other asset classes like commercial real estate ... problems with U.S. housing policy or markets [could] not by themselves explain the U.S. housing bubble." According to the Commission, GSE mortgage securities essentially maintained their value throughout the crisis and did not contribute to the significant financial firm losses that were central to the financial crisis. The GSEs participated in the expansion of subprime and other risky mortgages, but they followed rather than led Wall Street and other lenders into subprime lending.

Several studies by the Government Accountability Office (GAO), Harvard Joint Center for Housing Studies, the Federal Housing Finance Agency, and several academic institutions summarized by economist Mike Konczal of the Roosevelt Institute, indicate Fannie and Freddie were not to blame for the crisis. A 2011 statistical comparisons of regions of the US which were subject to GSE regulations with regions that were not, done by the Federal Reserve, found that GSEs played no significant role in the subprime crisis. In 2008, David Goldstein and Kevin G. Hall reported that more than 84% of the subprime mortgages came from private lending institutions in 2006, and the share of subprime loans insured by Fannie Mae and Freddie Mac decreased as the bubble got bigger (from a high of insuring 48% to insuring 24% of all subprime loans in 2006). In 2008, another source found estimates by some analysts that Fannie's share of the subprime mortgage-backed securities market dropped from a peak of 44% in 2003 to 22% in 2005, before rising to 33% in 2007.

Whether GSEs played a small role in the crisis because they were legally barred from engaging in subprime lending is disputed. Economist Russell Roberts cites a June 2008 Washington Post article which stated that "[f]rom 2004 to 2006, the two [GSEs] purchased $434 billion in securities backed by subprime loans, creating a market for more such lending." Furthermore, a 2004 HUD report admitted that while trading securities that were backed by subprime mortgages was something that the GSEs officially disavowed, they nevertheless participated in the market.

Insofar as Fannie and Freddie did purchase substandard loans, some analysts question whether government mandates for affordable housing were the motivation. In December 2011 the Securities and Exchange Commission charged the former Fannie Mae and Freddie Mac executives, accusing them of misleading investors about risks of subprime-mortgage loans and about the amount of subprime mortgage loans they held in portfolio. According to financial analyst Karen Petrou, "The SEC's facts paint a picture in which it wasn't high-minded government mandates that did the GSEs wrong, but rather the monomaniacal focus of top management on marketshare. With marketshare came bonuses and with bonuses came risk-taking, understood or not." However, there is evidence suggesting that governmental housing policies were a motivational factor. Daniel H. Mudd, the former CEO of Fannie Mae, stated: "We were afraid that lenders would be selling products we weren't buying and Congress would feel like we weren't fulfilling our mission." Another senior Fannie Mae executive stated: "Everybody understood that we were now buying loans that we would have previously rejected, and that the models were telling us that we were charging way too little, but our mandate was to stay relevant and to serve low-income borrowers. So that's what we did."

In his lone dissent to the majority and minority opinions of the FCIC, Peter J. Wallison of the American Enterprise Institute (AEI) blamed U.S. housing policy, including the actions of Fannie and Freddie, primarily for the crisis, writing: "When the bubble began to deflate in mid-2007, the low quality and high risk loans engendered by government policies failed in unprecedented numbers. The effect of these defaults was exacerbated by the fact that few if any investors – including housing market analysts – understood at the time that Fannie Mae and Freddie Mac had been acquiring large numbers of subprime and other high risk loans in order to meet HUD's affordable housing goals." His dissent relied heavily on the research of fellow AEI member Edward Pinto, the former Chief Credit Officer of Fannie Mae. Pinto estimated that by early 2008 there were 27 million higher-risk, "non-traditional" mortgages (defined as subprime and Alt-A) outstanding valued at $4.6 (~$6.74 trillion in 2025) trillion. Of these, Fannie & Freddie held or guaranteed 12 million mortgages valued at $1.8 trillion. Government entities held or guaranteed 19.2 million or $2.7 trillion of such mortgages total.

One counter-argument to Wallison and Pinto's analysis is that the credit bubble was global and also affected the U.S. commercial real estate market, a scope beyond U.S. government housing policy pressures. The three Republican authors of the dissenting report to the FCIC majority opinion wrote in January 2011: "Credit spreads declined not just for housing, but also for other asset classes like commercial real estate. This tells us to look to the credit bubble as an essential cause of the U.S. housing bubble. It also tells us that problems with U.S. housing policy or markets do not by themselves explain the U.S. housing bubble." Economist Paul Krugman wrote in January 2010 that Fannie Mae, Freddie Mac, CRA, or predatory lending were not primary causes of the bubble/bust in residential real estate because there was a bubble of similar magnitude in commercial real estate in America.

Countering the analysis of Krugman and members of the FCIC, Peter Wallison argues that the crisis was caused by the bursting of a real estate bubble that was supported largely by low or no-down-payment loans, which was uniquely the case for U.S. residential housing loans. He states: "It is not true that every bubble – even a large bubble – has the potential to cause a financial crisis when it deflates." As an example, Wallison notes that other developed countries had "large bubbles during the 1997–2007 period" but "the losses associated with mortgage delinquencies and defaults when these bubbles deflated were far lower than the losses suffered in the United States when the 1997–2007 [bubble] deflated."

Other analysis calls into question the validity of comparing the residential loan crisis to the commercial loan crisis. After researching the default of commercial loans during the financial crisis, Xudong An and Anthony B. Sanders reported (in December 2010): "We find limited evidence that substantial deterioration in CMBS [commercial mortgage-backed securities] loan underwriting occurred prior to the crisis." Other analysts support the contention that the crisis in commercial real estate and related lending took place after the crisis in residential real estate. Business journalist Kimberly Amadeo wrote "The first signs of decline in residential real estate occurred in 2006. Three years later, commercial real estate started feeling the effects." Denice A. Gierach, a real estate attorney and CPA, wrote:

...most of the commercial real estate loans were good loans destroyed by a really bad economy. In other words, the borrowers did not cause the loans to go bad, it was the economy.

A second counter-argument to Wallison's dissent is that the definition of "non-traditional mortgages" used in Pinto's analysis overstated the number of risky mortgages in the system by including Alt-A, which was not necessarily high-risk. Krugman explained in July 2011 that the data provided by Pinto significantly overstated the number of subprime loans, citing the work of economist Mike Konczal: "As Konczal says, all of this stuff relies on a form of three-card monte: you talk about 'subprime and other high-risk' loans, lumping subprime with other loans that are not, it turns out, anywhere near as risky as actual subprime; then use this essentially fake aggregate to make it seem as if Fannie/Freddie were actually at the core of the problem."

=== Other contributing factors ===
==== Policies of central banks ====
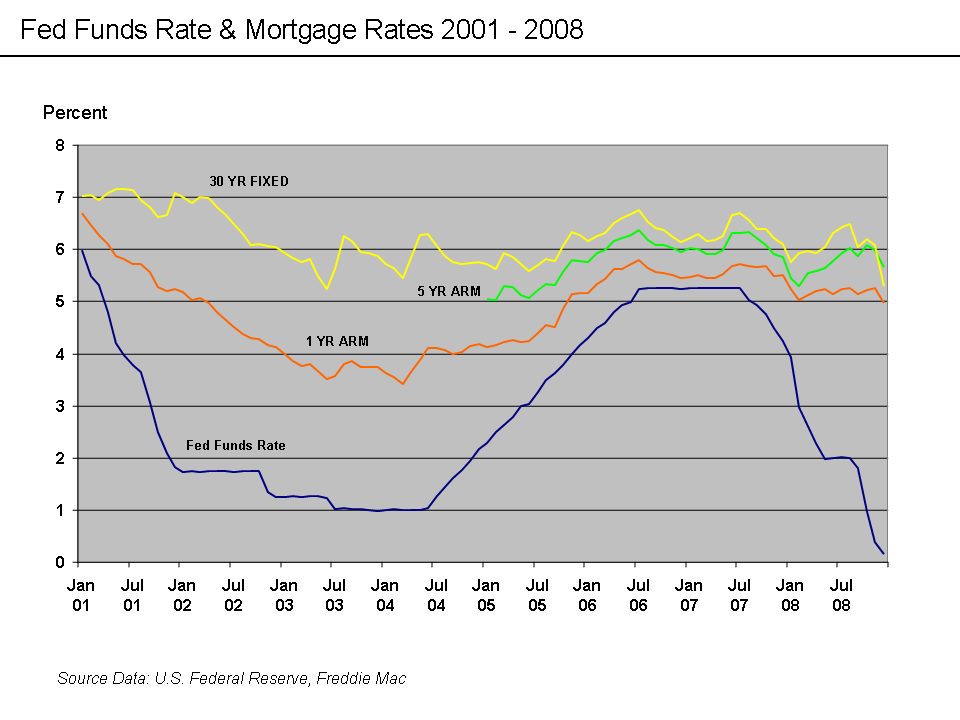
Federal funds rate and various mortgage rates

Central banks manage monetary policy and may target the rate of inflation. They have some authority over commercial banks and possibly other financial institutions. They are less concerned with avoiding asset price bubbles, such as the housing bubble and dot-com bubble. Central banks have generally chosen to react after such bubbles burst so as to minimize collateral damage to the economy, rather than trying to prevent or stop the bubble itself. This is because identifying an asset bubble and determining the proper monetary policy to deflate it are matters of debate among economists.

Some market observers have been concerned that Federal Reserve actions could give rise to moral hazard. A Government Accountability Office critic said that the Federal Reserve Bank of New York's rescue of Long-Term Capital Management in 1998 would encourage large financial institutions to believe that the Federal Reserve would intervene on their behalf if risky loans went sour because they were "too big to fail."

A contributing factor to the rise in house prices was the Federal Reserve's lowering of interest rates early in the decade. From 2000 to 2003, the Federal Reserve lowered the federal funds rate target from 6.5% to 1.0%. This was done to soften the effects of the collapse of the dot-com bubble and of the September 2001 terrorist attacks, and to combat the perceived risk of deflation.

The Fed believed that interest rates could be lowered safely primarily because the rate of inflation was low; it disregarded other important factors. According to Richard W. Fisher, President and CEO of the Federal Reserve Bank of Dallas, the Fed's interest rate policy during the early 2000s (decade) was misguided, because measured inflation in those years was below true inflation, which led to a monetary policy that contributed to the housing bubble.

Ben Bernanke and Alan Greenspan — both former chairmen of the Federal Reserve — disagree, arguing decisions on purchasing a home depends on long-term interest rates on mortgages not the short-term rates controlled by the Fed. According to Greenspan, "between 1971 and 2002, the fed funds rate and the mortgage rate moved in lock-step," but when the Fed started to raise rates in 2004, mortgage rates diverged, continuing to fall (or at least not rise) for another year (see "Fed Funds Rate & Mortgage Rates" graph). Construction of new homes did not peak until January 2006. Bernanke speculates that a world wide "saving glut" pushed capital or savings into the United States, keeping long-term interest rates low and independent of Central Bank action.

Agreeing with Fisher that the low interest rate policy of the Greenspan Fed both allowed and motivated investors to seek out risk investments offering higher returns, is finance economist Raghuram Rajan who argues that the underlying causes of the American economy's tendency to go "from bubble to bubble" fueled by unsustainable monetary stimulation, are the "weak safety nets" for the unemployed, which made "the US political system ... acutely sensitive to job growth"; and attempts to compensate for the stagnant income of the middle and lower classes with easy credit to boost their consumption.

Economist Thomas Sowell wrote that the Fed's decision to steadily raise interest rates was a key factor that ended the housing bubble. The Fed raised rates from the unusually low level of 1% in 2004 to a more typical 5.25% in 2006. By driving mortgage rates higher, the Fed "made monthly mortgage payments more expensive and therefore reduced the demand for housing." He referred to the Fed action as the "nudge" that collapsed the "house of cards" created by lax lending standards, affordable housing policies, and the preceding period of low interest rates.

==== Mark-to-market accounting rule ====
Former Federal Deposit Insurance Corporation Chair William Isaac placed much of the blame for the subprime mortgage crisis on the Securities and Exchange Commission and its fair-value accounting rules, especially the requirement for banks to mark their assets to market, particularly mortgage-backed securities. Whether or not this is true has been the subject of ongoing debate.

The debate arises because this accounting rule requires companies to adjust the value of marketable securities (such as the mortgage-backed securities (MBS) at the center of the crisis) to their market value. The intent of the standard is to help investors understand the value of these assets at a point in time, rather than just their historical purchase price. Because the market for these assets is distressed, it is difficult to sell many MBS at other than prices which may (or may not) be reflective of market stresses, which may be below the value that the mortgage cash flow related to the MBS would merit. As initially interpreted by companies and their auditors, the typically lower sale value was used as the market value rather than the cash flow value. Many large financial institutions recognized significant losses during 2007 and 2008 as a result of marking-down MBS asset prices to market value.

==== Globalization, technology and the trade deficit ====
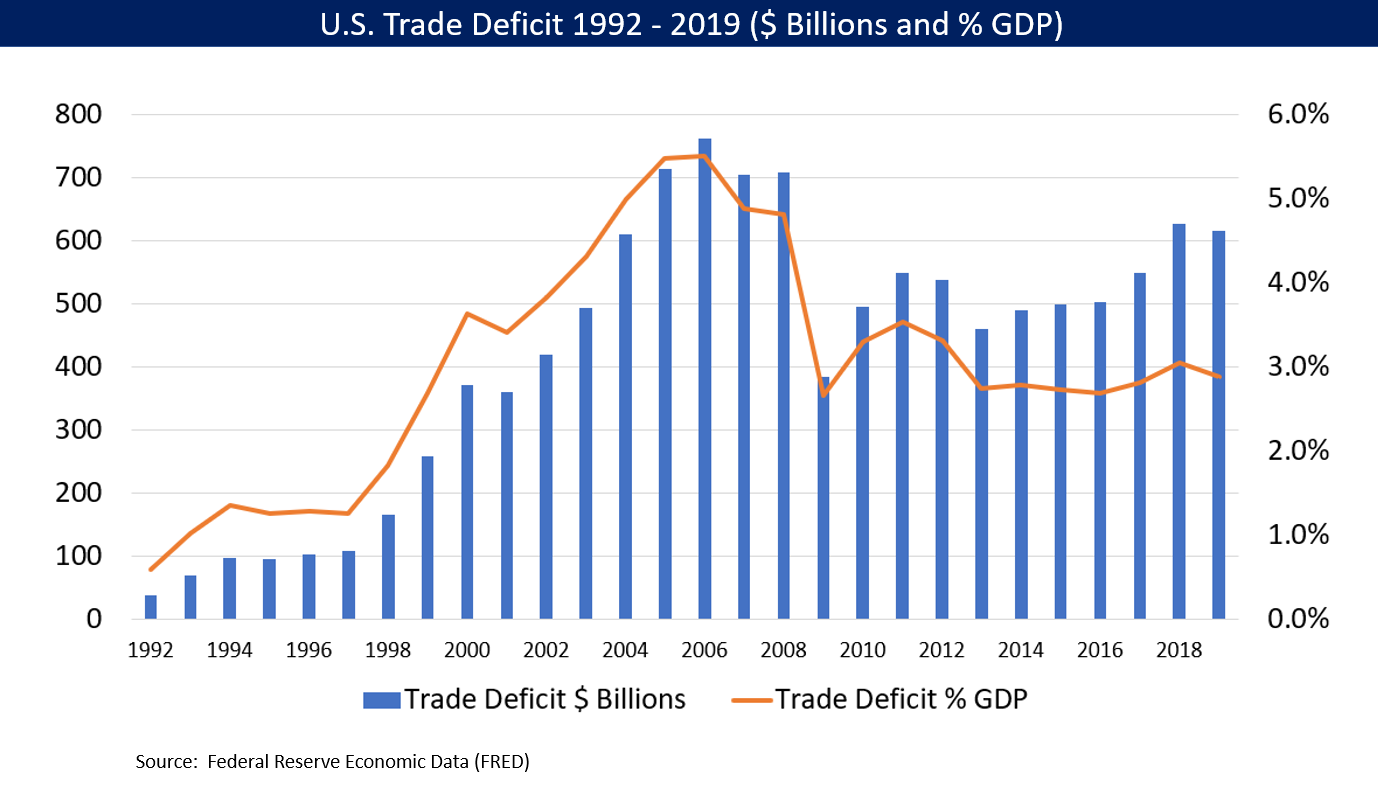
U.S. current account or trade deficit through 2012

In 2005, Ben Bernanke addressed the implications of the United States's high and rising current account deficit, resulting from U.S. investment exceeding its savings, or imports exceeding exports. Between 1996 and 2004, the U.S. current account deficit increased by $650 billion, from 1.5% to 5.8% of GDP. The U.S. attracted a great deal of foreign investment, mainly from the emerging economies in Asia and oil-exporting nations. The balance of payments identity requires that a country (such as the U.S.) running a current account deficit also have a capital account (investment) surplus of the same amount. Foreign investors had these funds to lend, either because they had very high personal savings rates (as high as 40% in China), or because of high oil prices.

Bernanke referred to this as a "saving glut" that may have pushed capital into the United States, a view differing from that of some other economists, who view such capital as having been pulled into the U.S. by its high consumption levels. In other words, a nation cannot consume more than its income unless it sells assets to foreigners, or foreigners are willing to lend to it. Alternatively, if a nation wishes to increase domestic investment in plant and equipment, it will also increase its level of imports to maintain balance if it has a floating exchange rate.

Regardless of the push or pull view, a "flood" of funds (capital or liquidity) reached the U.S. financial market. Foreign governments supplied funds by purchasing U.S. Treasury bonds and thus avoided much of the direct impact of the crisis. American households, on the other hand, used funds borrowed from foreigners to finance consumption or to bid up the prices of housing and financial assets. Financial institutions invested foreign funds in mortgage-backed securities. American housing and financial assets dramatically declined in value after the housing bubble burst.

Economist Joseph Stiglitz wrote in October 2011 that the recession and high unemployment of the 2009–2011 period was years in the making and driven by: unsustainable consumption; high manufacturing productivity outpacing demand thereby increasing unemployment; income inequality that shifted income from those who tended to spend it (i.e., the middle class) to those who do not (i.e., the wealthy); and emerging market's buildup of reserves (to the tune of $7.6 trillion by 2011) which was not spent. These factors all led to a "massive" shortfall in aggregate demand, which was "papered over" by demand related to the housing bubble until it burst.

== Subprime mortgage crisis phases ==
=== January 2007 to March 2008 ===
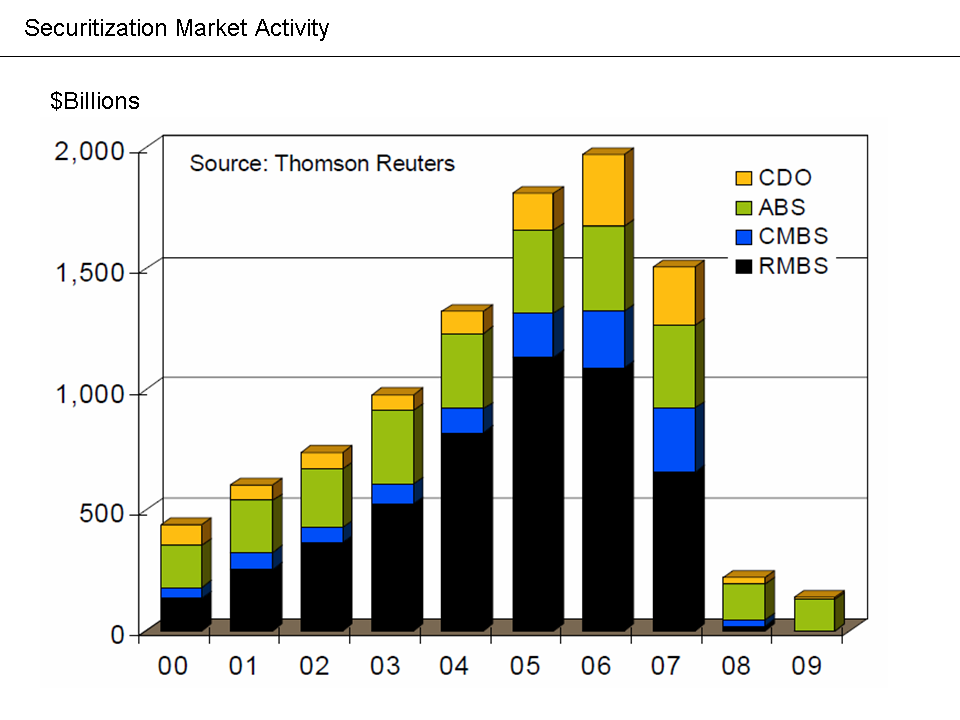
Securitization markets were impaired during the crisis.

Financial market stresses became apparent during 2007 that resulted in sizable losses across the financial system, the bankruptcy of over 100 mortgage lenders and the emergency sale of investment bank Bear Stearns in March 2008 to depository bank JP Morgan Chase. Some writers began referring to the events in the financial markets during this period the "Subprime Mortgage Crisis" or the "Mortgage crisis".

As U.S. housing prices began to fall from their 2006 peak, global investors became less willing to invest in mortgage-backed securities (MBS). The crisis began to affect the financial sector in February 2007, when HSBC, one of the world's largest banks, said its charge for bad debts would be $10.5 billion (~$15.7 billion in 2025), 20% higher than expectations. The increase was driven by increased expected losses in its US mortgage portfolio; this was the first major subprime related loss to be reported. By April 2007, over 50 mortgage companies had declared bankruptcy, many of which had specialized in subprime mortgages, the largest of which was New Century Financial. At least 100 mortgage companies either shut down, suspended operations or were sold during 2007. These mortgage companies made money on the origination and sale of mortgages, rather than interest from holding the mortgage. They had relied on continuing access to this global pool of investor capital to continue their operations; when investor capital dried-up, they were forced into bankruptcy.

Other parts of the shadow banking system also encountered difficulty. Legal entities known as structured investment vehicles (SIV) and hedge funds had borrowed from investors and bought MBS's. When mortgage defaults rose along with the fall in housing prices, the value of the MBS declined. Investors demanded that these entities put up additional collateral or be forced to pay back the investors immediately, a form of margin call. This resulted in further sales of MBS, which lowered MBS prices further. This dynamic of margin call and price reductions contributed to the collapse of two Bear Stearns hedge funds in July 2007, an event which economist Mark Zandi referred to as "arguably the proximate catalyst" of the crisis in financial markets. On August 9, 2007, French bank BNP Paribas announced that it was halting redemptions on three investment funds due to subprime problems, another "beginning point" of the crisis to some observers.

Investment banks such as Bear Stearns had legal obligations to provide financial support to these entities, which created a cash drain. Bear Stearns reported the first quarterly loss in its history during November 2007 and obtained additional financing from a Chinese sovereign wealth fund. Investment banks Merrill and Morgan Stanley had also obtained additional capital from sovereign wealth funds in Asia and the Middle East during late 2007.

The major investment banks had also increased their own borrowing and investing as the bubble expanded, taking on additional risk in the search for profit. For example, as of November 30, 2006, Bear Stearns reported $383.6 billion in liabilities and $11.8 billion in equity, a leverage ratio of approximately 33. This high leverage ratio meant that only a 3% reduction in the value of its assets would render it insolvent. Unable to withstand the combination of high leverage, reduced access to capital, loss in the value of its MBS securities portfolio, and claims from its hedge funds, Bear Stearns collapsed during March 2008. Historian Robin Blackburn wrote: "The Wall Street investment banks and brokerages hemorrhaged $175 billion of capital in the period July 2007 to March 2008, and Bear Stearns, the fifth largest, was 'rescued' in March, at a fire-sale price, by JP Morgan Chase with the help of $29 billion of guarantees from the Federal Reserve."

=== April to December 2008 ===
The TED spread, an indicator of credit risk, increased dramatically during September 2008.

Financial market conditions continued to worsen during 2008. Simultaneously, the price of oil had been rising steadily since mid-2007 from an already high value (100$) to a peak of 191$ in June 2008, which exacerbated market woes.

By August 2008, financial firms worldwide had written down their holdings of subprime related securities by US$501 billion (~$734 billion in 2025). The IMF estimated that financial institutions worldwide would eventually have to write off $1.5 trillion of their holdings of subprime MBSs. About $750 billion in such losses had been recognized as of November 2008. These losses wiped out much of the capital of the world banking system.

Banks are required to maintain a ratio of liquid capital for every dollar of credit extended to consumers and businesses. Thus the massive reduction in bank capital during the 2008 financial crisis reduced the credit available to businesses and households.

The crisis hit a critical point in September 2008 with the failure, buyout or bailout of the largest entities in the U.S. shadow banking system. Investment bank Lehman Brothers failed, while Merrill was acquired by Bank of America. Investment banks Goldman Sachs and Morgan Stanley obtained depository bank holding charters, which gave them access to emergency lines of credit from the Federal Reserve. Government-sponsored enterprises Fannie Mae and Freddie Mac were taken over by the federal government. Insurance giant AIG, which had sold insurance-like protection for mortgage-backed securities, did not have the capital to honor its commitments; U.S. taxpayers covered its obligations instead in a bailout that exceeded $100 billion.

Further, there was the equivalent of a bank run on other parts of the shadow system, which severely disrupted the ability of non-financial institutions to obtain the funds to run their daily operations. During a one-week period in September 2008, $170 billion (~$249 billion in 2025) were withdrawn from US money funds, causing the Federal Reserve to announce that it would guarantee these funds up to a point. The money market had been a key source of credit for banks (CDs) and nonfinancial firms (commercial paper). The TED spread (see graph above), a measure of the risk of interbank lending, quadrupled shortly after the Lehman failure. This credit freeze brought the global financial system to the brink of collapse.

In a meeting on September 18, 2008, Treasury Secretary Henry Paulson and Fed Chairman Ben Bernanke met with key legislators to propose a $700 billion (~$1.03 trillion in 2025) emergency bailout of the banking system. Bernanke reportedly told them: "If we don't do this, we may not have an economy on Monday." The Emergency Economic Stabilization Act, also called the Troubled Asset Relief Program (TARP), was signed into law on October 3, 2008.

In a nine-day period from October 1–9, the S&P 500 fell a staggering 251 points, losing 21.6% of its value. The week of October 6–10 saw the largest percentage drop in the history of the Dow Jones Industrial Average – even worse than any single week in the Great Depression.

The response of the US Federal Reserve, the European Central Bank, and other central banks was dramatic. During the last quarter of 2008, these central banks purchased US$2.5 (~$3.67 trillion in 2025) trillion of government debt and troubled private assets from banks. This was the largest liquidity injection into the credit market, and the largest monetary policy action, in world history. The governments of European nations and the US also raised the capital of their national banking systems by $1.5 trillion, by purchasing newly issued preferred stock in their major banks. On December 16, 2008, the Federal Reserve cut the Federal funds rate to 0–0.25%, where it remained until December 2015; this period of zero interest-rate policy was unprecedented in U.S. history.

== Impacts ==
The International Monetary Fund estimated that large U.S. and European banks lost more than $1 trillion on toxic assets and from bad loans from January 2007 to September 2009. These losses were expected to top $2.8 trillion from 2007 to 2010. U.S. banks losses were forecast to hit $1 trillion and European bank losses will reach $1.6 trillion. The IMF estimated that U.S. banks were about 60 through their losses, but British and eurozone banks only 40%.

=== Impact in the U.S. ===
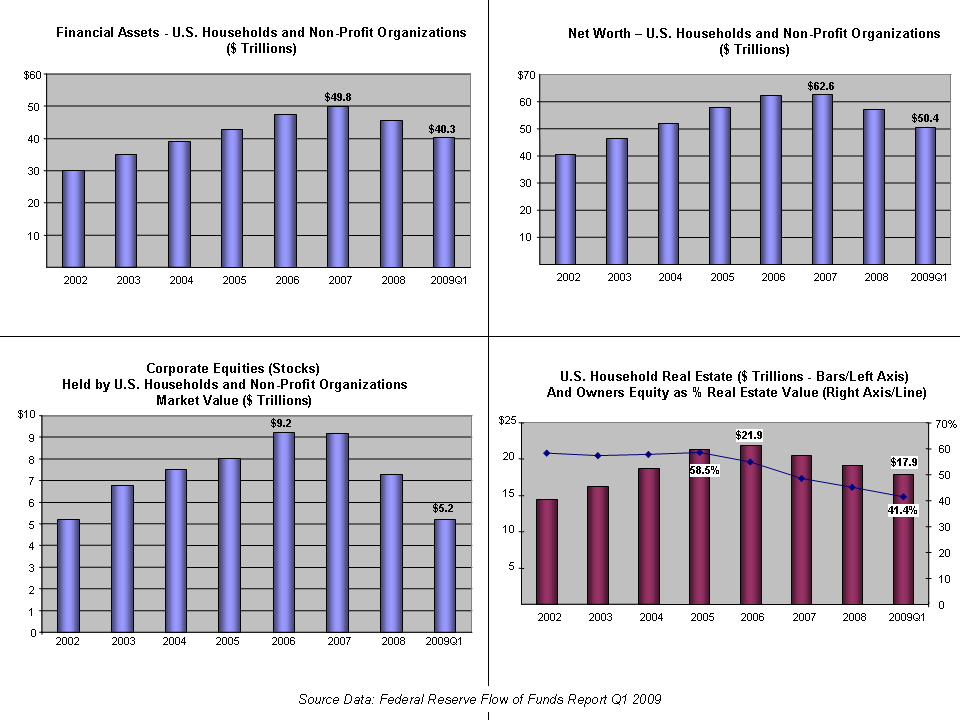
Impacts from the crisis on key wealth measures

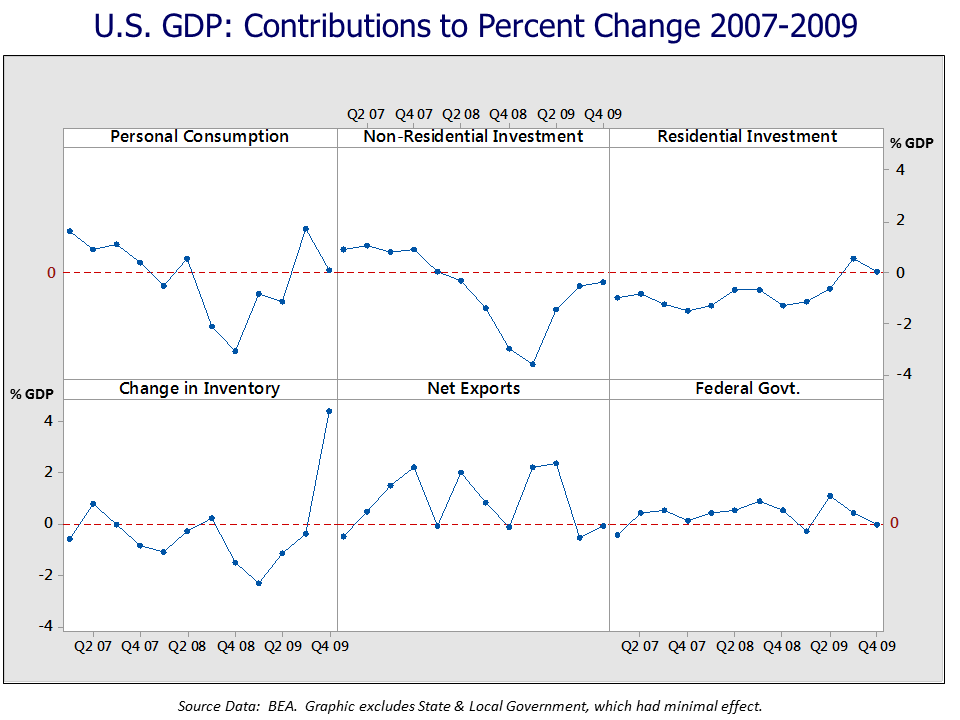
U.S. Real GDP – Contributions to percent change by component 2007–2009

Between June 2007 and November 2008, Americans lost more than a quarter of their net worth. By early November 2008, a broad U.S. stock index, the S&P 500, was down 45% from its 2007 high. Housing prices had dropped 20% from their 2006 peak, with futures markets signaling a 30–35% potential drop. Total home equity in the United States, which was valued at $13 trillion at its peak in 2006, had dropped to $8.8 trillion by mid-2008 and was still falling in late 2008. Total retirement assets, Americans' second-largest household asset, dropped by 22%, from $10.3 trillion in 2006 to $8 trillion in mid-2008. During the same period, savings and investment assets (apart from retirement savings) lost $1.2 trillion and pension assets lost $1.3 trillion. Taken together, these losses total $8.3 trillion.

- Real gross domestic product (GDP) began contracting in the third quarter of 2008 and did not return to growth until Q1 2010. CBO estimated in February 2013 that real U.S. GDP remained 5.5% below its potential level, or about $850 billion. CBO projected that GDP would not return to its potential level until 2017.
- The unemployment rate rose from 5% in 2008 pre-crisis to 10% by late 2009, then steadily declined to 7.6% by March 2013. The number of unemployed rose from approximately 7 million in 2008 pre-crisis to 15 million by 2009, then declined to 12 million by early 2013.
- Residential private investment (mainly housing) fell from its 2006 pre-crisis peak of $800 billion, to $400 billion by mid-2009 and has remained depressed at that level. Non-residential investment (mainly business purchases of capital equipment) peaked at $1,700 billion in 2008 pre-crisis and fell to $1,300 billion in 2010, but by early 2013 had nearly recovered to this peak.
- Housing prices fell approximately 30% on average from their mid-2006 peak to mid-2009 and remained at approximately that level as of March 2013.
- Stock market prices, as measured by the S&P 500 index, fell 57% from their October 2007 peak of 1,565 to a trough of 676 in March 2009. Stock prices began a steady climb thereafter and returned to record levels by April 2013.
- The net worth of U.S. households and non-profit organizations fell from a peak of approximately $67 trillion in 2007 to a trough of $52 trillion in 2009, a decline of $15 trillion or 22%. It began to recover thereafter and was $66 trillion by Q3 2012.
- U.S. total national debt rose from 66% GDP in 2008 pre-crisis to over 103% by the end of 2012. Martin Wolf and Paul Krugman argued that the rise in private savings and decline in investment fueled a large private sector surplus, which drove sizable budget deficits.

Members of US minority groups received a disproportionate number of subprime mortgages, and so have experienced a disproportionate level of the resulting foreclosures. A study commissioned by the ACLU on the long-term consequences of these discriminatory lending practices found that the housing crisis will likely widen the black-white wealth gap for the next generation. Borrowers with complex mortgages experienced substantially higher default rates than borrowers with traditional mortgages with similar characteristics. The crisis had a devastating effect on the U.S. auto industry. New vehicle sales, which peaked at 17 million in 2005, recovered to only 12 million by 2010.

=== Impact on Europe ===
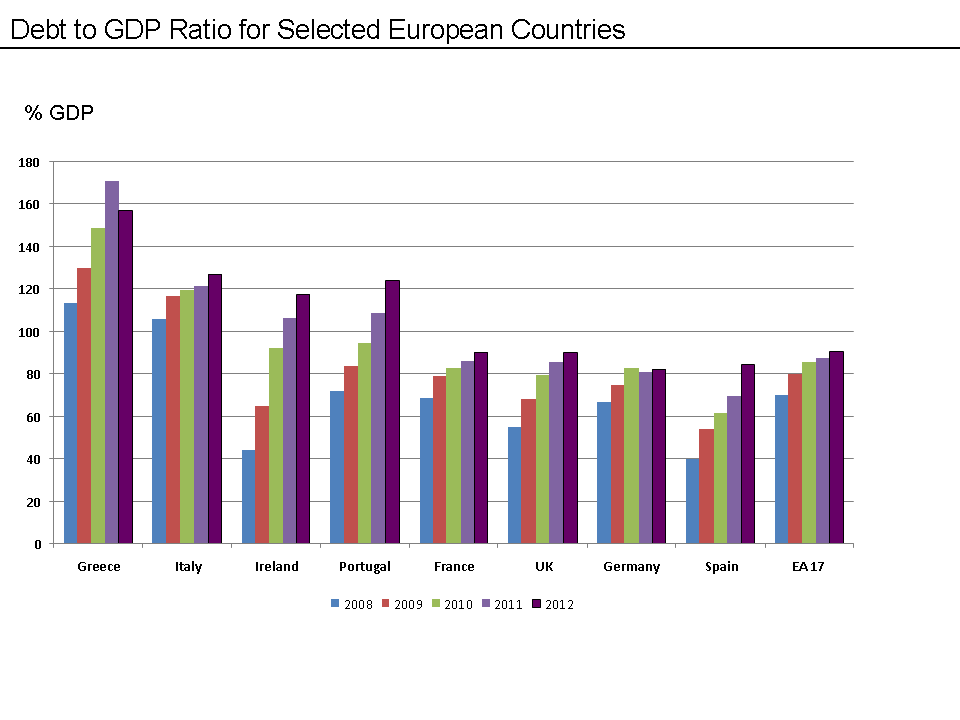
Public debt to GDP ratio for selected European countries – 2008 to 2012.

The crisis in Europe generally progressed from banking system crises to sovereign debt crises, as many countries elected to bail out their banking systems using taxpayer money. Greece was different in that it concealed large public debts in addition to issues within its banking system. Several countries received bailout packages from the "troika" (European Commission, European Central Bank, International Monetary Fund), which also implemented a series of emergency measures.

Many European countries embarked on austerity programs, reducing their budget deficits relative to GDP from 2010 to 2011. For example, according to the CIA World Factbook Greece improved its budget deficit from 10.4% GDP in 2010 to 9.6% in 2011. Iceland, Italy, Ireland, Portugal, France, and Spain also improved their budget deficits from 2010 to 2011 relative to GDP.

However, with the exception of Germany, each of these countries had public-debt-to-GDP ratios that increased (i.e., worsened) from 2010 to 2011, as indicated in the chart shown here. Greece's public-debt-to-GDP ratio increased from 143% in 2010 to 165% in 2011. This indicates that despite improving budget deficits, GDP growth was not sufficient to support a decline (improvement) in the debt-to-GDP ratio for these countries during this period. Eurostat reported that the debt to GDP ratio for the 17 Euro area countries together was 70.1% in 2008, 79.9% in 2009, 85.3% in 2010, and 87.2% in 2011.

Unemployment is another variable that might be considered in evaluating austerity measures. According to the CIA World Factbook, from 2010 to 2011, the unemployment rates in Spain, Greece, Ireland, Portugal, and the UK increased. France and Italy had no significant changes, while in Germany and Iceland the unemployment rate declined. Eurostat reported that Eurozone unemployment reached record levels in September 2012 at 11.6%, up from 10.3% the prior year. Unemployment varied significantly by country.

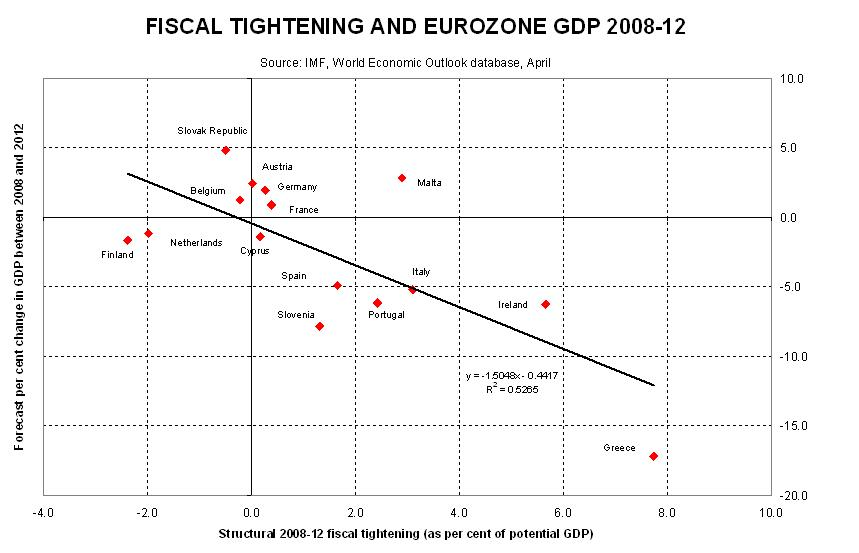
Relationship between fiscal tightening (austerity) in Eurozone countries with their GDP growth rate, 2008–2012

Economist Martin Wolf analyzed the relationship between cumulative GDP growth from 2008 to 2012 and total reduction in budget deficits due to austerity policies (see chart) in several European countries during April 2012. He concluded that: "In all, there is no evidence here that large fiscal contractions [budget deficit reductions] bring benefits to confidence and growth that offset the direct effects of the contractions. They bring exactly what one would expect: small contractions bring recessions and big contractions bring depressions." Changes in budget balances (deficits or surpluses) explained approximately 53% of the change in GDP, according to the equation derived from the IMF data used in his analysis.

Economist Paul Krugman analyzed the relationship between GDP and reduction in budget deficits for several European countries in April 2012 and concluded that austerity was slowing growth, similar to Martin Wolf. He also wrote: "this also implies that 1 euro of austerity yields only about 0.4 euros of reduced deficit, even in the short run. No wonder, then, that the whole austerity enterprise is spiraling into disaster."

=== Sustained effects ===
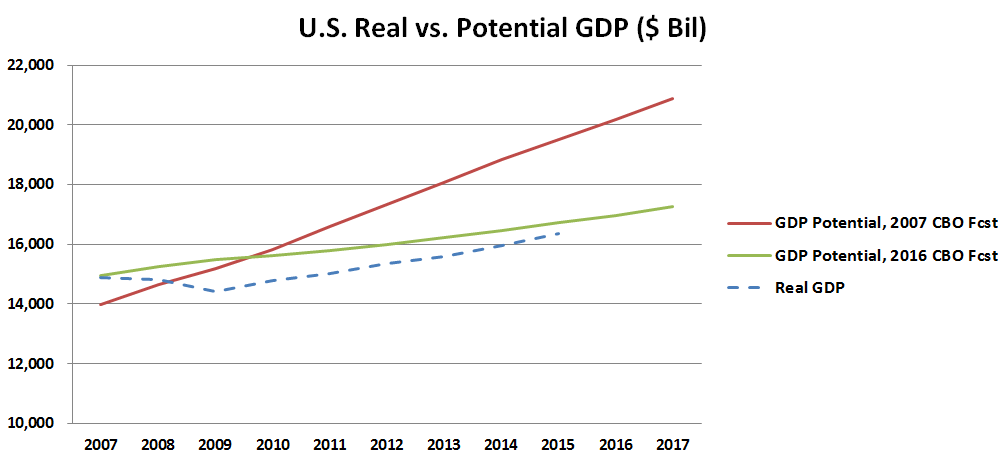
This chart compares U.S. potential GDP under two CBO forecasts (one from 2007 and one from 2016) versus the actual real GDP. It is based on a similar diagram from economist Larry Summers from 2014.

The crisis had a significant and long-lasting impact on U.S. employment. During the Great Recession, 8.5 million jobs were lost from the peak employment in early 2008 of approximately 138 million to the trough in February 2010 of 129 million, roughly 6% of the workforce. From February 2010 to September 2012, approximately 4.3 million jobs were added, offsetting roughly half the losses.

In Spring 2011 there were about a million homes in foreclosure in the United States, several million more in the pipeline, and 872,000 previously foreclosed homes in the hands of banks. Sales were slow; economists estimated that it would take three years to clear the backlogged inventory. According to Mark Zandi of Moody's Analytics, home prices were falling and could be expected to fall further during 2011. However, the rate of new borrowers falling behind in mortgage payments had begun to decrease.

The New York Times reported in January 2015 that: "About 17% of all homeowners are still 'upside down' on their mortgages ... That's down from 21% in the third quarter of 2013, and the 2012 peak of 31%." Foreclosures as of October 2014 were down 26% from the prior year, at 41,000 completed foreclosures. That was 65% below the peak in September 2010 (roughly 117,000), but still above the pre-crisis (2000–2006) average of 21,000 per month.

Research indicates recovery from financial crises can be protracted, with lengthy periods of high unemployment and substandard economic growth. Economist Carmen Reinhart stated in August 2011: "Debt de-leveraging [reduction] takes about seven years ... And in the decade following severe financial crises, you tend to grow by 1 to 1.5 percentage points less than in the decade before, because the decade before was fueled by a boom in private borrowing, and not all of that growth was real. The unemployment figures in advanced economies after falls are also very dark. Unemployment remains anchored about five percentage points above what it was in the decade before."

==== Savings surplus or investment deficit ====
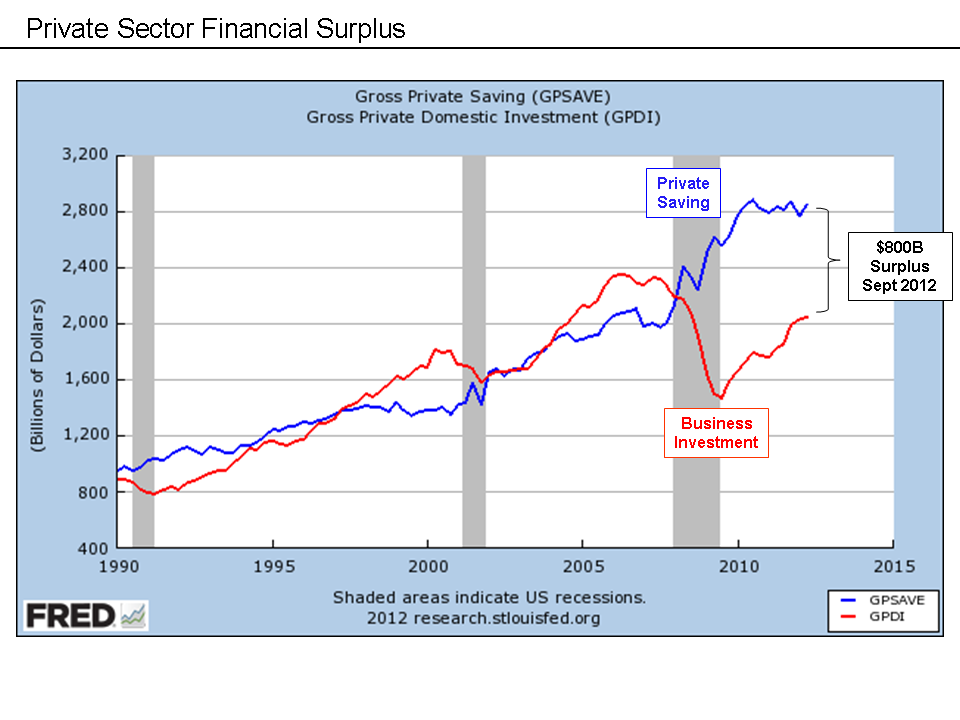
U.S. savings and investment; savings less investment is the private sector financial surplus

During the crisis and ensuing recession, U.S. consumers increased their savings as they paid down debt ("deleveraged") but corporations simultaneously were reducing their investment. In a healthy economy, private sector savings placed into the banking system is borrowed and invested by companies. This investment is one of the major components of GDP. A private sector financial deficit from 2004 to 2008 transitioned to a large surplus of savings over investment that exceeded $1 trillion by early 2009 and remained above $800 billion as of September 2012. Part of this investment reduction related to the housing market, a major component of investment in the GDP computation. This surplus explains how even significant government deficit spending would not increase interest rates and how Federal Reserve action to increase the money supply does not result in inflation, because the economy is awash with savings with no place to go.

Economist Richard Koo described similar effects for several of the developed world economies in December 2011:

Today private sectors in the U.S., the U.K., Spain, and Ireland (but not Greece) are undergoing massive deleveraging in spite of record low interest rates. This means these countries are all in serious balance sheet recessions. The private sectors in Japan and Germany are not borrowing, either. With borrowers disappearing and banks reluctant to lend, it is no wonder that, after nearly three years of record low interest rates and massive liquidity injections, industrial economies are still doing so poorly. Flow of funds data for the U.S. show a massive shift away from borrowing to savings by the private sector since the housing bubble burst in 2007. The shift for the private sector as a whole represents over 9 percent of U.S. GDP at a time of zero interest rates. Moreover, this increase in private sector savings exceeds the increase in government borrowings (5.8 percent of GDP), which suggests that the government is not doing enough to offset private sector deleveraging.

==== Sectoral financial balances ====
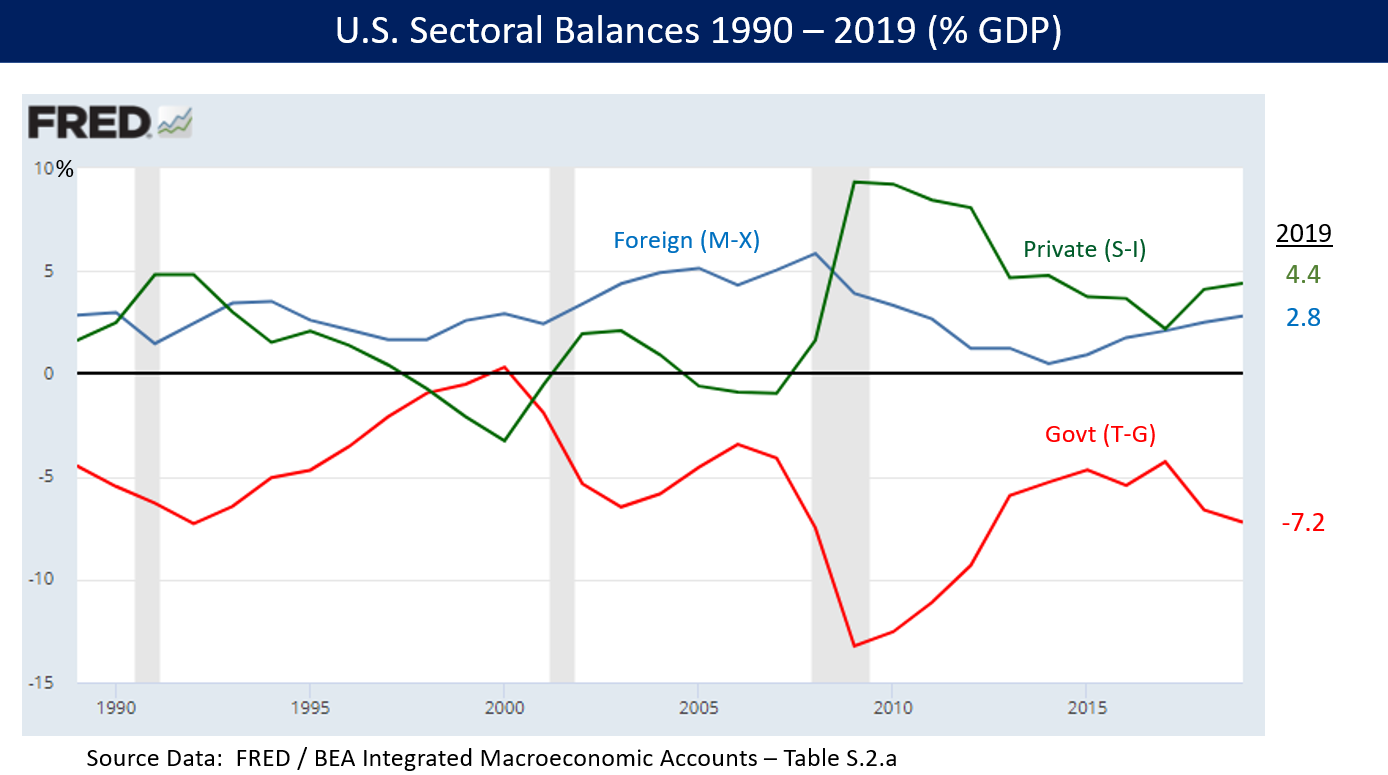
Sectoral financial balances in US economy 1990–2017. By definition, the three balances must net to zero. Since 2009, the US foreign surplus (trade deficit) and private sector surplus have driven a government budget deficit.

Economist Wynne Godley explained in 2004–2005 how U.S. sector imbalances posed a significant risk to the U.S. and global economy. The combination of a high and growing foreign sector surplus and high government sector deficit meant that the private sector was moving towards a net borrowing position (from surplus to deficit) as a housing bubble developed, which he warned was an unsustainable combination.

Economist Martin Wolf explained in July 2012 that government fiscal balance is one of three major financial sectoral balances in the U.S. economy, the others being the foreign financial sector and the private financial sector. The sum of the surpluses or deficits across these three sectors must be zero by definition. In the U.S., a foreign financial surplus (or capital surplus) exists because capital is imported (net) to fund the trade deficit. Further, there is a private sector financial surplus due to household savings exceeding business investment. By definition, there must therefore exist a government budget deficit so all three net to zero. The government sector includes federal, state and local. For example, the government budget deficit in 2011 was approximately 10% GDP (8.6% GDP of which was federal), offsetting a capital surplus of 4% GDP and a private sector surplus of 6% GDP.

Wolf argued that the sudden shift in the private sector from deficit to surplus forced the government balance into deficit, writing: "The financial balance of the private sector shifted towards surplus by the almost unbelievable cumulative total of 11.2 per cent of gross domestic product between the third quarter of 2007 and the second quarter of 2009, which was when the financial deficit of US government (federal and state) reached its peak...No fiscal policy changes explain the collapse into massive fiscal deficit between 2007 and 2009, because there was none of any importance. The collapse is explained by the massive shift of the private sector from financial deficit into surplus or, in other words, from boom to bust."

== Responses ==
Various actions have been taken since the crisis became apparent in August 2007. In September 2008, major instability in world financial markets increased awareness and attention to the crisis. Various agencies and regulators, as well as political officials, began to take additional, more comprehensive steps to handle the crisis.

To date, various government agencies have committed or spent trillions of dollars in loans, asset purchases, guarantees, and direct spending. For a summary of U.S. government financial commitments and investments related to the crisis, see CNN – Bailout Scorecard.

=== Federal Reserve Bank ===
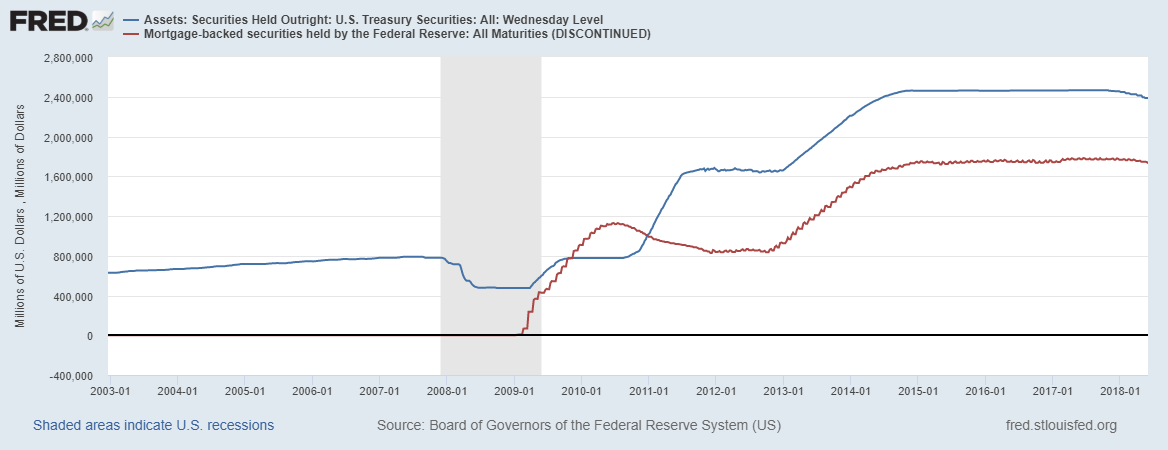
Federal Reserve holdings of treasury (blue) and mortgage-backed securities (red)

The central bank of the US, the Federal Reserve, in partnership with central banks worldwide, took several steps to address the crisis. Federal Reserve Chairman Ben Bernanke stated in early 2008: "Broadly, the Federal Reserve's response followed two tracks: efforts to support market liquidity and functioning and the pursuit of our macroeconomic objectives through monetary policy."

The Federal Reserve Bank:

- Lowered the target for the Federal funds rate from 5.25% to 2%, and the discount rate from 5.75% to 2.25%. This took place in six steps occurring between September 18, 2007, and April 30, 2008; In December 2008, the Fed further lowered the federal funds rate target to a range of 0–0.25% (25 basis points).
- Undertook, along with other central banks, open market operations to ensure member banks remain liquid. These are effectively short-term loans to member banks collateralized by government securities. Central banks have also lowered the interest rates (called the discount rate in the US) they charge member banks for short-term loans;
- Created a variety of lending facilities to enable the Fed to lend directly to banks and non-bank institutions, against specific types of collateral of varying credit quality. These include the Term Auction Facility (TAF) and Term Asset-Backed Securities Loan Facility (TALF).
- In November 2008, the Fed announced a $600 billion program to purchase the MBS of the GSE, to help lower mortgage rates.
- In March 2009, the Federal Open Market Committee decided to increase the size of the Federal Reserve's balance sheet further by purchasing up to an additional $750 billion of government-sponsored enterprise mortgage-backed securities, bringing its total purchases of these securities to up to $1.25 trillion this year, and to increase its purchases of agency debt this year by up to $100 billion to a total of up to $200 billion. Moreover, to help improve conditions in private credit markets, the Committee decided to purchase up to $300 billion of longer-term Treasury securities during 2009.

According to Ben Bernanke, expansion of the Fed balance sheet means the Fed is electronically creating money, necessary "because our economy is very weak and inflation is very low. When the economy begins to recover, that will be the time that we need to unwind those programs, raise interest rates, reduce the money supply, and make sure that we have a recovery that does not involve inflation."

The New York Times reported in February 2013 that the Fed continued to support the economy with various monetary stimulus measures: "The Fed, which has amassed almost $3 trillion in Treasury and mortgage-backed securities to promote more borrowing and lending, is expanding those holdings by $85 billion a month until it sees clear improvement in the labor market. It plans to hold short-term interest rates near zero even longer, at least until the unemployment rate falls below 6.5 percent."

=== Economic stimulus ===
On February 13, 2008, President George W. Bush signed into law a $168 billion (~$246 billion in 2025) economic stimulus package, mainly taking the form of income tax rebate checks mailed directly to taxpayers. Checks were mailed starting the week of April 28, 2008. However, this rebate coincided with an unexpected jump in gasoline and food prices. This coincidence led some to wonder whether the stimulus package would have the intended effect, or whether consumers would simply spend their rebates to cover higher food and fuel prices.

On February 17, 2009, U.S. President Barack Obama signed the American Recovery and Reinvestment Act of 2009, an $787 billion (~$1.15 trillion in 2025) stimulus package with a broad spectrum of spending and tax cuts. Over $75 billion of the package was specifically allocated to programs which help struggling homeowners. This program is referred to as the Homeowner Affordability and Stability Plan.

The U.S. government continued to run large deficits post-crisis, with the national debt rising from $10.0 trillion as of September 2008 to $16.1 trillion by September 2012. The debt increases were $1.89 trillion in fiscal year 2009, $1.65 trillion in 2010, $1.23 trillion in 2011, and $1.26 trillion in 2012.

=== Bank solvency and capital replenishment ===
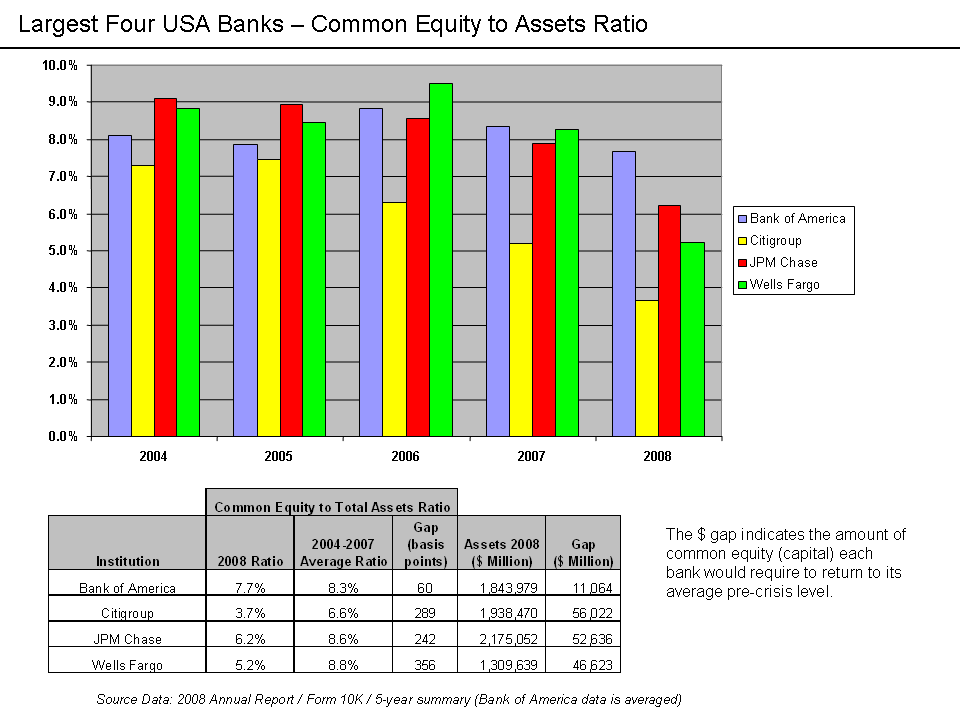
Common equity to total assets ratios for major US banks

Losses on mortgage-backed securities and other assets purchased with borrowed money dramatically reduced the capital base of financial institutions, rendering many either insolvent or less capable of lending. Governments provided funds to banks. Some banks took significant steps to acquire additional capital from private sources.

The U.S. government passed the Emergency Economic Stabilization Act of 2008 (EESA or TARP) during October 2008. This law included $700 billion in funding for the "Troubled Assets Relief Program" (TARP). Following a model initiated by the United Kingdom bank rescue package, $205 billion was used in the Capital Purchase Program to lend funds to banks in exchange for dividend-paying preferred stock.

Another method of recapitalizing banks is for government and private investors to provide cash in exchange for mortgage-related assets (i.e., "toxic" or "legacy" assets), improving the quality of bank capital while reducing uncertainty regarding the financial position of banks. U.S. Treasury Secretary Timothy Geithner announced a plan during March 2009 to purchase "legacy" or "toxic" assets from banks. The Public-Private Partnership Investment Program involved government loans and guarantees to encourage private investors to provide funds to purchase toxic assets from banks.

As of April 2012, the government had recovered $300 billion of the $414 billion that was ultimately distributed to them via TARP. Some elements of TARP such as foreclosure prevention aid will not be paid back. Estimated taxpayer losses were $60 billion. For a summary of U.S. government financial commitments and investments related to the crisis, see CNN – Bailout Scorecard. For a summary of TARP funds provided to U.S. banks as of December 2008, see Reuters-TARP Funds.

=== Bailouts and failures of financial firms ===
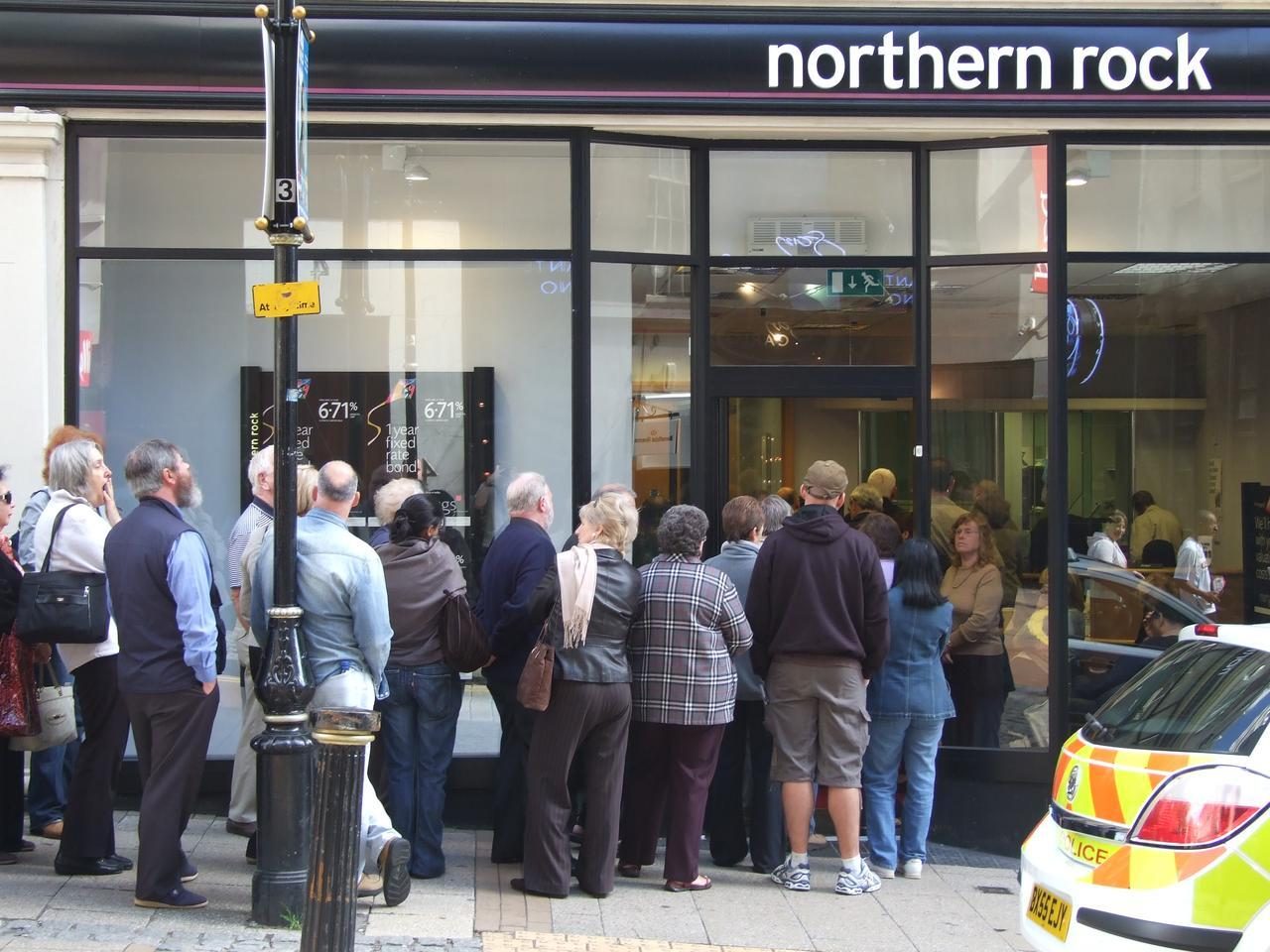
People queuing outside a Northern Rock bank branch in Birmingham, United Kingdom, on September 15, 2007, to withdraw their savings because of the subprime crisis

Several major financial institutions either failed, were bailed out by governments, or merged (voluntarily or otherwise) during the crisis. While the specific circumstances varied, in general the decline in the value of mortgage-backed securities held by these companies resulted in either their insolvency, the equivalent of bank runs as investors pulled funds from them, or inability to secure new funding in the credit markets. These firms had typically borrowed and invested large sums of money relative to their cash or equity capital, meaning they were highly leveraged and vulnerable to unanticipated credit market disruptions.

The five largest U.S. investment banks, with combined liabilities or debts of $4 trillion, either went bankrupt (Lehman Brothers), were taken over by other companies (Bear Stearns and Merrill), or were bailed out by the U.S. government (Goldman Sachs and Morgan Stanley) during 2008. Government-sponsored enterprises (GSE) Fannie Mae and Freddie Mac either directly owed or guaranteed nearly $5 trillion in mortgage obligations, with a similarly weak capital base, when they were placed into conservatorship in September 2008. For scale, this $9 trillion in obligations concentrated in seven highly leveraged institutions can be compared to the $14 trillion size of the U.S. economy (GDP) or to the total national debt of $10 trillion in September 2008.

Major depository banks worldwide had also used financial innovations such as structured investment vehicles to circumvent capital ratio regulations. Notable global failures included Northern Rock, which was nationalized at an estimated cost of £87 billion ($150 billion). In the U.S., Washington Mutual (WaMu) was seized in September 2008 by the US Office of Thrift Supervision (OTS). This would be followed by the "shotgun wedding" of Wells Fargo and Wachovia after it was speculated that without the merger Wachovia was also going to fail. Dozens of U.S. banks received funds as part of the TARP or $700 billion bailout. The TARP funds gained some controversy after PNC Financial Services received TARP money, only to turn around hours later and purchase the struggling National City Corp., which itself had become a victim of the subprime crisis.

As a result of the financial crisis in 2008, twenty-five U.S. banks became insolvent and were taken over by the FDIC. As of August 14, 2009, an additional 77 banks became insolvent. This seven-month tally surpasses the 50 banks that were seized in all of 1993, but is still much smaller than the number of failed banking institutions in 1992, 1991, and 1990. The United States has lost over 6 million jobs since the recession began in December 2007.

The FDIC deposit insurance fund, supported by fees on insured banks, fell to $13 billion (~$18.9 billion in 2025) in the first quarter of 2009. That is the lowest total since September 1993.

According to some, the bailouts could be traced directly to Alan Greenspan's efforts to reflate the stock market and the economy after the tech stock bust, and specifically to a February 23, 2004, speech Mr. Greenspan made to the Mortgage Bankers Association where he suggested that the time had come to push average American borrowers into more exotic loans with variable rates, or deferred interest. This argument suggests that Mr. Greenspan sought to enlist banks to expand lending and debt to stimulate asset prices and that the Federal Reserve and US Treasury Department would back any losses that might result. As early as March 2007 some commentators predicted that a bailout of the banks would exceed $1 trillion (~$1.49 trillion in 2025) , at a time when Ben Bernanke, Alan Greenspan and Henry Paulson all claimed that mortgage problems were "contained" to the subprime market and no bailout of the financial sector would be necessary.

=== Homeowner assistance ===
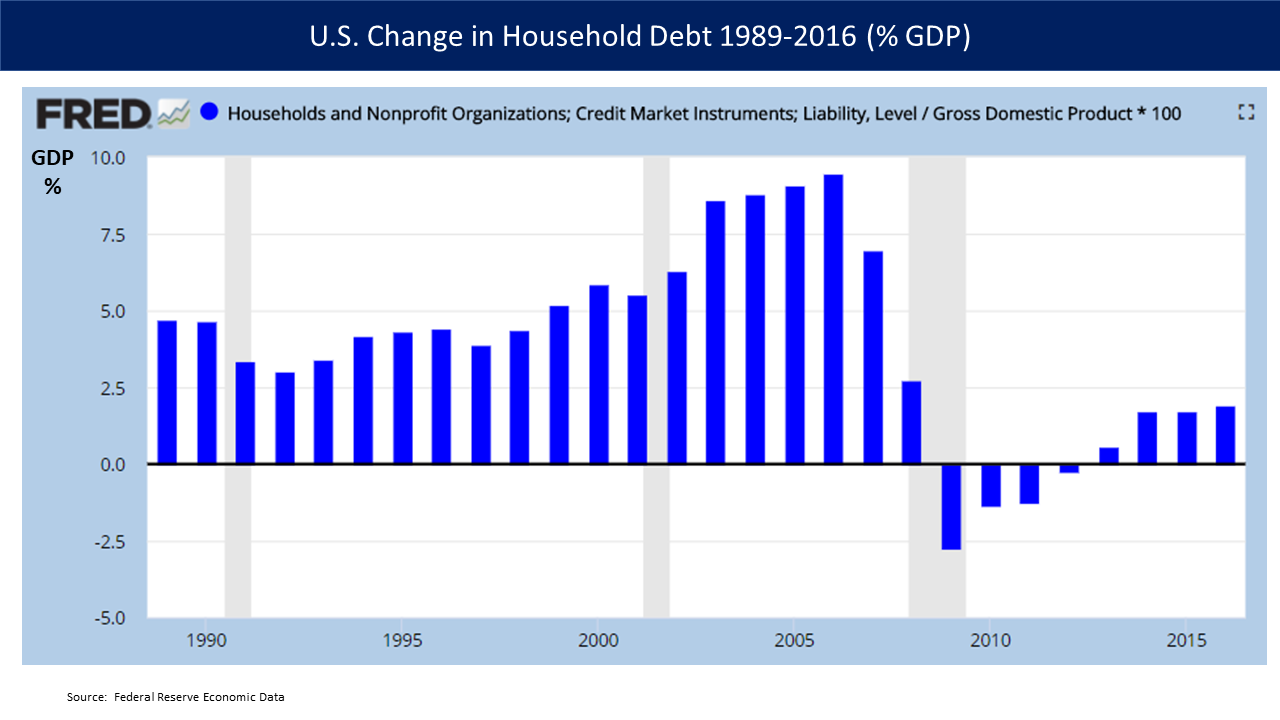
U.S. Changes in Household Debt as a percentage of GDP for 1989–2016. Homeowners paying down debt for 2009–2012 was a headwind to the recovery. Economist Carmen Reinhart explained that this behavior tends to slow recoveries from financial crises relative to typical recessions.

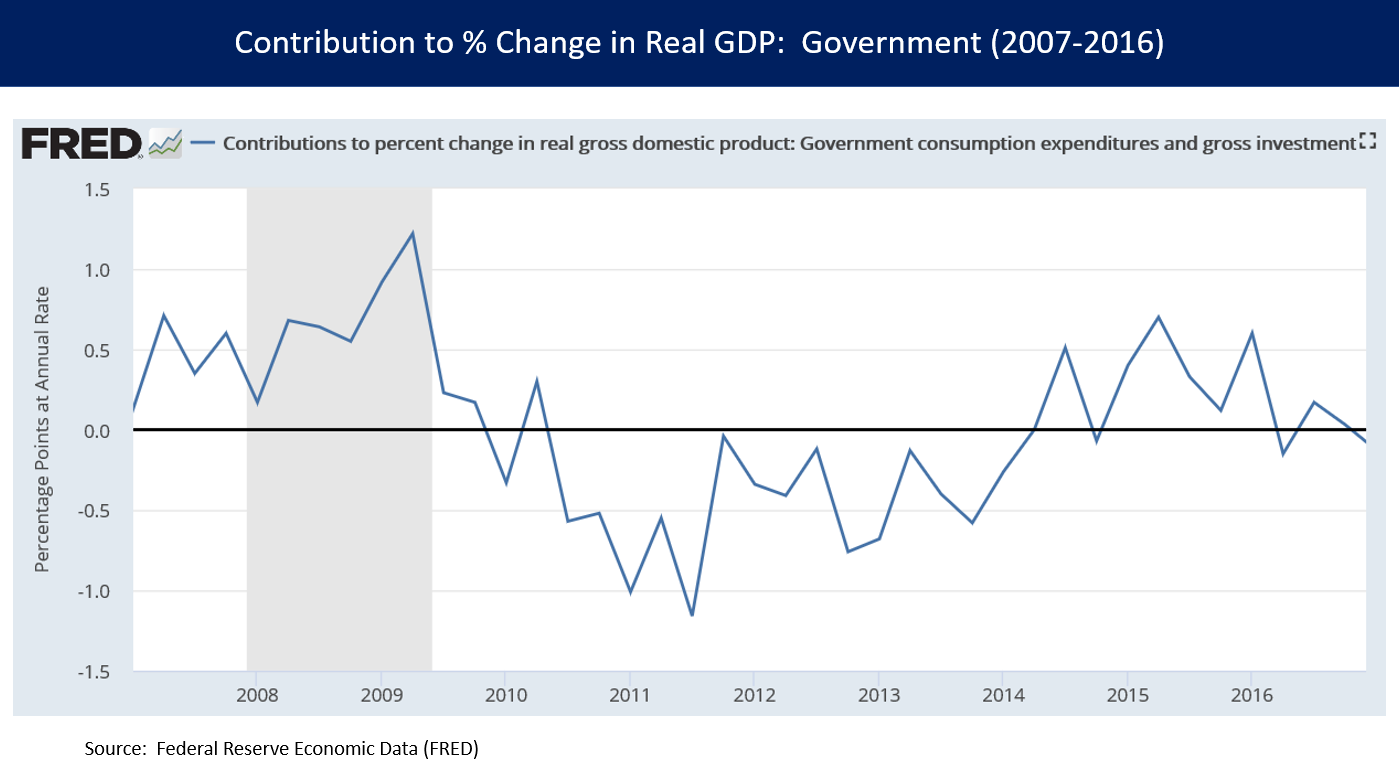
U.S. federal government spending was held relatively level around $3.5 trillion from 2009–2014, which created a headwind to recovery, reducing real GDP growth by approximately 0.5% per quarter (annualized) on average between Q3 2010 and Q2 2014.

Both lenders and borrowers may benefit from avoiding foreclosure, which is a costly and lengthy process. Some lenders have offered troubled borrowers more favorable mortgage terms (e.g., refinancing, loan modification, or loss mitigation). Borrowers have also been encouraged to contact their lenders to discuss alternatives.

The Economist described the issue this way in February 2009: "No part of the financial crisis has received so much attention, with so little to show for it, as the tidal wave of home foreclosures sweeping over America. Government programmes have been ineffectual, and private efforts not much better." Up to 9 million homes may enter foreclosure over the 2009–2011 period, versus one million in a typical year. At roughly U.S. $50,000 per foreclosure according to a 2006 study by the Chicago Federal Reserve Bank, 9 million foreclosures represented $450 billion in losses.

A variety of voluntary private and government-administered or supported programs were implemented during 2007–09 to assist homeowners with case-by-case mortgage assistance, to mitigate the foreclosure crisis engulfing the U.S. One example is the Hope Now Alliance, an ongoing collaborative effort between the US Government and private industry to help certain subprime borrowers. In February 2008, the Alliance reported that during the second half of 2007, it had helped 545,000 subprime borrowers with shaky credit, or 7.7% of 7.1 million subprime loans outstanding as of September 2007. A spokesperson for the Alliance acknowledged that much more must be done.

During late 2008, major banks and both Fannie Mae and Freddie Mac established moratoriums (delays) on foreclosures, to give homeowners time to work towards refinancing.

Critics have argued that the case-by-case loan modification method is ineffective, with too few homeowners assisted relative to the number of foreclosures and with nearly 40% of those assisted homeowners again becoming delinquent within 8 months. In December 2008, the U.S. FDIC reported that more than half of mortgages modified during the first half of 2008 were delinquent again, in many cases because payments were not reduced or mortgage debt was not forgiven. This is further evidence that case-by-case loan modification is not effective as a policy tool. In February 2009, economists Nouriel Roubini and Mark Zandi (ignoring the impact on lenders, and the alternative advocated by others of providing the money to homeowners) recommended an "across the board" (systemic) reduction of mortgage principal balances by 20–30%. Lowering the mortgage balance would help lower monthly payments and also affect an estimated 20 million homeowners that may have a financial incentive to enter voluntary foreclosure because they are "underwater" (i.e. the mortgage balance is larger than the home value). A study by the Federal Reserve Bank of Boston indicated, however, that banks were reluctant to modify loans. Only 3% of seriously delinquent homeowners had their mortgage payments reduced during 2008. In addition, investors who held MBS and had a say in mortgage modifications had not been a significant impediment; the study found no difference in the rate of assistance whether the loans were controlled by the bank or by investors. Commenting on the study, economists Dean Baker and Paul Willen both advocated providing funds directly to homeowners instead of banks.

The Los Angeles Times reported the results of a study that found homeowners with high credit scores at the time of entering the mortgage are 50% more likely to "strategically default" – abruptly and intentionally pull the plug and abandon the mortgage – compared with lower-scoring borrowers. Such strategic defaults were heavily concentrated in markets with the highest price declines. An estimated 588,000 strategic defaults occurred nationwide during 2008, more than double the total in 2007. They represented 18% of all serious delinquencies that extended for more than 60 days in the fourth quarter of 2008.

==== Homeowners Affordability and Stability Plan ====
On February 18, 2009, U.S. President Barack Obama announced a $73 billion program to help up to nine million homeowners avoid foreclosure, which was supplemented by $200 billion in additional funding for Fannie Mae and Freddie Mac to purchase and more easily refinance mortgages. The plan was funded mostly from the EESA's $700 billion financial bailout fund. It used cost sharing and incentives to encourage lenders to reduce homeowner's monthly payments to 31% of their monthly income. Under the program, a lender would be responsible for reducing monthly payments to no more than 38% of a borrower's income, with government sharing the cost to further cut the rate to 31%. The plan also involved forgiving a portion of the borrower's mortgage balance. Companies that service mortgages received incentives to modify loans and to help the homeowner stay current.

===== Loan modifications =====
Untold thousands of people have complained in recent years that they were subjected to a nightmare experience of lost paperwork, misapplied fees and Kafkaesque phone calls with clueless customer service representatives as they strived to avoid foreclosures they say were preventable. These claims are backed up by a swelling number of academic studies and insider accounts of misconduct and abuse.

Now it's becoming clear just how chaotic the whole system became. Depositions from employees working for the banks or their law firms depict a foreclosure process in which it was standard practice for employees with virtually no training to masquerade as vice presidents, sometimes signing documents on behalf of as many as 15 different banks. Together, the banks and their law firms created a quick-and-dirty foreclosure machine that was designed to rush through foreclosures as fast as possible.

== Regulatory proposals and long-term solutions ==
President Barack Obama and key advisers introduced a series of regulatory proposals in June 2009. The proposals address consumer protection, executive pay, bank financial cushions or capital requirements, expanded regulation of the shadow banking system and derivatives, and enhanced authority for the Federal Reserve to safely wind-down systemically important institutions, among others. The Dodd–Frank Wall Street Reform and Consumer Protection Act was signed into law in July 2010 to address some of the causes of the crisis.

U.S. Treasury Secretary Timothy Geithner testified before Congress on October 29, 2009. His testimony included five elements he stated as critical to effective reform:

1. Expand the Federal Deposit Insurance Corporation bank resolution mechanism to include non-bank financial institutions;
2. Ensure that a firm is allowed to fail in an orderly way and not be "rescued";
3. Ensure taxpayers are not on the hook for any losses, by applying losses to the firm's investors and creating a monetary pool funded by the largest financial institutions;
4. Apply appropriate checks and balances to the FDIC and Federal Reserve in this resolution process;
5. Require stronger capital and liquidity positions for financial firms and related regulatory authority.

The Dodd-Frank Act addressed these elements, but stopped short of breaking up the largest banks, which grew larger due to mergers of investment banks at the core of the crisis with depository banks (e.g., JP Morgan Chase acquired Bear Stearns and Bank of America acquired Merrill in 2008). Assets of five largest banks as a share of total commercial banking assets rose then stabilized in the wake of the crisis. During 2013, Senators John McCain (Republican) and Elizabeth Warren (Democratic) proposed a bill to separate investment and depository banking, to insulate depository banks from higher risk activities. These were separated prior to the 1999 repeal of the Glass-Steagall Act.

=== Law investigations, judicial and other responses ===
Significant law enforcement action and litigation resulted from the crisis. The U.S. Federal Bureau of Investigation probed the possibility of fraud by mortgage financing companies Fannie Mae and Freddie Mac, Lehman Brothers, and insurer American International Group, among others. New York Attorney General Andrew Cuomo sued Long Island based Amerimod, one of the nation's largest loan modification corporations for fraud, and issued numerous subpoenas to other similar companies. The FBI assigned more agents to mortgage-related crimes and its caseload dramatically increased. The FBI began a probe of Countrywide Financial in March 2008 for possible fraudulent lending practices and securities fraud.

Several hundred civil lawsuits were filed in federal courts beginning in 2007 related to the subprime crisis. The number of filings in state courts was not quantified but was also believed to be significant. In August 2014, Bank of America agreed to a near-$17 billion (~$22.7 billion in 2025) deal to settle claims against it relating to the sale of toxic mortgage-linked securities including subprime home loans, in what was believed to be the largest settlement in U.S. corporate history. The deal with the U.S. Justice Department topped a deal the regulator made the previous year with JPMorgan Chase over similar issues. Morgan Stanley paid $2.6 billion (~$3.45 billion in 2025) to settle claims in February 2015, without reaching closure on homeowner relief and state claim.

=== Bank fines and penalties ===
U.S. banks have paid considerable fines from legal settlements due to mortgage-related activities. The Economist estimated that from 2008 through October 2013, U.S. banks had agreed to $95 billion in mortgage-related penalties. Settlement amounts included Bank of America ($47.2B), JP Morgan Chase ($22.3B), Wells Fargo ($9.8B), Citigroup ($6.2B) and Goldman-Sachs ($0.9B). Bloomberg reported that from the end of 2010 to October 2013, the six largest Wall St. banks had agreed to pay $67 billion. CNBC reported in April 2015 that banking fines and penalties totaled $150 billion between 2007 and 2014, versus $700 billion in profits over that time.

Many of these fines were obtained via the efforts of President Obama's Financial Fraud Enforcement Task Force (FFETF), which was created in November 2009 to investigate and prosecute financial crimes. The FFETF involves over 20 federal agencies, 94 U.S. Attorney's offices, and state and local partners. One of its eight working groups, the Residential Mortgage Backed Securities (RMBS) Working Group, was created in 2012 and is involved in investigating and negotiating many of the fines and penalties described above.

== In popular culture ==
Several books written about the crisis were made into movies. Examples include The Big Short by Michael Lewis and Too Big to Fail by Andrew Ross Sorkin. The former tells the story from the perspective of several investors who bet against the housing market, while the latter follows key government and banking officials focusing on the critical events of September 2008, when many large financial institutions faced or experienced collapse. Margin Call is a film that tells the story of a day's events in a 2008 investment bank after its traders realize that their models fail to gauge the market and "the numbers don't add up anymore".

== Implications ==
VOA Special English Economics Report from October 2010 describing how millions of foreclosed homes were seized by banks

Estimates of impact have continued to climb. During April 2008, International Monetary Fund (IMF) estimated that global losses for financial institutions would approach $1 (~$1.50 in 2025) trillion. One year later, the IMF estimated cumulative losses of banks and other financial institutions globally would exceed $4 trillion.

Francis Fukuyama has argued that the crisis represents the end of Reaganism in the financial sector, which was characterized by lighter regulation, pared-back government, and lower taxes. Significant financial sector regulatory changes are expected as a result of the crisis.

Fareed Zakaria believes that the crisis may force Americans and their government to live within their means. Further, some of the best minds may be redeployed from financial engineering to more valuable business activities, or to science and technology.

Roger Altman wrote that "the crash of 2008 has inflicted profound damage on [the U.S.] financial system, its economy, and its standing in the world; the crisis is an important geopolitical setback...the crisis has coincided with historical forces that were already shifting the world's focus away from the United States. Over the medium term, the United States will have to operate from a smaller global platform – while others, especially China, will have a chance to rise faster."

GE CEO Jeffrey Immelt has argued that U.S. trade deficits and budget deficits are unsustainable. America must regain its competitiveness through innovative products, training of production workers, and business leadership. He advocates specific national goals related to energy security or independence, specific technologies, expansion of the manufacturing job base, and net exporter status. "The world has been reset. Now we must lead an aggressive American renewal to win in the future." Of critical importance, he said, is the need to focus on technology and manufacturing. "Many bought into the idea that America could go from a technology-based, export-oriented powerhouse to a services-led, consumption-based economy—and somehow still expect to prosper," Immelt said. "That idea was flat wrong."

Economist Paul Krugman wrote in 2009: "The prosperity of a few years ago, such as it was—profits were terrific, wages not so much – depended on a huge bubble in housing, which replaced an earlier huge bubble in stocks. And since the housing bubble isn't coming back, the spending that sustained the economy in the pre-crisis years isn't coming back either." Niall Ferguson stated that excluding the effect of home equity extraction, the U.S. economy grew at a 1% rate during the Bush years. Microsoft CEO Steve Ballmer has argued that this is an economic reset at a lower level, rather than a recession, meaning that no quick recovery to pre-recession levels can be expected.

The U.S. Federal government's efforts to support the global financial system have resulted in significant new financial commitments, totaling $7 trillion by November 2008. These commitments can be characterized as investments, loans, and loan guarantees, rather than direct expenditures. In many cases, the government purchased financial assets such as commercial paper, mortgage-backed securities, or other types of asset-backed paper, to enhance liquidity in frozen markets. As the crisis has progressed, the Fed has expanded the collateral against which it is willing to lend to include higher-risk assets.

The Economist wrote in May 2009: "Having spent a fortune bailing out their banks, Western governments will have to pay a price in terms of higher taxes to meet the interest on that debt. In the case of countries (like Britain and America) that have trade as well as budget deficits, those higher taxes will be needed to meet the claims of foreign creditors. Given the political implications of such austerity, the temptation will be to default by stealth, by letting their currencies depreciate. Investors are increasingly alive to this danger..."

The crisis has cast doubt on the legacy of Alan Greenspan, the Chairman of the Federal Reserve System from 1986 to January 2006. Senator Chris Dodd claimed that Greenspan created the "perfect storm". When asked to comment on the crisis, Greenspan spoke as follows:

The current credit crisis will come to an end when the overhang of inventories of newly built homes is largely liquidated, and home price deflation comes to an end. That will stabilize the now-uncertain value of the home equity that acts as a buffer for all home mortgages, but most importantly for those held as collateral for residential mortgage-backed securities. Very large losses will, no doubt, be taken as a consequence of the crisis. But after a period of protracted adjustment, the U.S. economy, and the world economy more generally, will be able to get back to business.

=== Post-recession home ownership by millennials ===
Following the recession of the 2008–2010 era, there became a bigger focus from millennials on how mortgages affect their personal finances. Most who were of working age were unable to find employment that would allow them to save enough for a house. The lack of good employment opportunities has created questions among this generation about how much of their lives that they are willing to invest into a home and if that money is not better spent elsewhere. Mortgage Magnitude looks at how many years of life a mortgage will actually cost a consumer given the area's median income and median home value, showing homes in metropolitan areas ranging from ratios of 1:5 to 1:10. Donna Fancher researched to find if the "American Dream" of owning a home is still a realistic goal, or if it is continually shrinking for the youth of the US, writing:

The value of owner-occupied housing also exceeds income growth. In many markets, prospective buyers are continuing to rent due to concerns over affordability. However, demand also increases rent disproportionately."

While housing prices fell dramatically during the recession, prices have been steadily coming back to pre-recession prices; with a rising interest rate, home ownership could continue to be challenging for millennials. Jason Furman wrote:

[...] while the unemployment rate for those over 34 peaked at about 8 percent, the unemployment rate among those between the ages of 18 and 34 peaked at 14 percent in 2010 and remains elevated, despite substantial improvement; delinquency rates on student loans have risen several percentage points since the Great Recession and even into the recovery; and the homeownership rate among young adults has dropped from a peak of 43 percent in 2005 to 37 percent in 2013 concurrent with a large increase in the share living with their parents.

== Recovery ==
=== In the United States ===
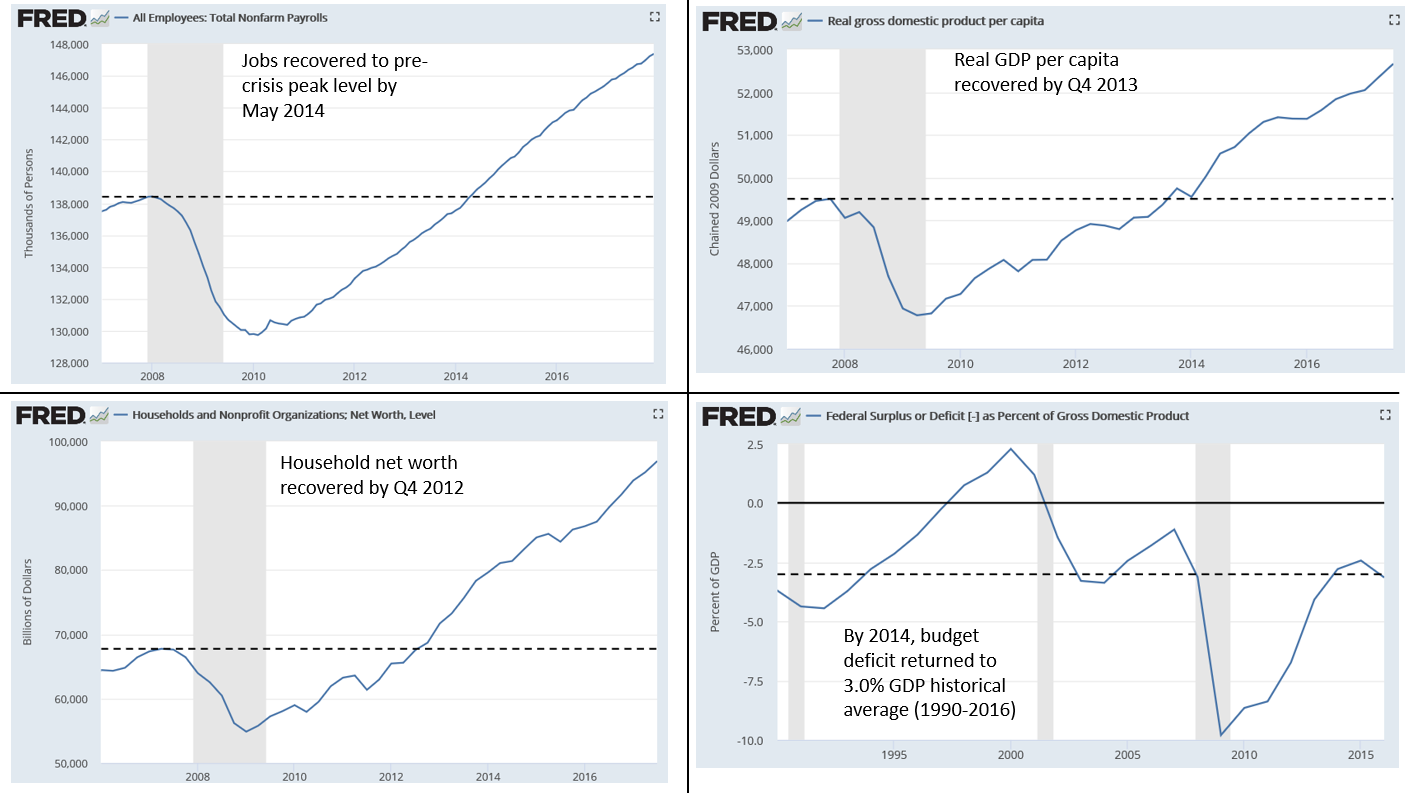
Several major U.S. economic variables had recovered from the 2007–2009 Subprime mortgage crisis and Great Recession by the 2013–2014 time period.

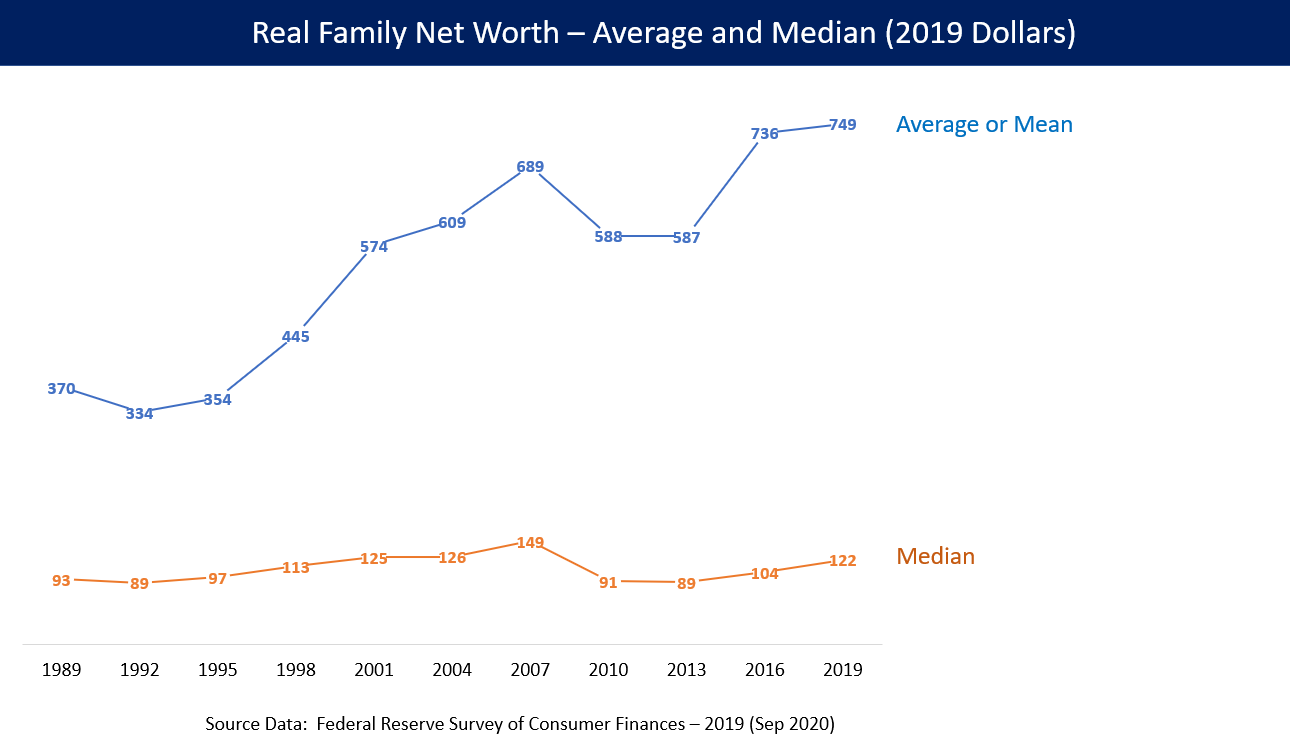
U.S. median family net worth peaked in 2007, declined due to the Great Recession until 2013, and only partially recovered by 2016.

The recession officially ended in the second quarter of 2009, but the nation's economy continued to be described as in an "economic malaise" during the second quarter of 2011. Some economists described the post-recession years as the weakest recovery since the Great Depression and World War II. The weak economic recovery has led many to call it a "Zombie Economy", so-called because it is neither dead nor alive. Household incomes, as of August 2012, had fallen more since the end of the recession, than during the 18-month recession, falling an additional 4.8% since the end of the recession, totally to 7.2% since the December 2007 level. Additionally as of September 2012, the long-term unemployment was the highest it had been since World War II, and the unemployment rate peaked several months after the end of the recession (10.1% in October 2009) and was above 8% until September 2012 (7.8%). The Federal Reserve kept interest rates at a historically low 0.25% from December 2008 until December 2015, when it began to raise them again.

However, the Great Recession was different in kind from all the recessions since the Great Depression, as it also involved a banking crisis and the de-leveraging (debt reduction) of highly indebted households. Research indicates recovery from financial crises can be protracted, with lengthy periods of high unemployment and substandard economic growth. Economist Carmen Reinhart stated in August 2011: "Debt de-leveraging [reduction] takes about seven years ... And in the decade following severe financial crises, you tend to grow by 1 to 1.5 percentage points less than in the decade before, because the decade before was fueled by a boom in private borrowing, and not all of that growth was real. The unemployment figures in advanced economies after falls are also very dark. Unemployment remains anchored about five percentage points above what it was in the decade before."

Then-Fed Chair Ben Bernanke explained during November 2012 several of the economic headwinds that slowed the recovery:

- The housing sector did not rebound, as was the case in prior recession recoveries, as the sector was severely damaged during the crisis. Millions of foreclosures had created a large surplus of properties and consumers were paying down their debts rather than purchasing homes.
- Credit for borrowing and spending by individuals (or investing by corporations) was not readily available as banks paid down their debts.
- Restrained government spending following initial stimulus efforts (i.e., austerity) was not sufficient to offset private sector weaknesses.

For example, U.S. federal spending rose from 19.1% GDP in fiscal year (FY) 2007 to 24.4% GDP in FY2009 (the last year budgeted by President Bush) before falling towards to 20.4% GDP in 2014, closer to the historical average. In dollar terms, federal spending was actually higher in 2009 than in 2014, despite a historical trend of a roughly 5% annual increase. This reduced real GDP growth by approximately 0.5% per quarter on average between Q3 2010 and Q2 2014. Both households and government practicing austerity at the same time was a recipe for a slow recovery.

Several key economic variables (e.g., Job level, real GDP per capita, household net worth, and the federal budget deficit) hit their low point (trough) in 2009 or 2010, after which they began to turn upward, recovering to pre-recession (2007) levels between late 2012 and May 2014 (close to Reinhart's prediction), which marked the recovery of all jobs lost during the recession. Real median household income fell to a trough of $53,331 in 2012, but recovered to an all-time high of $59,039 by 2016. However, the gains during the recovery were very unevenly distributed. Economist Emmanuel Saez wrote in June 2016 that the top 1% of families captured 52% of the total real income (GDP) growth per family from 2009–2015. The gains were more evenly distributed after the tax increases in 2013 on higher-income earners.

President Obama declared the bailout measures started under the Bush administration and continued during his administration as completed and mostly profitable as of December 2014. As of January 2018, bailout funds had been fully recovered by the government, when interest on loans is taken into consideration. A total of $626B was invested, loaned, or granted due to various bailout measures, while $390B had been returned to the Treasury. The Treasury had earned another $323B in interest on bailout loans, resulting in an $87B profit.

== See also ==
- 2008 financial crisis
- 2010 United States foreclosure crisis
- American Casino, documentary film about the crisis
- American International Group
- Bear Stearns
- Collateralized debt obligation#Subprime mortgage boom
- Community Reinvestment Act
- Diamond–Dybvig model
- Fair value accounting and the subprime mortgage crisis
- Financial Crisis Inquiry Commission
- Great Recession
- Inside Job, documentary film about the crisis
- Late 2000s recession
- List of entities involved in 2007–2008 financial crises
- List of largest U.S. bank failures (many were caused or related to this crisis)
- Long-Term Capital Management
- Marquette Nat. Bank of Minneapolis v. First of Omaha Service Corp.
- Mortgage-backed security
- National City acquisition by PNC, the merger of PNC Financial Services and National City Corp. after National City became a victim of the subprime crisis.
- Nationalisation of Northern Rock
- Ownership society
- Panic of 1837
- Panic of 1907
- Predatory lending
- Real estate bubble
- Savings and loan crisis of the late 1980s.
- Securitization
- Shadow banking system
- Subprime mortgage crisis solutions debate
- Toxic security
- Troubled Assets Relief Program
- United States housing bubble
- White collar crime

=== Other housing bubbles ===
- Irish property bubble
- Japanese asset price bubble
- Spanish property bubble
- Swedish banking rescue
- United Kingdom housing bubble
