= Embassy of Australia, Washington, D.C. =

Diplomatic mission of Australia in the United States

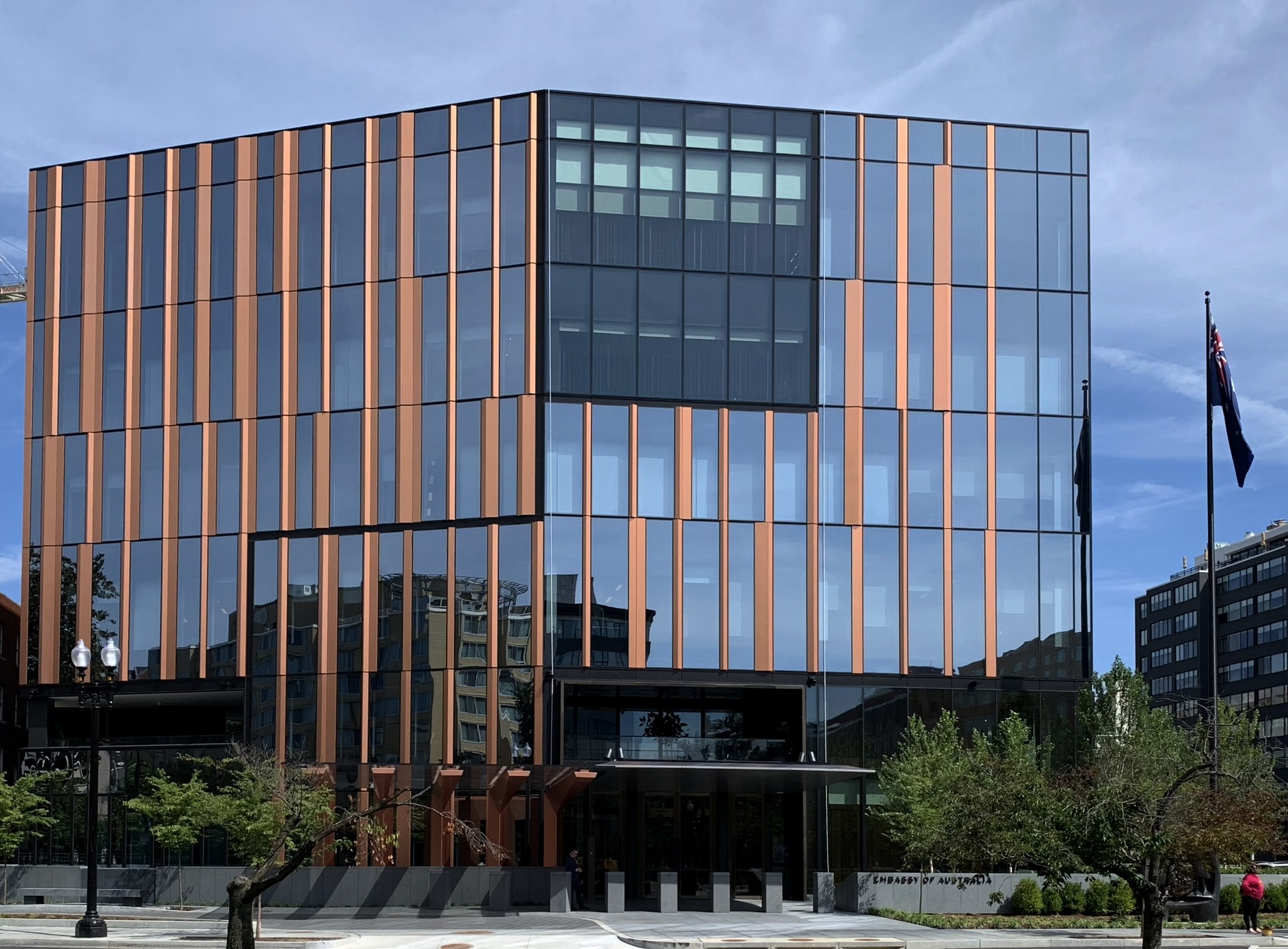
- Embassy of Australia in 2023
- Address: 1601 Massachusetts Ave. NW, Washington D.C. 20036
- Ambassador: Greg Moriarty
- Website: http://usa.embassy.gov.au/

The Embassy of Australia in Washington, D.C. is the diplomatic mission of the Commonwealth of Australia to the United States. The chancery is located at 1601 Massachusetts Avenue NW on Scott Circle, at the beginning of Embassy Row. The current ambassador is former Secretary of the Department of Defence Greg Moriarty and the Deputy Head of Mission is Jason Robertson. The embassy employs more than 250 people.

Australia and the US have had strong diplomatic relations for over a century. For many years Australia was represented in Washington, D.C. by trade ministers. The two countries formed official bilateral relations in 1940. The diplomatic mission in Washington D.C., Australia's second-oldest one overseas, included a legation that opened in 1940. The second location for the legation was a large house called White Oaks, located in Woodley Park, and has served as the ambassadorial residence since that time.

In 1946, the US upgraded both legations of Australia and the US from legations to embassies, with Robert Butler serving as the first Australian ambassador to the US. For approximately two decades, the embassy was located in the Wilkins House, currently the Embassy of Peru. After running out of office space, embassy officials announced plans to build a new embassy one block east of their current location. The new marble-clad modernist embassy made of glass, steel, and concrete, opened in 1969.

By the 2010s, the embassy needed serious repairs. The Australian government chose to demolish the embassy and build a new 213,600-square-foot (19,844 sq m) replacement with a projected price tag of A$236.9 million (US$154.7 million). After several years of planning and bureaucratic approvals, the new embassy opened in August 2023 at a total cost of $A337 million. It was designed by Bates Smart and Washington, D.C. local firm KCCT. The exterior is clad in copper alloy panels, and a large atrium is in the center of the building to provide natural lighting.

== Location ==
The embassy is located at 1601 Massachusetts Avenue NW on the northwest corner of Scott Circle and a few blocks north of the White House. The traffic circle is where 16th Street NW, M Street NW, Massachusetts Avenue NW, and Rhode Island Avenue NW converge. The property is in Square 181 on Lot 141. Australia's embassy is often called the starting point of Embassy Row, a stretch of Massachusetts Avenue NW and nearby streets where the majority of the embassies and other diplomatic offices are located, often in palatial former residences. The end of Embassy Row is approximately at Observatory Circle, where the US vice president resides at Number One Observatory Circle. In addition to the embassy in Washington, D.C., there are Australian consulates in Chicago, Honolulu, Houston, Los Angeles, New York City, and San Francisco.

== History ==
=== Early diplomatic relations ===
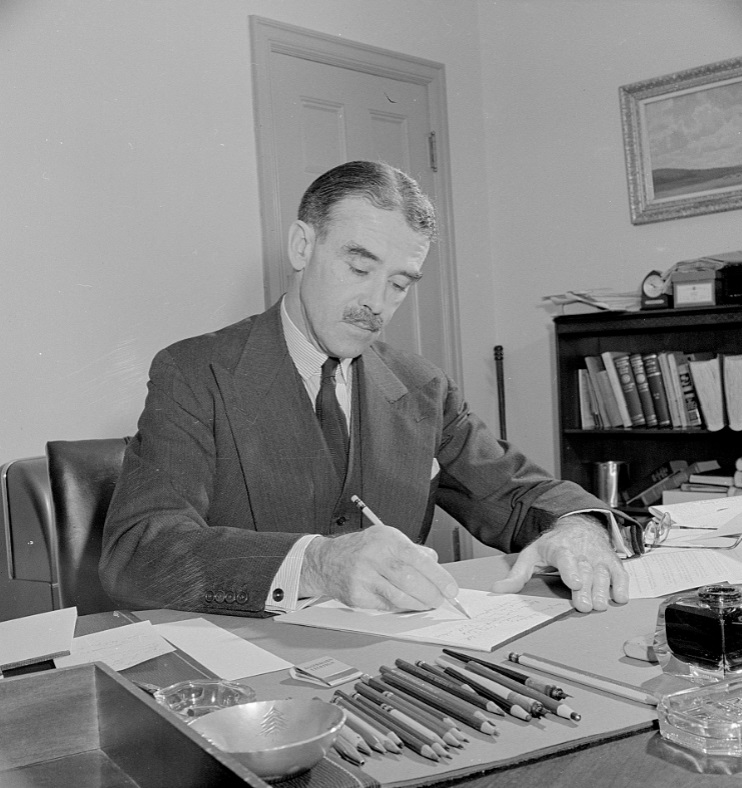
Richard Gardiner Casey was the first envoy extraordinary and minister plenipotentiary to the US.

Although Australia was still a crown colony of the United Kingdom in the late 19th century, there was already foreign representation to the United States. Although these were not official legations, they were referred to as legations in news reports in 1876 and 1890. From 1918 to 1930, after the Great Depression began, the Federation was represented to the US by trade ministers. Representation by trade ministers resumed in 1938 and continued until 1940.

On January 8, 1940, the Australian and American governments established official diplomatic relations. The United States is home to Australia's second-oldest overseas diplomatic mission. The first legation was temporarily located in a nine-room house at 1811 24th Street NW in Sheridan-Kalorama. By March of that year, the legation moved into White Oaks, a large house at 3120 Cleveland Avenue NW (also known as 3117 Woodland Drive NW) in Woodley Park that has served as the ambassadorial residence since that time. When the legation first opened, there were only five staff members. In March of that year, Richard Gardiner Casey was appointed the first Envoy Extraordinary and Minister Plenipotentiary to the US. A few months later in July, Clarence E. Gauss was appointed the first Envoy Extraordinary and Minister Plenipotentiary to Australia. In 1941, Prime Minister Robert Menzies became the first Australian prime minister to visit the new legation. His visit to Washington, D.C. was a time to speak with government officials, including President Franklin D. Roosevelt, about World War II.

=== Original 1700 Massachusetts Avenue NW embassy ===
On January 9, 1946, White House officials announced the upgrading of both legations to embassy status. Robert Butler served as the first American ambassador to Australia and Norman Makin served as the first Australian ambassador to the US. Beginning in 1947, the embassy operated out of the Wilkins House, which is currently the Embassy of Peru and was designed by Jules Henri de Sibour. In 1973 the building was sold to the Peruvian government. In 1951, the two countries joined New Zealand to form a security agreement called ANZUS, a treaty that is still in force between Australia and the US.

=== Move to 1601 Massachusetts Avenue NW ===
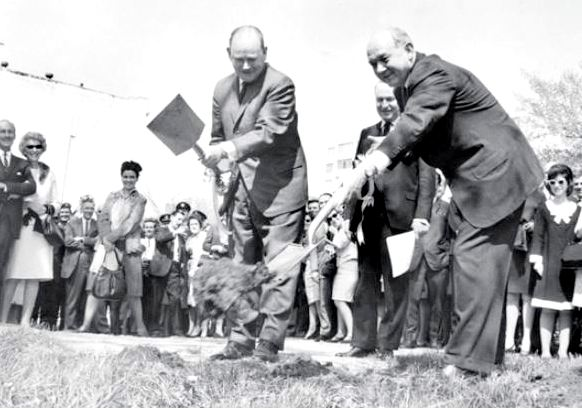
Groundbreaking for the previous Australian embassy in 1967

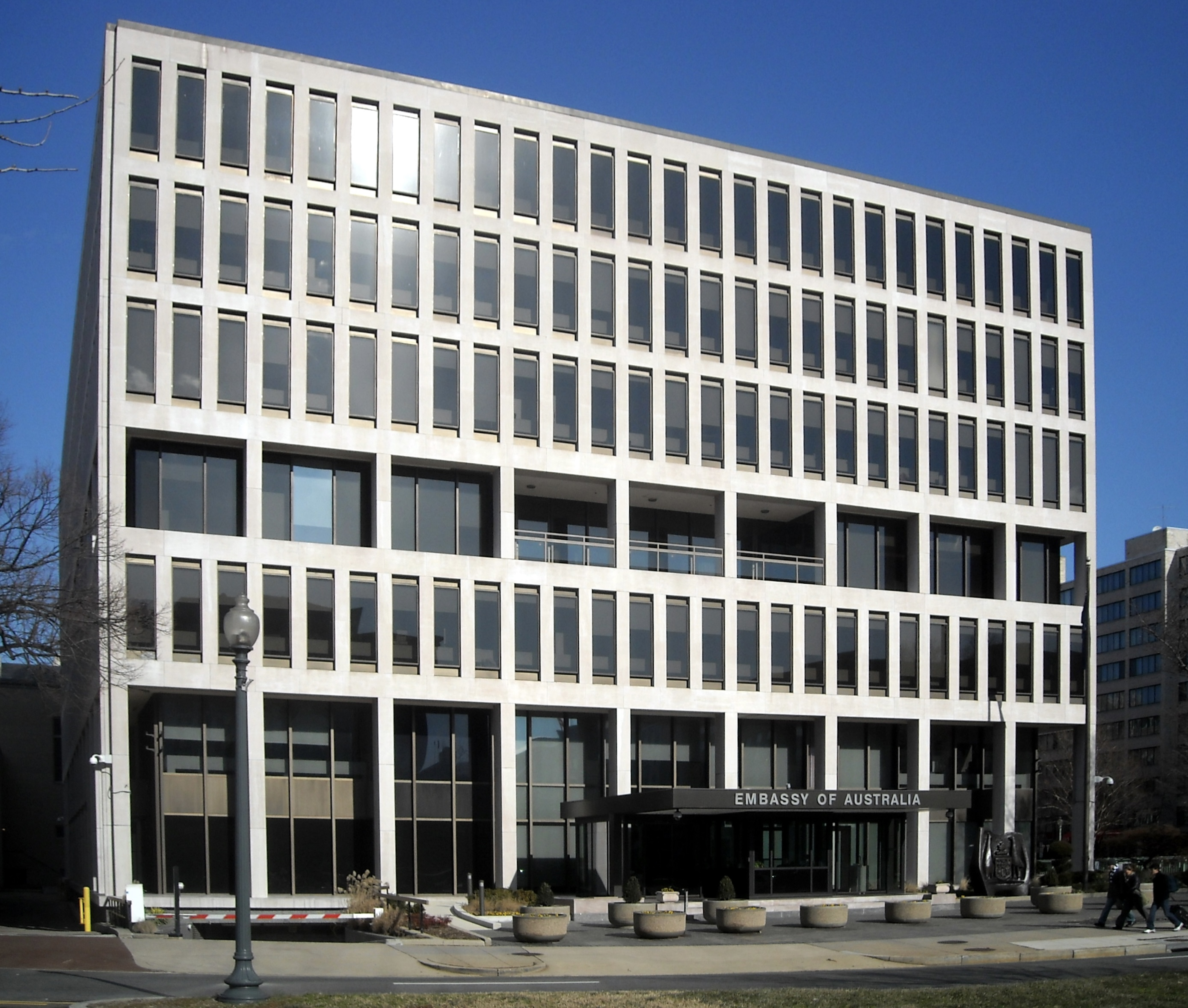
The former embassy photographed in 2009

By the 1960s, the embassy needed more office space. In 1965, the Australian government purchased a lot on Scott Circle for A£523,500, with the total project expected to cost A£3.1 million. The land purchased had long been the site of the Windom House, a large residence built in 1881 for Secretary of the Treasury William Windom with later additions designed by James G. Hill. In addition to Windom, notable occupants of the house included Senator James G. Blaine, publisher Charles Allen Munn, Representative Richard S. Aldrich, the Peruvian Embassy, and the last occupant, the Catholic Daughters of the Americas. The house was demolished after Australian officials purchased the land.

In 1967, a groundbreaking ceremony took place with Australia's Minister for External Affairs Paul Hasluck and US Secretary of State Dean Rusk in attendance. The seven-story modernist building was designed by Bates, Smart and McCutcheon. The off-white marble building was completed in 1969 and opened to the public on June 20th of that year. An outdoor sculpture called Australian Seal, by artist Thomas Bass, was installed outside the new building which depicts an artistic rendition of the Australian coat of arms. The interior featured an eclectic design, including swivel chairs resting on blue kangaroo rugs. Artwork by Sidney Nolan, Albert Tucker, and John Perceval, along with sculptures by Arthur Boyd and Inge King, were featured throughout the embassy.

For decades the embassy has hosted social, educational, and artistic events. Previous events and artists hosted by embassy officials include: an eight-week course on the history of Australia; an exhibit of John Coburn's tapestries; an exhibit featuring Ben Shearer's watercolor paintings of the Outback; drawings of World War II sailors and soldiers by Louis Kahan; co-hosting an exhibit with the National Museum of Women in the Arts featuring art by Aboriginal Australian women; a ceramic installation by Gwyn Hanssen Pigott; artworks by Aboriginal members of the Papunya, Balgo, and Yuendumu communities; a painting exhibit by Aboriginal artist Loongkoonan; and renaming the embassy's art gallery after academic and Governor-General of Australia Quentin Bryce. Australian Prime Minister John Howard recalls sheltering in a bunker beneath the embassy when he was visiting Washington, D.C. during the September 11, 2001 attacks.

Behind the embassy stood a memorial to the victims of the Bakers Creek air crash, in which 40 American World War II soldiers died in Australia in 1943. The memorial was unveiled at the World War II Memorial in June 2006 and later moved to the embassy until it could be placed at an American cemetery. Two US senators brought the issue to a vote in the Senate in 2007. Because embassies are considered foreign soil, the memorial was moved in 2009 to Arlington National Cemetery. A rededication ceremony took place on June 14, 2009, on the 66th anniversary of the crash.

=== 2023 demolition and replacement ===
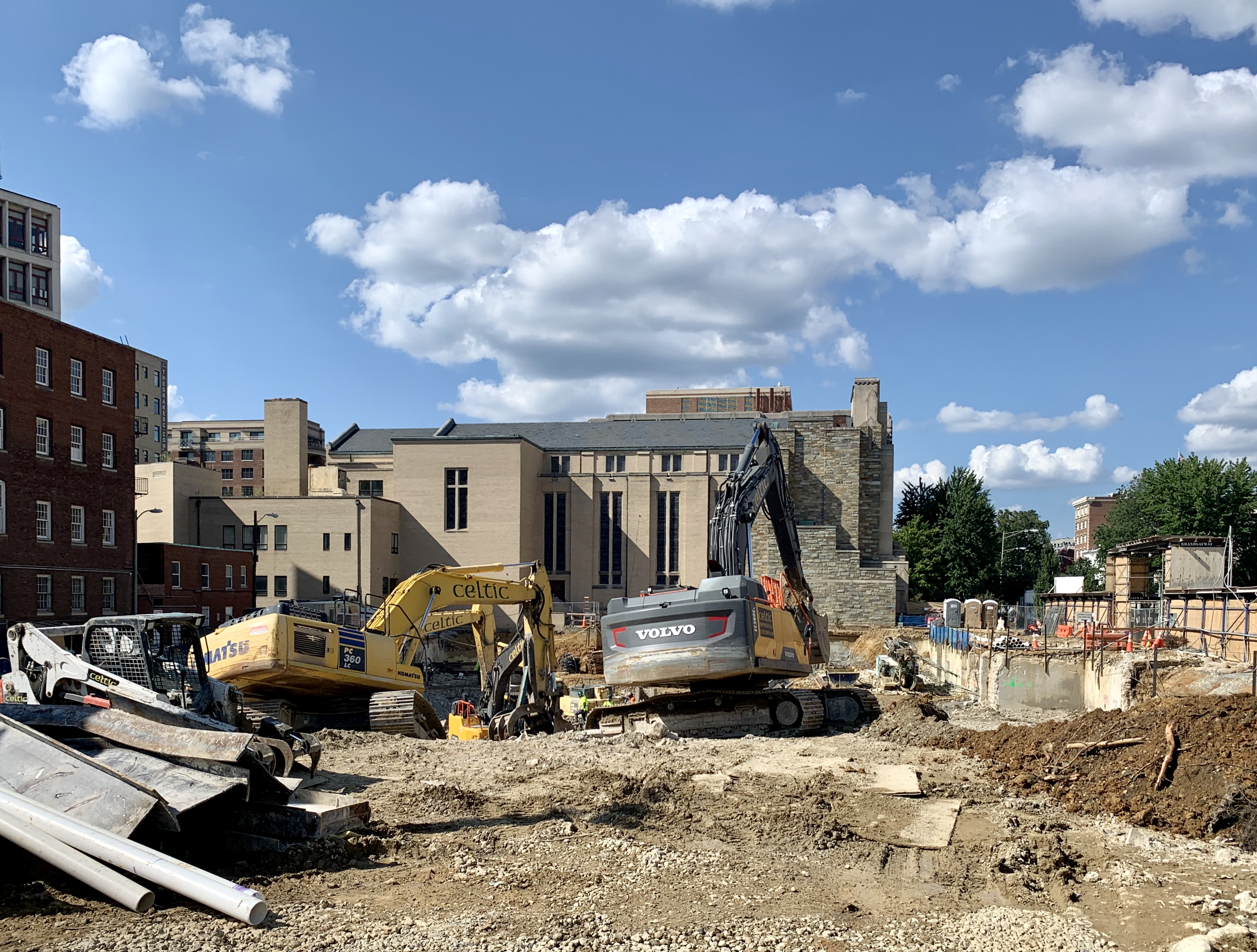
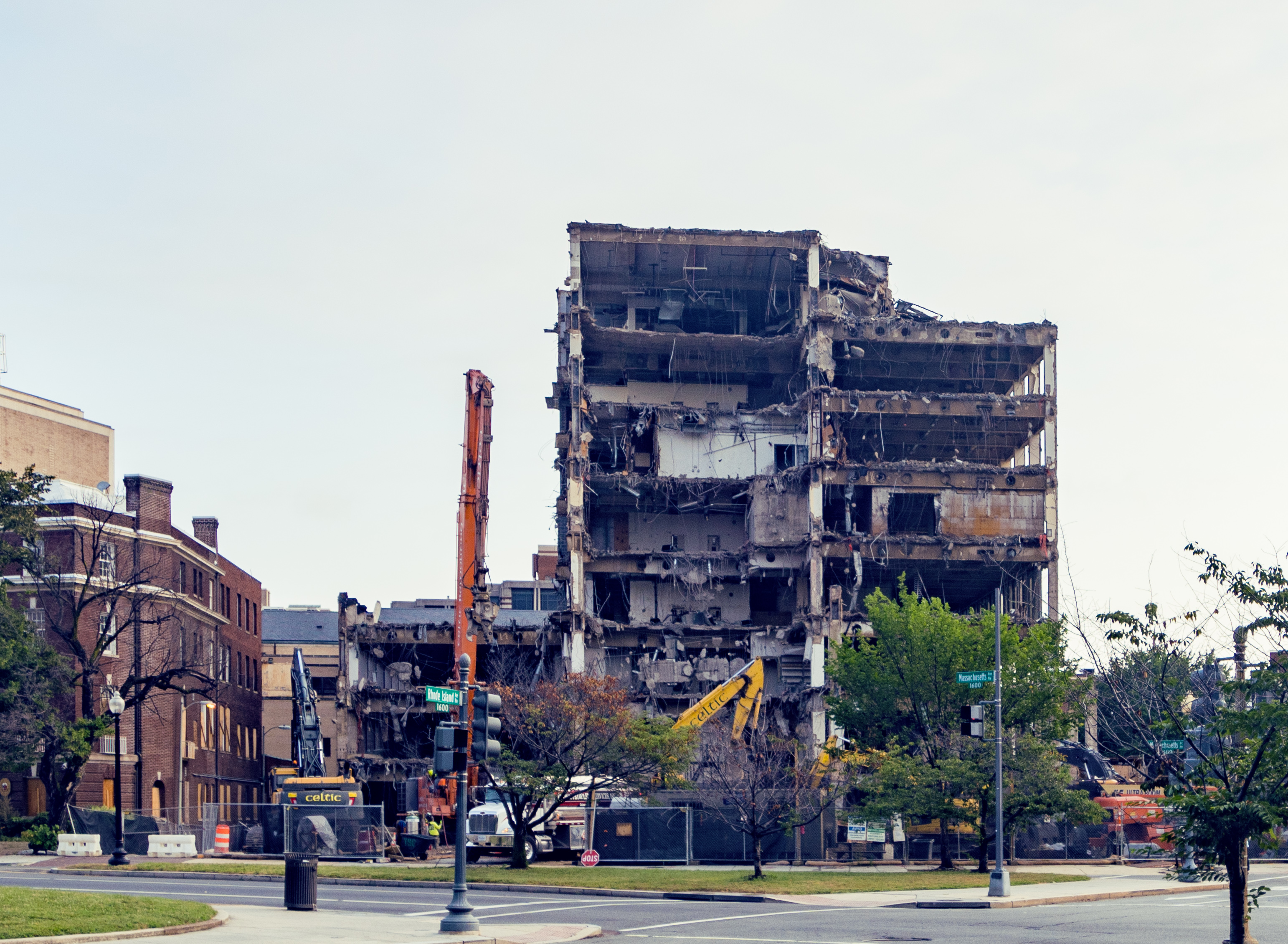
Excavation and demolition of the old embassy in 2020

By 2014, the embassy's condition was deteriorating. Scaffolding and cladding were erected to prevent parts of the façade dislodging from the building. At this time the Australian government was considering options to repair it. In 2014, a decision was made to demolish the embassy and replace it with a new building at a cost of $A236.9 million. The land, which had a value of A$57 million, was to be kept and a new building was planned for the site. The final approval took place in 2017 to build the new embassy. Bates Smart and Washington, D.C.–based architectural firm KCCT were chosen to design the new facility on November 15, 2016.

The design of the new 213,600-square-foot (19,844 sq m) embassy was unveiled in late 2016, with a selection of planned interior and exterior photos. In regard to the façade, facing one of the city's many traffic circles, Bates studio director Tim Leslie said it "is quite significant for Canberra...you are approaching this building from a multitude of different angles". The design was intended to resemble government buildings on the south side and residential buildings on the north side. Leslie said "The building appears more solid as you are approaching from the north, towards the White House. Coming from the other way...it has a much more civic nature: open and glass."

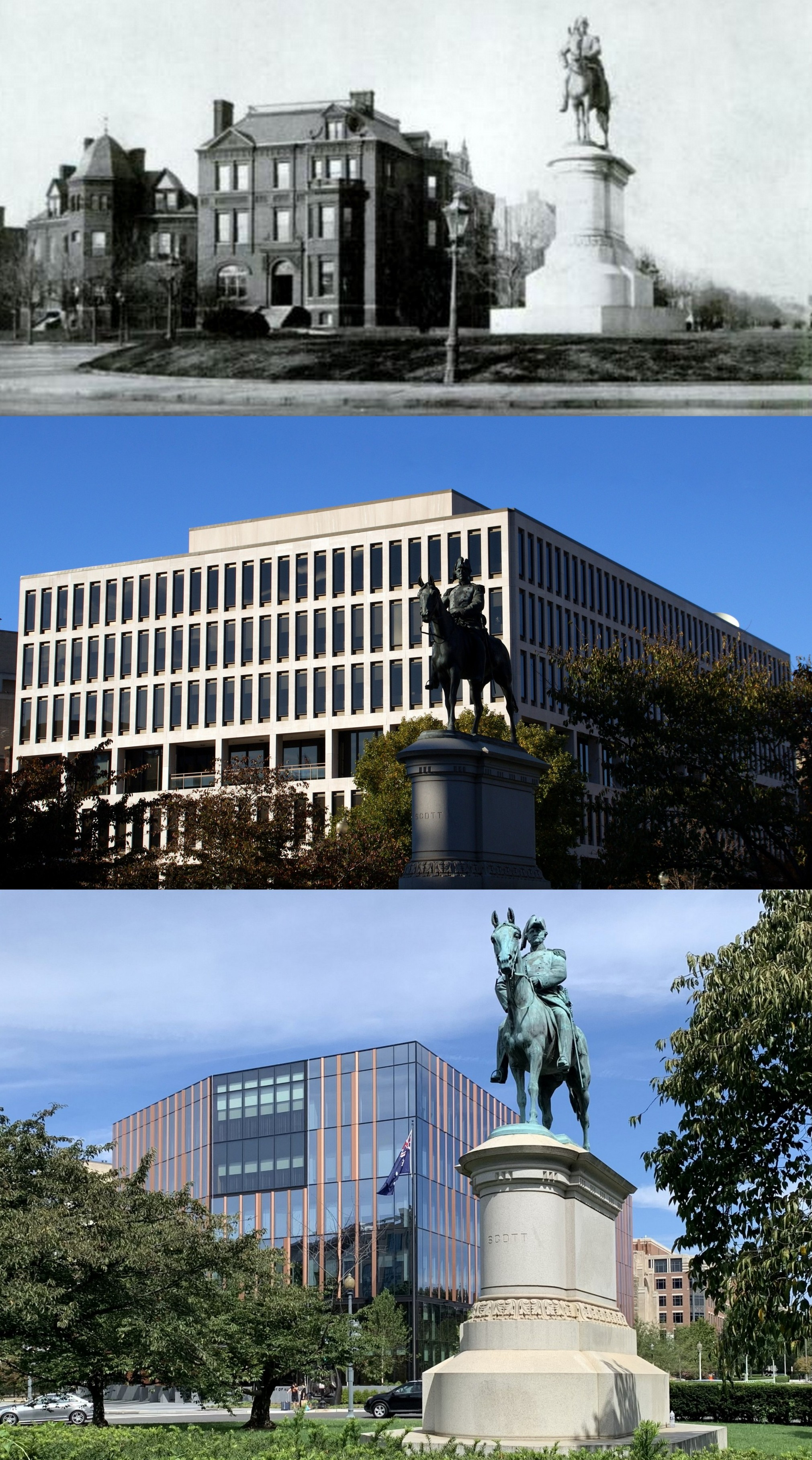
The northwest corner of Scott Circle in 1888, 2008, and 2023

In June 2017, embassy officials began the process of seeking approval from the local Office of Zoning to build the new facility. An application fee of $88,500 was paid later that month. Along with the money sent, embassy officials included a letter of approval from the US State Department, a copy of the surveyor's plat, and other documents. Like all structures facing 16th Street NW from H Street NW to Florida Avenue, the site is included in the Sixteenth Street Historic District. Due to the previous embassy's date of construction and design, it was not included as a contributing property to the historic district. The same applies to the new embassy, so approval from the Historic Preservation Review Board was unnecessary.

In 2019, embassy staff, numbering over 250 people, were moved to a temporary office space owned by the National Geographic Society at 1145 17th Street NW. Beginning in October 2019, it took around one year for the old embassy to be demolished and to excavate the lot. Work by Clark Construction began in November 2020. Due to cost overruns associated with the COVID-19 pandemic, supply chain issues, and the Australian dollar's weakness to the United States dollar, the estimated cost to build the new embassy was $A337 million ($215 million US). The embassy topped out in August 2021 and opened on August 14, 2023. Until March 2026, the Head of Mission was Kevin Rudd, the 26th prime minister of Australia, who was appointed in 2023. From 2021 until August of 2024 the deputy head of mission was Paul Myler.

==== 2023 embassy design ====
Describing his design for the new embassy, Bates said, "The current embassy was designed in an era which was all about reflecting Washington and the normal conservative standards of the 1960s. It deferred to the language of Washington. The new embassy defers to the Australian character and synthesises that with the local precinct character". According to Wish's Luke Slattery, Bates designer Kristen Whittle "felt strongly that this time the firm needed to build something uniquely Australian, and not just lard it with Australiana". One difference between the old embassy and new one is the original's sterile modernism, while the new embassy has a more unique and contemporary design.

Bates' design was inspired by the "red centre, canopies of grey-green eucalyptus" and the exterior resembling salt pans in the Australian desert. The exterior is made of copper alloy panels which John Kelly of The Washington Post described as "thin, taut glass exterior walls that are hung like curtains. This allows architects to create as much floor space as possible — thick walls eat up space — and in a height-restricted city like D.C., space is at a premium". The copper panels have been treated to prevent patina. There is a street running north–south through the embassy property and a restaurant with a bar on the first floor. There is a large central atrium to create the feeling of open space with natural light. There are 31 bicycle parking bays and 91 parking spaces, less than normally required for local buildings because of the nearby Dupont Circle Metro station. There is an abundance of Australian art throughout the embassy.

== See also ==
- Australia–United States relations
- Embassy of the United States, Canberra
- List of ambassadors of Australia to the United States
- List of consuls-general of Australia in New York
- List of ambassadors of the United States to Australia
- List of diplomatic missions in the United States
- List of diplomatic missions in Washington, D.C.
- List of diplomatic missions of Australia
