= Vandenberg resolution =

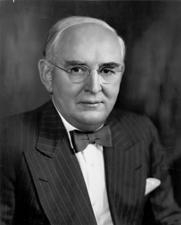

The Vandenberg Resolution (S.Res. 239) was passed in June 1948 and was proposed by and named after US Senator Arthur Vandenberg.

Negotiations over the nature and degree of commitment by the United States to defend its North Atlantic allies were complicated by the conflicting desire of the allies for an iron-clad assurance of immediate US intervention in case of a Soviet attack and the insistence for the US Senate that its constitutional prerogatives to be preserved, especially the power to commit the US to war. US State Department officials, after assuming a common position of support for the idea of a treaty, patiently wove together a text that balanced the concerns of its European allies, the Senate, and the US military. Domestic US politics, particularly those arising from the presidential election of 1948, played an important role in the international and congressional negotiations.

In keeping with practices worked out during the congressional debate over the Marshall Plan, discussions between administration and Republican leaders over collective security arrangements in Europe were held between April and June 1948. The talks reflected the likelihood of a Republican (GOP) presidential victory in the November elections. Republican Senator Arthur H. Vandenberg, Chairman of the Senate Foreign Relations Committee and President pro tempore of the Senate, was a leading candidate for the Republican presidential nomination before he dropped out of the contest. In friendly and candid talks with Secretary of State George Marshall and Under-Secretary Robert A. Lovett, Vandenberg embraced the concept of a North Atlantic alliance and agreed to support it in the Senate only if substantive negotiations were delayed until after the elections, and the UN Charter was more clearly affirmed and invoked in the prospective treaty.

The role of personal relations in foreign policy was demonstrated by Lovett's informal discussions with Vandenberg, who was now a convinced internationalist and wanted to be helpful but was mindful of political realities, which he sought to impress on the Lovett and the Truman administration.

In an April 11 meeting, Lovett tactfully probed Vandenberg's thinking on a number of key issues, including the type of aid Congress would approve; the form of a pact, particularly the willingness of the Senate to approve a slightly modified version of the Rio Treaty with regard to Europe; the role of the United Nations in collective security arrangements; and the legislative preparation needed for eventual conclusion of a long-term European security agreement. A week later, Vandenberg and Lovett discussed the wording of a resolution that would provide the legislative groundwork for a long-term pact.

On May 11, Vandenberg presented a resolution that he had drafted with Lovett to the Senate Foreign Relations Committee, which approved it. On June 11 Vandenberg introduced and the Senate passed 82-13 a resolution advising the President to seek the security of the US and the rest of the Free World by support of mutual defense arrangements that operated within the UN Charter but outside the UN Security Council since the Soviet veto would otherwise thwart collective defense arrangements.

Paragraph 3 of the resolution referred to issues of military assistance or alliance by encouraging "association by the United States, by constitutional process, with such regional and other collective arrangements as are based on continuous and effective self-help and mutual aid, and as effects its national security."

The Vandenberg Resolution was the landmark action that opened the way to the negotiation of the North Atlantic Treaty. It is clear that the concept of such an alliance first arose during the Pentagon Talks in Washington in March, but US action would have been stymied without the Senate resolution endorsing an internationalist role for the country.

As chairman of the Senate Foreign Relations Committee, Vandenberg asserted that "politics stops at the water's edge" and cooperated with the Truman administration in forging bipartisan support. Francis O. Wilcox, the first chief of staff of the Foreign Relations Committee, recalled that Vandenberg's Senate career stood as a monument to bipartisanship in American foreign policy: "his legacy continues."

Recently, "the Senate bestowed a unique honor on the Michigan senator," voting to add his portrait to a "very select collection" in the United States Senate Reception Room.

A new book about Vandenberg's bipartisan relationship with the Truman administration reinforced the importance of their cooperation.
