= Frank Lockhart =

Frank Lockhart may refer to:

- Frank Lockhart (diplomat) (1881–1949), American diplomat
- Frank Lockhart (racing driver) (1903–1928), American racing driver
