= William J. Sebald =

American diplomat (1901–1980)

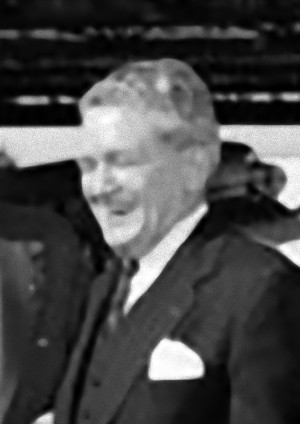
- Sebald in June 1957.

United States Ambassador to Japan
- In office 1947–1952
- President: Harry S. Truman
- Preceded by: Joseph Grew
- Succeeded by: Robert D. Murphy

United States Ambassador to Burma
- In office April 25, 1952 – July 15, 1954
- President: Harry S. Truman; Dwight D. Eisenhower
- Preceded by: David McK. Key
- Succeeded by: Joseph C. Satterthwaite

8th United States Ambassador to Australia
- In office March 14, 1957 – October 31, 1961
- President: Dwight D. Eisenhower; John F. Kennedy
- Preceded by: Douglas M. Moffat
- Succeeded by: William C. Battle

Personal details
- Born: November 5, 1901 Baltimore, Maryland, U.S.
- Died: August 10, 1980 (aged 78) Naples, Florida, U.S.
- Spouse: Edith Frances deBecker (m. 1927)
- Education: U.S. Naval Academy; University of Maryland (JD)
- Profession: Lawyer, Diplomat

William Joseph Sebald (November 5, 1901 – August 10, 1980) was an American diplomat who served as United States Ambassador to Burma from April 1952 to July 1954, and to Australia from 1957 to 1961.

== Education and career ==
Sebald graduated from the U.S. Naval Academy in 1922. Sebald moved to Kobe, Japan in 1925 as part of an officer's language program. Sebald resigned from the Navy in 1930.

In 1933, Sebald earned his juris doctor degree specializing in international law from the University of Maryland. He moved back to Japan and practiced law at his father-in-laws firm from 1933 to 1939. Sebald also received an honorary doctor of laws degree from the University of Maryland for his study and work in Japanese law in 1949.

Sebald served during World War II with the Office of Naval Intelligence (ONI) back in the United States starting in 1939. Then he was on the staff of Admiral Ernest King. He was a political adviser to General Douglas MacArthur, with ambassador rank.

Sebald was U.S. Ambassador to Burma (1952–1954), Deputy Assistant Secretary of State for East Asian and Pacific Affairs (1954–1956), and Ambassador to Australia (1957–1961).

Sebald retired in 1961.

== Personal life and death ==
Sebald met his wife Edith France deBecker in Kobe, Japan. They were married in 1927. He died from emphysema in Naples, Florida, on August 10, 1980, at the age of 78.

== Works ==
- With MacArthur in Japan: A Personal History of the Occupation, Norton, 1965, ISBN 9780393336764

Diplomatic posts
Preceded by Joseph Grew	U.S. Ambassador to Japan ad interim 1947–1952	Succeeded by Robert D. Murphy
Preceded by David McK. Key	U.S. Ambassador to Burma; 1952–1954	Succeeded by Joseph C. Satterthwaite
Preceded by Douglas M. Moffat	U.S. Ambassador to Australia; 1957–1961	Succeeded by William C. Battle
