= James Hargrove =

James Hargrove may refer to:

- Jim Hargrove (born 1953), member of the Washington State Senate
- James W. Hargrove (1922–2004), American businessman, United States Postal Service executive and US Ambassador
- Jim Hargrove (American football) (1945–2017), American football linebacker
- Jimmy Hargrove (born 1957), American football running back
