= Arthur Vandenberg =

U.S. Senator from Michigan (1884-1951)

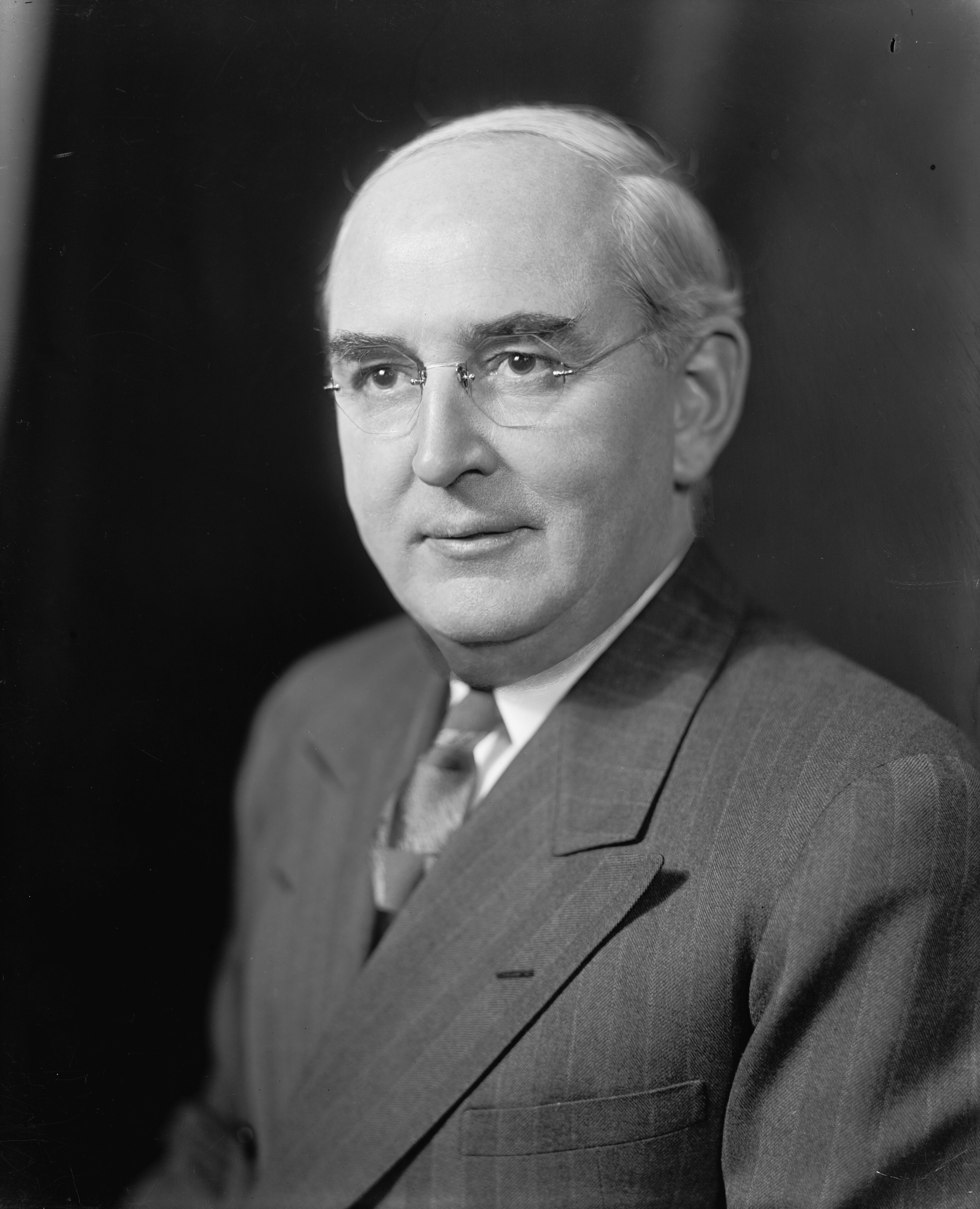
- Vandenburg, 1905–1945

President pro tempore of the United States Senate
- In office January 3, 1947 – January 3, 1949
- Preceded by: Kenneth McKellar
- Succeeded by: Kenneth McKellar

Chairman of the Senate Foreign Relations Committee
- In office January 3, 1947 – January 3, 1949
- Preceded by: Tom Connally
- Succeeded by: Tom Connally

Chairman of the Senate Republican Conference
- In office January 3, 1945 – January 3, 1947
- Leader: Wallace H. White Jr.
- Vice Chair: Harold Hitz Burton; John Chandler Gurney; Milton Young
- Preceded by: Charles L. McNary
- Succeeded by: Eugene D. Millikin

United States Senator from Michigan
- In office March 31, 1928 – April 18, 1951
- Preceded by: Woodbridge N. Ferris
- Succeeded by: Blair Moody

Personal details
- Born: Arthur Hendrick Vandenberg; March 22, 1884 Grand Rapids, Michigan, U.S.
- Died: April 18, 1951 (aged 67) Grand Rapids, Michigan, U.S.
- Resting place: Oak Hill Cemetery, Grand Rapids, Michigan
- Party: Republican
- Spouses: Elizabeth Watson (m. 1906; died 1917) Hazel Harper Whitaker (m. 1918; died 1950)
- Children: 3, including Arthur Jr.
- Education: University of Michigan
- Profession: Politician; Newspaper editor and publisher

Arthur Hendrick Vandenberg Sr. (March 22, 1884 – April 18, 1951) was an American politician who served as a United States senator from Michigan from 1928 to 1951. A member of the Republican Party, he participated in the creation of the United Nations. He is best known for leading the Republican Party from a foreign policy of isolationism to one of internationalism, and supporting the Cold War, the Truman Doctrine, the Marshall Plan, and NATO. He served as president pro tempore of the United States Senate from 1947 to 1949.

Born and raised in Grand Rapids, Michigan, in a family of Dutch Americans, Vandenberg began his career as a newspaper editor and publisher. In 1928, Republican governor Fred W. Green appointed Vandenberg to the U.S. Senate to fill the vacancy that arose after the death of Woodbridge N. Ferris. Vandenberg won election to a full term later that year and remained in the Senate until his death in 1951. He supported the early New Deal programs but came to oppose most of President Franklin D. Roosevelt's domestic policies. During the late 1930s, Vandenberg also opposed the United States' becoming involved in World War II and urged Roosevelt to reach an accommodation with Japan.

Vandenberg abandoned his isolationism after the Japanese attack on Pearl Harbor. He became chairman of the Senate Foreign Relations Committee in 1947 and supported Democratic president Harry Truman's Cold War policies, asserting that "politics stops at the water's edge." Vandenberg also served as the chairman of the Republican Senate Conference from 1945 to 1947 and as the president pro tempore of the Senate from 1947 to 1949. He unsuccessfully sought the Republican nomination for president in 1940 and 1948.

== Early life and family ==
Vandenberg was born and raised in Grand Rapids, Michigan, the son of Alpha (née Hendrick) and Aaron Vandenberg, of mostly Dutch heritage. Vandenberg attended the public schools of Grand Rapids and graduated from Grand Rapids Central High School in June 1900 ranked first in his class. He then studied law at the University of Michigan (1900–1901), where he was a member of the Delta Upsilon fraternity. After a brief stint working in New York at Collier's Weekly magazine, he returned home in 1906 to marry his childhood sweetheart, Elizabeth Watson. They had three children. She died in 1917, and in 1918 Vandenberg married Hazel Whitaker. They had no children.

From 1906 to 1928, he worked as a newspaper editor and publisher at the Grand Rapids Herald. It was owned by William Alden Smith, who served as a Republican in the U.S. Senate from 1907 to 1919. As publisher, Vandenberg made the paper highly profitable. He wrote most of the editorials, many of which called for more Progressivism in the spirit of his hero Theodore Roosevelt. He supported incumbent President William Howard Taft over Roosevelt in the 1912 election. In 1915 Vandenberg coined the term "loon ship" for Henry Ford's Peace Ship in reaction to Ford's more outlandish ideas.

A talented public speaker, during political campaigns Vandenberg often gave speeches on behalf of Republican candidates. He also attended numerous local, county and state Republican conventions as a delegate, and gave several convention keynote addresses. His work on behalf of the party gave Vandenberg a high public profile, and he was frequently mentioned as a candidate for governor or other offices.

As a widower with three small children, Vandenberg was ineligible for active military service during World War I. To contribute to the war effort, Vandenberg gave speeches at hundreds of Liberty bond rallies in Michigan and Ohio, in which he urged listeners to demonstrate their patriotism by helping finance U.S. military preparedness and combat. In addition, he joined the Michigan State Troops, the volunteer organization that performed many of the National Guard's duties after the Guard was federalized. Appointed a first lieutenant, Vandenberg commanded a company in Grand Rapids until the end of the war. After the war, Vandenberg aided in founding and organizing the Michigan branch of the American Legion.

Vandenberg gained national attention for his 1921 biography The Greatest American: Alexander Hamilton. He followed this in 1923 with If Hamilton Were Here Today: American Fundamentals Applied to Modern Problems; and, in 1926, The Trail of a Tradition, a study of American nationalism and U.S. foreign policy.

A civic activist, Vandenberg's fraternal memberships included Masons, Shriners, Elks, and Woodmen of the World.

== Senate career 1928–1935 ==
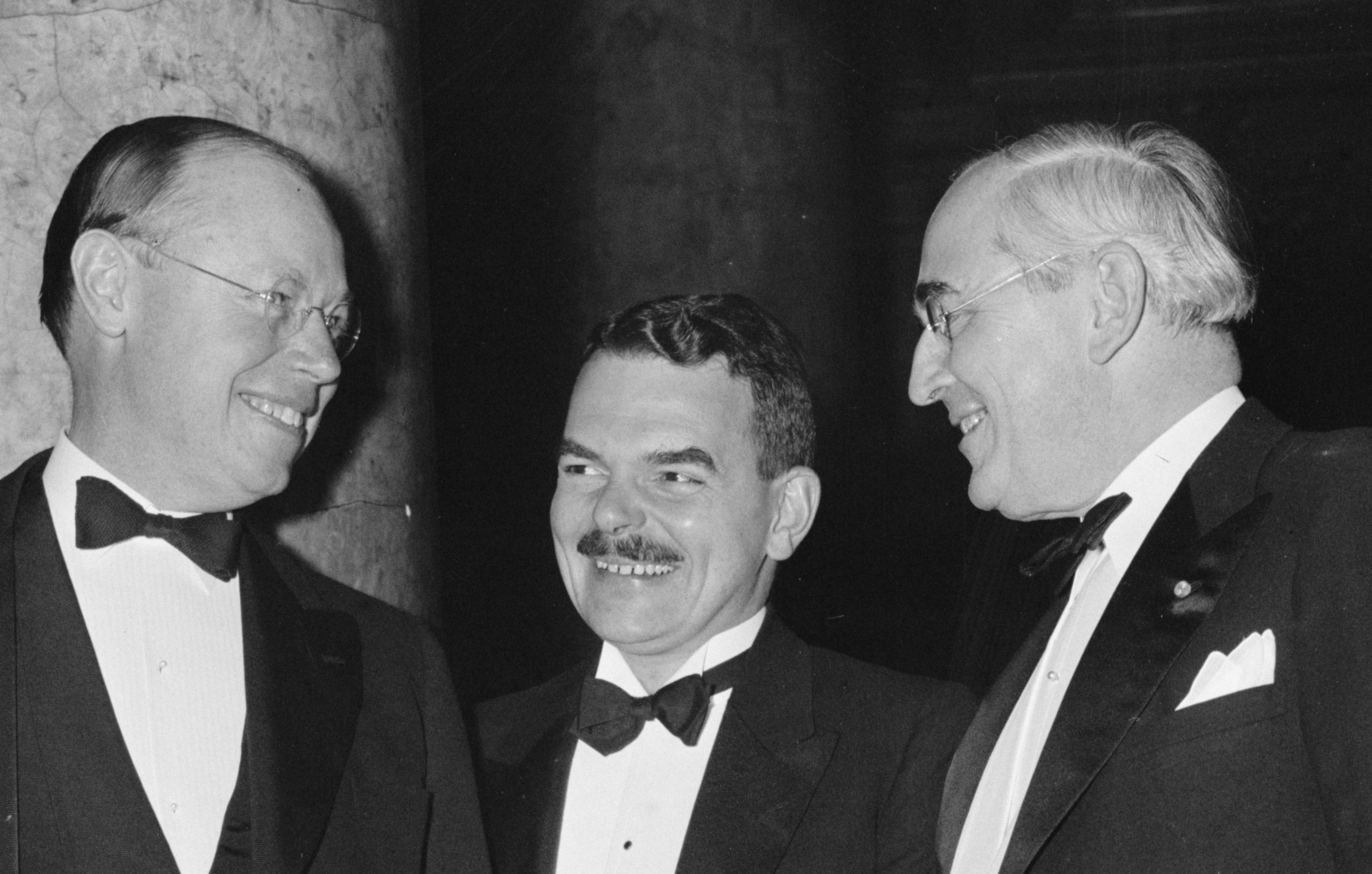
Robert A. Taft, Thomas E. Dewey, and Vandenberg at a 1939 Gridiron Dinner

On March 31, 1928, Governor Fred W. Green appointed 44-year-old Vandenberg to fill the vacancy caused by the death of Senator Woodbridge N. Ferris, a Democrat. Green considered resigning so he could be appointed to the vacancy. He also considered several other candidates, including former governors Albert Sleeper and Chase Osborn. In addition, Green considered Representative Joseph W. Fordney, who would have been a placeholder until the election for the remainder of Ferris' term. Green finally decided upon Vandenberg, who immediately declared his intention to stand for election to both the short, unexpired term and the full six-year term.

He became the fifth former journalist then serving in the U.S. Senate. Governor Green "stressed the advantage of youth as a qualification for the rough-and-tumble of life in Washington committee rooms" which was deemed an explanation for appointing Vandenberg over the aged Fordney. "Fellow Republican publishers to whom he can look from behind his horn-rimmed glasses for encouragement in his maiden speech are Cutting of New Mexico, Capper of Kansas, La Follette of Wisconsin. Senator-publisher Carter Glass of Virginia sits across the aisle among the Democrats."

In November 1928, Vandenberg was handily elected for a full term, defeating Democratic challenger John W. Bailey with over 70% of the vote. In the Senate, he piloted into law the Reapportionment Act of 1929, which updated the process for redistricting of the House of Representatives after each national census and capped the number of representatives at 435. He was at first an ardent supporter of Republican President Herbert Hoover but he became discouraged by Hoover's intransigence, and failures in dealing with the Great Depression.

After the election of Democrat Franklin D. Roosevelt to the presidency in 1932, Vandenberg went along with most of the early New Deal measures, except for the National Industrial Recovery Act and Agricultural Adjustment Act. With the exception of his amendment to the 1933 Glass–Steagall Banking Act, that created the Federal Deposit Insurance Corporation, Vandenberg failed to secure enactment of any significant legislative proposals. By the 1934 election, though his own political position was precarious, he was still reelected over Democratic candidate Frank Albert Picard by 52,443 votes.

== Opposing the New Deal 1935–1939 ==
When the new Congress convened in 1935, there were only 25 Republican senators, and Vandenberg was one of the most effective opponents of the second New Deal. He voted against most Roosevelt-sponsored measures, notable exceptions being the Banking Act of 1935 and the Social Security Act. He pursued a policy of what he called fiscal responsibility, a balanced budget, states' rights, and reduced taxation. He felt that Franklin Roosevelt had usurped the powers of Congress, and he spoke of the dictatorship of Roosevelt. But at the 1936 Republican National Convention, Vandenberg refused to permit the party to nominate him for vice president, anticipating Roosevelt's victory that year.

As part of the conservative coalition of Republicans and Democrats in the Senate, Vandenberg helped defeat Roosevelt's plan to expand the Supreme Court. He helped defeat the Passamaquoddy Bay tidal power and Florida Canal projects, voted against the National Labor Relations Act, various New Deal tax measures, and the Hours and Wages Act.

== American foreign policy ==
Vandenberg became a member of the United States Senate Foreign Relations Committee in 1929. Starting as an internationalist, he voted in favor of United States membership on the World Court. However, the war clouds gathering in Europe moved him towards isolationism. His experiences during the Nye Committee hearings on the munitions industry, of which he was the Senate co-sponsor, convinced him that entry into World War I had been a disastrous error.

He supported the isolationist Neutrality Acts of the 1930s but wanted and sponsored more severe bills designed to renounce all traditional neutral "rights" and restrict and prevent any action by the president that might cause the United States to be drawn into war. He was one of the most effective of the diehard isolationists in the Senate. Except for advocating aid to Finland after the Soviet invasion of that country and urging a quid pro quo in the Far East to prevent a war with Japan over the Manchuria-China question, his position was consistently isolationist.

In mid-1939 he introduced legislation nullifying the 1911 Treaty of Navigation and Commerce with Japan and urged that the administration negotiate a new treaty with Japan recognizing the status quo with regard to Japan's occupation of Chinese territory. Instead, Roosevelt and Secretary of State Cordell Hull used the resolution as a pretext for giving Japan the required six months' notice of intent to cancel the treaty. On the day of the Pearl Harbor attack his position changed radically. In his private papers he wrote that at Pearl Harbor, isolationism died for any realist. In the end, only one member of Congress, Republican Jeannette Rankin, voted against war with Japan.

== Internationalism 1940–1950 ==
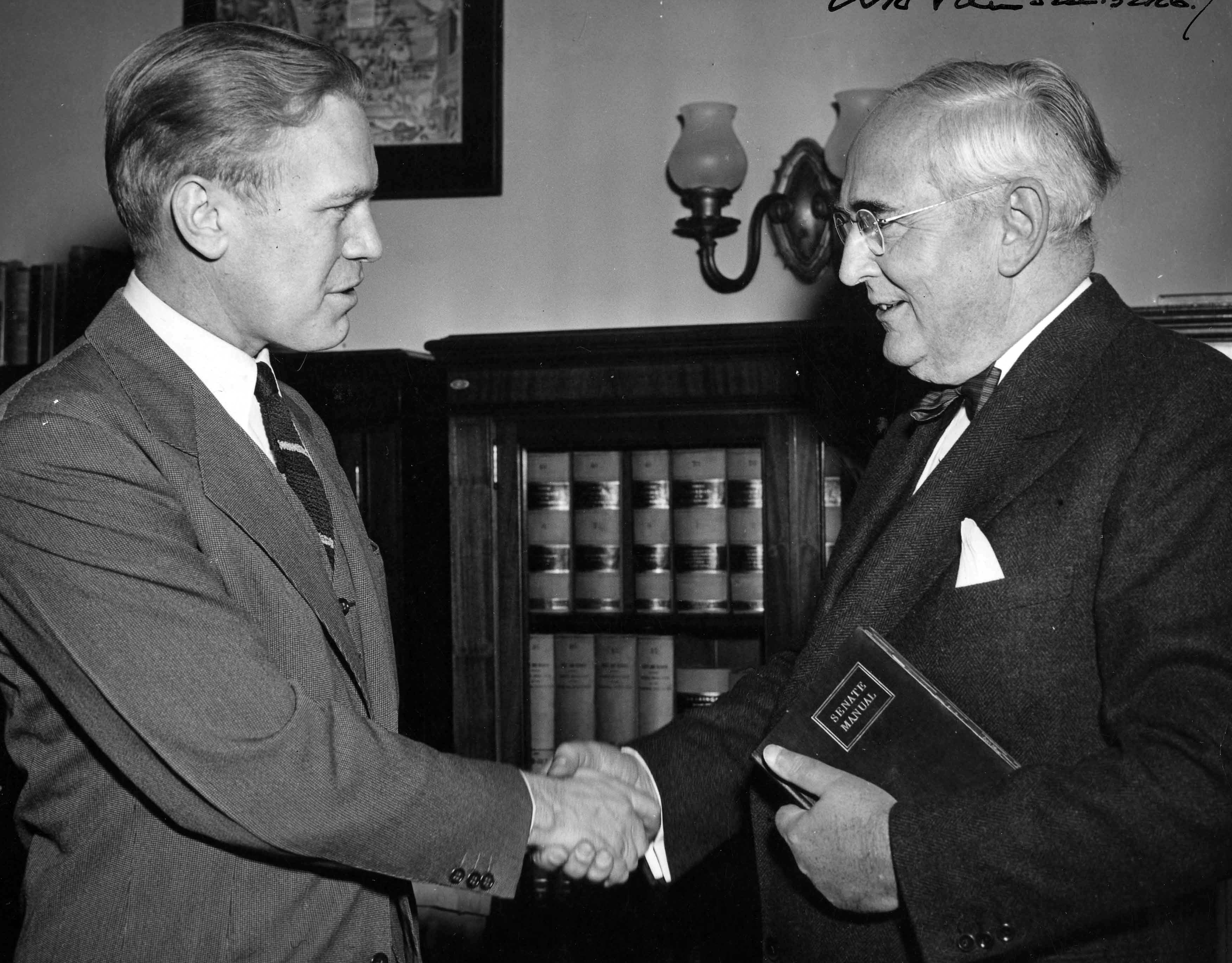
Vandenberg welcomes new congressman Gerald Ford to Washington DC, 1949

In the election of 1940, Vandenberg secured a third term in the Senate by defeating Democratic challenger Frank Fitzpatrick by over 100,000 votes. During World War II, Vandenberg's position on American foreign policy changed radically. Although he continued to vote with the conservative coalition against Roosevelt's domestic proposals, Vandenberg gradually abandoned his isolationism to become an architect of a bipartisan foreign policy, which he defined as a consensus developed by consultation between the president, the State Department, and congressional leaders from both parties, especially those in the Senate.

In 1943, British scholar Isaiah Berlin, working for the British embassy, prepared a confidential intelligence summary of the leaders of the Senate Foreign Relations Committee. He described Vandenberg as:

a member of an old Dutch family and a respectable Mid Western Isolationist. A very adroit political manipulator, and expert parliamentarian and skillful debater. He has perennial presidential ambitions, and is grooming himself into a position of elder statesman. He is something of a snob, not at all Anglophobe, and is a fairly frequent visitor at the White House and the State Department. In common with the rest of his State delegation he votes against the Administration's foreign policies, but has nothing virulent in his constitution and is anxious to convey the impression of reasonableness and moderation. He denies that he is or ever was an Isolationist, and describes himself as a Nationalist ("like Mr. Churchill").

On January 10, 1945, he delivered a celebrated "speech heard round the world" in the Senate Chamber, publicly announcing his conversion from "isolationism" to "internationalism". Following the completion of the Second World War, Vandenberg was elected to his fourth and final term in the U.S. Senate, defeating his Democratic challenger, James H. Lee, by earning over two-thirds of the vote in the 1946 election. In 1947, at the start of the Cold War, Vandenberg became chairman of the Senate Foreign Relations Committee. In that position, he cooperated with the Truman administration in forging bipartisan support for the Truman Doctrine, the Marshall Plan, and NATO, including presenting the critical Vandenberg resolution.

As chairman of the Foreign Relations Committee, he asserted that "politics stops at the water's edge", and cooperated with the Truman administration in forging bipartisan support, distinguishing himself as a "leader of the 'loyal opposition'". Francis O. Wilcox, first chief of staff of the Foreign Relations Committee, recalled Vandenberg's Senate career as an exemplar of bipartisanship in American foreign policy. In October 2000, the Senate bestowed a rare honor on Vandenberg, voting to include his portrait in a "very select collection" in the United States Senate Reception Room.

== Last years ==
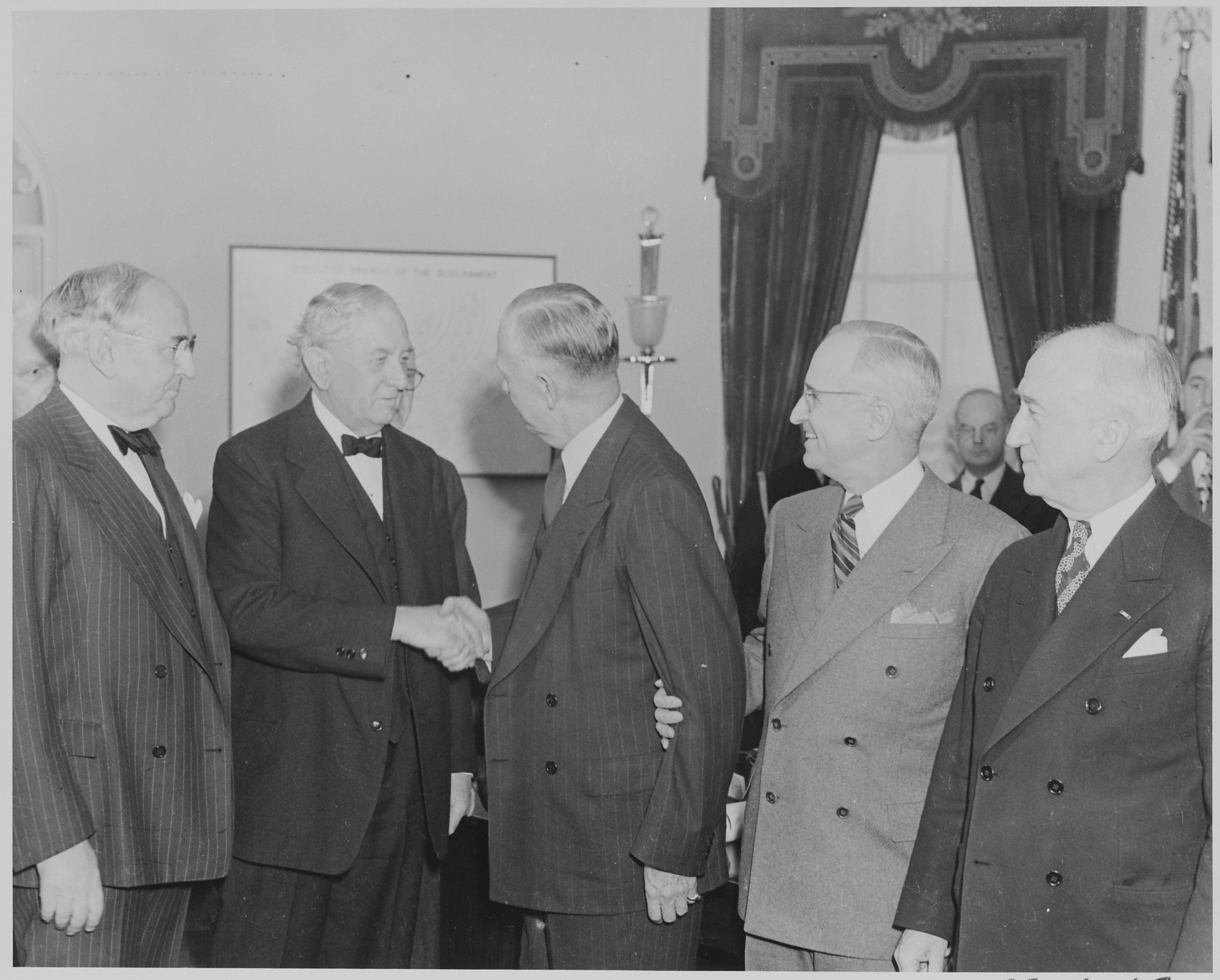
Vandenberg (left) in the Oval Office (1947)

In 1940 and 1948 Vandenberg was a "favorite son" candidate for the Republican presidential nomination. In 1950 Vandenberg announced that he had developed cancer. He died on April 18, 1951, and is buried in Oak Hill Cemetery in Grand Rapids.

== Legacy ==
The former Vandenberg Creative Arts Academy of the Grand Rapids Public Schools was named after him.

In September 2004, a portrait of Vandenberg, along with one of Senator Robert F. Wagner, was unveiled in the Senate Reception Room. The two new portraits joined a group of famous senators, including Henry Clay, Daniel Webster, John C. Calhoun, Robert M. La Follette, and Robert A. Taft. Portraits of this group of senators, known as the "Famous Five", had been unveiled in March 1959. A statue dedicated to Vandenberg was unveiled in May 2005 in downtown Grand Rapids, on Monroe Street, north of Rosa Parks Circle.

Senator Vandenberg is memorialized in a two-sided Michigan historical marker at the Arthur Hendrick Vandenberg Center governmental complex in Grand Rapids; one side honors the center and the other honors Vandenberg personally.

The Vandenberg Room (formerly the Grand Rapids Room) at the University of Michigan is named in honor of Senator Vandenberg's second wife, Hazel.

Vandenberg Hall at Oakland University is named in his honor.

In southeast Michigan, three elementary schools were named after him: one in Redford, another in Southfield, and the third in Wayne, which closed in 2016.

== Noteworthy family members ==
Arthur H. Vandenberg Jr. (1907–1968), the senator's son, worked for the senator for more than a decade. In 1952 President Eisenhower appointed him appointments secretary, but he took a leave of absence before Eisenhower was inaugurated.

Senator Vandenberg's nephew, U.S. Air Force General Hoyt S. Vandenberg, served as Air Force Chief of Staff and director of Central Intelligence. Vandenberg Air Force Base was named in his honor.

Senator Vandenberg's great nephew, Hoyt S. Vandenberg Jr., served as a major general in the Air Force.

== Committee assignments and diplomatic service ==
- President pro tempore of the Senate during the 80th Congress, 1947–1949
- Chairman, U.S. Senate Committee on Enrolled Bills, 1931–1933
- Chairman, Senate Republican Conference, 1945–1947
- Chairman, Committee on Foreign Relations, 1947–1949
- Delegate to the United Nations Conference on International Organization at San Francisco in 1945
- Delegate to the United Nations General Assembly at London and New York City in 1946
- United States adviser to the 2nd and 3rd Council of Foreign Ministers at Paris, and New York City in 1946
- Delegate to the Inter-American Conference for the Maintenance of Continental Peace and Security, at Rio de Janeiro, Brazil, August 15 – September 2, 1947, which drafted the Inter-American Treaty of Reciprocal Assistance (also known as the Rio Treaty)

== See also ==
- List of members of the United States Congress who died in office (1950–1999)

== Published works ==
- The Greatest American: Alexander Hamilton. New York: G.P. Putnam's Sons, 1921.
- If Hamilton Were Here Today: American Fundamentals Applied to Modern Problems. New York: G.P. Putnam's Sons, 1923.
- The Trail of a Tradition. New York: G.P. Putnam's Sons, 1926.

Party political offices
Preceded by Charles E. Townsend	Republican nominee for U.S. Senator from Michigan (Class 1); 1928, 1934, 1940, 1946	Succeeded by Charles E. Potter
U.S. Senate
Preceded by Woodbridge N. Ferris	U.S. Senator (Class 1) from Michigan; 1928–1951	Succeeded by Blair Moody
Political offices
Preceded by Tom Connally	Chair of the United States Senate Committee on Foreign Relations; 1947–1949	Succeeded by Tom Connally
Preceded by Kenneth McKellar	President pro tempore of the United States Senate; January 4, 1947 – January 2, 1949	Succeeded by Kenneth McKellar
