= William A. Glassford =

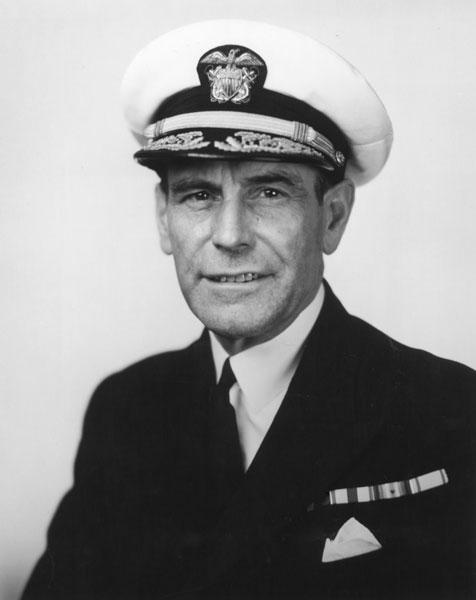
- Born: 6 June 1886; San Francisco, California, U.S.
- Died: 30 July 1958 (aged 72); San Diego, California, U.S.
- Burial place: Arlington National Cemetery
- Military career
- Allegiance: United States of America
- Branch: United States Navy
- Rank: Vice Admiral
- Commands: U.S. Naval Forces Germany
- Conflicts: World War I World War II: Dutch East Indies Campaign; Naval Battle of Balikpapan
- Awards: Distinguished Service Medal (2)

William Alexander Glassford (6 June 1886 – 30 July 1958) was a United States Navy officer with the rank of vice admiral, who is most noted for his service during World War II.

== Early naval career ==
William Alexander Glassford was born on 6 June 1886, in San Francisco, California. His father William A. Glassford (1853–1931) was a career Army officer who retired as a colonel. His brother, Pelham D. Glassford, was an Army officer who attained the rank of brigadier general. Glassford attended the United States Naval Academy at Annapolis, Maryland and graduated on February 12, 1906. He was given the rank of Passed midshipman and ordered for sea duty aboard destroyer USS Preble (DD-12). He spent next two years at sea, as was required by law at the time, then received his commission as an ensign.

== World War II ==
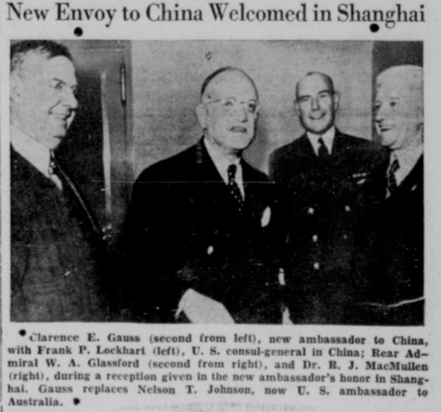
Glassford with Frank P Lockhart, Clarence E. Gauss and RJ McMullen in Shanghai 1941

Glassford commanded naval forces of the United States Asiatic Fleet during the first month of World War II, and then relocated to Java in the Netherlands East Indies to combine his forces with the American-British-Dutch-Australian Command ("ABDA"). His most notable battle was the Naval Battle of Balikpapan, in which he led a U.S. task force in an attack against Japanese forces that had occupied the port of Balikpapan on Borneo. When Glassford's flagships, the light cruisers USS Boise (CL-47) and USS Marblehead (CL-12), were disabled, he ordered his supporting destroyers to continue with the mission under Commander Paul H. Talbot. The attack came too late to prevent the capture of Balikpapan, and had little effect on the Japanese campaign to capture the resources of the Netherlands East Indies.

After the campaign, Glassford returned to the United States where he held a variety of positions in the 6th Naval District and the Eighth Fleet.

Glassford died on 30 July 1958 and was buried at Arlington National Cemetery in Arlington, Virginia.

== Decorations ==
Vice Admiral William A. Glassford's ribbon bar:

1st Row	Navy Distinguished Service Medal with Gold Star			
2nd Row	Mexican Service Medal	World War I Victory Medal with Destroyer Clasp	American Defense Service Medal with Fleet Clasp	
3rd Row	Asiatic-Pacific Campaign Medal with one service star	American Campaign Medal		European-African-Middle Eastern Campaign Medal with two service stars
4th Row	World War II Victory Medal	Honorary Companion of the Order of the Bath (United Kingdom)		Knight Grand Cross of the Order of the Crown of Italy (Italy)
5th Row	Papal Lateran Cross	Knight Grand Cross of the Order of Orange-Nassau with Swords		Commander of the Order of the Star of Africa (Liberia)
