= Robert D. Nesen =

American diplomat (1918–2005)

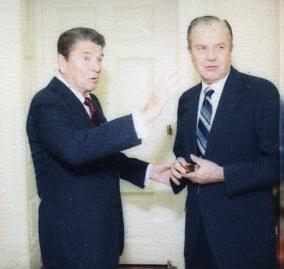
- 1985, on right

16th United States Ambassador to Australia United States Ambassador to Nauru
- In office November 20, 1981 – May 2, 1985
- President: Ronald Reagan
- Preceded by: Philip H. Alston
- Succeeded by: Laurence W. Lane Jr.

Personal details
- Born: January 22, 1918 St. Louis, Michigan
- Died: November 14, 2005 (aged 87) Thousand Oaks, California
- Resting place: Westlake Village, California
- Party: Republican
- Education: Tri-State College; Curtiss-Wright Technical Institute

Robert Dean Nesen (January 22, 1918 – November 14, 2005) was an American car dealer and diplomat who served as the U.S. Assistant Secretary of the Navy (Financial Management and Comptroller) from 1972 to 1974 and as United States Ambassador to Australia from 1981 to 1985.

== Biography ==
Robert D. Nesen was born January 22, 1918, in St. Louis, Michigan. He was educated at Tri-State College and the Curtiss-Wright Technical Institute, receiving a B.S. in Aeronautical Engineering in 1941. He worked for the Air-Research Corp. until 1942, when he joined the United States Navy, serving in World War II until 1946. Upon leaving the Navy, Nesen remained a member of the United States Navy Reserve, ultimately attaining the rank of Lieutenant Commander before retiring from the Navy Reserve in 1966.

Upon leaving the Navy in 1946, he opened the Coast Aero Flying Service in Oxnard, California. Nesen started in the automobile business a few year later, opening an Oldsmobile car dealership in Oxnard. The dealership added Cadillac in the mid-1950s and then in 1971, moved to a new facility in Thousand Oaks, California. The business continued to grow in what became known as the "Thousand Oaks Auto Mall" and took on many more franchises; from Subaru and Hyundai in the 1970s and 1980s to high-end exotic brands like Rolls-Royce and Bentley in the 1990s.

Governor of California Ronald Reagan appointed Nesen to the California New Car Dealers Policy and Appeals Board, and Nesen was elected as that organization's first president. Reagan later appointed him to the California State Board of Education. Nesen was active in the Republican Party during this period and served as chairman, and then cochairman, of the California delegation to the Republican National Convention. In 1970, he became a member of the Executive Committee of the National Review Board of the United States Department of State.

In 1972, President of the United States Richard Nixon nominated Nesen as Assistant Secretary of the Navy (Financial Management and Comptroller) and Nesen subsequently served in this office from May 31, 1972, until May 15, 1974.

President Reagan named Nesen United States Ambassador to Australia in 1981 and concurrently as Ambassador to the Republic of Nauru, a post he held until 1985. In 1981 and 1987, there was press speculation that President Reagan would name Nesen United States Secretary of the Navy, but this never happened.

In 1991, Nesen was inducted into the Automotive Hall of Fame.

Nesen died in Thousand Oaks, California, on November 14, 2005, at the age of 87.

Government offices
Preceded by Frank P. Sanders	Assistant Secretary of the Navy (Financial Management and Comptroller); May 31, 1972 – May 15, 1974	Succeeded by Gary D. Penisten
Diplomatic posts
Preceded by Philip H. Alston	United States Ambassador to Australia; 1981–1985	Succeeded by Laurence W. Lane Jr.
Preceded by Philip H. Alston	United States Ambassador to Nauru; 1981–1985	Succeeded by Laurence W. Lane Jr.
