= United States Senate Reception Room =

Room in the United States Capitol

Senate Reception Room
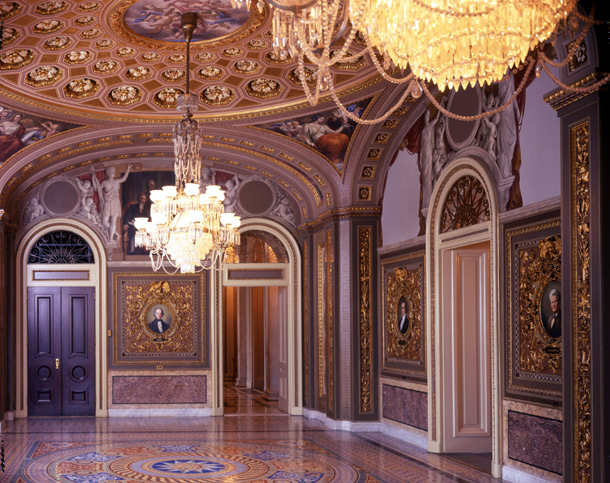
- Southwest corner of the Senate Reception Room in 2004
- Building: United States Capitol
- Location: Washington, DC
- Country: United States
- Purpose: Meetings

The United States Senate Reception Room is located in the United States Capitol and is one of the Capitol's most richly decorated public rooms that features the work of Italian artist Constantino Brumidi. The room, numbered S-213, has historically been used for meetings and ceremonies. These decorations feature nine permanent portraits of the greatest senators as determined by a Senate committee. These portraits are placed in massive and ornate golden frames.

== Senator portraits ==
In 1957, a Senate Committee headed by then Senator John F. Kennedy was tasked to decide on the five greatest U.S. Senators of all time so their portraits could decorate the Senate Reception Room. Three of the selections were the "Great Triumvirate":

- John C. Calhoun (South Carolina)
- Henry Clay (Kentucky)
- Daniel Webster (Massachusetts)

The other two selections were:

- Robert M. La Follette (Wisconsin)
- Robert A. Taft (Ohio)

The aforementioned were nicknamed the "famous five", and at times have been referred to by media as being in the Senate's "hall of fame".

In 2004, Arthur H. Vandenberg (Michigan) and Robert F. Wagner (New York) were added. In 2006, a mural commemorating the Connecticut Compromise (also known as the Great Compromise of 1787) was added with Roger Sherman and Oliver Ellsworth of Connecticut, resulting in the group's informal name becoming the "famous nine".
