= Myron M. Cowen =

American diplomat and lawyer (1898–1965)

4th United States Ambassador to Australia
- In office 1948–1949
- President: Harry S. Truman
- Preceded by: Robert Butler
- Succeeded by: Pete Jarman

Personal details
- Born: January 25, 1898 Logan, Iowa
- Died: November 1, 1965 (aged 67) Washington, DC
- Parent(s): Aaron Harry; Dora T. Blala
- Education: Wofford College; Drake University

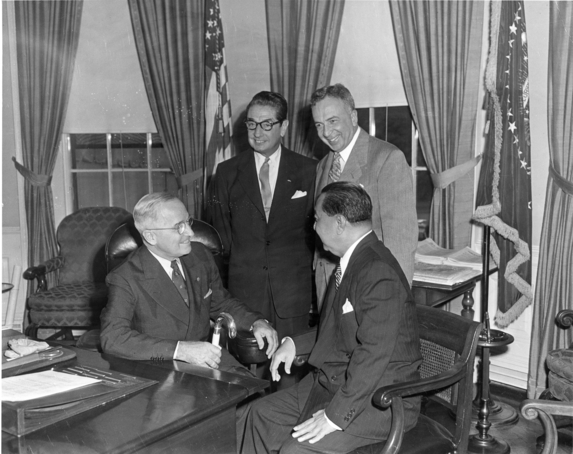
Myron Cowen (standing, right), with US President Harry S. Truman (seated, left), Philippine President Elpidio Quirino (seated, right), and Philippine Ambassador to the US Joaquín Miguel Elizalde (standing, left)

Myron Melvin Cowen (January 25, 1898 – November 1, 1965) was an American lawyer and diplomat, who served as US Ambassador to Australia, Belgium and Philippines.

== Biography ==
Cowen was born in Logan, Iowa. His father was Aaron Harry and mother was Dora T. Blala Cowen. Cowen studied in Wofford College of Spartanburg, S.C. from 1914–1915 and graduated from Drake University of Des Moines in 1918. From 1919 to 1926, he practiced law in Des Moines. From 1926 to 1933, he was the commissioner for the US court of Appeals in Washington D.C., where he continued his legal practice from 1935 to 1948. He was appointed US Ambassador to Australia from 1948 to 1949 and afterwards served as US ambassador to Philippines from 1949 to 1952. He expected a less corrupt and capable government for Philippine and suggested a covert action to oust then Philippine president, Elpidio Quirino. From 1952 to 1953, he was US ambassador to Belgium. Until his death in Washington, D.C., he practiced law.

Diplomatic posts
Preceded by Robert Butler	United States Ambassador to Australia; 1948–1949	Succeeded by Pete Jarman
Preceded by Emmet O'Neal	United States Ambassador to the Philippines; 1949–1951	Succeeded by Raymond A. Spruance
Preceded by Robert Daniel Murphy	United States Ambassador to Belgium; 1952–1953	Succeeded by Frederick M. Alger Jr.
