= Nelson T. Johnson =

American diplomat (1887–1954)

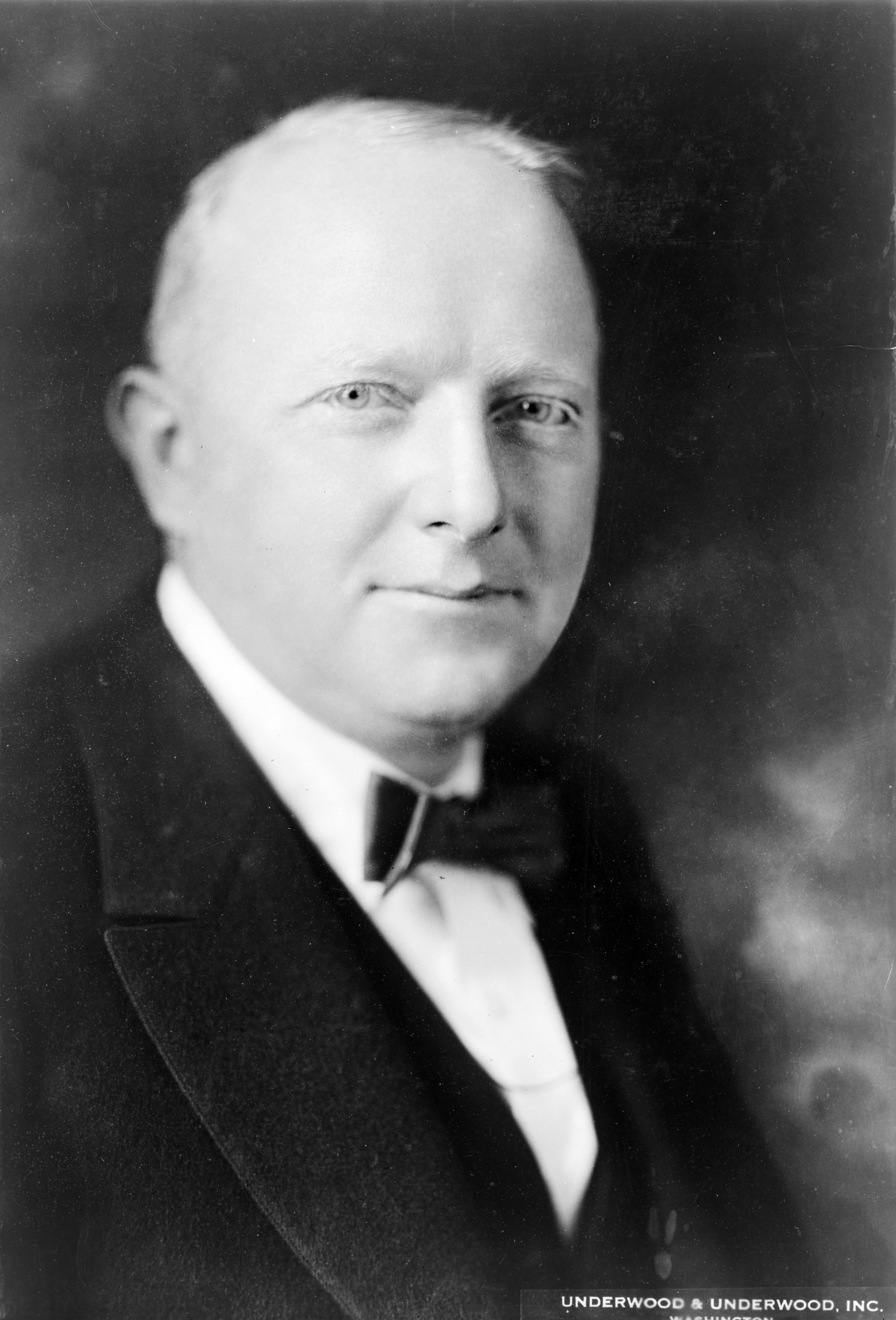
- Johnson in the 1920s

2nd United States Minister to Australia
- In office September 12, 1941 – April 20, 1945
- Preceded by: Clarence E. Gauss
- Succeeded by: Robert Butler

Personal details
- Born: April 3, 1887 Washington, DC
- Died: December 3, 1954 (aged 67)
- Spouse: Jane Augusta Washington Thornton Beck (m. 1931)
- Relations: George T. Beck (father-in-law)
- Education: George Washington University

Nelson Trusler Johnson (April 3, 1887 – December 3, 1954) was an American diplomat who served as the US Minister to China from 1929 to mid-September 1935. Then, until 1941, he was US Ambassador to the Republic of China and then to Australia from 1941 to 1945.

== Early life and career ==
Johnson was born in the family row house located at 1st and East Capitol Streets (now a part of the location of the United States Supreme Court) in Washington, DC. He spent part of his early life in Newkirk, Oklahoma and then Kildare, Oklahoma. He then returned to Washington, DC, and graduated from Sidwell Friends School, near 8th Street and I Street NW, in 1906. He then went to George Washington University and pledged to the Delta Tau Delta fraternity. Near the end of his freshman year, he decided to take the Foreign Service Examination, claiming his residency as Oklahoma. During the summer of 1907 while working at the Library of Congress he prepared for the general exam and studied German to meet the language requirements. Shortly thereafter, at the age of twenty he received an appointment to the Foreign Service and departed for China.

He spent his entire adult life in the service of his government. Johnson specialized in China and the rest of the Far East, He spent his first two years as a student interpreter during which time he engaged in an unorthodox language program in Peking where he learned to speak Chinese well. Beginning in 1909 at Mukden, he served in numerous posts as a consular officer. In 1925 he was appointed Chief of the Division of Far Eastern Affairs, next as Assistant Secretary of State (1927- end of 1929), then as Minister to China (the end of 1929 - Mid-September 1935), and Ambassador to China Mid-September 1935 - May 1941). Wishing to be united with his family he accepted a lesser post as minister to Australia during World War II (1941-1945).

== Influence on Far Eastern policy ==
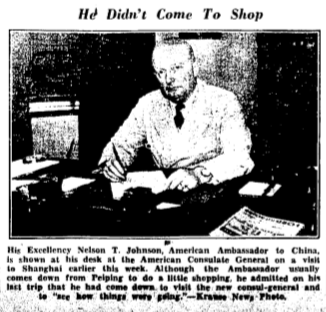
United States Ambassador to China Nelson T Johnson working in the US Consulate in Shanghai in 1936

Johnson first became intimately involved in shaping American policy toward China in 1925 when he assumed the office of Chief of the Division of Far Eastern Affairs in the State Department. In 1929 he came to China as the U.S. Minister to the Republic of China. His title was Minister, rather than Ambassador, because the U.S. Legation in China had not been raised to the status of an embassy. When in May 1935 Japan said that it planned to raise its Legation in China to the grade of embassy the U.S. moved to follow suit. Due to the required Senate confirmation Johnson did not officially become U.S. ambassador to the R.O.C until mid-September 1935. Both as Minister and as Ambassador to the R.O.C, Johnson provided the State Department with important communications that assisted the Coolidge, Hoover, and Roosevelt administrations determine their policies with respect to China and China's unsettled relationship with Japan and the Western powers. For example, during Japan's invasion of Manchuria, which began on the evening of September 18, 1931 near Shenyang, Johnson urged Hoover's Secretary of State, Stimson to avoid any appearance of siding with Japan, and to rather uphold the Nine-Power Treaty, which affirmed China's sovereignty. Far Eastern expert Dorothy Borg wrote, "Johnson's cable made a deep impression on Stimson..." Johnson made major contributions during the Coolidge, Hoover, and the early Roosevelt administrations. He favored going as far as American interests would allow in helping China regain its sovereignty, and he consistently guided US Secretaries of State Kellogg and Stimson on a moderate course in their policy.

Johnson was Kellogg's principal advisor on US foreign policy in China. Perceiving that Western imperialism in Asia was coming to an end, Johnson advocated for the US and other Western powers to restore Chinese sovereignty and end extraterritoriality as soon as possible. Understanding that a violent revolution was necessary to improve China's development, Johnson and Kellogg both hoped that by playing a major role in the restoration of Chinese sovereignty the U.S. would continue to maintain good relations with China. Over the course of his tenure as ambassador, Johnson consistently opposed U.S. interference in Chinese affairs, advocating for a conciliatory American approach during the 1925 Canton–Hong Kong strike and Nanking incident of 1927; in June 1925, the Chinese government sent a note to U.S. officials requesting a revision of existing Sino-American treaties, to which Johnson responded positively. A new treaty between the U.S. and China was signed in July 1928, granting the Chinese government tariff autonomy and containing mutual guarantees of most-favored-nation treatment. The treaty marked a milestone Kellogg's and Johnson' quest to champion China's sovereignty.

Under Stimson, Johnson made a significant contribution when, as American Minister in China, he influenced Stimson's policy during the Manchurian incident, i.e., during Japan's invasion of Manchuria. His recommendation that the United States make a statement for upholding the terms of the Nine-Power Treaty left "a deep impression upon" Stimson and encouraged him "to pursue a course upon which he had already started" and which culminated in his letter to letter to US Senator William E. Borah, which was published on February 23, 1932.

In the mid-1930s, Johnson's influence continued, but other officials gained ascendancy as policy became more oriented to Japan. He grew increasingly impatient with Japanese aggression and began suggesting a reappraisal of American policy toward Japan. While not yet recommending that the U.S. assume any responsibility for the Chinese, he still advocated rearmament and reconsideration of its intention to grant independence to the Philippines.

By the end of the decade, Johnson openly advocated material support for the Republic of China. The Chinese had then established a measure of order and had demonstrated a will to resist Japan and he believed they deserved support. His descriptions of the events of the war and of the valiant fight of the Chinese were instrumental in the decision to grant assistance to them. For example, when on October 18, 1940 Chiang-Kai-shek informed the U.S. that a major increase in military assistance would be required to continue to resist Japan and accordingly requested 500 planes, volunteer American pilots to fly them, and a large loan, Johnson strongly supported Chiang's request. Johnson said that by fulfilling Chiang's request the U.S. would "move beyond "flimsy aid" and "callous and dangerous disregard" for China's precarious situation. FDR rejected Chiang's full request. But recognizing that something had to be done fast he told Treasury Secretary Morgenthau that it was "a matter of life and death," and ordered Morgenthau and Under Secretary of State Welles to arrange a $100 million loan at once. Also, with FDR's full support Secretary of War Stimson and Chief of Staff Marshall diverted 100 pursuit planes from British orders and made them available for use in China, i.e., defending the Burma road.

== Personal life ==
Johnson married Jane Augusta Washington Thornton Beck in Peiping (Peking), China. The second daughter of Wyoming pioneer George T. Beck, she was born on October 21, 1900, in Cody, Wyoming. She died February 28, 1991, in Washington, DC. at 91.

They were married in Peiping and were then registered at the US consulate in Tianjin, China, on October 10, 1931.

He was on the cover of Time on 11 December 1939.

Both are buried in Rock Creek Cemetery, near the Old Soldiers' Home, in Northeastern Washington, DC.

== Sources ==
- The American Secretaries of State and Their Diplomacy, vol. 11.
- Time, December 11, 1939.
- Borg, Dorothy (1964). The United States and the Far Eastern Crisis of 1933-1938: From the Manchurian Incident through the Initial Stage of the Undeclared Sino-Japanese War. Cambridge: Harvard University Press.
- Buhite, Russell D. (1968). Nelson T. Johnson and American Policy toward China, 1925-1941. East Lansing: Michigan State University Press.
- Cohen, Warren I. (2010). America's Response to China: A History of Sino-American Relations (Fifth ed.). New York: Columbia University Press.
- Wood, Herbert J.; Burns, Richard Dean; Bennett, Edward M. (1974). "Nelson Trusler Johnson". Diplomats in Crisis: United States-Chinese-Japanese Relations, 1919-1941. Santa Barbara, California: Clio Books. ISBN 978-0686840121.

Diplomatic posts
| Preceded by John Van Antwerp MacMurray (as Envoy to the Republic of China) | U.S. Ambassador to China; 1929–1941 | Succeeded by Clarence E. Gauss |
| Preceded by Clarence E. Gauss | U.S. Ambassador to Australia; 1941–1945 | Succeeded by Robert Butler |
