= Howard P. Jones =

American diplomat

Howard Palfrey Jones (January 2, 1899 – September 1973) was a United States diplomat whose career was focused on Southeast and East Asia. Between March 1958 and April 1965, Jones served as the United States Ambassador to Indonesia during the last years of the Sukarno presidency. He was known for his warm friendship and good rapport with President Sukarno, the first President of Indonesia and the country's premier nationalist leader.

== Biography ==
After graduating from the University of Wisconsin he became a newspaper editor in Evansville, Indiana. There, despite threats to Jones from the KKK grand eagle, the newspaper ran an article on KKK-run criminal activities and their control over local police.

Howard Jones served as a colonel in the United States Army during World War II and later worked for the Economic Cooperation Administration after the War. He briefly worked as a journalist before joining the United States Agency for International Development (USAID). Between July 1954 and July 1955, he served in the dual role as the director of the USAID program in Indonesia and the embassy's economic counsellor at the US Embassy in Jakarta. From February 1956 to April 1957, he served as the Deputy Assistant Secretary of the Bureau of Far Eastern Economic Affairs at the State Department's headquarters in Washington, D.C. In addition, Jones also held the position of Deputy Assistant Secretary of State for Far Eastern Affairs between May 1957 and February 1958.

In March 1958, Howard Jones was appointed as United States Ambassador to Indonesia, a position which he would hold for the next seven years. Jones played an important role in repairing the damaged caused to United States-Indonesian relations by the Eisenhower Administration's covert support for the failed PRRI/Permesta regional uprisings in Sumatra and the Celebes. Following the capture of an American pilot Allen Lawrence Pope who was participating in a Central Intelligence Agency (CIA) black op in support of the Permesta rebels, Jones portrayed Pope as an American "paid soldier of fortune" and expressed his regret at the involvement of an American. According to the political scientists and Indonesia experts Audrey Kahin and George McTurnan Kahin, Pope's capture exposed United States support for the PRRI-Permesta rebels and embarrassed the Eisenhower Administration. Ambassador Jones praised the Indonesian government for not seeking to make political capital out of the Popes affair. However, Jones privately expressed anger at his Government for causing the deaths of 700 civilians. The Popes affair contributed to a left-ward drift in Indonesian politics which helped the Indonesian Communist Party (PKI).

Following the resignation of John Foster Dulles as Secretary of State in 1959, Howard Jones and his allies gained greater support for their accommodationist policies towards Indonesia in the United States Government. This trend was accelerated during the John F. Kennedy presidency (1961–1963). The Kennedy Administration repaired Washington's relations with Indonesia by helping to broker a peaceful settlement to the West New Guinea dispute in August 1962. In addition, Sukarno cultivated a warm personal relationship with Howard Jones and regarded him as friendly and trustworthy. However, Sukarno still disliked the CIA and believed that the intelligence agency was plotting to overthrow him – a belief that would later be revealed to be well founded. According to another former US diplomat and colleague Edward E. Masters, Howard Jones genuinely believed that Sukarno was a moderate who was not hostile towards the United States but was instead misled by ill-intentioned advisers like the-then Indonesian Foreign Minister Subandrio. This optimistic view was not shared by other American diplomats including Masters and Francis Joseph Galbraith, the Deputy Chief of Mission. Despite these differences, Jones was remembered by his colleagues at the US Embassy in Jakarta as a kind, gentle man who harbored no bitterness.

According to George Kahin, Howard Jones was critical of the CIA's interference in Indonesian politics. The CIA disliked Jones for his conciliatory approach towards President Sukarno and sought to have him replaced by undermining his reputation on charges of being soft on the Indonesian Communists. Jones was also critical of British policies towards the creation of Malaysia; particularly the reluctance of the British authorities to consult their Indonesian and Philippines counterparts and the joint decision of the Malayan Prime Minister Tunku Abdul Rahman and the British Colonial Secretary Duncan Sandys to proceed with the creation of Malaysia on September 16, 1963 without waiting for the United Nations Ascertainment Mission in Sarawak and Sabah to produce their results. However, Jones' criticisms of the British was overruled by the Lyndon B. Johnson Administration, which was unsympathetic to Sukarno's policy of Confrontation with Malaysia.

Ultimately, Howard Jones' efforts to induce a pro-American shift in Indonesian foreign policy failed due to Sukarno's increasing hostility to the West and his rapprochement with the People's Republic of China. On May 24, 1965, Howard Jones returned to the United States and was succeeded by Marshall Green, who abandoned Jones' conciliatory policy towards Sukarno and was present during the Transition to the New Order. In April 1971, Jones published a memoir of his experiences working in Indonesia, called Indonesia: The Possible Dream.

== Notes and references ==
Diplomatic posts
Preceded by John M. Allison	United States Ambassador to Indonesia; 1958–1965	Succeeded by Marshall Green
