= List of ambassadors of the United States to Australia =

Ambassador of the United States to Australia
- Seal of the United States Department of State

- Flag of a United States ambassador

- Incumbent; Dave Brat since September 29, 2026
- Inaugural holder: Clarence E. Gauss (as U.S. Minister to Australia)
- Formation: 1940 (86 years ago)
- Website: Official website

The position of United States Ambassador to Australia has existed since 1940. U.S.–Australian relations have been close throughout the history of Australia. Before World War II, Australia was closely aligned with the United Kingdom, but it has strengthened its relationship with the United States since 1942, as Britain's influence in Asia has declined and the United States' influence has increased. At the governmental level, United States–Australia relationships are formalized by the ANZUS treaty and Australia-United States Free Trade Agreement.

The embassy in Canberra has long been regarded as a desirable posting and hence has become a patronage position. U.S. Ambassadors to Australia have traditionally been friends, political allies, or former business associates of the incumbent president. Some have been major donors to the president's election campaign or political party. Few have been career diplomats (Marshall Green was a conspicuous exception). The two ambassadors during the Bush Administration, for example, were Tom Schieffer, a former business associate of President Bush, and Robert McCallum Jr., a Bush college friend. In 1942, President Franklin Delano Roosevelt's close associate and nominee to be U.S. Minister in Canberra, Edward J. Flynn, was forced to withdraw his nomination for the position following difficulties in the senate confirmation process. The actor Fess Parker was offered the post in 1985 by Ronald Reagan, after representing Reagan at an event in Australia. Parker considered it, but turned it down.

This arrangement has suited Australian governments, which welcome the ability of such ambassadors to gain direct access to the president, bypassing the State Department. However, this has often had the result of long periods without an appointed ambassador and additional delays in the Senate confirmation process, with the career diplomat deputy head of mission serving as chargé d’affaires ad interim, such as between February 2005 and August 2006, from September 2016 to February 2019, from January 2021 to July 2022 and from November 2024 to September 2026.

== United States ambassadors to Australia ==
The following individuals have served as the U.S. ambassadors to Australia, or any precedent titles:

List of U.S. ambassadors to Australia
Ordinal	Officeholder	Image	Term began	Term ended	Time in office	Notes
U.S. Ministers to Australia
1	Clarence E. Gauss		July 17, 1940	March 5, 1941		
2	Nelson T. Johnson		September 12, 1941	April 20, 1945		
U.S. Ambassadors to Australia
3	Robert Butler		1946	1948		
4	Myron M. Cowen		1948	1949		
5	Pete Jarman		June 8, 1949	July 31, 1953	4 years, 53 days	
6	Amos J. Peaslee		August 12, 1953	February 16, 1956		
7	Douglas M. Moffat		1956	1956		
8	William J. Sebald		March 14, 1957	October 31, 1961	4 years, 231 days	
9	William C. Battle		July 13, 1962	August 31, 1964	2 years, 49 days	
10	Ed Clark		1965	1967		
11	William H. Crook		1968	1969		
12	Walter L. Rice		1969	1973		
13	Marshall Green		June 8, 1973	July 31, 1975		
14	James Ward Hargrove		1976	1977		
15	Philip H. Alston		1977	1981		
16	Robert D. Nesen		November 20, 1981	May 2, 1985	3 years, 163 days	
17	Laurence W. Lane		December 6, 1985	April 29, 1989	3 years, 144 days	
18	Melvin F. Sembler		October 10, 1989	February 28, 1993	3 years, 141 days	
19	Edward J. Perkins		November 24, 1993	July 19, 1996	2 years, 238 days	
20	Genta H. Holmes		April 11, 1997	July 23, 2000	3 years, 103 days	
21	Edward (Skip) Gnehm		August 30, 2000	June 22, 2001	296 days	
−	Michael P. Owens		June 22, 2001	August 22, 2001	61 days	Chargé d’affaires
22	Thomas Schieffer		August 23, 2001	February 18, 2005	3 years, 179 days	
−	William Stanton		February 19, 2005	July 5, 2006	1 year, 136 days	Chargé d’affaires
−	Michael P. Owens		July 5, 2006	August 23, 2006	49 days	Chargé d’affaires
23	Robert McCallum, Jr.		August 24, 2006	January 20, 2009	2 years, 149 days	
−	Daniel A. Clune		January 20, 2009	November 26, 2009	310 days	Chargé d’affaires
24	Jeff Bleich		November 26, 2009	September 12, 2013	3 years, 290 days	
−	J. Thomas Dougherty		September 12, 2013	September 24, 2013	12 days	Chargé d’affaires
25	John Berry		September 25, 2013	September 20, 2016	2 years, 361 days	
−	James Carouso		September 21, 2016	March 12, 2019	2 years, 173 days	Chargé d’affaires
26	Arthur B. Culvahouse Jr.		March 13, 2019	January 19, 2021	1 year, 312 days	
−	Michael B. Goldman		January 20, 2021	July 25, 2022	1 year, 141 days	Chargé d’affaires
27	Caroline Kennedy		July 25, 2022	November 28, 2024	2 years, 129 days	
−	Erika Olson		November 28, 2024	July 6, 2026	1 year, 220 days	Chargé d’affaires
−	Robert T. Koepcke		August 3, 2026	September 19, 2026	47 days	Chargé d’affaires
28	Dave Brat		September 29, 2026	Incumbent	39 days	

== See also ==
- Australia–United States relations
- Ambassadors of the United States
- Embassy of the United States, Canberra
- Embassy of Australia, Washington, D.C.
- Ambassadors of Australia to the United States
- Consuls-General of Australia in New York
