= Gary D. Penisten =

American executive (1931–2018)

Gary Dean Penisten (May 14, 1931 – December 29, 2018) was an American executive who served as United States Assistant Secretary of the Navy (Financial Management and Comptroller) from 1974 to 1977.

== Biography ==
Gary Dean Penisten was born in Lincoln, Nebraska in 1931. He was educated at the University of Nebraska at Omaha, graduating in 1953. Upon graduating, Penisten took a job with General Electric, and worked there for twenty-one years.

In 1974 President of the United States Gerald Ford nominated Penisten as Assistant Secretary of the Navy (Financial Management and Comptroller). Penisten held this office from October 15, 1974 until May 20, 1977. In 2001, Penisten published a memoir of his time in office entitled Pentagon Appointment: A Mid-Career Adventure.

Upon leaving the United States Department of the Navy, Penisten became Chief Financial Officer of Sterling Drug, a position he held until 1988.

Penisten served on the Board of Directors of several corporations. He was Chairman of the Board of Acme United Corp. from 1996 to 2006.

Penisten died from complications of Parkinson’s disease on December 29, 2018, at the age of 87.

Government offices
Preceded by Robert D. Nesen	Assistant Secretary of the Navy (Financial Management and Comptroller); October 15, 1974–May 20, 1977	Succeeded by George A. Peapples
