= Bill Lane (diplomat) =

American diplomat and publisher (1919–2010)

17th United States Ambassador to Australia United States Ambassador to Nauru
- In office December 6, 1985 – April 29, 1989
- President: Ronald Reagan
- Preceded by: Robert D. Nesen
- Succeeded by: Mel Sembler

Personal details
- Born: November 7, 1919 Des Moines, Iowa, U.S.
- Died: July 31, 2010 (aged 90)
- Party: Republican
- Spouse: Jean Gimbel Lane
- Children: 3
- Parent(s): Laurence William Lane (father); Ruth Bell (mother)
- Education: Pomona College; Stanford University

Laurence William Lane Jr. (November 7, 1919 – July 31, 2010) was an American magazine publisher, diplomat, and philanthropist.

== Early life and education ==
Lane was born November 7, 1919, to Laurence William Lane (1890 – February 20, 1967) and Ruth Bell. His father was known as "Larry", so he was generally called "Bill". In 1928, the family moved from Des Moines, Iowa where Larry Lane was advertising director for the Meredith Corporation (publisher of Better Homes and Gardens magazine) to California. The Lane family owned and published Sunset magazine. Lane graduated from Palo Alto High School.

Bill Lane attended Pomona College before transferring to Stanford University to study journalism. He was a member of the Stanford Chaparral. After graduating with a bachelor's degree from Stanford, he joined the US Navy during World War II.

Lane married Donna Jean Gimbel in 1955. They met while she was working as an interior designer in Chicago.

== Career ==
As their father phased himself out of the business, Bill took over the Sunset Magazine publishing and brother Melvin (1922–2007) managed the Sunset Books business.

Lane was the first mayor and one of the founders of Portola Valley, California in 1964. From 1975 to 1976, he served as US Ambassador-at-large and lived in Japan. From 1985 to 1989, he was appointed US Ambassador to Australia and Nauru. Ronald Reagan knew Lane from their membership in the Los Rancheros Vistadores horseback riding club.

The Lane publishing business was sold to Time Warner in 1990. In March 1993 he was appointed an honorary officer of the Order of Australia for service to Australian-American relations.

In 1995, Lane was named Conservationist of the Year by the National Parks Conservation Association (NPCA).

In 2006, Lane received the American Academy for Park and Recreation Administration's Pugsley Medal in 2006 because of his contributions to parks and conservation with advocacy through his magazine, leadership positions on a host of national and regional boards and advisory committees, and personal philanthropy.

== Philanthropy, death and legacy ==
The Lane family were large donors to Stanford University including renovations in 1983 to the Palo Alto Stock Farm Horse Barn and after the 1989 Loma Prieta earthquake, for the reconstruction of the Stanford Memorial Church and other historic campus buildings. In 2005, a donation to Stanford University named the Center for the Study of the North American West department after the Lane family.

Lane, with a long interest in aviation, was a founding member of the Hiller Aviation Museum in San Carlos, California.

The Lanes sponsored an internship program starting in 2002, the Bill and Jean Lane Internship Endowment at the National Museum of Natural History of the Smithsonian Institution.

In 2005, Lane and his wife (who graduated from Northwestern University in 1952) funded the Jean Gimbel Lane Prize in Piano Performance at the Bienen School of Music. In 2015, an additional $5 million endowment to Northwestern University was announced.

With a large donation to the UC Santa Cruz Arboretum, the Lanes established the Jean and Bill Lane Botanical Library in 1994, a non-lending library focusing on South African, Australian, New Zealand, and California plants.

Bill and Jean Lane endowed the Lane Family Lectureship in Environmental Science at Washington State University. The lecture was inaugurated in 1993. With their son, Robert, a 1983 WSU graduate, they also created the Robert Lane Fellowship in Environmental Science to support graduate students studying environmental science at Washington State University.

Bill Lane died on July 31, 2010, at the age of 90. His wife, Jean Lane, died in Portola Valley on November 18, 2017, after a brief illness, at the age of 87. Together they were survived by their three children, daughters Sharon Louise Lane and Brenda Lane Munks, and son Robert Laurence Lane.

Diplomatic posts
Preceded by Robert D. Nesen	United States Ambassador to Australia; 1985–1989	Succeeded by Mel Sembler
Preceded by Robert D. Nesen	United States Ambassador to Nauru; 1985–1989	Succeeded by Mel Sembler
