= Marshall Green =

American diplomat (1916–1998)

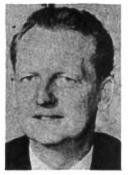

United States Ambassador to Nauru
- In office October 26, 1974 – July 31, 1975
- President: Gerald Ford
- Preceded by: Diplomatic relations established
- Succeeded by: James Ward Hargrove

13th United States Ambassador to Australia
- In office June 8, 1973 – July 31, 1975
- President: Richard Nixon; Gerald Ford
- Preceded by: Walter L. Rice
- Succeeded by: James Ward Hargrove

10th Assistant Secretary of State for East Asian and Pacific Affairs
- In office May 5, 1969 – May 10, 1973
- President: Richard Nixon
- Preceded by: William Bundy
- Succeeded by: Robert S. Ingersoll

United States Ambassador to Indonesia
- In office June 4, 1965 – March 26, 1969
- President: Lyndon B. Johnson
- Preceded by: Howard P. Jones
- Succeeded by: Francis J. Galbraith

Personal details
- Born: January 27, 1916 Holyoke, Massachusetts, U.S.
- Died: June 6, 1998 (aged 82) Chevy Chase, Maryland, U.S.
- Spouse: Lispenard Crocker
- Children: 3
- Education: Yale University
- Profession: Diplomat

Marshall Green (January 27, 1916 – June 6, 1998) was an American diplomat whose career focused on East Asia. Green was the senior American diplomat in South Korea at the time of the 1960 April Revolution, and was United States Ambassador to Indonesia at the time of the Transition to the New Order. From 1969 to 1973, he was Assistant Secretary of State for East Asian and Pacific Affairs, and, in this capacity, accompanied President of the United States Richard Nixon during President Nixon's visit to China in 1972.

During the Indonesian mass killings of 1965–66, Green supplied lists of members of the Communist Party of Indonesia to the Indonesian Army which carried out the massacres.

== Biography ==
Marshall Green was born in Holyoke, Massachusetts on January 27, 1916. He was educated at Groton School, graduating in 1935, and then at Yale University, graduating in 1939.

After university, Green became the secretary of United States Ambassador to Japan, Joseph Grew in Tokyo. Shortly before the Attack on Pearl Harbor, Green returned to the United States to study for the exam to join the United States Foreign Service. With the entry of the U.S. into World War II, Green enlisted in the United States Navy, where he served as a Japanese language translator (he had learned Japanese during his time in Tokyo).

After the war, Green was discharged from the Navy and joined the Foreign Service. His first posting was as Third Secretary at the Embassy of the United States in Wellington. Over the next decade, Green rose rapidly through the ranks of the Foreign Service, ultimately becoming principal assistant to Secretary of State John Foster Dulles; he was Dulles' principal assistant at the time of the Second Taiwan Strait Crisis, which brought the United States and China to the brink of war.

Green was then appointed Deputy Chief of Mission at the Embassy of the United States in Seoul. He was the senior American diplomat chargé d'affaires in South Korea at the time of the 1961 coup d'état that brought Major-General Park Chung Hee to power. During this time, Green maintained the position that the U.S. continued to back ousted but democratically elected Prime Minister Chang Myon (John M. Chang). Green served as U.S. Consul General to Hong Kong, at the Consulate General of the United States in Hong Kong from November 1961 until August 1963.

President of the United States Lyndon B. Johnson nominated Green as United States Ambassador to Indonesia on June 4, 1965, and Green presented his credentials to the Indonesian government on July 26, 1965. He was met with an anti-Vietnam War protest organized by Sukarno, the President of Indonesia, under the slogan "Go Home, Green". Only weeks later, Green witnessed first hand the Transition to the New Order, an anti-communist purge in which Suharto led a coup against Sukarno following the murder of six generals by the 30 September Movement, which was blamed on the PKI by the Indonesian military based on dubious evidence. Green supported the Indonesian Army's version of the events, but contemporary historians have challenged it, with historian Geoffrey B. Robinson of UCLA in particular noting that Green and other US officials involved in supporting the Suharto coup "published memoirs and articles that sought to divert attention from any possible US role, while questioning the integrity and political loyalties of scholars who disagreed with them." An estimated 500,000 to one million Indonesians were killed in the massacres that followed. Recent revelations from government archives confirm that Green himself endorsed the Indonesian military "destroying PKI" through executions, noting in an October 20, 1965, telegram that he had "increasing respect for its determination and organization in carrying out this crucial assignment." According to Mark Aarons, he is "seen as one of the principal officials involved in encouraging the slaughter." Green was Ambassador to Indonesia until March 26, 1969; during his four years in Indonesia, he practiced what he called "low-profile diplomacy".

President Richard Nixon nominated Green as Assistant Secretary of State for East Asian and Pacific Affairs in 1969, and Green held this office from May 5, 1969, until May 10, 1973. He did most of the background work for President Nixon's visit to China in 1972, and he was one of thirteen State Department officials who accompanied Nixon during this trip.

In 1973, President Nixon selected Green as United States Ambassador to Australia, a post he held until 1975. He has been implicated in the dismissal of the Whitlam Government by Australia's Governor General, John Kerr. In 1975, he became Coordinator of Population Affairs in the United States Department of State.

== Later life and death ==
Green retired from government service in 1979, joining the board of Population Crisis Committee, a non-profit committed to combating overpopulation. In retirement, he wrote three books dealing with his time in East Asia.

Green died of a heart attack on June 6, 1998, at the age of 82. He was father to three sons: Marshall W., Edward C., and Brampton S., and husband to Lispenard Crocker Green (1924–1996).

== Works ==
- Indonesia: Crisis and Transformation, 1965-1968. Howells House. 1990. ISBN 9780929590028.
- Marshall Green, John H. Holdridge, William N. Stokes, War and peace with China, DACOR Press, 1994, ISBN 9781885965004
- Marshall Green, ‘’Pacific Encounters - recollections and humor’’, Dacor Press, 1997, ISBN 1-885965-02-8

Diplomatic posts
Preceded by Sam P. Gilstrap	United States Consul General Hong Kong and Macau; November 1961 – August 1963	Succeeded by Edward E. Rice
Preceded by Howard P. Jones	United States Ambassador to Indonesia; July 26, 1965 – March 26, 1969	Succeeded by Francis Joseph Galbraith
Preceded by Walter L. Rice	United States Ambassador to Australia; 1973 – 1975	Succeeded by James W. Hargrove
Government offices
Preceded by William Bundy	Assistant Secretary of State for East Asian and Pacific Affairs; May 5, 1969 – May 10, 1973	Succeeded by Robert S. Ingersoll
