= Ben Shearer =

Australian artist (born 1941)

Ben Shearer (born 1941 in Adelaide, South Australia) is an Australian artist who specializes in watercolor painting of the Outback.

== History ==
When Shearer was six years old, an injury during a game of cricket resulted in blindness of his right eye. He claims this accident as the reason he spent hours painting in school instead of playing sports. Shearer has also said he attributes his creativity and passion of art to his ancestors, John and David Shearer, inventors of the first steam-powered motor car. After finishing school, Shearer was awarded a Wool Research Fund Scholarship to the Gordon Institute of Technology in Geelong, Victoria and studied textiles. During this time, he lived at the Geelong Grammar School and met his future wife. Shearer attended post-graduate school at the Scottish Woollen Technical College in Galashiels, Scotland, where he studied fabric design and weaving. After graduate school, Shearer moved to Melbourne and worked as a carpet designer for 11 years. While living in Melbourne, his wife gave birth to their two sons Andrew and Tim.

During the next three decades, Shearer taught himself how to design clothes, weave, make tapestries, draw in pastels, and paint. In 1979, Shearer began his art teaching career at St. Catherine's College, located on the campus of the University of Western Australia in Perth. The next year, he began teaching at Scotch College in Melbourne for 14 years. In 1995, he began to focus exclusively on his artwork and now uses his home as a studio. Shearer starts with pencil drawings on French Arshes paper and then applies the paint. There are usually four to six watercolours being worked on at the same time, so that when he works on one painting, the others can dry.

In addition to his paintings of the Outback, Shearer's works include scenes of Red Cliffs on the Murray River, Katherine Gorge, Boulia, the De Grey River, and Kakadu National Park. His works have been displayed at galleries in Sydney, Canberra, and Melbourne, as well as the Embassy of Australia in Washington, D.C. He resides in Malvern, Victoria with his wife of 48 years, Caroline.
