= Jerome Klahr Huddle =

American diplomat

Jerome Klahr Huddle (March 25, 1891 – March 16, 1959), known as J. Klahr Huddle, was an American diplomat from Ohio. He served as United States Ambassador to Burma from October 1947 to November 1949. He was commissioned during a recess of the Senate on October 17, 1947, then recommissioned on December 9, 1947, after confirmation.

Diplomatic posts
Preceded by Earl L. Packer	U.S. Ambassador to Burma; 1947–1949	Succeeded by David McK. Key
