= Douglas M. Moffat =

7th United States Ambassador to Australia
- In office 1956
- President: Dwight D. Eisenhower
- Preceded by: Amos J. Peaslee
- Succeeded by: William J. Sebald

Personal details
- Born: November 16, 1881 New Jersey, U.S.
- Died: August 30, 1956 (aged 74) Sydney, Australia
- Education: Yale College (BA, MA); Harvard University

Douglas Maxwell Moffat (November 16, 1881 – August 30, 1956) was an American lawyer and diplomat who served briefly as the United States Ambassador to Australia in 1956. He had a career in both private practice and public service before entering diplomacy, which was cut short by his sudden death while in office.

== Early life and education ==
Douglas Moffat was born on November 16, 1881, in New Jersey.

== Diplomatic career ==
In February 1956, President Dwight D. Eisenhower appointed Moffat as United States Ambassador to Australia. He presented his credentials on March 27, 1956. He was the first U.S. ambassador to Australia to die in office.

== Death and legacy ==
Moffat died suddenly on August 30, 1956, in Sydney at the age of 74, making his ambassadorship notably short-lived. He was interred at the Memorial Cemetery of St. John’s Church in Laurel Hollow, New York.
