= David McK. Key =

American diplomat (1900–1988)

4th Assistant Secretary of State for International Organization Affairs
- In office December 18, 1953 – July 31, 1955
- President: Dwight Eisenhower
- Preceded by: Robert D. Murphy
- Succeeded by: Francis O. Wilcox

United States Ambassador to Burma
- In office April 1950 – October 1951
- President: Harry S. Truman
- Preceded by: J. Klahr Huddle
- Succeeded by: William J. Sebald

Personal details
- Born: February 4, 1900 Tennessee, U.S.
- Died: July 15, 1988 (aged 88)
- Education: Harvard College

David McKendree Key (February 4, 1900 – July 15, 1988) of Tennessee, a descendant of David M. Key, served as United States Ambassador to Burma from April 1950 to October 1951, and later as the Assistant Secretary of State for International Organization Affairs of the State Department. He graduated from Harvard College.

Diplomatic posts
Preceded by J. Klahr Huddle	U.S. Ambassador to Burma; April 26, 1950 – October 28, 1951	Succeeded by William J. Sebald
Government offices
Preceded by Robert Daniel Murphy	Assistant Secretary of State for International Organization Affairs; December 18, 1953 – July 31, 1955	Succeeded by Francis O. Wilcox
