= Philip H. Alston =

American lawyer and diplomat (1911–1988)

15th United States Ambassador to Australia
- In office 1977–1981
- President: Jimmy Carter
- Preceded by: James Ward Hargrove
- Succeeded by: Robert D. Nesen

Personal details
- Born: April 19, 1911 Atlanta, Georgia, US
- Died: March 2, 1988 (aged 76)
- Education: University of Georgia (BA); Emory University (JD)
- Occupation: Lawyer

Philip Henry Alston Jr. (April 19, 1911 – March 2, 1988) was an American lawyer and diplomat who served as U.S. Ambassador to Australia and Nauru.

== Biography ==
Alston was born in Atlanta, Georgia, on April 19, 1911 to attorney Philip H. Alston Sr. (1880–1962) and May Lewis Alston (1890–1962).

He was educated at Episcopal High School in Alexandria, Virginia. He received a bachelor's degree from the University of Georgia in 1932, and earned a Juris Doctor degree from Emory University in 1934. Upon completion of law school, Alston began practicing at the law firm that would become Alston, Miller and Gaines, where he became a partner in 1942.

From 1942–1945, Alston served in the United States Navy, and returned to his legal practice following the end of World War II.

Alston was a confidant of U.S. President Jimmy Carter, and began supporting Carter politically in 1966. In 1976, Alston was chairman of Jimmy Carter's presidential campaign committee. Carter appointed him ambassador to Australia and Nauru in 1977 and 1979, respectively. He served in those roles until 1981.

Following his diplomatic appointments, Alston was a co-founder of the Georgia Foundation, raising millions of dollars for the University of Georgia.

Diplomatic posts
Preceded by James W. Hargrove	United States Ambassador to Australia; 1977–1981	Succeeded by Robert D. Nesen
Preceded by James W. Hargrove	United States Ambassador to Nauru; 1979–1981	Succeeded by Robert D. Nesen
