= Australian Seal =

Sculpture in Washington, D.C., U.S.

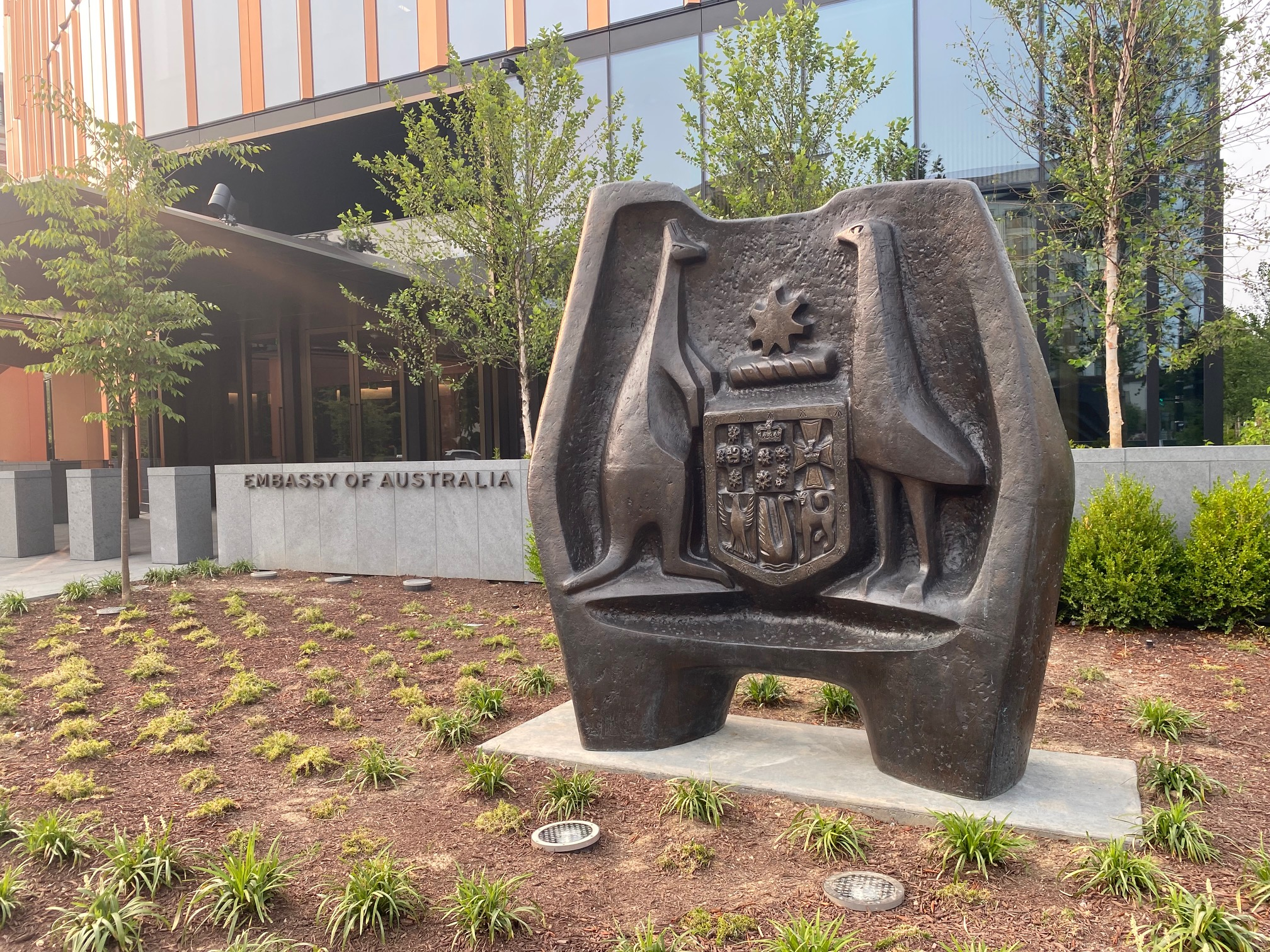
- The sculpture outside the Embassy of Australia in Washington, D.C. in 2023
- Artist: Thomas Bass
- Type: Sculpture
- Dimensions: 2.4 m × 1.5 m × 0.61 m (8 ft × 5 ft × 2 ft)
- Location: Washington, D.C., U.S.; 38°54′27.7″N 77°2′12.9″W

Australian Seal is an outdoor sculpture of 1968–69 by Thomas Bass, installed outside the Embassy of Australia, Washington, D.C., in the United States. The bronze sculpture measures approximately 8 feet (2.4 m) x 5 feet (1.5 m) x 2 feet (0.61 m) and is set on a flagstone base. It depicts an artistic rendition of the Australian coat of arms: a kangaroo and emu, supporting a shield, which includes six quarters representing the states. Above the shield is a seven-pointed star.

== See also ==
- 1969 in art
- Australia–United States relations
- List of public art in Washington, D.C., Ward 2
