= Frank Lockhart (diplomat) =

American diplomat (1881–1949)

Frank P. Lockhart
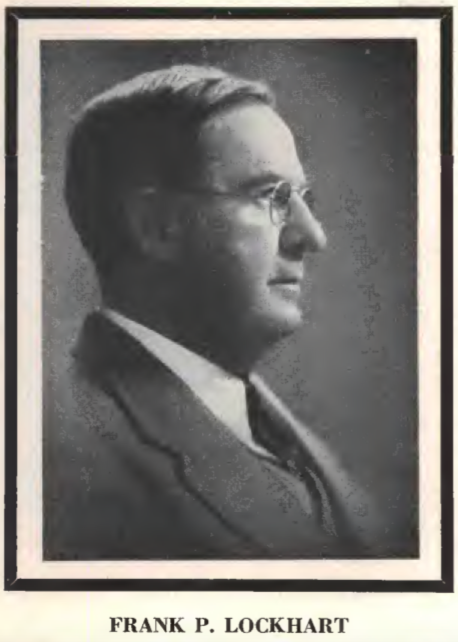

Consul General of the United States, Shanghai
- In office 1940–1941
- Preceded by: Clarence E. Gauss
- Succeeded by: Monnett B. Davis

Personal details
- Born: April 8, 1881 Pittsburg, Texas, U.S.
- Died: August 25, 1949 (aged 68) Washington, D.C., U.S.
- Education: Grayson College

Frank Pruitt Lockhart (April 8, 1881 – August 25, 1949) was an American diplomat who served for many years in China.

== Early life ==
Lockhart was born April 8, 1881, in Pittsburg, Texas.

He attended Grayson College. Following graduation he first worked as a newspaper editor in Texas. After two years, he moved to Washington, D.C., where he worked as a private secretary to Morris Sheppard, then serving as a member of the United States Senate.

== Diplomatic career ==
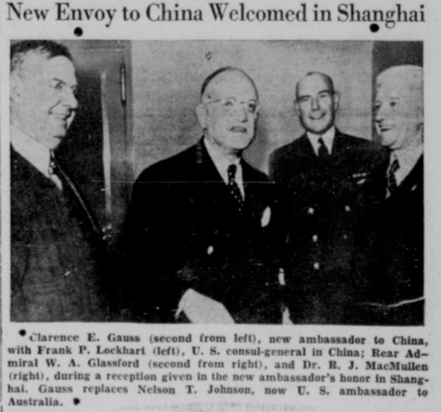
Lockhart, Clarence E. Gauss, Admiral William A. Glassford and RJ McMullen in Shanghai 1941

In 1914, Lockhart joined the United States Department of State as assistant chief of the Division of Far Eastern Affairs, eventually rising to chief of the division. He was involved in the Washington Naval Conference on arms control. In 1925, he was appointed U.S. Consul-General in Hankou. and between 1931 and 1933, was U.S. Consul-General in Tianjin. In 1933, he was transferred to the U.S. Embassy in Peiping as Counsellor. Lockhart was appointed Consul-General in Shanghai, in 1939 serving until December 7, 1941, when the Consulate was occupied at the beginning of the Pacific War. He was interned until he was repatriated in mid-1942 on the MS Gripsholm.

In October 1942, he became chief of the Office of Philippine Affairs and promoted to the chief of the Division of Philippine Affairs in Jan 1944 until his retirement in 1946. He subsequently joined the American Foreign Service Association, serving as a director and business manager of the Foreign Service Journal.

== Family ==
Lockhart married Ruby Hess in 1904. They had a son, Frank Pruitt Lochhart Jr. and a daughter, Maurine.

== Death ==
Lockhart died on August 25, 1949, at the George Washington University Hospital in Washington, D.C.
