= Robert Butler (diplomat) =

American diplomat

The Honourable Robert Butler

3rd United States Ambassador to Australia
- In office 1946–1948
- President: Harry S. Truman
- Preceded by: Nelson T. Johnson
- Succeeded by: Myron M. Cowen

United States Ambassador to Cuba
- In office 1948–1951
- President: Harry S. Truman
- Preceded by: Raymond Henry Norweb
- Succeeded by: Willard L. Beaulac

Personal details
- Born: 1897 St. Paul, Minnesota, U.S.
- Died: September 15, 1955 New York City, U.S.
- Party: Democrat
- Spouse: Margaret Porter
- Children: 4 (Walter, Margaret, Catherine, Jean)
- Profession: Construction and Shipbuilding

Robert Butler (1897-1955) was the United States Ambassador to Australia (1946–48) and Cuba (1948–1951). He died of a heart attack on September 15, 1955. Butler was born in St. Paul, Minnesota and his wife was Margaret Porter.

During World War II he was active in shipbuilding. He was the president of Walter Butler Shipbuilders Inc. and Walter Butler Shipbuilding-Duluth which built a number of cargo ships in Duluth, Minnesota and Superior, Wisconsin during the war.

According to a former aide, Butler had been the focus of an assassination plot during his term as Ambassador to Cuba.

A large statue of Cuban independence leader Jose Marti inside City Hall in St. Paul, Minnesota, was presented to the city "in appreciation of [Butler's] courageous work in creating a warm feeling between our two countries."

Diplomatic posts
Preceded by Nelson T. Johnson	United States Ambassador to Australia; 1946–1948	Succeeded by Myron M. Cowen
Preceded by Raymond Henry Norweb	United States Ambassador to Cuba; 1948–1951	Succeeded by Willard L. Beaulac
