= Clarence E. Gauss =

American diplomat

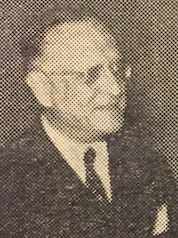

United States Ambassador to the Republic of China
- In office May 26, 1941 – November 14, 1944
- President: Franklin D. Roosevelt
- Preceded by: Nelson T. Johnson
- Succeeded by: Patrick Hurley

1st United States Minister to Australia
- In office July 17, 1940 – March 5, 1941
- President: Franklin D. Roosevelt
- Preceded by: Diplomatic relations established
- Succeeded by: Nelson T. Johnson

Consul General of the United States, Shanghai
- In office 1935–1940
- President: Franklin D. Roosevelt
- Preceded by: Monnett Bain Davis
- Succeeded by: Frank P. Lockhart

Personal details
- Born: Clarence Edward Gauss; January 12, 1887 Washington D.C.
- Died: April 8, 1960 (aged 73) Los Angeles
- Party: Republican

Clarence Edward Gauss (January 12, 1887 – April 8, 1960) was an American diplomat.

== Personal background ==
Gauss was born in Washington, D.C., as the son of Herman Gauss and Emile J. (Eisenman) Gauss. He married Rebecca Louise Barker in 1917. He was a Republican and a Protestant.

== Diplomatic career ==
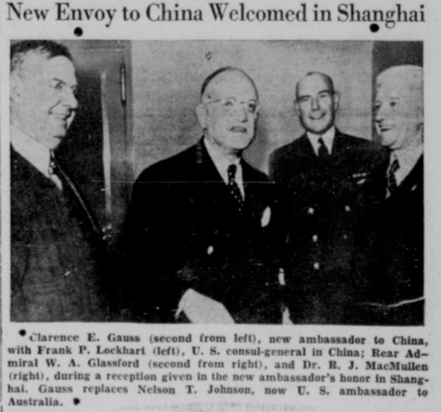
Frank P Lockhart, Gauss, Admiral William A. Glassford and RJ McMullen in Shanghai 1941

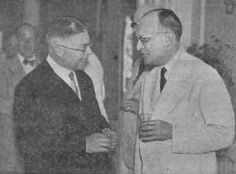
British Judge Sir Allan Mossop and Gauss in Shanghai in 1939

Gauss was a career Foreign Service Officer for the United States Foreign Service. He was posted as U.S. Vice Consul in Shanghai, 1912–15; U.S. Consul in Shanghai, 1916; Amoy, 1916–20; Jinan, 1920–23; U.S. Consul General in Mukden, 1923–24; Jinan, 1924–26; Shanghai, 1926–27 (acting), 1935–38; Tianjin, 1927–31; Paris, 1935; Shanghai, 1935-1940. From 1940-41 he served as U.S. Minister to Australia, and was the United States ambassador to the Republic of China during the Second World War. He resigned from the post in November 1944, and was replaced by Patrick Hurley.

=== Chronology ===
U.S. Vice Consul

- Shanghai, 1912–15

U.S. Consul

- Shanghai, 1916
- Amoy (now Xiamen), 1916–20
- Jinan, 1920–23

U.S. Consul General

- Mukden (now Shenyang), 1923–24
- Jinan, 1924–26
- Shanghai, 1926–27 (acting), 1935–38
- Tianjin, 1927–31
- Paris, 1935
- Shanghai, 1935-1940

U.S. Minister

- Australia, 1940-1941

U.S. Ambassador

- China, 1941-1944

== Later life ==
After leaving diplomatic service, Gauss was director of the Export–Import Bank of the United States. He died at Good Samaritan Hospital in Los Angeles on April 8, 1960.

Diplomatic posts
Preceded by Nelson T. Johnson	US Ambassador to China; 1941–1944	Succeeded by Patrick Hurley
Preceded by first incumbent	U.S. Ambassador to Australia; 1940–1941	Succeeded by Nelson T. Johnson
