= Robert Daniel Murphy =

American diplomat (1894–1978)

Robert Murphy
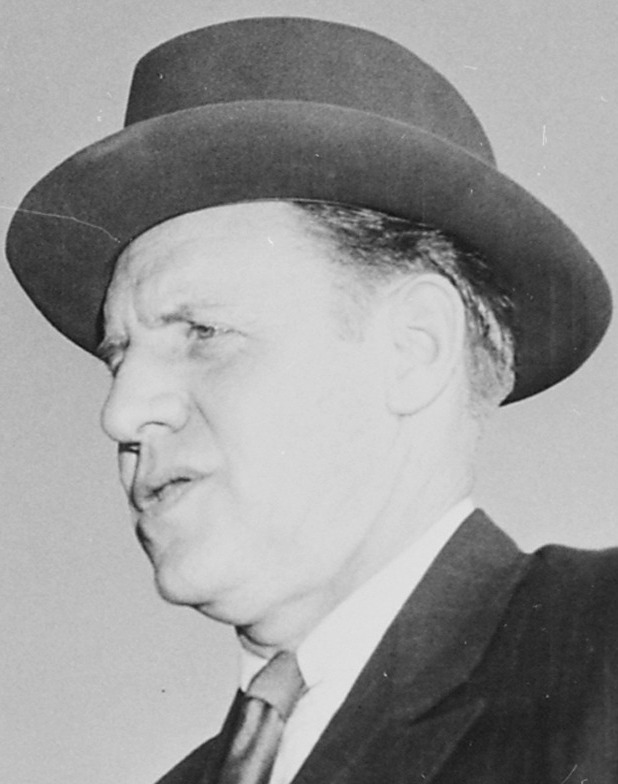

Chair of the Intelligence Oversight Board
- In office March 11, 1976 – May 5, 1977
- President: Gerald Ford; Jimmy Carter
- Preceded by: Position established
- Succeeded by: Thomas L. Farmer

1st Under Secretary of State for Political Affairs
- In office August 14, 1959 – December 3, 1959
- President: Dwight Eisenhower
- Preceded by: Position established
- Succeeded by: Livingston Merchant

3rd Assistant Secretary of State for International Organization Affairs
- In office July 28, 1953 – November 30, 1953
- President: Dwight Eisenhower
- Preceded by: John Hickerson
- Succeeded by: David Key

United States Ambassador to Japan
- In office May 9, 1952 – April 28, 1953
- President: Harry Truman; Dwight Eisenhower
- Preceded by: Joseph Grew
- Succeeded by: John Allison

United States Ambassador to Belgium
- In office November 29, 1949 – March 19, 1952
- President: Harry Truman
- Preceded by: Alan Kirk
- Succeeded by: Myron Cowen

Personal details
- Born: October 28, 1894 Milwaukee, Wisconsin, U.S.
- Died: January 9, 1978 (aged 83) New York City, New York, U.S.
- Spouse(s): Mildred Claire Taylor (m. 1921; d. 1974)
- Children: 3, including Rosemary
- Education: Marquette University (BA); George Washington University (LLB, LLM)
- Awards: President's Award for Distinguished Federal Civilian Service (1959); Distinguished Service Medal; Croix de Guerre; Order of the Rising Sun; Order of Leopold (Belgium); Order of Isabella the Catholic; National Security Medal

Robert Daniel Murphy (October 28, 1894 – January 9, 1978) was an American diplomat. He served as the first United States Under Secretary of State for Political Affairs when the position was established during the Eisenhower administration.

== Early life and career ==
Born in Milwaukee, Wisconsin, Murphy began his federal career at the United States Post Office (1916) and moved to be cipher clerk at the American Legation in Bern, Switzerland (1917). He was admitted to the US Foreign Service in 1921. Among the several posts that he held were Vice-Consul in Zürich and Munich, consul in Seville, consul in Paris from 1930 to 1936, and chargé d'affaires to the Vichy government. He was also the one-time State Department specialist on France.

== World War II ==
In February 1941, Murphy negotiated the Murphy-Weygand Agreement, which allowed the United States to export to French North Africa in spite of the British blockade and trade restrictions against the Vichy-governed area.

In autumn of 1942, at President Franklin Roosevelt's behest, Murphy investigated conditions in French North Africa in preparation for the Allied landings, Operation Torch, the first major Western Allied ground offensive during World War II. He was appointed the President's personal representative with the rank of Minister to French North Africa. Murphy made contact with various French army officers in Algiers and recruited them to support the Allies when the invasion of French North Africa came. During this time, Kenneth Pendar served as his second.

Prior to the November 8 invasion, Murphy, along with U.S. General Mark W. Clark, had worked to gain the cooperation of French General Henri Giraud for the attack. The Americans and British hoped to place Giraud in charge of all French forces in North Africa and command them for the Allied cause. Giraud, however, mistakenly believed that he was to assume command of all Allied forces in North Africa, which put Murphy's diplomatic skills to the test to keep Giraud on board.

Murphy and Clark jointly convinced the French in North Africa to accept Admiral François Darlan, the commander of all French military Forces loyal to the Vichy regime and coincidentally in Algiers, as the highest authority in French North Africa and Giraud as Commander of all French military in North Africa. Murphy used his friendly contacts with the French in North Africa to gain their co-operation in re-entering the war against the Axis. He also needed all his diplomatic skills to steer Clark away from confrontation with the French, especially Darlan. When Darlan was assassinated in late December, an irritant to good relations was removed.

Keeping the French united and aligned with the Allies into 1943 taxed Murphy's skills to their limit. He gained a powerful ally in British politician (and future Prime Minister) Harold Macmillan, also posted to Algiers in January 1943. The two diplomats worked together amiably to ensure that the Casablanca Conference went smoothly in January 1943 and that Giraud and de Gaulle would join forces to unite the French among the Allies. Keeping the quarrelsome French united and working with the Americans and British exasperated and exhausted Murphy. When Eisenhower needed a civilian from the State Department to assume a similar role in Italy in 1943, Murphy gladly accepted it and left Algiers behind.

== Later career ==
- 1948 advisor for General Lucius D. Clay, American military governor of American-occupied Germany, during the Soviet Russian Blockade of Berlin, and the Berlin Airlift, "Operation Vittles"
- 1949 Ambassador Extraordinary and Plenipotentiary, Belgium
- 1952 Ambassador Extraordinary and Plenipotentiary, Japan (first American ambassador to Japan after World War II)
- 1953 Assistant Secretary for United Nations Affairs
- 1953 Deputy Under Secretary for Political Affairs (Assistant Secretary)
- 1955 Deputy Under Secretary for Political Affairs
- 1956 Career Ambassador
- 1958 Personal representative of President Dwight D. Eisenhower during the 1958 Lebanon crisis
- 1959 Under Secretary of State for Political Affairs
- 1959 Head of International Operations, Corning Glass Works

== Later life ==
Murphy retired from the State Department in December 1959 but became an adviser to Presidents John F. Kennedy, Lyndon B. Johnson, and Richard Nixon. He served on President Gerald Ford's Foreign Intelligence Advisory Board.

He was a member of the Steering Committee of the Bilderberg Group.

In 2006, Murphy was featured on a United States postage stamp, one of a block of six featuring prominent diplomats.

== Works ==
- The Bases of Peace, [Washington] United States Department of State, 1958
- Diplomat among Warriors, [1st ed.], Garden City, N.Y., Doubleday, 1964.
- Murphy e l'operazione torch, Salvatore Trovato Gangemi, Edizioni Nuova Cultura, Roma 2023.

== Sources ==
- Langer, William L. (1947). Our Vichy Gamble.
- Brands, H. W. (1988). Cold Warriors: Eisenhower's Generation and American Foreign Policy.
- "Editorial, "Gentleman and Diplomat"" (PDF). Foreign Service Journal. January 1960.
- Murphy, Robert (March 1954). "Remarks of The Honorable Robert Murphy" (PDF). Foreign Service Journal.
- Murphy, Robert (May 1952). "The Soldier and the Diplomat" (PDF). Foreign Service Journal.
- Pendar, Kenneth (1976). Adventure in Diplomacy: Our French Dilemma. New York: Da Capo Press.
- Mast, Général Charles (1969). Histoire d'une Rébellion, Alger, 8 novembre 1942. Paris: Plon.
- Juin, Alphonse (1959). Mémoires. Paris: A. Fayard.

Diplomatic posts
Preceded by Alan Kirk	United States Ambassador to Belgium; 1949–1952	Succeeded by Myron Cowen
Preceded by Joseph Grew	United States Ambassador to Japan; 1952–1953	Succeeded by John Allison
Political offices
Preceded by John Hickerson	Assistant Secretary of State for International Organization Affairs; 1953	Succeeded by David Key
New office	Under Secretary of State for Political Affairs; 1959	Succeeded by Livingston Merchant
Awards
Preceded by Omar Bradley	Recipient of the Sylvanus Thayer Award; 1974	Succeeded by Averell Harriman
Government offices
New office	Chair of the Intelligence Oversight Board; 1976–1976	Succeeded by Thomas Farmer
