= James W. Hargrove =

American diplomat (1922–2004)

James Ward Hargrove

14th United States Ambassador to Australia
- In office 1976–1977
- President: Gerald Ford
- Preceded by: Marshall Green
- Succeeded by: Philip H. Alston

United States Ambassador to Nauru
- President: Gerald Ford

Personal details
- Born: October 31, 1922 Shreveport, Louisiana
- Died: July 25, 2004 (aged 81) Houston, Texas
- Education: Rice University
- Occupation: Diplomat, Businessman, USPS Executive

James Ward Hargrove (October 31, 1922 – July 25, 2004) was an American diplomat, businessman and United States Postal Service executive. He served as U.S. Ambassador to Australia and Nauru under President Gerald Ford.

Hargrove was born in Shreveport, Louisiana on October 31, 1922. He grew up in Houston and attended the local public schools before attending Sewanee Military Academy in Tennessee, where he was second in command of the Corps of Cadets. He continued his education at Rice University, majored in philosophy, worked as editor of the Thresher, and was named to Phi Beta Kappa.

After serving in the Army during World War II, he began what was to be a 22-year career with the Texas Eastern Corporation. One source called it the Texas Eastern Transmission Corp. and said it was a pipeline firm that his father, Reginald H. Hargrove, helped found. Hargrove was Senior Vice President of Finance and Director when he left in 1969 to become in 1969 to become Assistant Postmaster General for Finance. He was considered “He was instrumental in the reorganization of the Post Office Department into the semi-autonomous US Postal Service, in which he held the post of Senior Assistant Postmaster General for Support Services.”. He accomplished this through his roles with the 1970 Postal Reorganization Act.

In 1976, he served concurrent appointments as Ambassador to Australia and Nauru until March 1977. When he returned to Houston, he worked the investment management firm Vaughan, Nelson and Boston, later renamed Vaughan, Nelson and Hargrove and remained with them as a Chartered Financial Analyst until his retirement in 1985.

Hargrove died from complications of diabetes in Houston, Texas, on July 25, 2004, at the age of 81.
