= Francis O. Wilcox =

U.S. State Department official

5th Assistant Secretary of State for International Organization Affairs
- In office September 6, 1955 – January 20, 1961
- President: Dwight D. Eisenhower
- Preceded by: David McK. Key
- Succeeded by: Harlan Cleveland

Personal details
- Born: April 9, 1908 Columbus Junction, Iowa, U.S.
- Died: February 20, 1985
- Spouse: Virginia
- Children: 2 (at least)
- Education: University of Iowa (AB, AM, PhD); University of Geneva

Francis Orlando Wilcox (April 9, 1908 – February 20, 1985) was an official in the United States Department of State.

== Biography ==
Francis O. Wilcox was born in Columbus Junction, Iowa on April 9, 1908. He was educated at the University of Iowa, receiving his A.B. in 1930, his A.M. in 1931, and his Ph.D. in 1933. He then attended the University of Geneva and the Graduate Institute of International Studies, and received a doctorate in political science in 1935. From 1935 through 1941, he taught political science at the University of Iowa, the University of Louisville, the University of Chicago, and the University of Michigan.

Wilcox joined the United States Department of State in 1942. From 1947 through 1951, he was the first chief of staff of the United States Senate Committee on Foreign Relations. During this time, the Committee oversaw the United States' involvement in the creation of NATO and the Marshall Plan.

In 1955, President of the United States Dwight D. Eisenhower nominated Wilcox as Assistant Secretary of State for International Organization Affairs and, after Senate confirmation, Wilcox served in this office from September 6, 1955, through January 20, 1961. In this capacity, he had primary responsibility for United States involvement in the United Nations.

Leaving government service in 1961, Wilcox became dean of the Johns Hopkins University's School of Advanced International Studies. He became dean emeritus in 1973.

Wilcox died of a heart attack on February 20, 1985. He was survived by his wife, Virginia, two children and two granddaughters.

Government offices
Preceded by David McK. Key	Assistant Secretary of State for International Organization Affairs; September 6, 1955 – January 20, 1961	Succeeded by Harlan Cleveland
