= Financial Crisis Inquiry Commission =

American commission that investigated the causes of the 2008 financial crisis

History
- Status: Defunct
- Established by: Barack Obama on May 20, 2009
- Disbanded: February 13, 2011

Membership
- Chairperson: Phil Angelides
- Other committee members: Bill Thomas (Vice Chair), Brooksley Born, Byron Georgiou, Bob Graham, Keith Hennessey, Douglas Holtz-Eakin, Heather Murren, John W. Thompson, Peter J. Wallison

Jurisdiction
- Purpose: Investigate the financial and economic causes of the Great Recession and global financial crisis.
- Policy areas: Financial regulation, housing market, systemic economic risk

Summary
- Concluded that the crisis was avoidable and caused by widespread failures in financial regulation and corporate governance.

The Financial Crisis Inquiry Commission (FCIC) was established in 2010 in the United States to investigate the causes of the 2008 financial crisis. The commission, led by Phil Angelides, held public hearings, gathered testimony from hundreds, and released its report in January 2011.

The report concluded that "the collapse of the housing bubble—fueled by low interest rates, easy and available credit, scant regulation, and toxic mortgages—that was the spark that ignited" events leading to the financial crisis.

The commission was explicit in its concerns about insurance giant American International Group, financial giants Bear Stearns and Lehman Brothers, and mortgage giants Fannie Mae and Freddie Mac, each of which the government brought under consideration for financial rescue.

== Creation and statutory mandate ==
The commission has been nicknamed the Angelides Commission after its chairman Phil Angelides. The commission has been compared to the Pecora Commission, which investigated the causes of the Great Depression in the 1930s, and has been nicknamed the New Pecora Commission. Analogies have also been made to the 9/11 Commission, which examined the September 11 attacks. The commission had the ability to subpoena documents and witnesses for testimony, a power that the Pecora Commission had but the 9/11 Commission did not. The first public hearing of the commission was held on January 13, 2010, with the presentation of testimony from various banking officials. Hearings continued during 2010 with "hundreds" of other persons in business, academia, and government testifying.

The commission was created by section 5 of the Fraud Enforcement and Recovery Act of 2009 (Public Law 111–21), signed into law by President Barack Obama on May 20, 2009. That section of the Act:

- Set the purpose of the commission, i.e., "to examine the causes, domestic and global, of the current financial and economic crisis in the United States."
- Set its composition of 10 members, appointed on a bipartisan and bicameral basis in consultation with relevant Committees. Six members are to be chosen by the congressional majority, the Democrats (three of these by the Speaker of the House and three by the Senate Majority Leader) and four by the congressional minority, the Republicans (two from the House Minority Leader and two from the Senate Minority Leader).
- Expressed the "sense of the Congress that individuals appointed to the Commission should be prominent United States citizens with national recognition and significant depth of experience in such fields as banking, regulation of markets, taxation, finance, economics, consumer protection, and housing" and also provided that "no member of Congress or officer or employee of the federal government or any state or local government may serve as a member of the Commission."
- Provided that Commission's chair be selected jointly by the congressional majority leadership and that the vice chair be selected jointly by the congressional minority leadership, and that the chair and vice chair may not be from the same political party.
- Set the "functions of the Commission" as:

To examine the causes of the current financial and economic crisis in the United States, specifically the role of

(A) fraud and abuse in the financial sector, including fraud and abuse towards consumers in the mortgage sector;
(B) Federal and State financial regulators, including the extent to which they enforced, or failed to enforce statutory, regulatory, or supervisory requirements;
(C) the global imbalance of savings, international capital flows, and fiscal imbalances of various governments;
(D) monetary policy and the availability and terms of credit;
(E) accounting practices, including, mark-to-market and fair value rules, and treatment of off-balance sheet vehicles;
(F) tax treatment of financial products and investments;
(G) capital requirements and regulations on leverage and liquidity, including the capital structures of regulated and non-regulated financial entities;
(H) credit rating agencies in the financial system, including reliance on credit ratings by financial institutions and federal financial regulators, the use of credit ratings in financial regulation, and the use of credit ratings in the securitization markets;
(I) lending practices and securitization, including the originate-to-distribute model for extending credit and transferring risk;
(J) affiliations between insured depository institutions and securities, insurance, and other types of nonbank companies;
(K) the concept that certain institutions are 'too-big-to-fail' and its impact on market expectations;
(L) corporate governance, including the impact of company conversions from partnerships to corporations;
(M) compensation structures;
(N) changes in compensation for employees of financial companies, as compared to compensation for others with similar skill sets in the labor market;
(O) the legal and regulatory structure of the United States housing market;
(P) derivatives and unregulated financial products and practices, including credit default swaps;
(Q) short-selling;
(R) financial-institution reliance on numerical models, including risk models and credit ratings;
(S) the legal and regulatory structure governing financial institutions, including the extent to which the structure creates the opportunity for financial institutions to engage in regulatory arbitrage;
(T) the legal and regulatory structure governing investor and mortgagor protection;
(U) financial institutions and government-sponsored enterprises; and
(V) the quality of due diligence undertaken by financial institutions;

(2) to examine the causes of the collapse of each major financial institution that failed (including institutions that were acquired to prevent their failure) or was likely to have failed if not for the receipt of exceptional Government assistance from the Secretary of the Treasury during the period beginning in August 2007 through April 2009;
(3) to submit a report under subsection (h);
(4) to refer to the Attorney General of the United States and any appropriate State attorney general any person that the Commission finds may have violated the laws of the United States in relation to such crisis; and

(5) to build upon the work of other entities, and avoid unnecessary duplication, by reviewing the record of the Committee on Banking, Housing, and Urban Affairs of the Senate, the Committee on Financial Services of the House of Representatives, other congressional committees, the Government Accountability Office, other legislative panels, and any other department, agency, bureau, board, commission, office, independent establishment, or instrumentality of the United States (to the fullest extent permitted by law) with respect to the current financial and economic crisis.

- Authorized the commission to "hold hearings, sit and act at times and places, take testimony, receive evidence, and administer oaths" and "require, by subpoena or otherwise, the attendance and testimony of witnesses and the production of books, records, correspondence, memoranda, papers, and documents." This subpoena power was also held by the Pecora Commission, but not the 9/11 Commission.
- Provided that "a report containing the findings and conclusions of the Commission" shall be submitted to the President and to the Congress on December 15, 2010, and that at the discretion of the chairperson of the commission, the report may include reports or specific findings on any financial institution examined by the commission.
- Provides that the chairperson of the Commission shall, not later than 120 days after the date of submission of the final report, appear before the Senate Banking Committee and the House Financial Services Committee to testify regarding the commission's findings.
- Provides for the termination of the Commission 60 days after the submission of the final report.

== Composition ==
Speaker of the House Nancy Pelosi of California and Senate Majority Leader Harry Reid of Nevada (both Democrats) each made three appointments, while House Minority Leader John Boehner of Ohio and Senate Minority Leader Mitch McConnell of Kentucky (both Republicans) each made two appointments:

- Phil Angelides (chairman) – jointly chosen as chair by Pelosi and Reid
- Bill Thomas (vice chairman) – jointly chosen as vice chair by Boehner and McConnell
- Brooksley Born (Pelosi)
- Byron Georgiou (Reid)
- Bob Graham (Reid)
- Keith Hennessey (McConnell)
- Douglas Holtz-Eakin (McConnell)
- Heather Murren (Reid)
- John W. Thompson (Pelosi)
- Peter J. Wallison (Boehner)

== Commission's investigation and public response ==
As part of its inquiry, the commission held a series of public hearings throughout 2010 including, but not limited to, the following topics: avoiding future catastrophe, complex financial derivatives, credit rating agencies, excess risk and financial speculation, government-sponsored enterprises, the shadow banking system, subprime lending practices and securitization, and too big to fail.

The first meeting of the Commission took place in Washington on September 17, 2009, and consisted of opening remarks by Commissioners.

On January 13, 2010, Lloyd Blankfein testified before the commission, that he considered Goldman Sachs' role as primarily that of a market maker, not a creator of the product (i.e.; subprime mortgage-related securities). Goldman Sachs was sued on April 16, 2010, by the SEC for the fraudulent selling of collateralized debt obligations tied to subprime mortgages, a product which Goldman Sachs had created.

February 26–27 the Commission heard from academic experts and economists on issues related to the crisis. The following experts have appeared before the Commission in public or in private: Martin Baily, Markus Brunnermeier, John Geanakoplos, Pierre-Olivier Gourinchas, Gary Gorton, Dwight Jaffee, Simon Johnson, Anil Kashyap, Randall Kroszner, Annamaria Lusardi, Chris Mayer, David Moss, Carmen M. Reinhart, Kenneth T. Rosen, Hal S. Scott, Joseph E. Stiglitz, John B. Taylor, Mark Zandi and Luigi Zingales.

April 7–9, 2010, Alan Greenspan, Chuck Prince and Robert Rubin testified before the commission on subprime lending and securitization.

May 5–6, former Bear Stearns CEO Jimmy Cayne, former SEC Chairman Christopher Cox, Tim Geithner and Hank Paulson were scheduled to appear before the commission.

Writer Joe Nocera of The New York Times praised the commission's approach and technical expertise in understanding complex financial issues during July 2010.

On July 27, The composition of the commission's staff changed several times since its formation. The executive director J. Thomas Greene was replaced by Wendy M. Edelberg, an economist from the Federal Reserve. Five of the initial fourteen senior staff members resigned, including Matt Cooper, a journalist who was writing the report. Darrell Issa, a top Republican on the House Oversight and Government Reform Committee, questioned the Federal Reserve's involvement as a possible conflict of interest, and there has been disagreement among some commission members on what information to make public and where to place blame. Mr. Angelides called the criticisms "silly, stupid Washington stuff," adding: "I don't know what Mr. Issa's agenda is, but I can tell you what ours is." In a joint interview the commission's chairman, Phil Angelides (D), and vice chairman, Bill Thomas (R), said that the turnover's effects had been exaggerated and that they were optimistic about a consensus.

== Report ==
The Commission reported its findings in January 2011. In briefly summarizing its main conclusions the Commission stated: "While the vulnerabilities that created the potential for crisis were years in the making, it was the collapse of the housing bubble—fueled by low interest rates, easy and available credit, scant regulation, and toxic mortgages—that was the spark that ignited a string of events, which led to a full-blown crisis in the fall of 2008. Trillions of dollars in risky mortgages had become embedded throughout the financial system, as mortgage-related securities were packaged, repackaged, and sold to investors around the world. When the bubble burst, hundreds of billions of dollars in losses in mortgages and mortgage-related securities shook markets as well as financial institutions that had significant exposures to those mortgages and had borrowed heavily against them. This happened not just in the United States but around the world. The losses were magnified by derivatives such as synthetic securities."

The commission's final report was initially due to Congress on December 15, 2010, but was not released until January 27, 2011. In voting on the adoption of the final report the commission was split evenly along partisan lines, with Angelides, Born, Georgiou, Graham, Murren, and Thompson (appointed by Democrats Pelosi and Reid) all voting in favor and Thomas, Hennessey, Holtz-Eakin, and Wallison (appointed by Republicans Boehner and McConnell) all dissenting. Among those dissenting Thomas, Hennessey, and Holtz-Eakin collaborated on a single report while Wallison, from the American Enterprise Institute drafted his alone and proposed that the crisis was caused by government affordable housing policies rather than market forces. However, this view has not been supported by subsequent detailed analyses of mortgage market data.

The Commission reached nine main conclusions (directly quoted):

- We conclude this financial crisis was avoidable.

"There was an explosion in risky subprime lending and securitization, an unsustainable rise in housing prices, widespread reports of egregious and predatory lending practices, dramatic increases in household mortgage debt, and exponential growth in financial firms' trading activities, unregulated derivatives, and short-term "repo" lending markets, among many other red flags. Yet there was pervasive permissiveness; little meaningful action was taken to quell the threats in a timely manner." The Commission especially singles out the Fed's "failure to stem the flow of toxic mortgages."

- We conclude widespread failures in financial regulation and supervision proved devastating to the stability of the nation's financial markets.

"More than 30 years of deregulation and reliance on self-regulation by financial institutions, championed by former Federal Reserve chairman Alan Greenspan and others, supported by successive administrations and Congresses, and actively pushed by the powerful financial industry at every turn, had stripped away key safeguards, which could have helped avoid catastrophe. This approach had opened up gaps in oversight of critical areas with trillions of dollars at risk, such as the shadow banking system and over-the-counter derivatives markets. In addition, the government permitted financial firms to pick their preferred regulators in what became a race to the weakest supervisor."

- We conclude dramatic failures of corporate governance and risk management at many systemically important financial institutions were a key cause of this crisis.

"Too many of these institutions acted recklessly, taking on too much risk, with too little capital, and with too much dependence on short-term funding. ... [Large investment banks and bank holding companies] took on enormous exposures in acquiring and supporting subprime lenders and creating, packaging, repackaging, and selling trillions of dollars in mortgage-related securities, including synthetic financial products." The report goes on to fault "poorly executed acquisition and integration strategies that made effective management more challenging," narrow emphasis on mathematical models of risk as opposed to actual risk, and short-sighted compensation systems at all levels.

- We conclude a combination of excessive borrowing, risky investments, and lack of transparency put the financial system on a collision course with crisis.

"In the years leading up to the crisis, too many financial institutions, as well as too many households, borrowed to the hilt. ... [A]s of 2007, the leverage ratios [of the five major investment banks] were as high as 40 to 1, meaning for every $40 in assets, there was only $1 in capital to cover losses. Less than a 3% drop in asset values could wipe out a firm. To make matters worse, much of their borrowing was short-term, in the overnight market—meaning the borrowing had to be renewed each and every day. ... And the leverage was often hidden—in derivatives positions, in off-balance-sheet entities, and through "window dressing" of financial reports available to the investing public. ... The heavy debt taken on by some financial institutions was exacerbated by the risky assets they were acquiring with that debt. As the mortgage and real estate markets churned out riskier and riskier loans and securities, many financial institutions loaded up on them."

- We conclude the government was ill-prepared for the crisis, and its inconsistent response added to the uncertainty and panic in the financial markets.

"[K]ey policy makers ... were hampered because they did not have a clear grasp of the financial system they were charged with overseeing, particularly as it had evolved in the years leading up to the crisis. This was in no small measure due to the lack of transparency in key markets. They thought risk had been diversified when, in fact, it had been concentrated. ... There was no comprehensive and strategic plan for containment, because they lacked a full understanding of the risks and interconnections in the financial markets. ... While there was some awareness of, or at least a debate about, the housing bubble, the record reflects that senior public officials did not recognize that a bursting of the bubble could threaten the entire financial system. ... In addition, the government's inconsistent handling of major financial institutions during the crisis—the decision to rescue Bear Stearns and then to place Fannie Mae and Freddie Mac into conservatorship, followed by its decision not to save Lehman Brothers and then to save AIG—increased uncertainty and panic in the market."

- We conclude there was a systemic breakdown in accountability and ethics.

"In our economy, we expect businesses and individuals to pursue profits, at the same time that they produce products and services of quality and conduct themselves well. Unfortunately ... [l]enders made loans that they knew borrowers could not afford and that could cause massive losses to investors in mortgage securities. ... And the report documents that major financial institutions ineffectively sampled loans they were purchasing to package and sell to investors. They knew a significant percentage of the sampled loans did not meet their own underwriting standards or those of the originators. Nonetheless, they sold those securities to investors. The commission's review of many prospectuses provided to investors found that this critical information was not disclosed.

- We conclude collapsing mortgage-lending standards and the mortgage securitization pipeline lit and spread the flame of contagion and crisis.

"Many mortgage lenders set the bar so low that lenders simply took eager borrowers' qualifications on faith, often with a willful disregard for a borrower's ability to pay. ... While many of these mortgages were kept on banks' books, the bigger money came from global investors who clamored to put their cash into newly created mortgage-related securities. It appeared to financial institutions, investors, and regulators alike that risk had been conquered. ... But each step in the mortgage securitization pipeline depended on the next step to keep demand going. From the speculators who flipped houses to the mortgage brokers who scouted the loans, to the lenders who issued the mortgages, to the financial firms that created the mortgage-backed securities, collateralized debt obligations (CDOs), CDOs squared, and synthetic CDOs: no one in this pipeline of toxic mortgages had enough skin in the game. When borrowers stopped making mortgage payments, the losses—amplified by derivatives—rushed through the pipeline. As it turned out, these losses were concentrated in a set of systemically important financial institutions."

- We conclude over-the-counter derivatives contributed significantly to this crisis.

"The enactment of legislation in 2000 to ban the regulation by both the federal and state governments of over-the-counter (OTC) derivatives was a key turning point in the march toward the financial crisis. ... OTC derivatives contributed to the crisis in three significant ways. First, one type of derivative—credit default swaps (CDS) fueled the mortgage securitization pipeline. CDS were sold to investors to protect against the default or decline in value of mortgage-related securities backed by risky loans. ... Second, CDS were essential to the creation of synthetic CDOs. These synthetic CDOs were merely bets on the performance of real mortgage-related securities. They amplified the losses from the collapse of the housing bubble by allowing multiple bets on the same securities and helped spread them throughout the financial system. ... Finally, when the housing bubble popped and crisis followed, derivatives were in the center of the storm. AIG, which had not been required to put aside capital reserves as a cushion for the protection it was selling, was bailed out when it could not meet its obligations. The government ultimately committed more than $180 billion because of concerns that AIG's collapse would trigger cascading losses throughout the global financial system. In addition, the existence of millions of derivatives contracts of all types between systemically important financial institutions—unseen and unknown in this unregulated market—added to uncertainty and escalated panic, helping to precipitate government assistance to those institutions."

- We conclude the failures of credit rating agencies were essential cogs in the wheel of financial destruction.

"The three credit rating agencies were key enablers of the financial meltdown. The mortgage-related securities at the heart of the crisis could not have been marketed and sold without their seal of approval. Investors relied on them, often blindly. In some cases, they were obligated to use them, or regulatory capital standards were hinged on them. ... [T]he forces at work behind the breakdowns at Moody's ... includ[ed] the flawed computer models, the pressure from financial firms that paid for the ratings, the relentless drive for market share, the lack of resources to do the job despite record profits, and the absence of meaningful public oversight."

=== Dissenting Statements ===
==== Hennessey, Holtz-Eakin, and Thomas ====
In a 27-page dissenting statement, Vice Chairman Bill Thomas and Commissioners Keith Hennessey and Douglas Holtz-Eakin criticized the majority report for being an "account of bad events" rather than a "focused explanation of what happened and why." According to the three Republicans, the majority report ignored the global nature of the financial crisis and, consequently, focused too narrowly on US regulatory policy and supervision. For those reasons, the dissent argues that the majority's conclusion that the crisis could have been avoided with more restrictive regulations, in conjunction with more aggressive regulators and supervisors, is false. The dissent lists ten essential causes of the financial and economic crisis: Credit bubble, Housing bubble, Nontraditional mortgages, Credit ratings and securitization, Financial institutions concentrated correlated risk, Leverage and liquidity risk, Risk of contagion, Common shock, Financial shock and panic, Financial crisis causes economic crisis.

==== Wallison ====
American Enterprise Institute senior fellow Peter Wallison authored a 93-page dissent in which he disagreed with both the majority report and the three other Republican appointees. Wallison argued that the US government's housing policies—implemented primarily through the government-sponsored enterprises (GSEs) Fannie Mae and Freddie Mac—caused the financial crisis. In specific, Wallison named the GSEs' Affordable Housing goals, heightened enforcement of the Community Reinvestment Act, and the Department of Housing and Urban Development's Best Practices Initiative as the primary culprits. According to Wallison, these programs, which were intended to give low- and moderate-income borrowers better access to mortgage credit, ultimately required Fannie Mae and Freddie Mac to reduce the mortgage underwriting standards they used when acquiring loans from originators. Because the GSEs dominated the mortgage market, they set the underwriting standards for the entire industry and pushed private institutions into riskier loans. Wallison concludes that these policies fueled a massive housing bubble full of non-traditional, risky loans that ultimately led to a financial crisis. Regarding the AEI paper, Phil Angelides, chairman of the FCIC, has stated: "The source for this newfound wisdom [is] shopworn data, produced by a consultant to the corporate-funded American Enterprise Institute, which was analyzed and debunked by the FCIC Report."

=== Reception ===
The FCIC constructed the report to be broadly appealing, at least in part due to the commercial and critical success of past appealing reports. To that end, the Commission hired a communications firm, employed "cinematic language" within the report, and delayed the publishing of the report to continue working on its "unveiling."

The commissions efforts to make the report appealing were successful. It made The New York Times and The Washington Post best sellers lists and The New York Review of Books hailed it as "the most comprehensive indictment of the American financial failure that has yet been made" and "the definitive history of this period." The report was released on a Thursday and, by Sunday, Amazon had already run out of copies.

However, the report was not just commercially and critically successful. It was also favored by legal scholars for its exhaustive detail. From 2010 to 2013, it was cited by at least seventy-six law review articles, a number on par with that of the most cited law review article in 2009.

The vote of the four Republicans on the commission to ban the words "Wall Street," "shadow banking," "interconnection," and "deregulation" from the main report—which was rejected by the six Democratic commissioners but carried out in the dissenting Republican report—was criticized by some such as Bethany McLean, Paul Krugman, and Shahien Nasiripour. Business columnist Joe Nocera also criticized the partisanship of the Republican members of the commission who issued a nine-page, three-footnote minority report before the report had been written. According to Nocera the contents of the report "simply reiterates longstanding Republican dogma."

In April 2011, the United States Senate Homeland Security Permanent Subcommittee on Investigations released the Wall Street and the Financial Crisis: Anatomy of a Financial Collapse report, sometimes known as the "Levin-Coburn" report.

== Commission Reports ==
- FCIC Conclusions Excerpt
- "The Financial Crisis Inquiry Report (full text)" (PDF). gpo.gov.
- Financial Crisis Inquiry Report public domain audiobook at LibriVox
