= Judge Kaplan =

Judge Kaplan may refer to:

- Elaine D. Kaplan (born 1955), chief judge of the United States Court of Federal Claims
- Lewis A. Kaplan (born 1944), judge serving on the United States District Court for the Southern District of New York
