= Judge Schwartz =

Judge Schwartz may refer to:

- Allen G. Schwartz (1934–2003), judge of the United States District Court for the Southern District of New York
- Charles Schwartz Jr. (1922–2012), judge of the United States District Court for the Eastern District of Louisiana
- David Schwartz (judge) (1916–1989), judge of the United States Court of Claims
- Edward Joseph Schwartz (1912–2000), judge of the United States District Court for the Southern District of California
- Milton Lewis Schwartz (1920–2005), judge of the United States District Court for the Eastern District of California
- Murray Merle Schwartz (1931–2013), judge of the United States District Court for the District of Delaware
- Stephen S. Schwartz (born 1983), judge of the United States Court of Federal Claims
