= John Berry (ambassador) =

American government official & diplomat (born 1959)

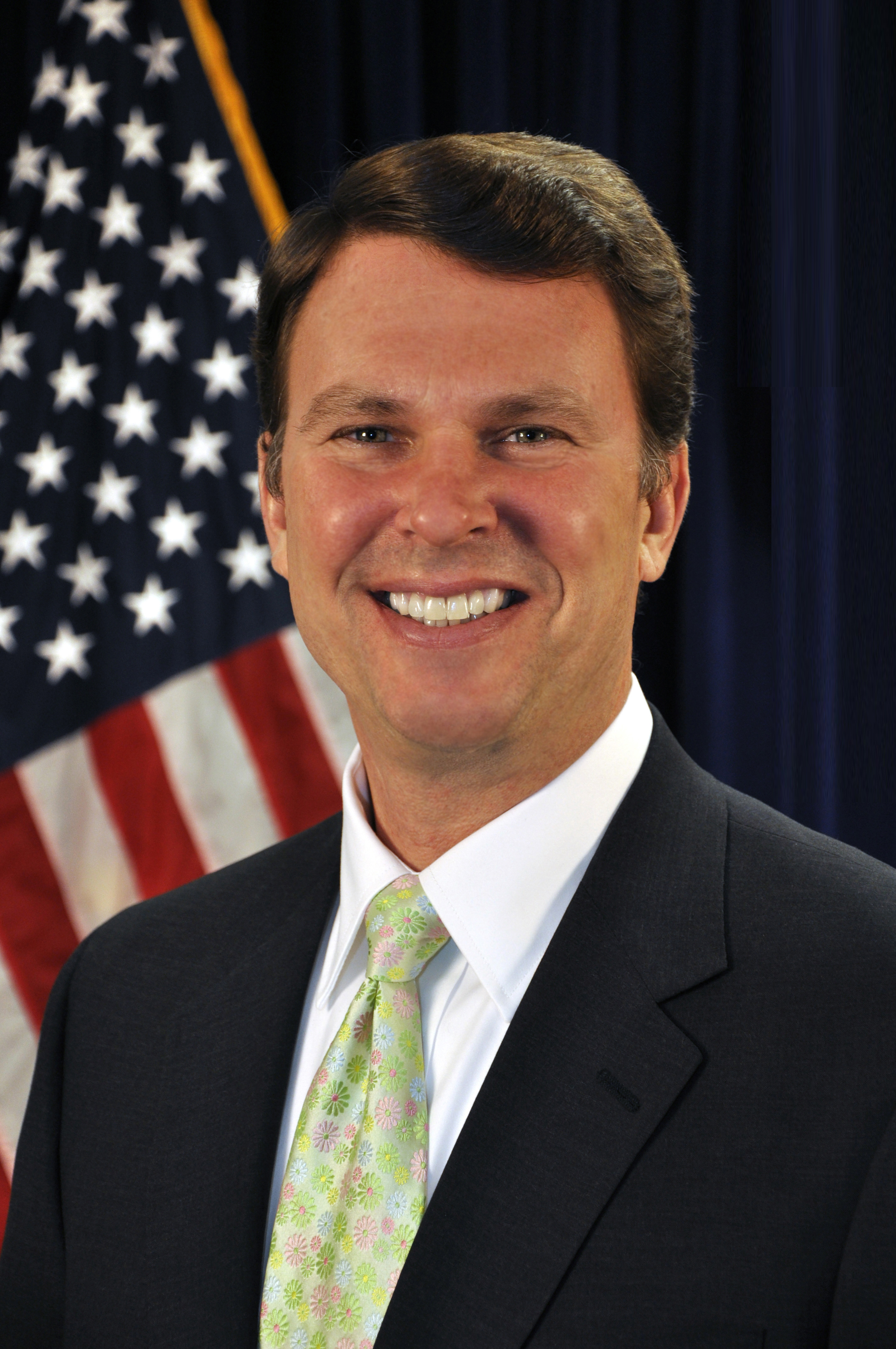

25th United States Ambassador to Australia
- In office September 25, 2013 – September 20, 2016
- President: Barack Obama
- Preceded by: Jeff Bleich
- Succeeded by: Arthur B. Culvahouse Jr.

Director of the Office of Personnel Management
- In office April 13, 2009 – April 13, 2013
- President: Barack Obama
- Preceded by: Kathie Whipple (Acting)
- Succeeded by: Elaine Kaplan (Acting)

Director of the National Zoological Park
- In office October 1, 2005 – April 13, 2009
- President: George W. Bush; Barack Obama
- Preceded by: Lucy Spelman
- Succeeded by: Steven Monfort (Acting)

Director of the National Fish and Wildlife Foundation
- In office 2000–2005
- President: Bill Clinton; George W. Bush
- Preceded by: Amos Eno
- Succeeded by: Jeff Trandahl

Personal details
- Born: Morrell John Berry; February 10, 1959 (age 67) Rockville, Maryland, U.S.
- Party: Democratic
- Spouse: Curtis Yee
- Education: University of Maryland, College Park (BA); Syracuse University (MPA)

Morrell John Berry (born February 10, 1959) is an American former government official. Berry was director of the United States Office of Personnel Management from 2009 to 2013 and United States Ambassador to Australia from 2013 to 2016.

Berry was born in Maryland, to parents who worked for the federal government. He completed degrees at the University of Maryland, and Syracuse University and worked in local government and as a legislative aide in state government from 1982 to 1985. From 1985 to 1994, he worked as legislative director for U.S. Representative Steny Hoyer. He held posts in the U.S. Treasury Department, the Smithsonian Institution, and the U.S. Department of the Interior until 2000, and worked as director of the National Fish and Wildlife Foundation and the National Zoological Park until 2009, when he was nominated by President Barack Obama as director of the United States Office of Personnel Management. Berry took office after being confirmed by the United States Senate in April 2009. In June 2013, President Obama nominated Berry to replace Jeff Bleich as U.S. Ambassador to Australia. He was confirmed by unanimous consent of the U.S. Senate in August 2013.

== Early life and education ==
Morrell John Berry was born in 1959 in Maryland, United States. His father served in the U.S. Marine Corps, his mother worked for the U.S. Census Bureau, and he has a brother and a sister. Berry graduated from high school in 1977 and finished a Bachelor of Arts in government and politics from the University of Maryland in 1980. In 1981, Berry graduated from the Maxwell School of Citizenship and Public Affairs at Syracuse University with a Master of Public Administration.

== Career ==
Berry served in management for the Montgomery County government from 1982 to 1984 and as staff director of the Maryland Senate Finance Committee from 1984 to 1985. From 1985 to 1994, he was legislative director for U.S. Representative Steny Hoyer, and associate staffer on the House Appropriations Committee. Berry assisted Hoyer on employment issues of the federal government, and played a leading role in negotiations that led to the Federal Employees Pay Comparability Act of 1990, which established the locality pay system. From 1994 to 1995, Berry served as Deputy Assistant Secretary and acting Assistant Secretary for Law Enforcement in the U.S. Treasury Department. From 1995 to 1997, Berry worked as director of government relations and as senior policy advisor at the Smithsonian Institution.

=== Department of the Interior ===
Berry was appointed Assistant Secretary for Policy, Management and Budget at the U.S. Department of the Interior during the Clinton administration, serving from 1997 to 2001. At the Interior Department, Berry improved credit union and continuing education options, oversaw the expansion of department programs to improve employees' work-life balance, and held town hall meetings with Interior employees and used their suggestions to upgrade a cafeteria and health center. These changes were partly funded through partnerships with federal employees, unions and other agencies to reduce costs for the department. Berry worked to create a complaint procedure for employees who experience discrimination because of their sexual orientation, to expand relocation benefits and counseling services to domestic partners of employees, to establish a liaison to gay and lesbian workers, and to eliminate discriminatory provisions of the National Park Service's law enforcement standards. He helped establish an office supply store for Interior employees, which he staffed with disabled workers. Berry oversaw one of the largest budgetary increases in the department's history.

In 2000, Berry became director of the National Fish and Wildlife Foundation, where he worked with Interior Inspector General Earl Devaney to reconcile twenty years of financial records, improve management, and conserve wildlife habitat through public-private partnerships. Berry was appointed from October 1, 2005, to serve as director of the National Zoo, which had been found to have shortcomings in record keeping and maintenance. Berry created a strategic planning and modernization process for the zoo. This included a twenty-year capital plan, securing $35 million in funding to provide for fire protection, and beginning renovations to animal houses.

The Berry Bastion, an Antarctic mountain, was named in his honor.

=== Office of Personnel Management ===
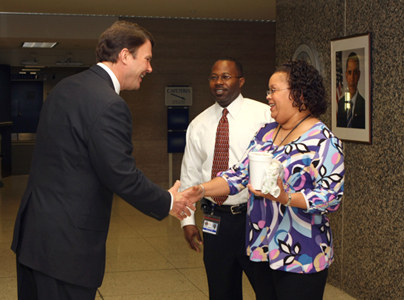
Berry greeting employees at OPM headquarters on his first day as agency director

In 2008, Berry was mentioned as a possible nominee for U.S. Secretary of the Interior, a position obtained by Ken Salazar. President Barack Obama announced his intention to nominate Berry as director of the Office of Personnel Management on March 3, 2009, and did so on March 4. The nomination hearing before the Senate Homeland Security Committee on March 26, 2009, led to expectation of easy confirmation for Berry, despite opposition from conservative activists based on Berry's homosexuality. In the hearing Berry stated he supported any effective employee compensation system, but that the federal government had the obligation to give employees with comparable job performances similar pay and treatment. He pledged to preserve veterans preference and supplement it with training programs to prepare veterans for federal jobs, and promised reviews of proposals to improve the security clearance and hiring processes. Berry emphasized the importance for agencies to use all recruitment tools, citing relocation benefits that could keep agencies competitive with the private sector, and stated he would create a strategic plan and set performance goals for the Office of Personnel Management. Berry had stated support for benefits for same-sex partners of federal employees and a repeal of the Defense of Marriage Act.

The Senate confirmed Berry on April 3, 2009, and he was sworn in April 13 as the first agency director in the Obama administration with all senior staff in place. The ceremonial swearing in on April 23 was attended by First Lady Michelle Obama. At the time, Berry was, according to the Human Rights Campaign, the highest-ranking openly gay official to serve in the executive branch in any U.S. administration.

=== U.S. Ambassador to Australia ===
In June 2013, President Obama nominated Berry to be the US ambassador to Australia, the first openly gay U.S. ambassador to a G-20 nation. On August 1, 2013, the United States Senate confirmed Berry by unanimous consent. Australian media coverage of Berry's appointment was overwhelmingly positive with a video he posted to the US Embassy website being described as the "friendliest introduction video in diplomatic history" while Berry himself was described as "modest", with an "impressive record". Federal News Radio in the US reported that, "more than 200 people had posted responses" to the video, "most of which were warm and cordial".

=== AAA ===
In 2016 he was appointed president of the American Australian Association.

== Personal life ==
Before being appointed as ambassador to Australia, Berry lived in Washington, D.C.

Berry is openly gay. On August 10, 2013, he married Curtis Yee, his partner for 17 years, at St Margaret's Episcopal Church in Washington.

== See also ==
- List of LGBT ambassadors of the United States

Political offices
| Preceded by Kathie Whipple; Acting | Director of the Office of Personnel Management; 2009–2013 | Succeeded by Elaine Kaplan; Acting |
Diplomatic posts
| Preceded by Jeff Bleich | United States Ambassador to Australia; 2013–2016 | Succeeded by Arthur B. Culvahouse Jr. |
