= Jeff Bleich =

American lawyer and diplomat

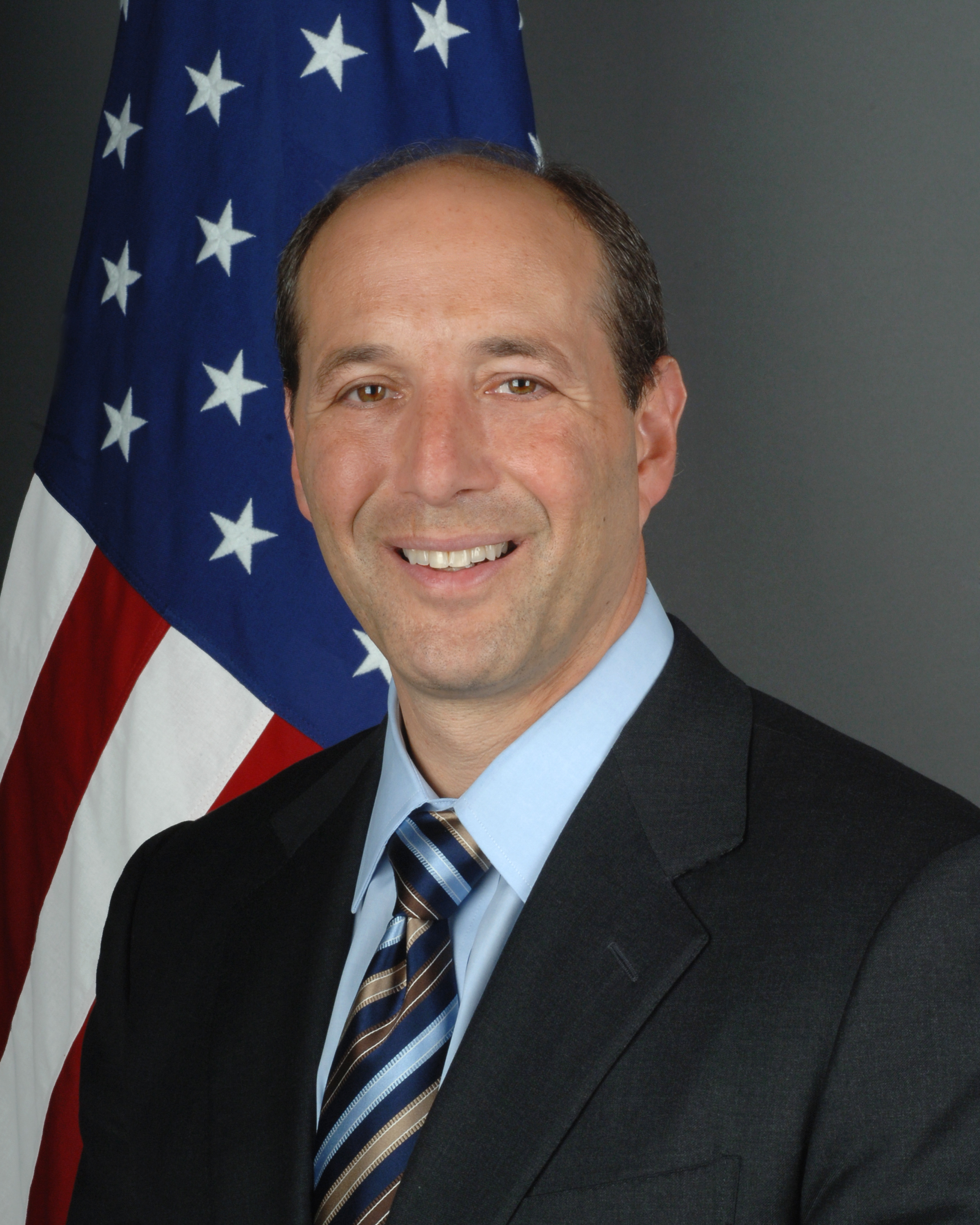

24th United States Ambassador to Australia
- In office November 26, 2009 – September 12, 2013
- President: Barack Obama
- Preceded by: Robert McCallum Jr.
- Succeeded by: John Berry

Personal details
- Born: Jeffrey Laurence Bleich; 1961 (age 64–65) Birkenfeld, West Germany (now Germany)
- Party: Democratic
- Spouse: Becky Pratt
- Children: 3
- Education: Amherst College (BA); Harvard University (MPP); University of California, Berkeley (JD)

Jeffrey Laurence Bleich (/blaɪʃ/; born 1961) is an American lawyer, diplomat, tech executive, and academic from California.

Bleich is the former United States Ambassador to Australia, and currently the General Counsel, of Anthropic. A longtime friend of President Barack Obama, Bleich joined the White House staff in March 2009 as special counsel to the president and was nominated later that year to become the U.S. Ambassador to Australia. Bleich served as ambassador from 2009 to 2013. After stepping down from his post, he returned to the United States and became a partner at Munger, Tolles & Olson and later group CEO at the Dentons law firm in San Francisco. He ran in the primary for Lieutenant Governor of California in the 2018 election, before being appointed as a special master for multi-district litigation for the U.S. District Court, and later serving as CLO and General Counsel at Cruise and Anthropic, respectively.

== Early life and education ==
Jeffrey Laurence Bleich was born in 1961 at the U.S. 98th Army Hospital in Germany and grew up in the U.S. state of Connecticut. He graduated from Hall High School in West Hartford, Connecticut. Bleich graduated from Amherst College magna cum laude with a Bachelor of Arts degree in political science in 1983. Bleich was admitted to study at Harvard University but deferred for a year to take a public policy fellowship at Coro in St. Louis, where he became involved in juvenile justice issues. At Harvard, Bleich went to the John F. Kennedy School of Government as a 1986 John F. Kennedy Fellow, graduating with a Master of Public Policy. Bleich attended the University of California, Berkeley School of Law and received his J.D. in 1989. He was editor-in-chief of the California Law Review and Order of the Coif. He received a Certificate of Study in Public and Private International Law from the Hague Academy of International Law, Netherlands in 1993.

== Legal career ==
Bleich served as a law clerk to Judge Abner Mikva of the United States Court of Appeals for the District of Columbia Circuit from 1989 to 1990 and to Chief Justice William H. Rehnquist of the Supreme Court of the United States from 1990 to 1991. He was legal assistant to Judge Howard M. Holtzmann of the Iran-United States Claims Tribunal at The Hague from 1991 to 1992, and Special Rapporteur to the Permanent Court of Arbitration.

Bleich joined the Los Angeles-headquartered firm Munger, Tolles & Olson LLP in 1992, and was made partner three years later, in December 1995. His practice there was focused primarily on general civil litigation, with emphasis on complex litigation, appellate practice, media law, communications law, and intellectual property.

From 1993 to 2006 Bleich served as an adjunct lecturer in law at Berkeley Law, teaching constitutional law and upper-level seminar courses in international human rights, habeas corpus, and appellate advocacy.

Bleich served as president of the State Bar of California from 2007 to 2008 and held leadership positions in several other legal services organizations, including president of the San Francisco Bar Association in 2003, president of the Barristers Club of San Francisco, Chair of Legal Services for Children, Co-chair of the Lawyers Committee for Civil Rights for the SF Bay Area, and the Edward J. McFetridge American Inn of Court. Bleich served as chair of the American Bar Association Amicus Curiae Committee from 2006 to 2009. He also served on an ABA subcommittee on corporate social responsibility and on the ABA Section on International Law. He was elected to the American Law Institute in 2003. He has published over 100 law and policy articles and served on some 20 different boards, including the boards of Human Rights Watch and Legal Community Against Violence as well as the Boalt Hall Alumni Association and the Legal Aid Society of San Francisco.

In 2009, President Barack Obama appointed Bleich as special counsel to the president in the White House. Among his tasks was to address confirmation and personnel issues and to advise on other sensitive matters. He moderated a discussion on human rights in the new administration at the 2009 American Bar Association's Section of International Law Spring Meeting in April 2009.

Bleich returned to private practice in 2014. Following the end of his diplomatic service, Bleich rejoined the partnership at the San Francisco office of Munger, Tolles & Olson. In 2016, Bleich joined Dentons LLP. Bleich's practice focused on cybersecurity, trade, and international disputes, as well as on-pro bono work., He was selected in 2014, 2015, and 2016 as one of the leading 500 Lawyers in the U.S. Serving pro bono, he obtained posthumous admission to the California Bar for a Chinese national, Hong Yen Chang, in a petition addressing the unlawful exclusion of Chinese in the 1890s, leading the Court to "right this historic wrong." Bleich also successfully represented a victim of domestic violence in an action against her abuser in a second unanimous decision by the California Supreme Court. In 2016, he was profiled by LawDragon as one of the "rock stars" of law.

Bleich was appointed Special Master for the United States District Court in a multi-district litigation dispute involving international price fixing, and also has served as a neutral in high-stakes technology disputes, including mediating a $650 million settlement the In re Facebooks Biometrics case.

Bleich joined Cruise LLC, the autonomous vehicle company backed by GM, Honda, Softbank, Microsoft, Walmart, and T. Rowe Price as Chief Legal Officer in 2020. in 2025, Bleich joined AI Frontier Lab, Anthropic, as General Counsel.

== Higher education and academic positions ==
Bleich served on the board of trustees of California State University, from 2004 to 2009. He served as vice chair from 2006 to 2008 and as chair from 2008 to 2009.

From 2014 to 2020, Bleich served as a member of the Fulbright Foreign Scholarship Board and as the board chair from 2016 to 2019.

Bleich served on the Board of Stanford's Center for the Advanced Study of Behavioral Sciences. He also joined CASBS as a Visiting Scholar from 2024 to 2025, where he published Substack writings on Yascha Mounk and Frances Fukuyama's "Persuasion" Stack.

He was elected to the board of his alma mater Amherst College in 2017.

Bleich served as an adjunct professor at the University of Sydney's United States Studies Centre.

In 2018, Flinders University in Adelaide, South Australia, named Bleich a professorial fellow to its College of Business, Government and Law.

== U.S. Ambassador to Australia ==
Prior to being selected by President Obama to serve as U.S. Ambassador, Bleich had been a life member of the Council on Foreign Relations the Pacific Council on International Policy, the International Law Association, and a member of the advisory board of the American Society of International Law.

The Senate confirmed Bleich to be United States Ambassador to Australia in a voice vote on November 10, 2009. His diplomatic credentials were accepted by the Governor-General of Australia, Quentin Bryce, on November 24, 2009. Bleich's term in Australia was marked by the U.S. "rebalance" to the Asia-Pacific, with Australia being the focal point for that shift.

Bleich joined President Obama at the announcement of the rebalance at a special sitting of Parliament in Canberra before traveling with Obama to Darwin, Northern Territory. Other key achievements included overseeing record growth in trade between the U.S. and Australia, bringing the Defense Trade Cooperation Treaty into force, establishing new alliance agreements for satellites and cyber, executing a new space cooperation agreement that supported the Mars Curiosity rover landing, leading joint U.S.-Australia efforts in Afghanistan's Oruzgan province, and promoting regional efforts to reduce domestic violence.

For his service, Bleich received numerous awards, including the highest civilian honors awarded by the U.S. Secretary of the Navy and Director of National Intelligence. In 2013, he received the State Department's highest award for a non-career ambassador, the Sue M. Cobb Prize for Exemplary Diplomatic Service. Former prime minister Paul Keating called Bleich "the best U.S. Ambassador ever sent to Australia" at the John Curtin Lecture in Perth. The Australian newspaper called Bleich "Obama's Superman."

== Other involvement in politics ==
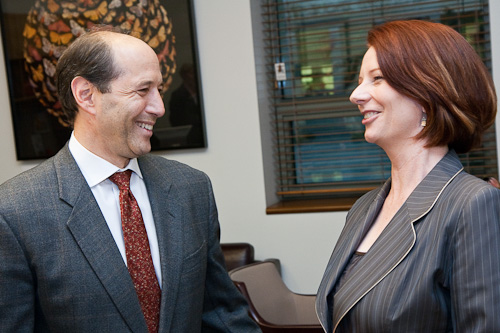
Bleich with Australian Prime Minister Julia Gillard

During the Clinton administration, Bleich served as director of the White House Council on Youth Violence, formed during the aftermath of the Columbine High School massacre.

Bleich met Barack Obama almost 20 years before Bleich was nominated to become U.S. Ambassador to Australia, when Bleich tried to recruit Obama to become a law clerk to Abner Mikva. The two later became friends. Bleich was in attendance during Obama's keynote address at the 2004 Democratic National Convention and shared breakfast with him two days later.

During Obama's 2008 presidential campaign, Bleich was a founding member and co-chair of Obama's national finance committee, co-chair of Obama's higher education advisory board, and California co-chair. He donated to Hillary Clinton and raised funds for her to retire her campaign's debt after the Democratic primary.

Bleich joined the White House team in March 2009, serving as special counsel to the president until his nomination as Ambassador.

Bleich served on the Asia Policy and Cybersecurity Policy teams for Secretary Hillary Clinton, and was a member of National Security Leaders for Biden in 2020 Presidential Campaign. and his National Finance Committee.

On May 30, 2017, Bleich formally launched his campaign to become the 50th lieutenant governor of the U.S. state of California. He lost in the Democratic primary to Eleni Kounalakis, who went on to be elected lieutenant governor on November 6, 2018.

== Post-diplomatic career ==
Bleich was the chair of the board of Nuix, a publicly traded company on the ASX. Nuix produces forensics and information integrity software that was used in the Panama Papers investigation. It was the largest tech IPO of any company on the ASX in 2020 and one of the largest tech IPOs ever on the ASX.

Bleich served as chair of the board of PG&E Company during its bankruptcy proceedings from April 2019 to May 2020. Bleich joined PG&E as part of an interim Board to restructure the company following its liability exposure for fires associated with PG&E equipment in 2017 and 2018. Bleich participated in PG&E's reparations to all wildfire victims, the company's acknowledgement of criminal wrong-doing, and its successful emergence from Bankruptcy.

Bleich served on the Fulbright Foreign Scholarship Board after being appointed by President Obama in November 2014, and was later elected vice-chair and then chair for three successive terms.

Bleich served by appointment of former secretary of state John Kerry on the board of the East West Center as a member of the executive committee from 2017 to 2021.

Bleich was appointed by President Biden to the National Security Education Board.

In California, Governor Jerry Brown appointed Bleich to the Governor's International Trade and Investment Advisory Council., and then-Attorney General Kamala Harris appointed Bleich to serve on her Blue Ribbon Cyber-Exploitation Panel. Bleich also chaired Governor Brown's judicial selection advisory committee for the selection of judges from 2014 to 2018. Bleich was appointed by Chief Justice Tani Cantil-Sakauye to serve as vice-chair of the Rules Revision Commission for the State Bar.

Bleich has served on a number of other private company and non-profit boards since 2014, including RAND Australia, the Pratt Family Advisory Board, Futures Without Violence, the World Affairs Council, the American Security Project, Verified Voting, the San Francisco Symphony, the Folger Shakespeare Library, and the Sorensen Center for International Peace and Justice.

== Recognition and honours ==
Bleich was recognized as one of the Top 100 Lawyers in California by the Daily Journal, as California Attorney of the Year by California Lawyer, and as one of America's leading "Bet the Company" lawyers by Best Lawyers. In 2024 he received the Burton "Legends in Law" at the Library of Congress.

Bleich has also been recognized for his pro bono service to immigrants, homeless and foster youth, veterans, victims of gun violence, survivors of domestic abuse, human rights organizations, religious and racial minorities, gay and lesbian service members, journalists, Native Americans, detainees, and others victims of discrimination. These include the Peter Haas Public Service Medal from University of California, Berkeley, the ABA Pro Bono Publico Award, the Lawyers Committee for Civil Rights Robert Sproul Award, the American Jewish Committee Learned Hand Award, and the One Justice Attorney of the Year Award. In November 2017 he received the Ruth Bader Ginsburg Award for Excellence in the Legal Profession from the Jewish Bar Association of San Francisco.

Bleich also holds at least three honorary degrees:

- In May 2011, Bleich was awarded an honorary doctor of laws degree from San Francisco State University.
- In 2014, Flinders University in Adelaide, South Australia, awarded him the honorary degree of doctor of the university.
- Griffith University in Queensland, Australia, awarded Bleich the honorary degree of doctor of the university in 2019.

=== Jeff Bleich Centre ===
In 2018, Flinders University in Adelaide established the Jeff Bleich Centre for the U.S. Alliance in Digital Technology, Security, and Governance, in recognition of Bleich's work in this field. Now called the Jeff Bleich Centre for Democracy and Disruptive Technologies (JBC), the centre is a research centre within the College of Business, Government and Law at Flinders.

== Family and personal life ==
Bleich's wife is Rebecca Pratt "Becky" Bleich, and they have three children. He collects Elvis Presley memorabilia.

Bleich was a longtime friend of Willie Mays, and serves as trustee of the Willie Mays and May Maes Trust and chair of the board of the Say Hey Foundation. In Australia, he regularly attended home games of the Canberra Cavalry Australian Baseball League team, normally in association with the American Australian Association.

== See also ==
- List of law clerks for the chief justice of the United States

Diplomatic posts
Preceded by Robert McCallum Jr.	United States Ambassador to Australia; 2009–2013	Succeeded by John Berry
