= Christine Odell Cook Miller =

American judge

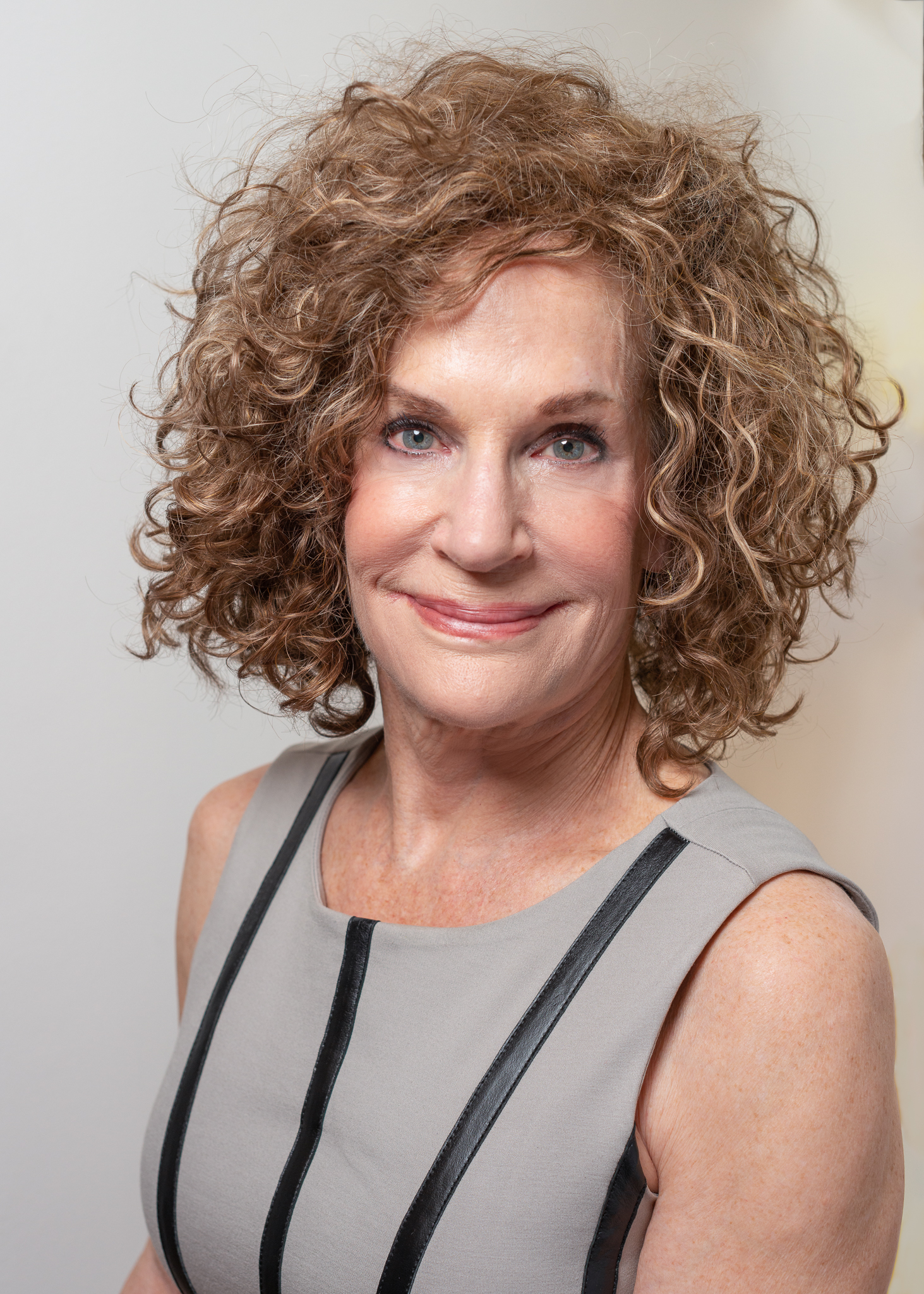

Senior Judge of the United States Court of Federal Claims
- In office February 4, 2013 – March 1, 2013

Judge of the United States Court of Federal Claims
- In office December 10, 1982 – February 4, 2013
- Appointed by: Ronald Reagan; Bill Clinton (reappointment)
- Preceded by: David Schwartz
- Succeeded by: Elaine D. Kaplan

Personal details
- Born: Christine Cook Nettesheim; August 26, 1944 (age 81) Oakland, California, U.S.
- Education: Stanford University (BS); University of Utah (JD)

Christine Odell Cook Miller (born August 26, 1944) is an American attorney who served as a judge of the United States Court of Federal Claims from 1982 to 2013.

== Early life ==
Miller was born in Oakland, California, on August 26, 1944. She received a Bachelor of Science from Stanford University in 1966 and a Juris Doctor from the University of Utah College of Law in 1969. While there, she was a comment editor for the Utah Law Review and a member of the Utah Chapter of the Order of the Coif. Miller was a law clerk for Judge David Thomas Lewis of the United States Court of Appeals for the Tenth Circuit from 1969 to 1970.

== Career ==
Miller a trial attorney in the Civil Division of the U.S. Department of Justice from 1970 to 1972 and in the Bureau of Consumer Protection of the Federal Trade Commission from 1972 to 1974. In 1976, Miller entered private practice with the litigation section of Hogan and Hartson, in Washington, D.C. She then served as special counsel to the Pension Benefit Guaranty Corporation from 1976 to 1978 and as assistant general counsel to the U.S. Railway Association from 1978 to 1980, returning to litigation practice from 1980 to 1982 with Shack and Kimball P.C.

On November 29, 1982, Miller was nominated by President Ronald Reagan to a fifteen-year term on the U.S. Claims Court in a seat vacated by David Schwartz. She was confirmed by the United States Senate on December 10, 1982, and received her commission on December 10, 1982. At the time of her confirmation, she was confirmed under the name, Christine Cook Nettesheim. She was thereafter nominated for reappointment to the same position by President Bill Clinton on November 6, 1997, and in the interim was reappointed by a recess appointment from Clinton on December 10, 1997. Her reappointment was formally confirmed by the Senate on February 3, 1998, and she received a commission on February 4, 1998. Miller assumed senior status on February 4, 2013, and then retired completely from the court on March 1, 2013.

== Personal life ==
Miller was married to Dennis F. Miller, but served from her appointment until September 10, 1994, under the name Christine Cook Nettesheim.

Legal offices
| Preceded by David Schwartz | Judge of the United States Court of Federal Claims; 1982–2013 | Succeeded by Elaine D. Kaplan |
