= Byron Georgiou =

American lawyer and activist

Byron Stephen Georgiou is an American financial lawyer, investor and political activist. In 2009 he was appointed to the US Financial Crisis Inquiry Commission (FCIC). He was a candidate for the US Senate from Nevada in 2011.

== Education ==
Georgiou received his undergraduate degree from Stanford University in 1970, attending on a full academic scholarship, and his JD in 1974 from Harvard Law School.

== Career ==
Georgiou worked on behalf of farmworkers via the California Agricultural Labor Relations Board in the late 1970s, and as a counselor to California Governor Jerry Brown in the early 1980s before going into private practice in San Diego (1983–94). In 2009 he was “of counsel” with the law firm Coughlin Stoia Geller Rudman and Robbins, LLP and related San Diego firm Robbins Geller Rudman & Dowd LLP.

Georgiou "helped lead a team of 30 lawyers to recover $7.5 billion for investors bilked in the Enron fiasco." With Coughlin Stoia and Robbins Geller since 2000, he has had a leadership role in the litigations prosecuting financial fraud on behalf of defrauded investors at Enron, WorldCom, Dynegy, AOL Time Warner, and UnitedHealth. He is currently president of Georgiou Enterprises, which has wide-ranging interests including partnerships in several private equity firms, a portfolio of carbon emission reduction projects in China that generate carbon credits under the Kyoto Protocol, environmental cleanup of deep coal mining sites, residential and commercial real estate and golf course management and development, and the provision of customer services at regional shopping centers throughout America. He is on the advisory board of Harvard Law School's corporate governance program and contributes to its blog.

=== Financial Crisis Inquiry Commission ===
Georgiou was one of three appointees by United States Senate Majority Leader Harry Reid to the FCIC, along with fellow Nevada resident Heather Murren and Sen. Bob Graham, (D-FL). At the time of Georgiou's appointment to the commission, concerns were raised about a conflict of interest, pointing to Coughlin Stoia lawsuits against big Wall Street firms. A report at the time said Georgiou had no equity in the firm and no financial stake in the lawsuits. Lucian Bebchuk, who runs the Harvard Law corporate governance program and consulted with Georgiou on the financial-fraud issues, said Georgiou brought "a rich experience and broad perspective" to the commission assignment, at the same time. In the opening FCIC session in September, 2009, "Commissioner Georgiou highlighted the importance of untangling the 'too big to fail' phenomenon. He emphasized that the Commission should probe the role played by financial instruments and policies which allowed the creators of securities to abandon responsibility for the ultimate performance or failure of assets."

=== House campaign California ===
In 1990 he ran for a seat in the U.S. House of Representatives. In the Democratic primary he was defeated by incumbent Jim Bates 63% to 37%.

=== Senate campaign Nevada ===
In March 2011, Georgiou officially entered the race for the U.S. Senate in Nevada, claiming he had received "significant encouragement to run both at a local and national level." He was the first Democrat to file his candidacy for the seat, which opened upon the announced retirement of Republican incumbent John Ensign. On August 8, 2011, Georgiou ended his campaign, saying that he could "more effectively contribute to resolution of the serious economic issues facing our state and nation" through his work in the private sector than in the Senate.

=== Xtreme Green Electric Vehicles, Inc. ===
In 2015, Georgiou was CEO and chairperson of the Board of Xtreme Green Electric Vehicles, Inc. in Las Vegas.

== Personal life ==
Georgiou has lived in the Las Vegas Valley since 2005 with his wife, Dr. Thérèse Collins. The couple has three daughters.
