= Wall Street and the Financial Crisis: Anatomy of a Financial Collapse =

Wall Street and the Financial Crisis: Anatomy of a Financial Collapse is a report on the 2008 financial crisis issued on April 13, 2011 by the United States Senate Permanent Subcommittee on Investigations. The 639-page report was issued under the chairmanship of Senators Carl Levin and Tom Coburn, and is colloquially known as the Levin-Coburn Report. After conducting "over 150 interviews and depositions, consulting with dozens of government, academic, and private sector experts" found that "the crisis was not a natural disaster, but the result of high risk, complex financial products, undisclosed conflicts of interest; and the failure of regulators, the credit rating agencies, and the market itself to rein in the excesses of Wall Street." In an interview, Senator Levin noted that "The overwhelming evidence is that those institutions deceived their clients and deceived the public, and they were aided and abetted by deferential regulators and credit ratings agencies who had conflicts of interest." By the end of their two-year investigation, the staff amassed 56 million pages of memos, documents, prospectuses and e-mails. The report, which contains 2,800 footnotes and references thousands of internal documents focused on four major areas of concern regarding the failure of the financial system: high risk mortgage lending, failure of regulators to stop such practices, inflated credit ratings, and abuses of the system by investment banks. The Report also issued several recommendations for future action regarding each of these categories.

The Financial Crisis Inquiry Commission released its report on the 2008 financial crisis in January 2011.

== Report findings ==
The Report found that the four causative aspects of the crisis were all interconnected in facilitating the risky practices that ultimately led to the collapse of the global financial system. Lenders sold and securitized high risk and complex home loans while practicing subpar underwriting, preying on unqualified buyers to maximize profits. The credit rating agencies granted these securities safe investment ratings, which facilitated their sale to investors around the globe. Federal securities regulators failed to execute their duty to ensure safe and sound lending and risk management by lenders and investment banks. Investment banks engineered and promoted complex and poor quality financial products composed of these high risk home loans. They allowed investors to use credit default swaps to bet on the failure of these financial products, and in cases disregarded conflicts of interest by themselves betting against products they marketed and sold to their own clients. The collusion of these four institutions led to the rise of a massive bubble of securities based on high risk home loans. When the unqualified buyers finally defaulted on their mortgages, the entire global financial system incurred massive losses.

=== High Risk Lending: Case Study of Washington Mutual Bank ===
Through a case study of Washington Mutual Bank (WaMu), the Report found that in 2006, WaMu began pursuing high risk loans to pursue higher profits. A year later, these mortgages began to fail, along with the mortgage-backed securities the bank offered. As shareholders lost confidence, stock prices fell and the bank suffered a liquidity crisis. The Office of Thrift Supervision, the chief regulator of WaMu, placed the bank under receivership of the Federal Deposit Insurance Corporation (FDIC), who then sold the bank to JPMorgan. If the sale had not gone through, the toxic assets held by WaMu would have exhausted the FDIC's insurance fund completely.

The report found that WaMu sold high risk Option Adjustable-rate mortgages (Option ARMs) in bulk, specifically to the Federal National Mortgage Association (Fannie Mae) and Federal Home Loan Mortgage Corporation (Freddie Mac). WaMu often sold these loans to unqualified buyers and would attract buyers with short term "teaser" rates that would skyrocket later on in the term. The Report found that WaMu and other big banks were inclined to make these risky sales because the higher risk loans and mortgage backed securities sold for higher prices on Wall Street. These lenders, however, simply passed the risk on to investors rather than absorbing them themselves.

=== Regulatory Failures: Case Study of the Office of Thrift Supervision ===
The Office of Thrift Supervision (OTS) was cited in the Report as a major culprit in financial collapse, for their "failure to stop the unsafe and unsound practices that led to the demise of Washington Mutual" While OTS identified over 500 deficiencies at WaMu, they did not take any regulatory action against the bank. OTS repeatedly requested corrective action, but the bank never followed through on their promises. The Report also cites the regulatory culture within OTS as an issue that exacerbated the lack of oversight. OTS consistently referred to the banks it oversaw as its "constituents." They favored asking banks to correct problems rather than enforcing regulation, even though the banks rarely followed through on the agreements.

=== Inflated Credit Ratings: Case Study of Moody's and Standard & Poor's ===
The case study of Moody's Investors Service, Inc. (Moody's) and Standard & Poor's Financial Services LLC (S&P) exposed a combination of inaccurate readings and conflicts of interest within the credit rating agency community. Due to a lack of regulation, agencies were able to place quantity over quality in rating of securities. Credit rating agencies were paid by Wall Street firms for their rating service. If credit rating agencies were to issue anything less than a AAA rating, they could be run out of business by the Wall Street firms they depended on. In the years leading up to the 2008 crisis, Moody's and S&P rated tens of thousands of U.S. residential mortgage-backed securities (RMBS) and collateralized debt obligations (CDOs). They regularly inflated the ratings, giving AAA grade ratings to the majority of RMBS and CDO securities, even though many were based on high risk home loans. In 2006, the high risk home loans began to fail, yet Moody's and S&P continued, for 6 months, to issue AAA ratings to the same quality securities. After the CDOs and RMBS securities that consisted of these home loans began to incur losses, the rating agencies turned around and quickly began to downgrade the high risk securities. Now saturated with toxic and unmarketable assets, the RMBS and CDO securities market collapsed. Traditionally, AAA rated securities had less than a 1% probability of default. In 2007, the majority of RMBS and CDO securities with AAA ratings suffered losses. 90% of AAA ratings given to subprime RMBS securities originated in 2006 and 2007 were later downgraded to junk status by credit rating agencies.

=== Investment Bank Abuses: Case Study of Goldman Sachs and Deutsche Bank ===
The Report cites investment banks as a major player in the lead up to the crisis, and uses a case study of two leading participants in the U.S. mortgage market, Goldman Sachs and Deutsche Bank. The case study found that from 2004 to 2008, banks focused their efforts heavily on RMBS and CDO securities, complex and high risk financial products that they could bundle and sell to investors who did not necessarily know the composition of the product. Financial institutions issued $2.5 trillion in RMBS and $1.4 trillion in CDO securities. They created large trading desks that dealt strictly in RMBS and CDO securities. More alarmingly, their trading desks began to take out insurance policies against the RMBS and CDO securities, allowing them to wager on the fall in value of their own asset. They acted in many instances as an intermediary between two opposing parties who wished to bet on either side of the future value of a security. This practice led to a blatant conflict of interest in the securities market, as the banks used "net short" positions, in which they wagered on the fall of a security, to profit off the failure of a security they had sold to their own client.

The case study of Goldman Sachs exemplifies this conflict of interest. They underwrote about $100 billion in RMBS and CDO securities in 2006 and 2007. They saw their securities were defaulting, and instead of warning investors to stay away from those products, they began developing a short position that would allow them to profit off of the inevitable collapse of the mortgage market. They amassed a $13.9 billion net short, and made $3.7 billion in profit in 2007 from the decline of the mortgage market. They sold RMBS and CDO securities to their own clients without notifying them of their conflict, that they had a multibillion-dollar short against that same product. The case study further examines four CDOs sold by Goldman known as Hudson 1, Anderson, Timberwolf, and Abacus 2007-AC1. The study found that Goldman would sometimes take risky assets they held in their inventory and dump them into these CDOs. They knowingly included low-value and poor quality assets in them, and in three of the CDOs, they had taken a short position against the CDO. Goldman sold their own toxic assets to their clients, then proceeded to bet against them, without ever notifying anyone about their conflict of interest. In the case of Hudson 1, Goldman took a 100% short against the $2 billion CDO, and then sold the CDO to their clients. The security soon lost value, and while their clients lost their investments, Goldman made $1.7 billion. In the Timberwolf CDO, Goldman sold the securities above book value to their clients, then soon dropped the price after the sale, causing their clients to incur quick losses. The Timberwolf security lost 80% of its value within 5 months and is worthless today. In the case of the Abacus CDO, Goldman did not take a short position, but allowed Paulson & Co. Inc., a hedge fund with relations to former Treasury Secretary and Goldman executive Henry Paulson, although the two are not related, to select the assets included in the CDO. Goldman marketed and sold the security to their clients, never disclosing the role of Paulson & Co. Inc. in the asset selection process or the fact that the CDO was designed to lose value in the first place. Today, the Abacus securities are worthless, while the Paulson hedge fund made about $3 billion.

In the Deutsche Bank case study, the Report focuses on the bank's top CDO trader, Greg Lippmann. He warned colleagues that the RMBS and CDO securities were "crap" and "pigs" and could make money taking shorts against them. He predicted the securities would lose value and called the financial industry's CDO operation as a "ponzi scheme." Deutsche Bank took out a $5 billion short position against the RMBS market from 2005 to 2007, earning a profit of $1.5 billion. The case studies of these two investment firms also show that even as mortgage delinquencies increased in 2008, the banks continued to heavily market CDOs and RMBS securities to their clients. The banks knew that if they were to stop their "CDO machine" that was churning out record profits and record executive bonuses, the firms would have to cut back on their excesses and close their CDO desks. The studies show how the credit default swaps that allowed investors and banks themselves to place bets on either side of the performance of a security further intensified market risk. Finally, they show that the unscrupulous trading techniques at the banks led to "dramatic losses in the case of Deutsche Bank and undisclosed conflicts of interest in the case of Goldman Sachs." The Report found that the investment banks were "the driving force" behind the risk-laden CDO and RMBS market's expansion in the U.S. financial system, and the banks were a major cause of the crisis itself.

== Report recommendations ==
=== Recommendations on high risk lending ===
1. Ensure "Qualified Mortgages" Are Low Risk. Federal regulators should use their regulatory authority to ensure that all mortgages deemed to be "qualified residential mortgages" have a low risk of delinquency or default.
2. Require Meaningful Risk Retention. Federal regulators should issue a strong risk retention requirement under Section 941 by requiring the retention of not less than a 5% credit risk in each, or a representative sample of, an asset backed securitization's tranches, and by barring a hedging offset for a reasonable but limited period of time.
3. Safeguard Against High Risk Products. Federal banking regulators should safeguard taxpayer dollars by requiring banks with high risk structured finance products, including complex products with little or no reliable performance data, to meet conservative loss reserve, liquidity, and capital requirements.
4. Require Greater Reserves for Negative Amortization Loans. Federal banking regulators should use their regulatory authority to require banks issuing negatively amortizing loans that allow borrowers to defer payments of interest and principal, to maintain more conservative loss, liquidity, and capital reserves.
5. Safeguard Bank Investment Portfolios. Federal banking regulators should use the Section 620 banking activities study to identify high risk structured finance products and impose a reasonable limit on the amount of such high risk products that can be included in a bank's investment portfolio.

=== Recommendations on regulatory failures ===
1. Complete OTS Dismantling. The Office of the Comptroller of the Currency (OCC) should complete the dismantling of the Office of Thrift Supervision (OTS), despite attempts by some OTS officials to preserve the agency's identity and influence within the OCC.
2. Strengthen Enforcement. Federal banking regulators should conduct a review of their major financial institutions to identify those with ongoing, serious deficiencies, and review their enforcement approach to those institutions to eliminate any policy of deference to bank management, inflated CAMELS ratings, or use of short term profits to excuse high risk activities.
3. Strengthen CAMELS Ratings. Federal banking regulators should undertake a comprehensive review of the CAMELS ratings system to produce ratings that signal whether an institution is expected operate in a safe and sound manner over a specified period of time, asset quality ratings that reflect embedded risks rather than short term profits, management ratings that reflect any ongoing failure to correct identified deficiencies, and composite ratings that discourage systemic risks.
4. Evaluate Impacts of High Risk Lending. The Financial Stability Oversight Council should undertake a study to identify high risk lending practices at financial institutions, and evaluate the nature and significance of the impacts that these practices may have on U.S. financial systems as a whole.

=== Recommendations on inflated credit ratings ===
1. Rank Credit Rating Agencies by Accuracy. The SEC should use its regulatory authority to rank the Nationally Recognized Statistical Rating Organizations in terms of performance, in particular the accuracy of their ratings.
2. Help Investors Hold CRAs Accountable. The SEC should use its regulatory authority to facilitate the ability of investors to hold credit rating agencies accountable in civil lawsuits for inflated credit ratings, when a credit rating agency knowingly or recklessly fails to conduct a reasonable investigation of the rated security.
3. Strengthen CRA Operations. The SEC should use its inspection, examination, and regulatory authority to ensure credit rating agencies institute internal controls, credit rating methodologies, and employee conflict of interest safeguards that advance rating accuracy.
4. Ensure CRAs Recognize Risk. The SEC should use its inspection, examination, and regulatory authority to ensure credit rating agencies assign higher risk to financial instruments whose performance cannot be reliably predicted due to their novelty or complexity, or that rely on assets from parties with a record for issuing poor quality assets.
5. Strengthen Disclosure. The SEC should exercise its authority under the new Section 78o-7(s) of Title 15 to ensure that the credit rating agencies complete the required new ratings forms by the end of the year and that the new forms provide comprehensible, consistent, and useful ratings information to investors, including by testing the proposed forms with actual investors.
6. Reduce Ratings Reliance. Federal regulators should reduce the federal government's reliance on privately issued credit ratings.

=== Recommendations on investment bank abuses ===
1. Review Structured Finance Transactions. Federal regulators should review the RMBS, CDO, CDS, and ABX activities described in this Report to identify any violations of law and to examine ways to strengthen existing regulatory prohibitions against abusive practices involving structured finance products.
2. Narrow Proprietary Trading Exceptions. To ensure a meaningful ban on proprietary trading under Section 619, any exceptions to that ban, such as for market-making or risk-mitigating hedging activities, should be strictly limited in the implementing regulations to activities that serve clients or reduce risk.
3. Design Strong Conflict of Interest Prohibitions. Regulators implementing the conflict of interest prohibitions in Sections 619 and 621 should consider the types of conflicts of interest in the Goldman Sachs case study, as identified in Chapter VI(C)(6) of this Report.
4. Study Bank Use of Structured Finance. Regulators conducting the banking activities study under Section 620 should consider the role of federally insured banks in designing, marketing, and investing in structured finance products with risks that cannot be reliably measured and naked credit default swaps or synthetic financial instruments.

== Impact and reactions ==
=== Media reaction ===
Although there was a massive scale of fraud and deception uncovered in the Levin-Coburn Report, the media's coverage of the report was timid. In an analysis of the media's coverage of the report, the Columbia Journalism Review criticizes the Wall Street Journal, the nation's foremost business newspaper, for its placement of the story in the third section of the day's paper, as well as its general dodging around the facts laid by and the criticisms made in the Report about Wall Street investment banks. On the other hand, the New York Times lauds how "The report adds significant new evidence to previously disclosed material showing that a wide swath of the financial industry chose profits over propriety during the mortgage lending spree." In his Rolling Stone op-ed, Wall Street investigative journalist Matt Taibbi, who once referred to Goldman Sachs as a "a great vampire squid wrapped around the face of humanity, relentlessly jamming its blood funnel into anything that smells like money.", applauds the "extraordinary investigative effort" by the Senate subcommittee. He decried the "aristocratic impunity and prosecutorial immunity "of Wall Street CEOs who facilitated the exploitation of the mortgage market and defrauding of American homeowners. Taibbi stated that the record $550 million fine the SEC charged to Goldman Sachs looks "woefully inadequate" after the findings of the Levin Report.

=== Wall Street reaction ===
In a company statement after the release of the report, Goldman said "While we disagree with many of the conclusions of the report, we take seriously the issues explored by the subcommittee. We recently issued the results of a comprehensive examination of our business standards and practices and committed to making significant changes that will strengthen relationships with clients, improve transparency and disclosure and enhance standards for the review, approval and suitability of complex instruments." In another press release, Goldman claimed that they " did not have access to any special information that caused us to know that the U.S. housing market would collapse." They claimed they had no bets against their clients, yet the Levin Report claims that there were over 3,000 instances of the term "net short" in internal e-mails looked at by investigators. No charges have been brought as of mid-2011.

=== Legislative reaction ===
See Dodd–Frank Wall Street Reform and Consumer Protection Act

== See also ==
- Wall Street reform
- 2008 financial crisis
- Subprime mortgage crisis solutions debate
- Regulatory responses to the subprime crisis
