= Arthur B. Culvahouse Jr. =

American diplomat (born 1948)

Arthur Culvahouse
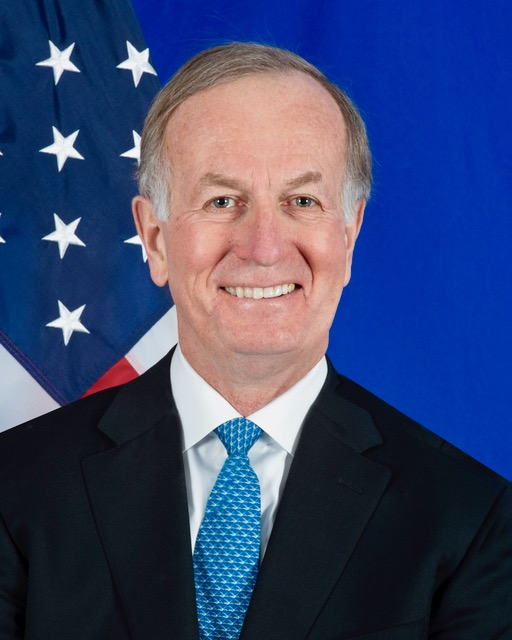

26th United States Ambassador to Australia
- In office March 13, 2019 – January 19, 2021
- President: Donald Trump
- Preceded by: John Berry
- Succeeded by: Caroline Kennedy

White House Counsel
- In office March 20, 1987 – January 20, 1989
- President: Ronald Reagan
- Preceded by: Peter Wallison
- Succeeded by: Boyden Gray

Personal details
- Born: Arthur Boggess Culvahouse Jr. July 4, 1948 (age 78) Ten Mile, Tennessee, U.S.
- Party: Republican
- Education: University of Tennessee (BS); New York University (JD)

Arthur Boggess Culvahouse Jr. (born July 4, 1948) is an American attorney who served as the United States Ambassador to Australia from 2019 to 2021.

He is the former Chair of O'Melveny & Myers, an international law firm of more than 1,000 lawyers with offices around the world. Culvahouse also served as counsel to Ronald Reagan in the last two years of his presidency, and was entrusted by John McCain and Donald Trump to vet their vice presidential candidates.

Trump appointed Culvahouse as the U.S. Ambassador to Australia in November 2018, and the Senate confirmed him in January 2019. He presented his credentials to the Governor-General of Australia, Sir Peter Cosgrove, on March 13, 2019.

== Early life and education ==
Culvahouse was born in Ten Mile, Tennessee, the son of Ruth (Wear) and Arthur Boggess Culvahouse. He graduated in 1970 with a Bachelor of Science from the University of Tennessee and in 1973 as a Juris Doctor from the New York University School of Law.

From 1973 to 1976, Culvahouse was Chief Legislative Assistant/Counsel to Senator Howard H. Baker Jr. He practiced law with O'Melveny & Myers from 1976 to 1984, and again from 1989 until 2018.

== Career ==
=== Reagan Chief Counsel ===
From 1987 to 1989, Culvahouse served as counsel to U.S. President Ronald Reagan. As White House Counsel, he advised the President on matters ranging from Iran-Contra investigations, to the Supreme Court nominations of Robert Bork and Anthony Kennedy, to the legal aspects of the Intermediate-Range Nuclear Forces Treaty.

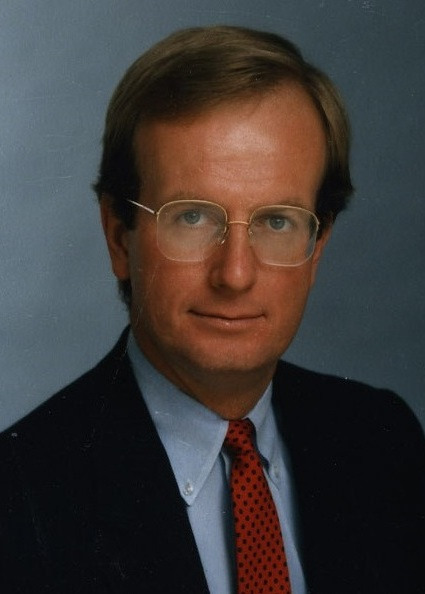
Reagan administration photograph of Culvahouse

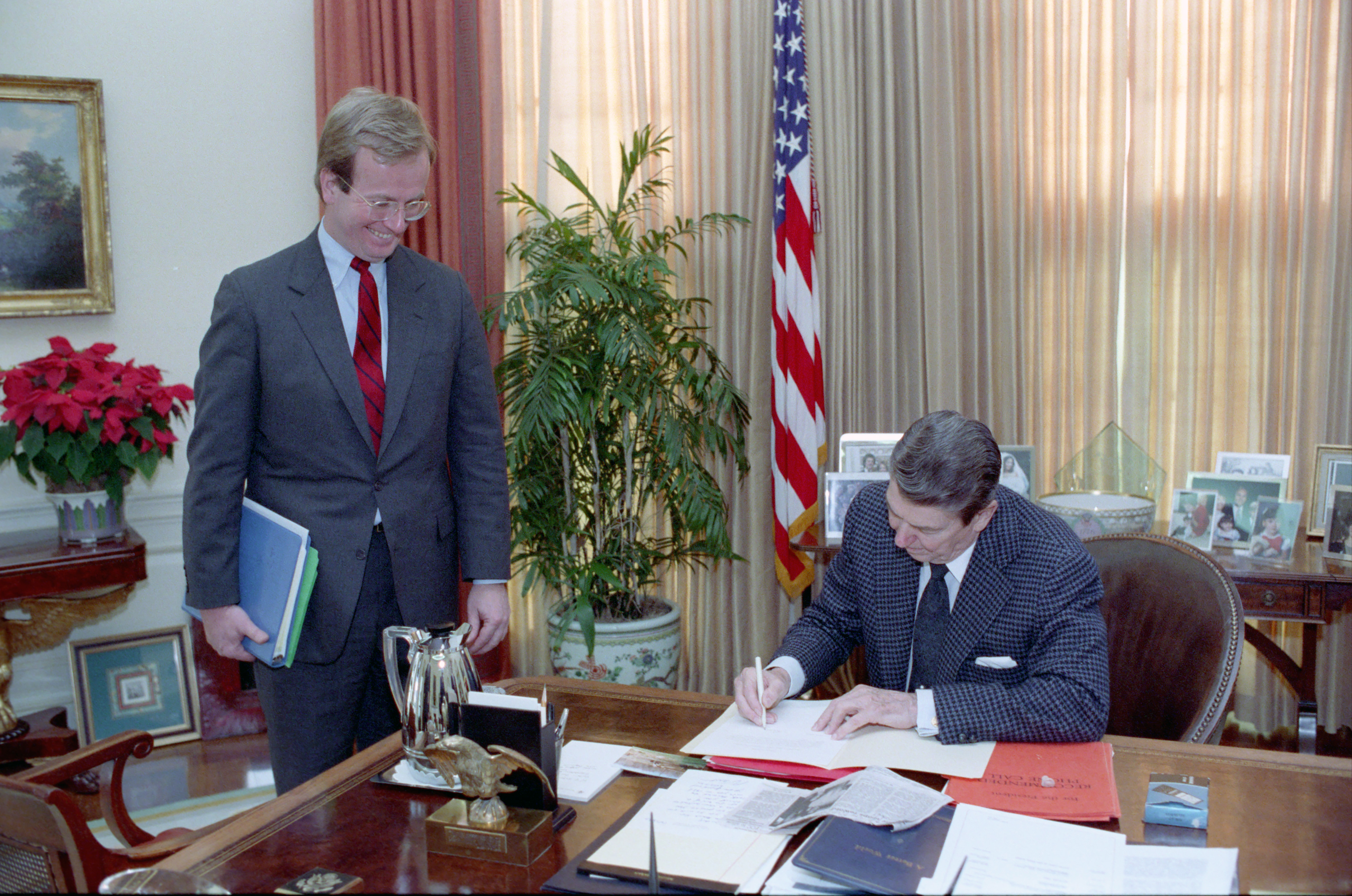
Culvahouse with President Ronald Reagan in the Oval Office, 1987

Culvahouse served as Bork's "handler" during his rejected Senate confirmation hearings for the Supreme Court.

In January 1989, Reagan awarded Culvahouse the Presidential Citizens’ Medal, an award established in 1969 to "recognize citizens who performed exemplary deeds of service for the country or their fellow citizens."

=== Post-White House ===
From 1990 to 1992, Culvahouse served as a member of the Federal Advisory Committee on Nuclear Failsafe and Risk Reduction, appointed by Secretary of Defense Dick Cheney, to evaluate and recommend improvements in the United States' nuclear command and control system.

In December 1992, Cheney awarded Culvahouse the Defense Medal for Distinguished Public Service. Culvahouse's prior service on boards and commissions includes service on the Supreme Court Fellows Commission (2002–2005), the Board of Visitors of the U.S. Naval Academy (1989–1991), and the Counterintelligence Advisory Panel to the U.S. Senate Select Committee on Intelligence (1989–1990).

Prior to his appointed as U.S. Ambassador to Australia Culvahouse was a member of the Brookings Institution Board of Trustees, and the Leadership Board of the Center for Capital Markets Competitiveness.

==== McCain campaign ====
In May 2008, Culvahouse was chosen to head presumptive Republican presidential nominee John McCain's search for a vice presidential running mate, the first time that Culvahouse had ever been involved in a presidential campaign. At the same time, he won a third four-year term to the chairmanship of his law firm. Culvahouse was mentioned in the ABA Journal as a possible Attorney General in a John McCain presidency, because "a lot of Democrats in Washington respect him and he has private access to a lot of ears on Capitol Hill."

McCain's pick of Sarah Palin for vice president led to controversy over the vetting process. In 2009, Culvahouse defended his vetting in a speech to the Republican National Lawyers Association: Palin "had a lot of capacity. The mistake I made -- and we've laughed about it since -- after giving [McCain] that advice, he said, 'Well, what's your bottom line?' I said, 'John. High risk, high reward.' And his response, ‘You shouldn't have told me that, I've been a risk-taker all of my life.'"

“Me and two of my most cynical partners interviewed [Palin], and came away impressed,” Culvahouse said.

==== Trump campaign ====
In May 2016, Donald Trump, the presumptive Republican presidential nominee, chose Culvahouse to head the search for his running mate.

=== Ambassador to Australia ===
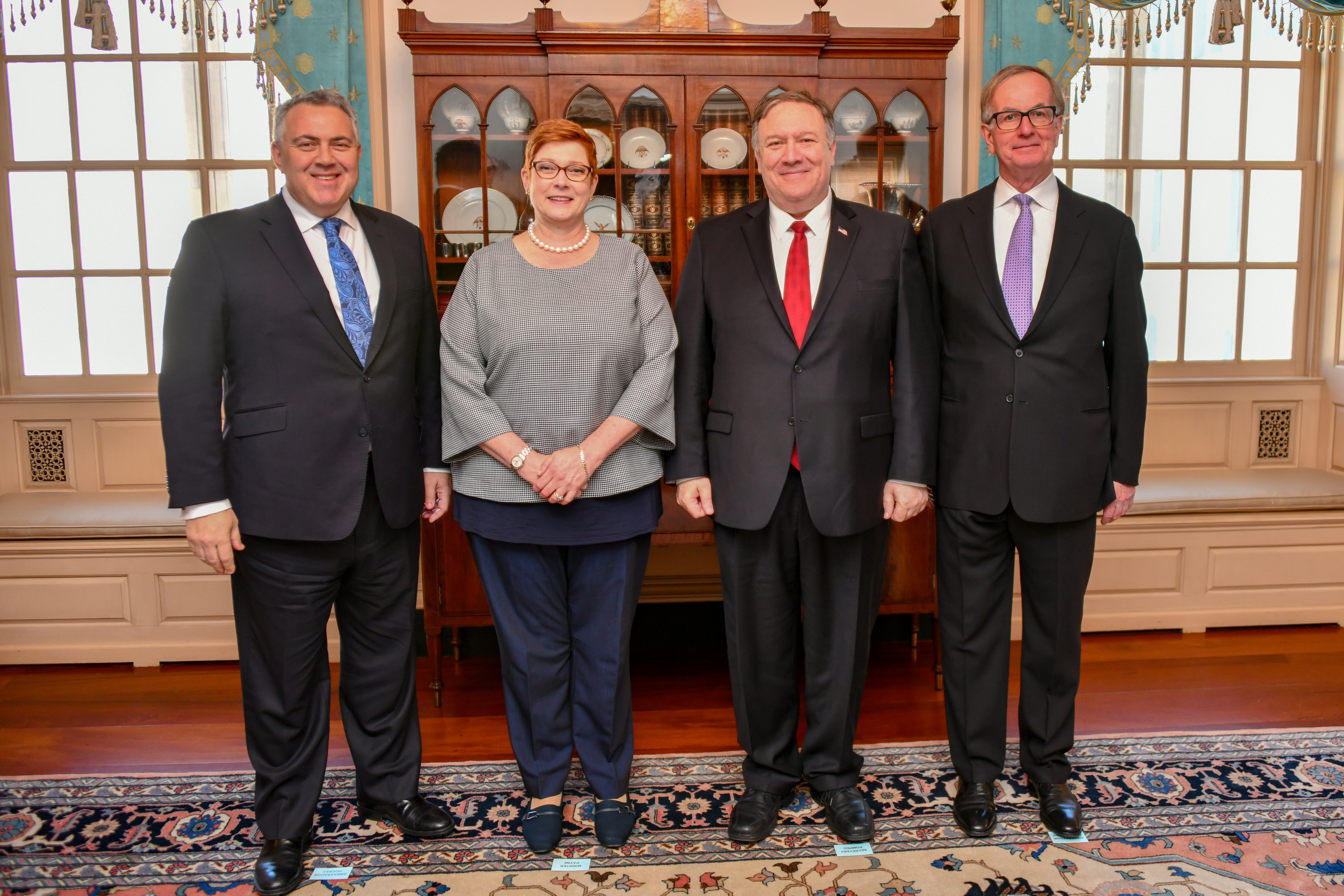
Culvahouse with Secretary of State Mike Pompeo, Joe Hockey, and Marise Payne, 2019

On 6 November 2018, Trump nominated Culvahouse as the next United States Ambassador to Australia, to fill a post that had been vacant since John Berry left the post in September 2016. The appointment was confirmed by the Senate on 2 January 2019. On March 13, 2019, his credentials were accepted by the Governor-General of Australia, Sir Peter Cosgrove. He left office in January 2021, at the end of Trump's term.

Legal offices
Preceded by Peter Wallison	White House Counsel; 1987–1989	Succeeded by Boyden Gray
Diplomatic posts
Preceded by John Berry	United States Ambassador to Australia; 2019–2021	Succeeded by Caroline Kennedy
