= Peter J. Wallison =

American attorney (born 1941)

Peter Wallison
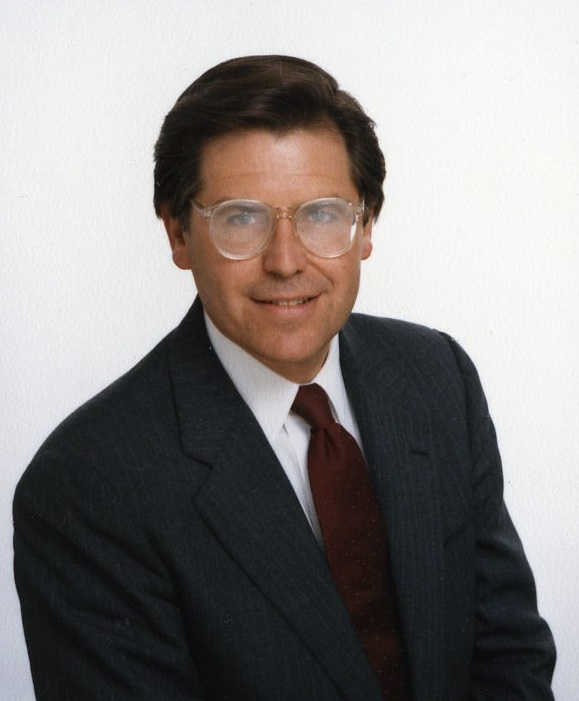

White House Counsel
- In office May 23, 1986 – March 20, 1987
- President: Ronald Reagan
- Preceded by: Fred Fielding
- Succeeded by: Arthur Culvahouse

Personal details
- Born: June 6, 1941 (age 85) New York City, New York, U.S.
- Party: Republican
- Spouse: Frieda Wallison
- Children: 3
- Education: Harvard University (BA, LLB)

Peter J. Wallison (born June 6, 1941) is an American lawyer and the Arthur F. Burns Fellow in Financial Policy Studies at the American Enterprise Institute. He specializes in financial markets deregulation. He was White House Counsel during the Tower Commission's inquiry into the Iran Contra Affair. He was a dissenting member of the 2010 Financial Crisis Inquiry Commission, frequent commentator in the mass media on the federal takeover of Fannie Mae and Freddie Mac and the 2008 financial crisis and wrote Hidden in Plain Sight (2015) about the crisis and its legacy.

== Biography ==
Wallison was born in New York City, and educated at the Capitol Page School and Harvard University, where he received his B.A. in 1963, an LL.B. in 1966, and was the president of the Young Republicans. He was admitted to the bar of New York state in 1967.

Emanuel Celler appointed him a United States House of Representatives Page when he was about 14, and he served for most of his high school years. The Democrats controlled the patronage, but assigned some pages, such as Wallison, to the minority party. This experience helped him become a Republican.

He was a Rockefeller Republican before becoming a Reagan Republican.

On November 24, 1966, he married the former Frieda Koslow (born in New York January 15, 1943, A.B. Smith College 1963, LL.B. Harvard Law School 1966 admitted to New York bar in 1967, D.C. bar 1982). They have three children, Ethan S., Jeremy L., Rebecca K. Mrs. Wallison develops real estate in Snowmass, Colorado.

They split their time between homes in Colorado and in Washington, D.C.

== Career ==
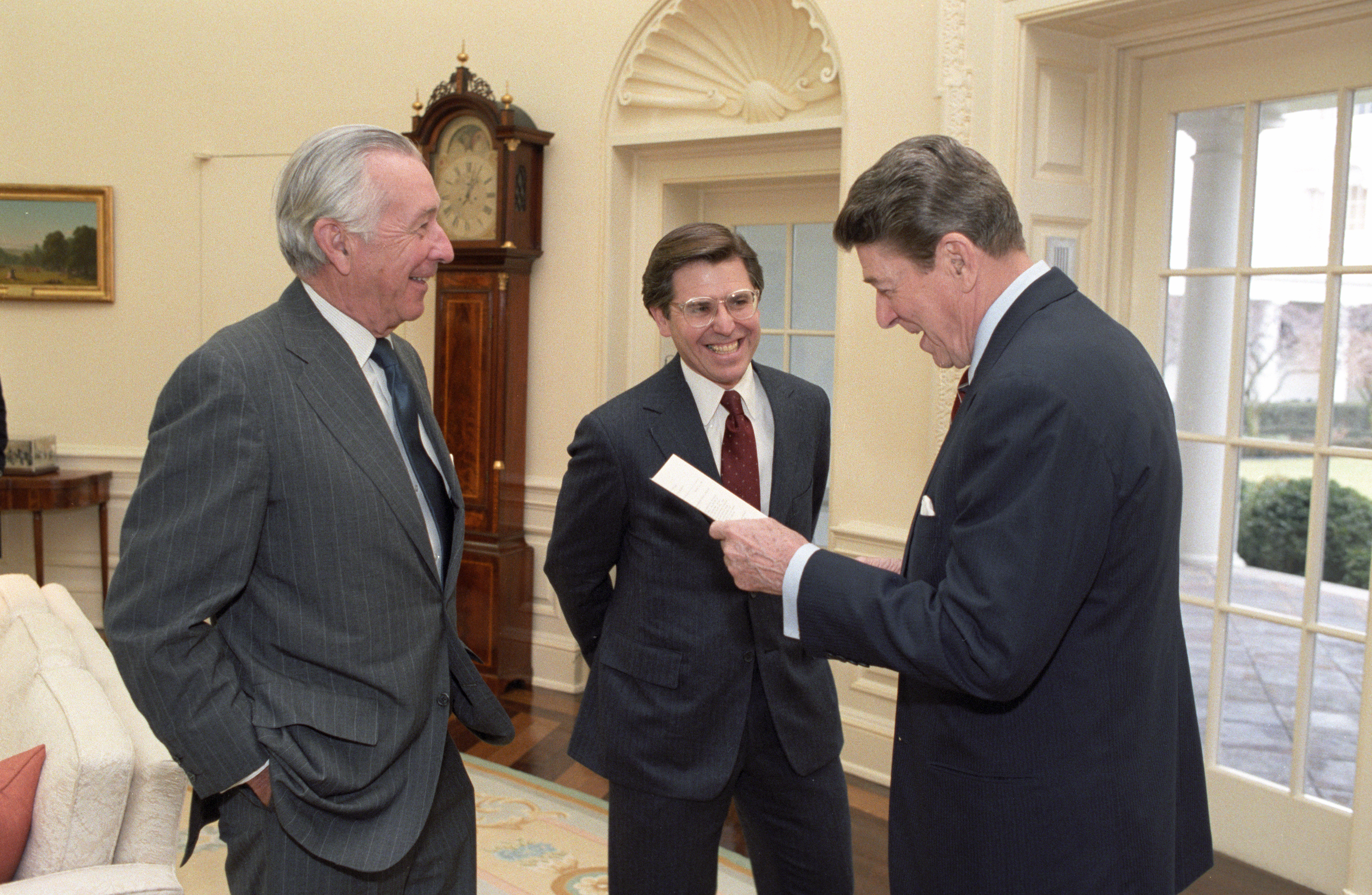
Wallison with President Ronald Reagan and Donald Regan in 1986

- 1966–1971 Associate, Rogers & Wells, New York, NY
- 1971–____ special assistant, Governor of New York Nelson A. Rockefeller
- 1971–1981 Partner, Rogers & Wells, New York, NY
- 1972–1976 Special assistant to Nelson Rockefeller
- 1973–1974 Counsel to the Commission on Critical Choices for Americans
- 1975–1976 Counsel to Vice President of the United States Nelson Rockefeller. Dick Parsons was his deputy.
- 1976 Campaign staff, Bob Dole's vice-presidential campaign
- 1981–1985 General Counsel for the Department of the Treasury, under Don Regan. Early in his tenure he supervised the preparation of the report on the Secret Service and the Reagan assassination attempt in 1981. He was important in developing Reagan administration proposals to deregulate financial services that, with some changes, became law in 1999. Wallison recounts that he counseled against the Reagan administration's decision to oppose the Fourth Circuit Court of Appeals ruling that the Carter administration's Internal Revenue Service revocation of Bob Jones University's tax exempt status because its prohibition against inter-racial dating by students violated public policy. Even if the IRS had determined policy, beyond its authority in deciding, opposing this case would be politically foolish. In the event he was recalled to the United States from a banking conference to be present for the Treasury's announcement; when he arrived he found that his seniors were all absent and he was required to announce this choice. Treasury and Department of Justice had worked this out between themselves, and White House staff were furious. A political firestorm followed, and efforts to mitigate it were unsuccessful. (The Supreme Court of the United States subsequently held, in Bob Jones University v. United States, that the IRS did have this power even though petitioner had complied with the language of the statute).
- 1985–1986 partner, Gibson, Dunn & Crutcher
- 1986–1987 White House Counsel to President of the United States Ronald Reagan. In the aftermath of the Iran Contra affair he came under investigation by Lawrence E. Walsh but was not indicted. (He believes his diary persuaded the independent counsel that he had not manipulated the President's testimony.)
- 1987–1998 partner, Gibson, Dunn & Crutcher
- 1999–present American Enterprise Institute, codirector of AEI's financial markets deregulation project.

== Other ==
In 1999, Wallison told New York Times reporter Steven A. Holmes that the expansion of mortgage loans by reducing the amount borrowers have to put down and extending loans to so-called subprime borrowers was creating a situation where Fannie Mae was taking on significantly more risk. "From the perspective of many people, including me, this is another thrift industry growing up around us," he said. "If they fail, the government will have to step up and bail them out the way it stepped up and bailed out the thrift industry." The article pointed out that the Clinton Administration had put pressure on Fannie Mae to lower standards "to expand loans among low and moderate income people."

Wallison gave a eulogy at a memorial service for Don Regan in June 2003.

Wallison's writing on the cause of the 2008 financial crisis have brought much comment. In December, 2011, the New York Times financial columnist Joe Nocera stated that Wallison had "almost single-handedly created the myth that Fannie Mae and Freddie Mac caused the financial crisis." Calling it "a big lie," Nocera suggested that Wallison had engaged in a deliberate deception. Economist Paul Krugman has also accused Wallison of deception, criticizing him for—among other things—attacking Fannie and Freddie in a magazine article just a year before the subprime mortgage collapse for not doing a "better job of providing affordable home financing to a neglected portion of the mortgage market." This neglected portion consisted of "African-American ... Hispanic", and "low-income borrowers". Wallison cites New York Times columnist Gretchen Morgenson exposing how "Democratic political operative Jim Johnson turned Fannie Mae into a political machine", and dismisses the exoneration of the GSEs as "the big lie."

== Memberships ==
- Shadow Financial Regulatory Committee
- Council on Foreign Relations
- Depository Institutions Deregulation Committee (past member) under Depository Institutions Deregulation and Monetary Control Act (1980) with William Isaac amongst others
- District of Columbia bar
- District of Columbia bar association
- MGIC board of directors, until Fannie Mae applied pressure.
- President's Advisory Council on Executive Organization, also called the Ash Commission
- Delegate, 1976 Republican National Convention
- Member and dissenter on Financial Crisis Inquiry Commission (2010–11)

== Writings ==
- (With John D. Hawke, Jr.) The State Banking Revolution and the Federal Response: New Frontiers of Financial Service Expansion, Law and Business/Harcourt Brace Jovanovich (Clifton, NJ), 1984.
- State Banking Regulation and Deregulation, Law and Business/Harcourt Brace Jovanovich (New York, NY), 1985.
- Back from the Brink: A Practical Plan for Privatizing Deposit Insurance and Strengthening Our Banks and Thrifts, AEI Press (Washington, DC), 1990.
- (With Bert Ely) Nationalizing Mortgage Risk: The Growth of Fannie Mae and Freddie Mac, AEI Press (Washington, DC), 2000.
- (With Robert E. Litan) The GAAP Gap, AEI Press (Washington, DC), 2000.
- (Editor) Optional Federal Chartering and Regulation of Insurance Companies, AEI Press (Washington, DC), 2000.
- "Statement for Roundtable Discussion on H.R. 3703" (PDF). House Banking Committee Subcommittee on Capital Markets. 2000-09-06. Archived from the original (PDF) on 2003-05-06.
- (Editor) Fannie Mae and Freddie Mac: Public Purposes and Private Interests, Volume 1: Government Subsidy and Conflicting Missions, Volume 2: Prospects for Controlling Growth and Expansion, AEI Press (Washington, DC), 2000, ISBN 0-8447-7137-6 (alk. paper), ISBN 0-8447-7138-4
- (Editor) Serving Two Masters, Yet out of Control: Fannie Mae and Freddie Mac, AEI Press (Washington, DC), 2001, ISBN 0-8447-4166-3 (pbk.)
- Serving Two Masters, Yet Out of Control: Fannie Mae and Freddie Mac. Peter J. Wallison, editor. American Enterprise Institute. 2001. ISBN 978-0-8447-4166-6. 2 volumes of papers delivered at a conference on March 24, 1999 at the American Enterprise Institute, Washington, D.C.
- Ronald Reagan: The Power of Conviction and the Success of His Presidency. Cambridge, Massachusetts: Westview Press. 2003. p. 106. ISBN 978-0-8133-4046-3. "wallison dunn crutcher."
- "A Man Apart: Reagan had the right principles – and he stuck to them". nationalreview.com. 2004-06-05. Archived from the original on 2004-06-18.
- Competitive Equity: A Better Way to Organize Mutual Funds (AEI Press, 2007).
- "Escape from New York". The American. American Enterprise Institute. 2008-02-20. Archived from the original on 2008-03-14.
- Contributor to periodicals, including the Wall Street Journal, New York Times, and Washington Post.

"Elitist Protection Consumers Don't Need". The Washington Post. 2009-07-13.
"Obama Voted 'Present' on Mortgage Reform. The only banking 'deregulation' in recent years was that of Fan and Fred". Opinion Journal. 2008-10-15. Archived from the original on 2008-10-15.
"How Paulson Would Save Fannie Mae". The Wall Street Journal. 2008-09-12. Archived from the original on 2008-09-14.
"Reagan and McCain". American Spectator. 2008-01-08. Archived from the original on 2008-10-24.
"What We Pre-Empted - Today's world would be far worse if Saddam were still in power". Opinion Journal. Wall Street Journal. 2007-07-11.
"Reagan, Iraq, and Neoconservatism". American Spectator. 2004-04-16. Archived from the original on 2008-10-23.
"Bush's Reagan Moment". The New York Times. 2003-10-26. Archived from the original on January 19, 2011.

- Hidden in Plain Sight: What Really Caused the World's Worst Financial Crisis and Why It Could Happen Again (Encounter Books; January 13, 2015), 432 pages; ISBN 1-5940-3770-1; ISBN 978-1-5940-3770-2

Legal offices
Preceded by Fred Fielding	White House Counsel; 1986–1987	Succeeded by Arthur Culvahouse
