= Elaine D. Kaplan =

American judge (born 1955)

Elaine Kaplan
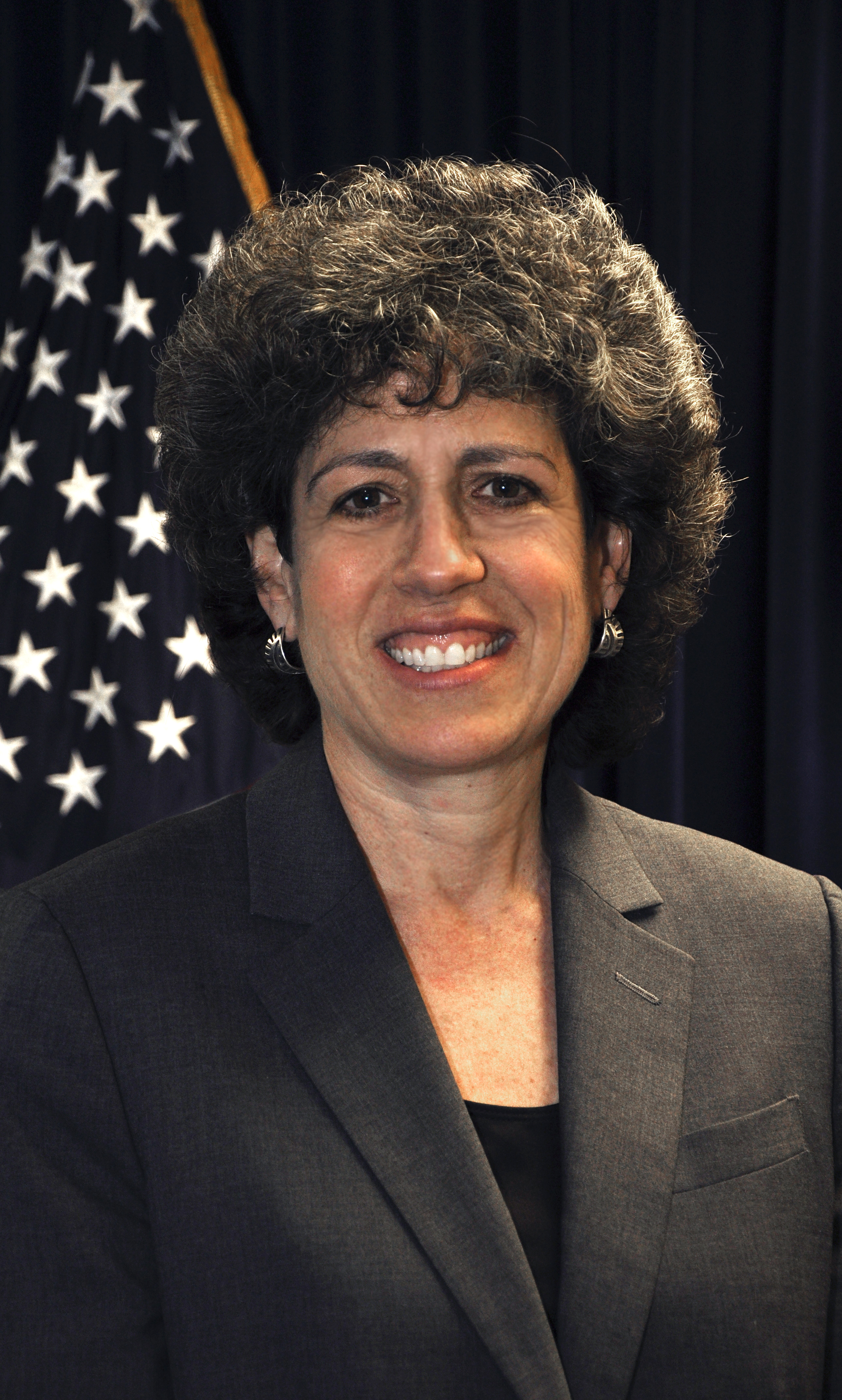

Chief Judge of the United States Court of Federal Claims
- In office March 2, 2021 – April 10, 2025
- Appointed by: Joe Biden
- Preceded by: Eleni M. Roumel
- Succeeded by: Matthew H. Solomson

Judge of the United States Court of Federal Claims
- Incumbent
- Assumed office November 6, 2013
- Appointed by: Barack Obama
- Preceded by: Christine Miller

Director of the Office of Personnel Management
- Acting
- In office April 13, 2013 – November 4, 2013
- President: Barack Obama
- Preceded by: John Berry
- Succeeded by: Katherine Archuleta

Personal details
- Born: December 18, 1955 (age 70) New York City, New York, U.S.
- Party: Democratic
- Education: Binghamton University (BA); Georgetown University (JD)

Elaine Debra Kaplan (born December 18, 1955) is a judge of the United States Court of Federal Claims. She served as General Counsel of the United States Office of Personnel Management from 2009 to 2013, and as acting director of the office in 2013.

== Early life and career ==
Kaplan was born in 1955 in Brooklyn, New York. She received a Bachelor of Arts degree in 1976 from Binghamton University. She received a Juris Doctor, cum laude, in 1979, from the Georgetown University Law Center.

She began her career as a staff attorney in the Solicitor's Office of the United States Department of Labor. From 1984–98, she worked for the National Treasury Employees Union (NTEU), with increasing levels of responsibility. In 1998, she was unanimously confirmed by the Senate to serve as the head of the United States Office of Special Counsel and served five years in that position.

From 2003 to 2004, she served as of counsel at the law firm of Bernabei and Katz. From 2004–09, she served as Senior Deputy General Counsel at the NTEU. From 2009–13, she was the General Counsel of the United States Office of Personnel Management. Kaplan took the office of Acting Director in April 2013, after Director John Berry's four-year term expired.

=== Claims court service ===
On March 19, 2013, President Barack Obama nominated Kaplan to serve as a Judge of the United States Court of Federal Claims, to the seat vacated by Judge Christine Odell Cook Miller.

The Senate Judiciary Committee held a hearing on her nomination on May 8, 2013, and reported her nomination to the floor by voice vote on June 6, 2013. Her nomination was confirmed on September 17, 2013, by a 64–35 vote. She took the oath of office from Chief Judge Patricia E. Campbell-Smith on November 6, 2013. On March 2, 2021, President Joe Biden designated Kaplan as Chief Judge.

== Personal life ==
Kaplan is open about her lesbian identity.

== See also ==
- List of LGBT jurists in the United States

Political offices
Preceded by John Berry	Director of the Office of Personnel Management; Acting; 2013	Succeeded by Katherine Archuleta
Legal offices
Preceded by Christine Miller	Judge of the United States Court of Federal Claims; 2013–present	Incumbent
Preceded by Eleni M. Roumel	Chief Judge of the United States Court of Federal Claims; 2021–2025	Succeeded by Matthew H. Solomson
