= David Schwartz (judge) =

American judge (1916-1989)

Senior Judge of the United States Court of Federal Claims
- In office October 8, 1982 – December 21, 1989

Judge of the United States Court of Federal Claims
- In office October 1, 1982 – October 8, 1982
- Appointed by: operation of law
- Preceded by: seat established
- Succeeded by: Christine Odell Cook Miller

Personal details
- Born: July 7, 1916 New York City, New York, U.S.
- Died: December 21, 1989 (aged 73) Washington, D.C., U.S.
- Education: New York University (AB); Harvard University (LLB)

David Schwartz (July 7, 1916 – December 21, 1989) was a judge of the United States Court of Claims from 1968 to 1982.

== Biography ==
Born in New York City, Schwartz received a Bachelor of Arts from New York University in 1936, and a Bachelor of Laws from Harvard Law School in 1939. He then entered private practice in New York City until 1941, when he began a series of government positions. He was an attorney in the U.S. Department of Justice, first for the Board of Immigration Appeals in 1941, and then for the Alien Enemy Control Unit in 1942. From 1942 to 1943, he was a law clerk to Justice Stanley F. Reed.

He was the principal attorney of the Foreign Economic Administration from 1943 to 1944, and was then legal advisor to the Balkan and Greece missions of the United Nations Relief and Rehabilitation Administration from 1944 to 1945. He returned to the Department of Justice as a trial attorney in the Office of Alien Property from 1945 to 1957, and in the Antitrust Division from 1957 to 1958. He then served as general counsel of the Development and Resources Corporation from 1958 to 1959, and as a partner in the Manhattan law firm of Stroock & Stroock & Lavan from 1960 to 1968.

In 1968, Schwartz became a trial judge of the U.S. Court of Claims. On October 1, 1982, he was appointed by operation of the Federal Courts Improvement Act, 96 Stat. 27, to a new seat on the United States Court of Federal Claims. Schwartz assumed senior status on October 8, 1982, serving in that capacity until his death in Washington, D.C.

== See also ==
- List of law clerks for the sixth seat of the Supreme Court of the United States
