= United States Senate Homeland Security Permanent Subcommittee on Investigations =

U.S. congressional committee

The Permanent Subcommittee on Investigations (PSI), formed in March 1941 as the "Truman Committee," is the oldest subcommittee of the United States Senate Committee on Homeland Security and Governmental Affairs (formerly the Committee on Government Operations). After the September 11, 2001, terrorist attacks in the United States, the Committee broadened its title to Homeland Security and Governmental Affairs Committee. PSI led the Committee's broad mandate to "investigate inefficiency, mismanagement, and corruption in Government."

== History ==
The Truman Committee (itself successor to the Nye Committee 1934–1936) stood up from March 1941 to 1948. The Investigations Subcommittee of the Committee on Expenditures in Executive Departments took over two key aspects of the Truman Committee. First, Investigations Subcommittee took the Truman Committee's investigation of war contracts and procurement of the Hughes XF-11 reconnaissance aircraft and the Hughes H-4 Hercules flying boat (Spruce Goose). Second, the subcommittee also assumed responsibility for the records of the Truman Committee.

Under the chairmanship of Homer S. Ferguson of Michigan (1948) and Clyde R. Hoey of North Carolina (1949-1952), the Investigations Subcommittee of the Committee on Expenditures in Executive Departments held hearings on such matters as export control violations, for which Soviet spy William Remington was called in to testify; the trial of Nazi war criminal Ilse Koch; and the Mississippi Democratic Party's sale of postal jobs, which Mississippians from rural areas attested to purchasing. A much larger scandal erupted with the "5 percenters", so-called because these men, including Presidential aide Harry H. Vaughan, were accused of charging a 5% commission for their influence in securing government contracts. A legislative reform as a result of the hearings was a restriction of one year after leaving government employment before an attorney could practice law again before the government.

=== Korean War atrocities ===
As news of war crimes during the Korean War unfolded, the Subcommittee on Korean War Atrocities was headed by Charles E. Potter, and began an investigation of the abuse and murder of prisoners of war such as forced marches, maltreatments, and the shooting and murdering of prisoners shortly after capture.

=== Joseph McCarthy ===
In the 83rd United States Congress, the subcommittee (now known as the Permanent Subcommittee on Investigations or PSI), under its new chairman, Joseph McCarthy of Wisconsin, greatly increased the number of investigations and number of witnesses called. His subcommittee held 169 hearings throughout 1953 and 1954. Of the 653 people called by the Committee during a 15-month period, 83 refused to answer questions about espionage and subversion on constitutional grounds and their names were made public. Nine additional witnesses invoked the Fifth Amendment to the United States Constitution in executive session and their names were not made public. Some of the 83 were working or had worked for the Army, the Navy, the Government Printing Office, the Department of the Treasury, the Office of War Information, and the Office of Strategic Services. Others were or had been employed at the Federal Telecommunications Laboratories in New Jersey, the secret radar laboratories of the Army Signal Corps in New Jersey, and General Electric defense plants in Massachusetts and New York. Nineteen of the 83, including well known communist party members James S. Allen, Herbert Aptheker, and Earl Browder, were summoned because their writings were being carried in United States Information Agency libraries around the world.

The hearings also investigated such matters as communist infiltration of the United Nations; Korean War atrocities; and the transfer to the Soviet Union of occupation currency plates. From December 1952 to July 1953, Robert F. Kennedy was an assistant counsel of PSI.

In April 1954, McCarthy's exchange of charges with Secretary of the Army Robert T. Stevens led to the appointment of a special subcommittee of the PSI to investigate the charges. Chaired by Karl E. Mundt of South Dakota, the proceedings became known as the Army–McCarthy hearings.

=== Labor racketeering and organized crime ===
From 1955 until 1972, John Little McClellan of Arkansas chaired the PSI. McClellan continued extensive hearings of the Army Signal Corps at Fort Monmouth, New Jersey, and added new inquiries relating to communist activities in the United States and to business activities and alleged improper activities by Eisenhower Administration appointees and political associates. In the 86th Congress (1957), members of the Subcommittee were joined by Members of the Committee on Labor and Public Welfare on a special committee (the Select Committee on Improper Activities in Labor and Management) to investigate labor racketeering. Chaired by Senator McClellan and staffed by Robert F. Kennedy, the Subcommittee's chief counsel, and other staff members, this special committee directed much of its attention to criminal influence over the International Brotherhood of Teamsters, most famously calling Teamsters' leaders Dave Beck and Jimmy Hoffa to testify. The televised hearings of the special committee also introduced Senators Barry Goldwater and John F. Kennedy to the nation, as well as leading to passage of the Labor Management Reporting and Disclosure Act.

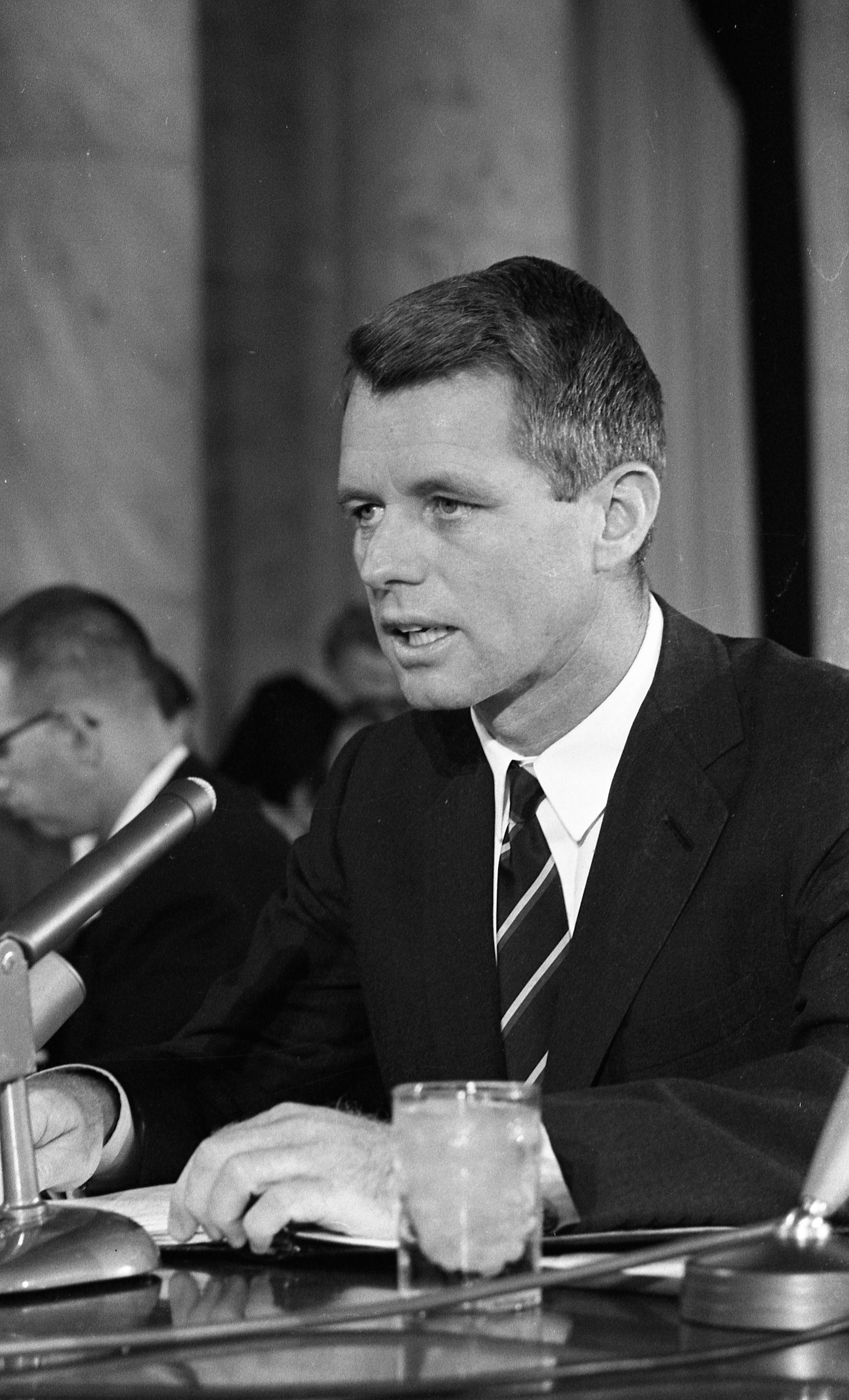
Attorney General Robert F. Kennedy testifying before the subcommittee about organized crime, September 1963

After the select committee expired in 1960, the PSI continued to investigate labor racketeering and other labor-related matters. From 1961 through 1968, it also investigated gambling and organized crime in which Joseph Valachi testified about the activities of the Sicilian Mafia, the Billie Sol Estes case, irregularities in missile procurement, procurement of the General Dynamics F-111 Aardvark fighter plane, excessive risks in underwriting Federal Housing Administration mortgages, riots, and civil disorders, the Agency for International Development commodity import program, and procurement of railway bridges for South Vietnam under the counter-insurgency program. The Subcommittee's investigations also led to passage of major legislation against organized crime, most notably the Racketeer Influenced and Corrupt Organizations Act ("RICO act"), which is a section of the Organized Crime Control Act passed in 1970.

In 1973, Senator Henry M. Jackson, a Democrat from Washington, replaced McClellan as the Subcommittee's chairman and Senator Charles H. Percy, an Illinois Republican, became the Ranking Minority Member. During Senator Jackson's chairmanship, the Subcommittee conducted landmark hearings into energy shortages and the operation of the petroleum industry.

=== Nunn-Roth era ===
The regular reversals of political fortunes in the Senate of the 1980s and 1990s saw Senator Sam Nunn trade chairmanship three times with Delaware Republican William V. Roth Jr. Nunn served from 1979 to 1980 and again from 1987 to 1995, while Roth served from 1981 to 1986, and again from 1995 to 1996. Senator Roth led a wide range of investigations into commodity investment fraud, off-shore banking schemes, money laundering, and child pornography. Senator Nunn inquired into federal drug policy, the global spread of chemical and biological weapons, abuses in Federal Student Aid programs, computer security, aviation safety, and health care fraud.

=== Federal financial aid and proprietary colleges ===
In the early 1970s, student loan programs created by the Higher Education Act of 1965 and subsequent legislation had begun to produce evidence of fraud, abuse, and mismanagement. In November 1975, the Permanent Subcommittee held four days of hearings that followed on staff investigations that focused largely on West Coast Schools, a for-profit school that had grown quickly with federal loan money and closed after questions were raised about its operations. Secretary of Education Ted Bell told the Subcommittee "It must be kept in mind that when the floodgates were opened in 1968 to allow virtually every kind of institution operating on an interstate basis to lend under the program—public, private, profit, nonprofit, noncollegiate, and correspondence schools—we had only 50 persons on the staff."

In the late 1980s, skyrocketing student loan defaults led the Permanent Subcommittee to again examine the federal student aid programs. After an 18-month investigation and a series of hearings, the Subcommittee concluded that the student loan program, "particularly as it relates to proprietary schools, is riddled with fraud, waste and abuse." Following on the Subcommittee's work, Congress adopted amendments to the Higher Education Act that contributed to the closure of hundreds of schools. The reforms included cutting off federal aid at schools with high default rates; prohibiting the use of commission-based sales agents in recruiting; and limiting federal funding to no more than 85 percent of any for-profit college's revenue. Senator Nunn, as chair of the Permanent Subcommittee, also worked to include reforms of state oversight of colleges participating in the federal aid programs. Those reforms were adopted but were subsequently repealed before being implemented.

=== Tenures of Collins, Levin, and Coleman ===
In January 1997 Republican Senator Susan Collins of Maine became the first woman to chair the Permanent Subcommittee on Investigations. Her Chairmanship was also notable in that she held the Senate seat of former Maine Senator Margaret Chase Smith, an opponent of Senator McCarthy. Senator John Glenn of Ohio became Ranking Member. Upon Senator Glenn's retirement from the Senate, Senator Carl Levin became Ranking Member in 1999. In June 2001, when the Democrats resumed control of the Senate, Senator Levin assumed the chairmanship of the Subcommittee until January 2003 when Senator Norm Coleman assumed the Chairmanship. When the Democrats took control of the Senate in January 2007, the chairmanship reverted to Senator Levin.

=== Oil-for-Food Program Hearings ===
In December 2004, Coleman called for Secretary-General of the United Nations Kofi Annan to resign because of the "UN's utter failure to detect or stop Saddam's abuses" in the Oil-for-Food Programme and because of fraud allegations against Kojo Annan, his son, relating to the same program. In May 2005 the subcommittee held Oil-for-Food Program Hearings to investigate abuses of the Oil-for-Food program, including oil smuggling, illegal kickbacks and use of surcharges, and Saddam Hussein's use of oil vouchers for the purpose of buying influence abroad. These hearings covered certain corporations, including Bayoil Inc., and Russian politician Vladimir Zhirinovsky. The hearings received significant media attention for the combative appearance of British politician George Galloway of the Respect Party, in which he forcefully rejected the allegations.

=== Homeland Security ===
In 2003, after the Homeland Security Act of 2002 established the Department of Homeland Security (DHS), the Committee took over the primary oversight of designing policies, operations, and function of the DHS. In this aspect of its role, the Committee has introduced and passed a number of bills to improve the DHS and ensure the country's safety, including the Homeland Security Act. The Committee was also tasked with the implementation of the 9/11 Commission recommendations, the investigations after Hurricane Katrina, and the National Intelligence Reform Act, which revised the intelligence system and created the Office of the Director of National Intelligence in 2004.

=== Wall Street and the 2008 financial crisis ===
On April 13, 2011, the Committee released its report on Wall Street and the Financial Crisis: Anatomy of a Financial Collapse. The 635-page bipartisan report was issued under the chairmanship of Carl Levin and Tom Coburn and also thus referred as the Levin-Coburn Report. It represents an in-depth investigation as well as a permanent record of the 2008 financial crisis and took over two years of research and investigations to compile. It found "that the crisis was not a natural disaster, but the result of high risk, complex financial products; undisclosed conflicts of interest; and the failure of regulators, the credit rating agencies, and the market itself to rein in the excesses of Wall Street."

== Members, 119th Congress ==
Majority	Minority
Ron Johnson, Wisconsin, Chair; James Lankford, Oklahoma; Bernie Moreno, Ohio; Rick Scott, Florida; Josh Hawley, Missouri	Richard Blumenthal, Connecticut, Ranking Member; Maggie Hassan, New Hampshire; John Fetterman, Pennsylvania; Andy Kim, New Jersey
Ex officio
Rand Paul, Kentucky	Gary Peters, Michigan

== Historical subcommittee rosters ==
=== 118th Congress ===
Majority	Minority
Richard Blumenthal, Connecticut, Chair; Tom Carper, Delaware; Maggie Hassan, New Hampshire; Alex Padilla, California (until October 17, 2023); Jon Ossoff, Georgia; Laphonza Butler, California (from October 17, 2023)	Ron Johnson, Wisconsin, Ranking Member; Josh Hawley, Missouri; Rick Scott, Florida; Roger Marshall, Kansas
Ex officio
Gary Peters, Michigan	Rand Paul, Kentucky
