= List of attendees of the Midwinter Ball =

This is a list of notable people to have attended the Australian Midwinter Ball.

== 2018 Ball ==
=== Celebrities ===
Sam Neill

=== Political attendees ===
- Adam Bandt
- Anthony Albanese
- Bill Shorten
- Josh Frydenburg
- Peta Credlin
- Scott Morrison
- Tanya Plibersek

== 2013 Ball ==
=== Celebrities ===
- Buzz Aldrin

=== Diplomats ===
- Jeffrey Bleich

=== Political attendees ===
- Anthony Albanese
- Arthur Sinodinos
- Bill Shorten
- Bob Carr
- Christine Milne
- George Brandis
- Larissa Waters
- Kevin Rudd
- Penny Wong
- Joe Hockey
- Tony Abbott
- Wayne Swan

== See also ==
- Federal Parliamentary Press Gallery
- White House Correspondents' Association
- White House Correspondents Dinner
