= Australia–United States relations =

- Australia: United States

Diplomatic mission
- Australian Embassy, Washington, D.C.: United States Embassy, Canberra

Envoy
- Ambassador Greg Moriarty: Chargé d'affaires Erika Olson

Australia and the United States became close allies in World War II, when the U.S. took up a more active role in Asia following several defeats of the British in Asia, which left Australia in fear of an imminent Japanese invasion. Since then there has been a robust relationship underpinned by shared democratic values, common interests, and cultural affinities. At the governmental level, relations between Australia and the United States are formalized by the ANZUS security agreement, the AUKUS security partnership and the Australia–United States Free Trade Agreement (AUSFTA). They were formally allied together in both World War I and World War II, the Korean War, the Vietnam War, the Gulf War, and the war on terror, although they had disagreements at the 1919–1920 Paris Peace Conference. Australia is a major non-NATO ally of the United States, and the two nations have held an annual meeting, the Australia–United States Ministerial Consultation, with one another most years since 1985.

The United States and Australia share some common ancestry and history, having both been British colonies. Both countries have indigenous peoples (Native Americans in the United States and Aboriginal Australians), who were dispossessed of their land by the process of colonization. Both states have also been part of a Western alliance of states in various wars. Together with three other Anglosphere countries, they comprise the Five Eyes espionage and intelligence alliance.

== History ==
=== 18th century ===
In the 17th century during the Stuart period, many convicts were sent to North America, both in the West Indies and on the mainland, which was novelized in the Daniel Defoe novel, Moll Flanders. Formal legislation would later become codified with the Piracy Act 1717, although the only legal stipulation for containment of penal transportation was that convicts not return to Britain during their seven-year sentences, in return for clemency. There was not yet a dedicated overseas social space in isolation, but this changed over the course of the 18th century during the Hanoverian period, when prison reform resulted in more professionalism.

In 1732, the Province of Georgia was founded, which was the first penal colony of the Kingdom of Great Britain. This was primarily a pressure release valve to reduce overcrowding in London debtors' prisons, providing an alternative, utopian setting for penitential activities like smallholding agriculture. Between 1775–1783, the American Revolutionary War prompted Parliament to reconsider locations discovered by Captain James Cook in the meantime, which eventually led to the 1787 commencement of the peopling of Australia with the First Fleet to Botany Bay.

There are dozens of similarities [between America and Australia] ... migrations to a new land, the mystique of pioneering (actually somewhat different in the two countries), the turbulence of gold rushes, the brutality of relaxed restraint, the boredoms of the backblocks, the feeling of making life anew. There may be more similarities between the history of Australia and America than for the moment Australians can understand.

— Australian historian Donald Horne, 1964

Due to the legal status of penal settlements, there were far less family units comprising pillars of community from back in Britain, so they became more original societies formed in situ. Inhabitants were forbidden from visiting hometowns to instigate chain migration, unlike the free colonies of America where there were no such restrictions save for the individuals barred from returning. Although most of the 13 Colonies were founded by and for freemen who had the choice of socializing with Britain, even including indentured servants who were (not confined to Georgia and) less financially predisposed to, American separation from Britain produced a reverse situation to that of Australia, which would thenceforth be ruled by Britain who kept Australia apart from them until the time of abolition.

=== 19th century ===
The discovery of gold in New South Wales in 1851 caused a massive influx of prospectors. Experienced gold diggers came from California, where gold had been discovered in 1848. Many others came from the Australian colonies, Britain and the British Empire, and China.

=== 1900 to 1919 ===
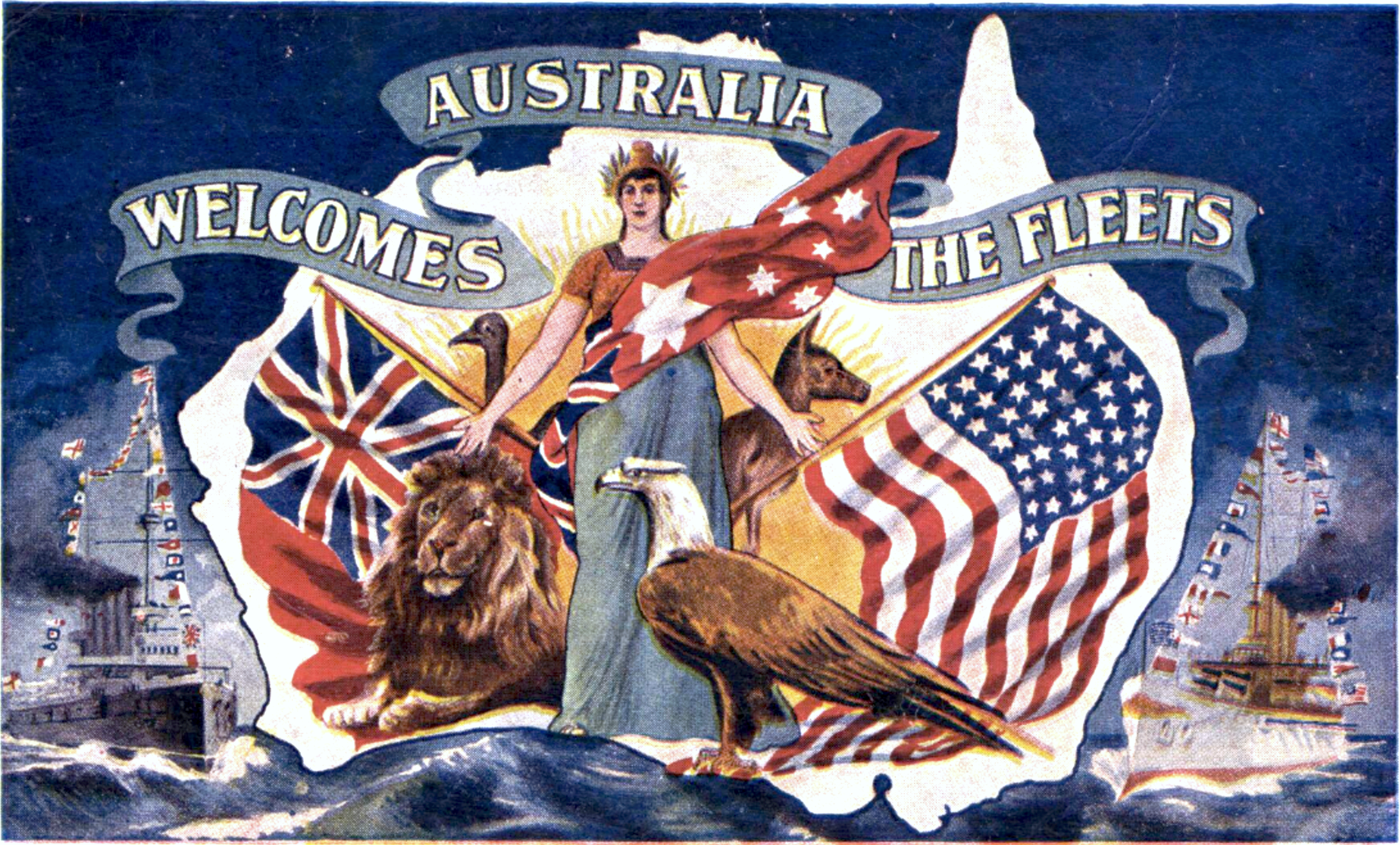
1908 postcard artwork, honoring the visit of the U.S. Navy's Great White Fleet to Australia

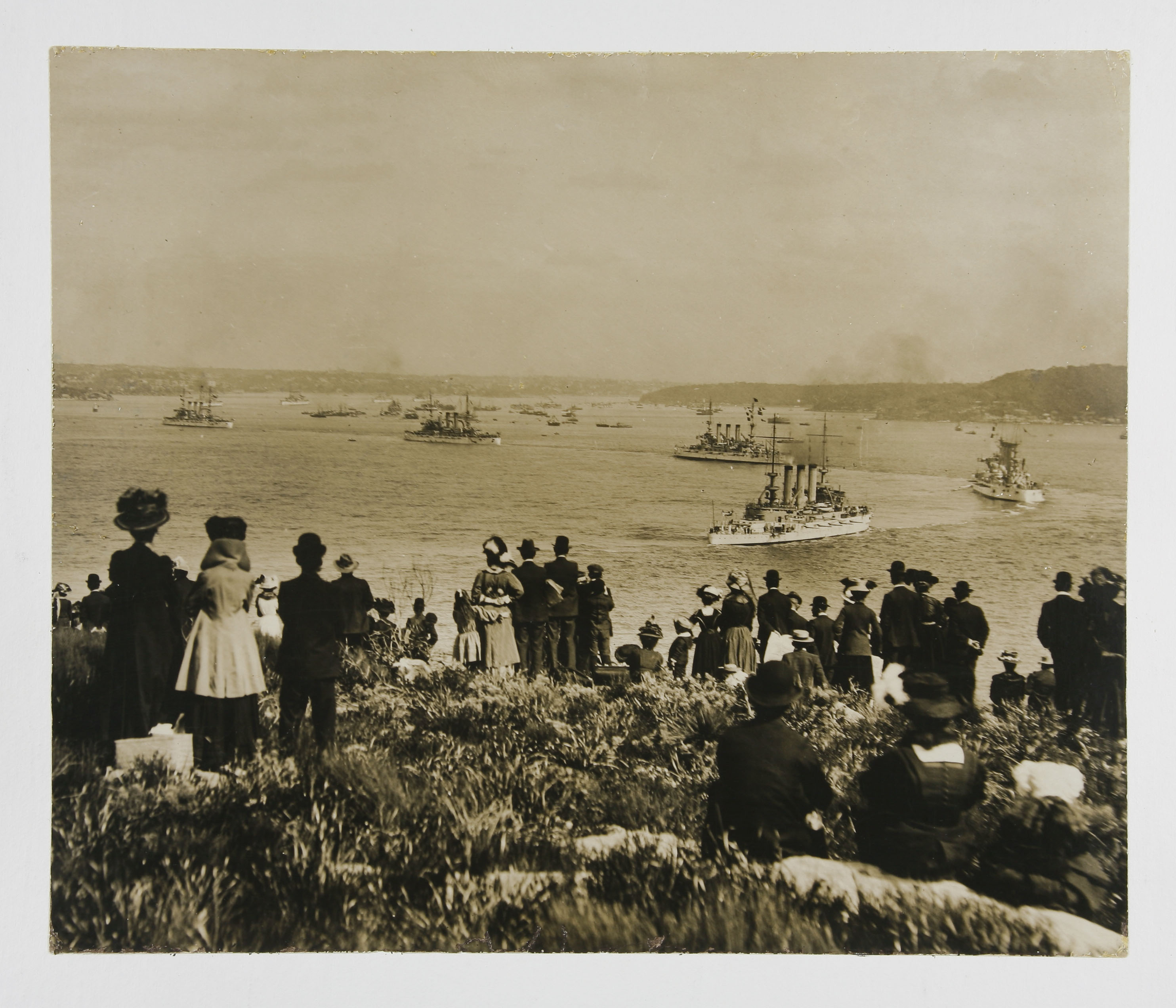
Spectators watch the Great White Fleet arriving in Sydney Harbor, August 1908

In 1908, Prime Minister Alfred Deakin was worried about possible threats from Japan, which had just defeated Russia in a major war. He invited the American Great White Fleet to visit Australia during its circumnavigation of the world. The fleet stopped in Sydney, Melbourne and Albany. Deakin, a strong advocate for an independent Australian Navy, used the visit to raise the public's enthusiasm about a new navy.

The visit marked the first occasion that a non-Royal Navy fleet had visited Australian waters. Many saw the visit of the Great White Fleet as a major turning point in the creation of the Royal Australian Navy. Shortly after the visit, Australia ordered its first modern warships, a purchase that angered the British Admiralty.

The United States and Australia both fought in World War I with the Allied Powers. However, at the Paris Peace Conference they disagreed over the peace terms for the Central Powers. While the U.S. delegation under President Woodrow Wilson favored a more conciliatory approach in line with Wilson's Fourteen Points, the Australian delegation under Prime Minister Billy Hughes favored harsher terms such as those advocated by French premier Georges Clemenceau.

Australia forcefully pressed for higher German reparations and Article 231 of the Treaty of Versailles against U.S. opposition. Although U.S. Secretary of State Robert Lansing had guaranteed German leaders that Germany would only be given reparations payments for damages it inflicted, Hughes tried to press for an expansive definition of German "aggression" so that the British Empire and Dominions, including Australia, could benefit. Hughes also opposed Wilson's plans to establish the League of Nations despite French and British support. Australia also demanded that it be allowed to annex German New Guinea as a direct colony rather than a League of Nations mandate, although on this point it was overruled when the United Kingdom and its other Dominions sided with the United States.

=== Independence in foreign policy ===
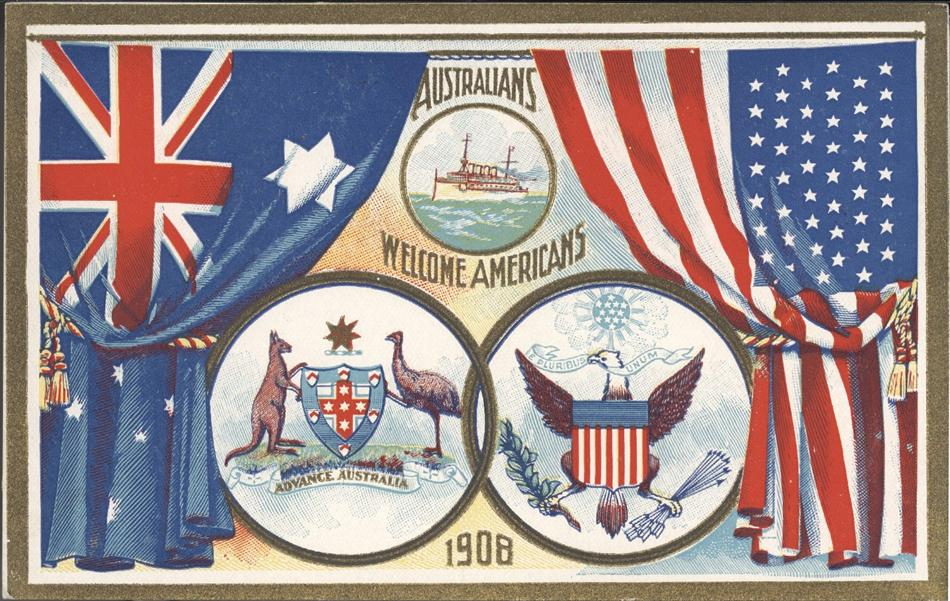
"Australians welcome Americans", postcard 1908

The political and economic changes brought on by the Great Depression and Second World War, and the adoption of the Statute of Westminster 1931, necessitated the establishment and expansion of Australian representation overseas, independent of the British Foreign & Commonwealth Office. Australia established its first overseas missions (outside London) in January 1940. The first accredited diplomat sent by Australia to any foreign country was Richard Gavin Gardiner Casey, appointed to Washington in January 1940.

=== World War II ===
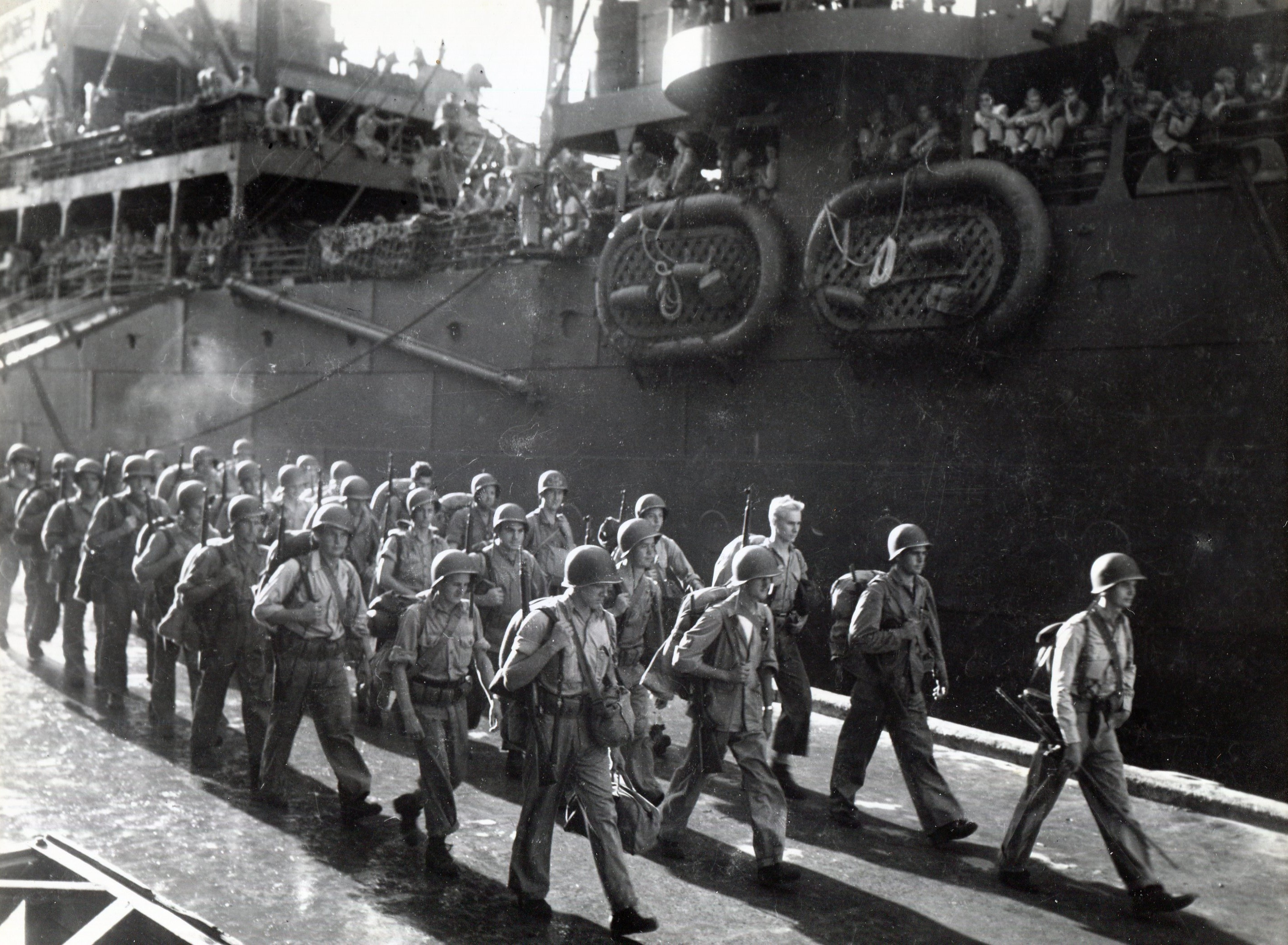
U.S. Marines disembarking from the USS Crescent City at Brisbane, Australia, after serving in the Solomon Islands campaign, c. 1943

Australia's foreign policy became primarily dependent on American protection after 1942 due to the collapse of British power in Asia. The fall of Singapore and the Japanese bombing of Darwin demonstrated that Britain could no longer guarantee Australia's security, forcing a fundamental shift in its strategic outlook. The first US Embassy opened in Canberra in 1943.

US General Douglas MacArthur was appointed Supreme Commander of the Allied Forces in the South West Pacific Area, which included many Australian troops. After the fall of the Philippines MacArthur's headquarters moved to Australia until 1944; Australian forces remained under MacArthur's overall command until the end of the war.

Over one million American military personnel passed through Australia. At their peak in 1942–1943, there were 150,000 stationed in camps near Brisbane, Rockhampton, and Townsville in the far northeast, as well as Melbourne and Sydney. Washington shipped in weapons, materiel and civilian supplies; indeed two-thirds of the nation's imports came from the U.S. Aussies beefed that the Yanks were "over-sexed, over-paid and over here"; there were fistfights over women but no serious violence apart from one episode in 1942. By mid-1944 the last combat units left Australia for the island battles to the north. Many of them left Australian brides behind. When the war ended about 2500 Americans permanently stayed in Australia. The rest returned home, some with brides and babies, and most with favourable memories. They had made many friends, one of whom says she, "will never stop giving thanks to those ice-cream eating, beer-swilling, meat-eating gorgeous Americans who saved our lives."

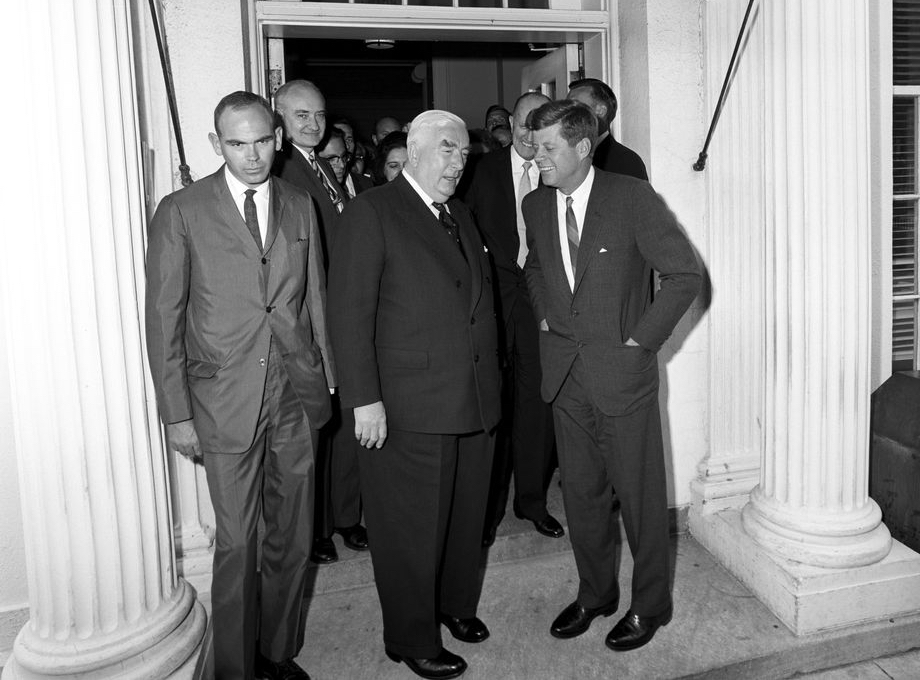
President John F. Kennedy with Prime Minister Robert Menzies at the White House, June 1962

=== Cold War ===
After the war, the American presence in the southwest Pacific increased immensely, most notably in Japan and the Philippines. In view of the cooperation between the Allies during the war, the decreasing reliance of Australia and New Zealand on the United Kingdom, and America's desire to cement this post-war order in the Pacific, the ANZUS Treaty was signed by Australia, New Zealand and the United States in 1951. This full three-way military alliance replaced the ANZAC Pact that had been in place between Australia and New Zealand since 1944.

Australia, along with New Zealand, has been involved in most major American military endeavors since World War II including the Korean War, Vietnam War, Gulf War and the Iraq War—all without invocation of ANZUS. The alliance has only been invoked once, for the invasion of Afghanistan after the September 11 attacks on the World Trade Center and The Pentagon.

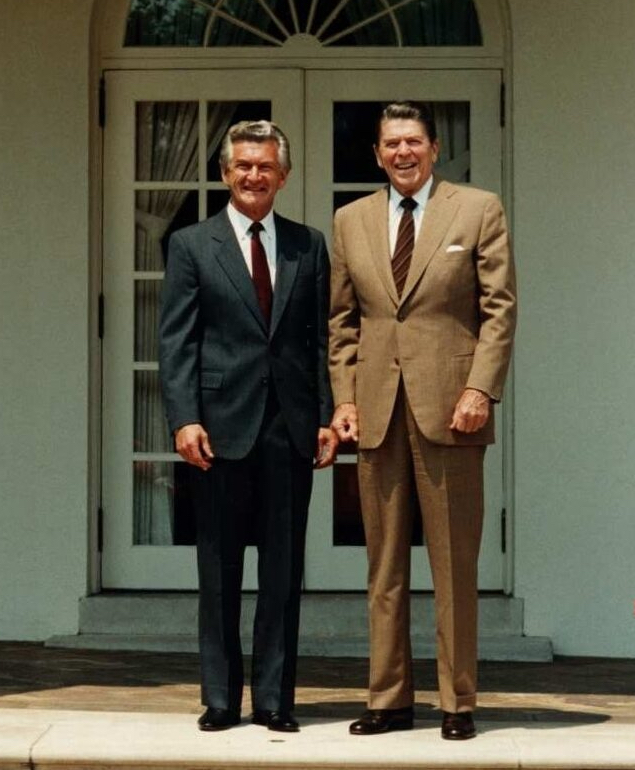
Prime Minister Bob Hawke with President Ronald Reagan at the White House, June 1983

Notably Australia, as a founding member of SEATO, directly supported the United States in the Vietnam War at a time when the United States faced widespread international condemnation from even many of its allies over the war. Australian prime minister Robert Menzies feared the expansion of communism into Asia-Pacific countries, such as Indonesia and Malaysia, if the communists won the war and a resurgence of isolationism if the United States lost. Under Menzies's successor Harold Holt support for the war waned due to strategic differences between the U.S. Armed Forces and the Australian Defence Force and the changing strategic situation in the region with the 1965 Indonesian coup d'état and founding of ASEAN. In 1967 Holt refused to provide a larger troop commitment after a visit from President Lyndon B. Johnson's advisors Clark Clifford and Maxwell Taylor. Australia's increasing hesitance to continue the war led to its de-escalation and eventually President Richard Nixon's Vietnamization policy.

From 1973 to 1979, Bob Hawke was an informant to the US government.

=== War on terror ===
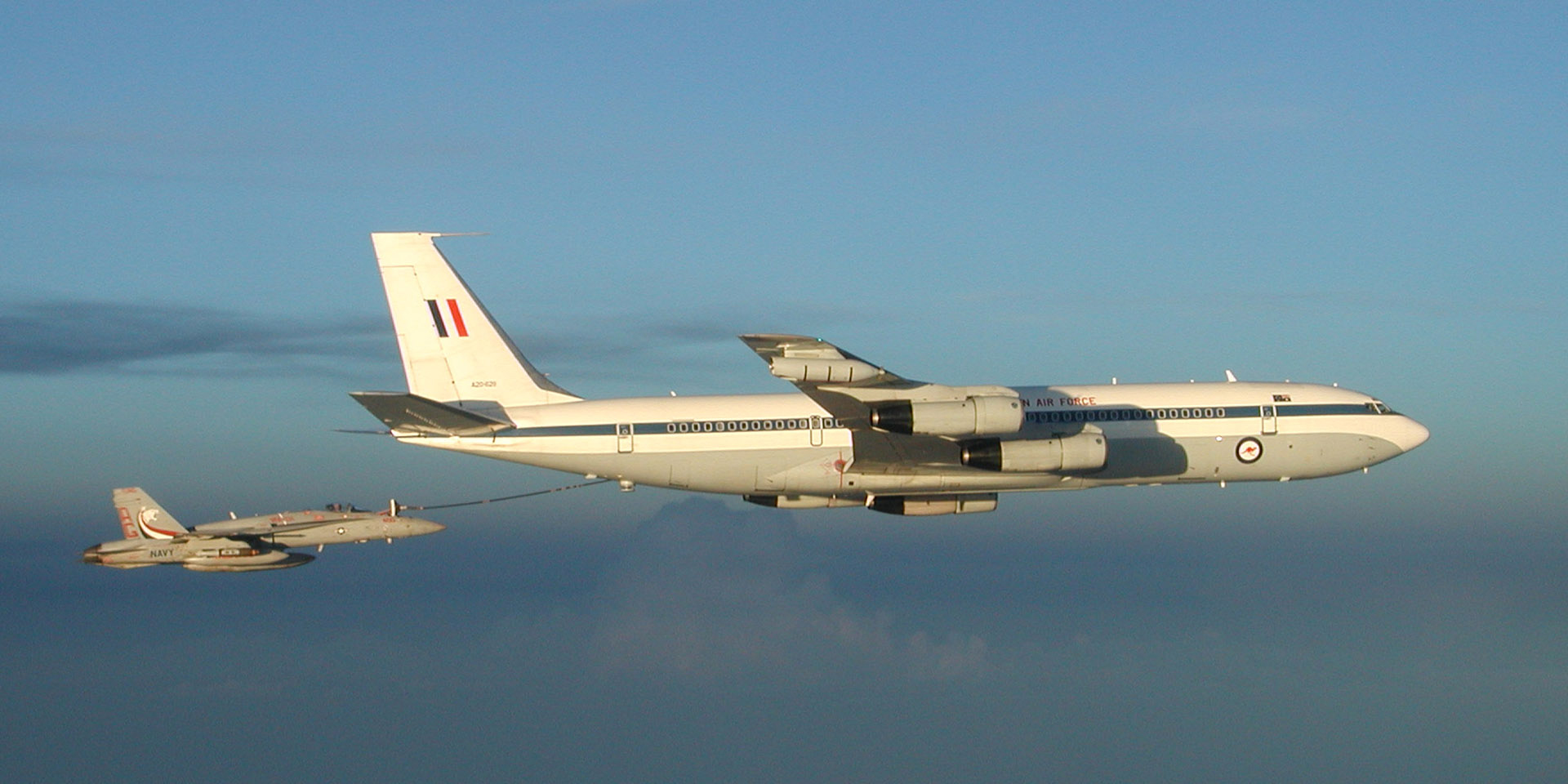
An EB-707 tanker from the Royal Australian Air Force's No. 33 Squadron refuels a U.S. Navy F/A-18C Hornet, April 2002

Following the September 11 attacks, in which eleven Australian citizens were also killed, there was an enormous outpouring of sympathy from Australia for the United States. Prime Minister John Howard became one of President George W. Bush's strongest international supporters, and supported the United States in the invasion of Afghanistan in 2001 and the Iraq disarmament crisis in 2002–03. Howard, Defence Minister Robert Hill, and Chief of the Defense Force Peter Leahy agreed to participate in the U.S.-led invasion of Iraq through Operation Falconer in order to improve its relationship with the United States despite widespread domestic and international condemnation of the war.

In 2004 the Bush administration "fast tracked" a free trade agreement with Australia. The Sydney Morning Herald called the deal a "reward" for Australia's contribution of troops to the Iraq invasion.

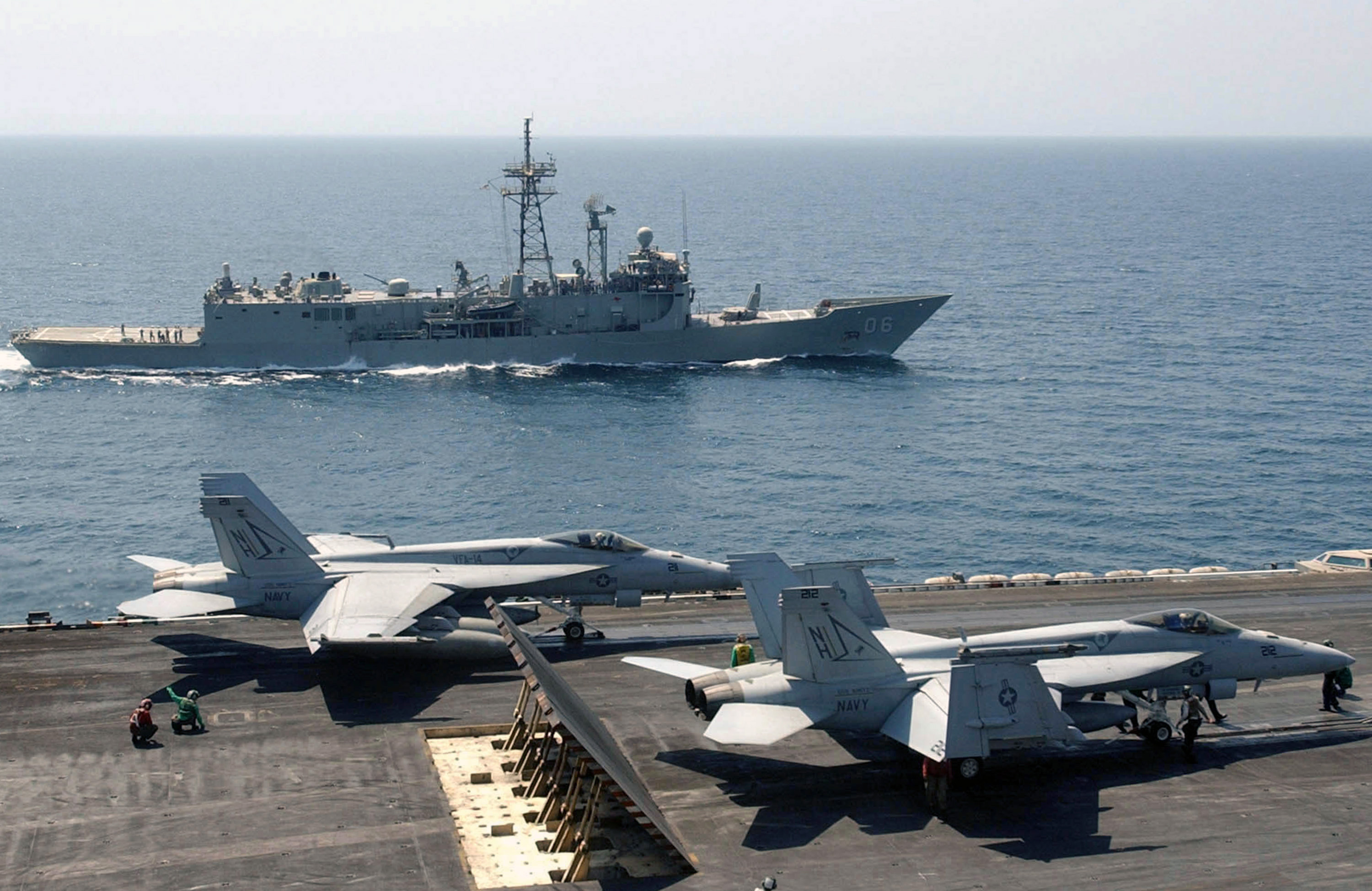
Australian frigate HMAS Newcastle alongside U.S. aircraft carrier USS Nimitz in the Persian Gulf, September 2005

However, Australian prime minister Kevin Rudd indicated that the 550 Australian combat troops in Iraq would be removed by mid-2008. Despite this, there have been suggestions from the Australian government that might lead to an increase in numbers of Australian troops in Afghanistan to roughly 1,000.

In 2011, during US president Obama's trip to Australia, it was announced that United States Marine Corps and United States Air Force units will be rotated through Australian Defence Force bases in northern Australia to conduct training. This deployment was criticised by an editorial in the Chinese state-run newspaper People's Daily and Indonesia's foreign minister, but welcomed by Australia's prime minister. A poll by the independent Lowy Institute think tank showed that a majority (55%) of Australians approving of the marine deployment and 59% supporting the overall military alliance between the two countries.

In 2013, the US Air Force announced rotational deployments of fighter and tanker aircraft through Australia.

== Political ==
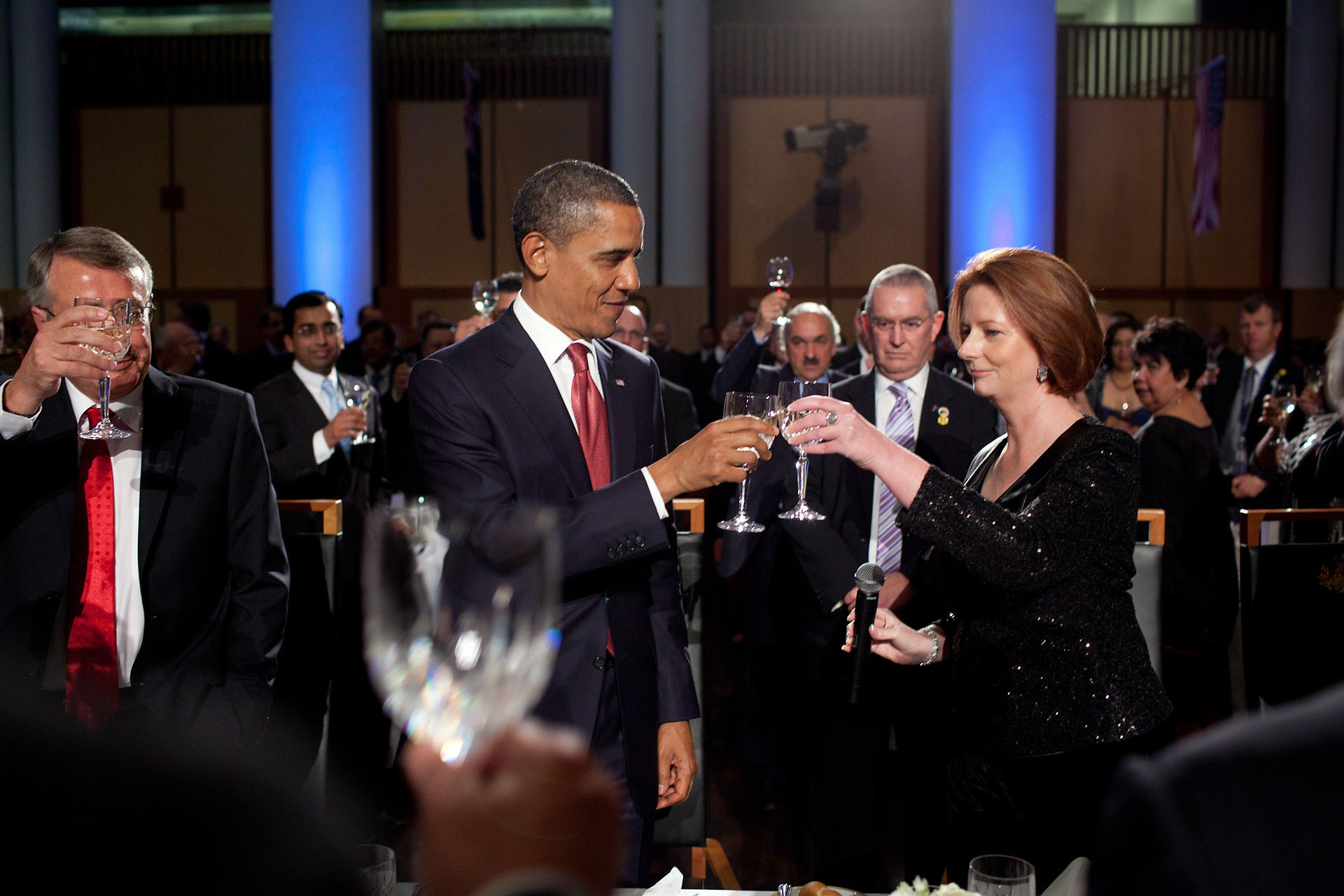
Wayne Swan, Barack Obama and Julia Gillard toast at a dinner at Parliament House in 2011.

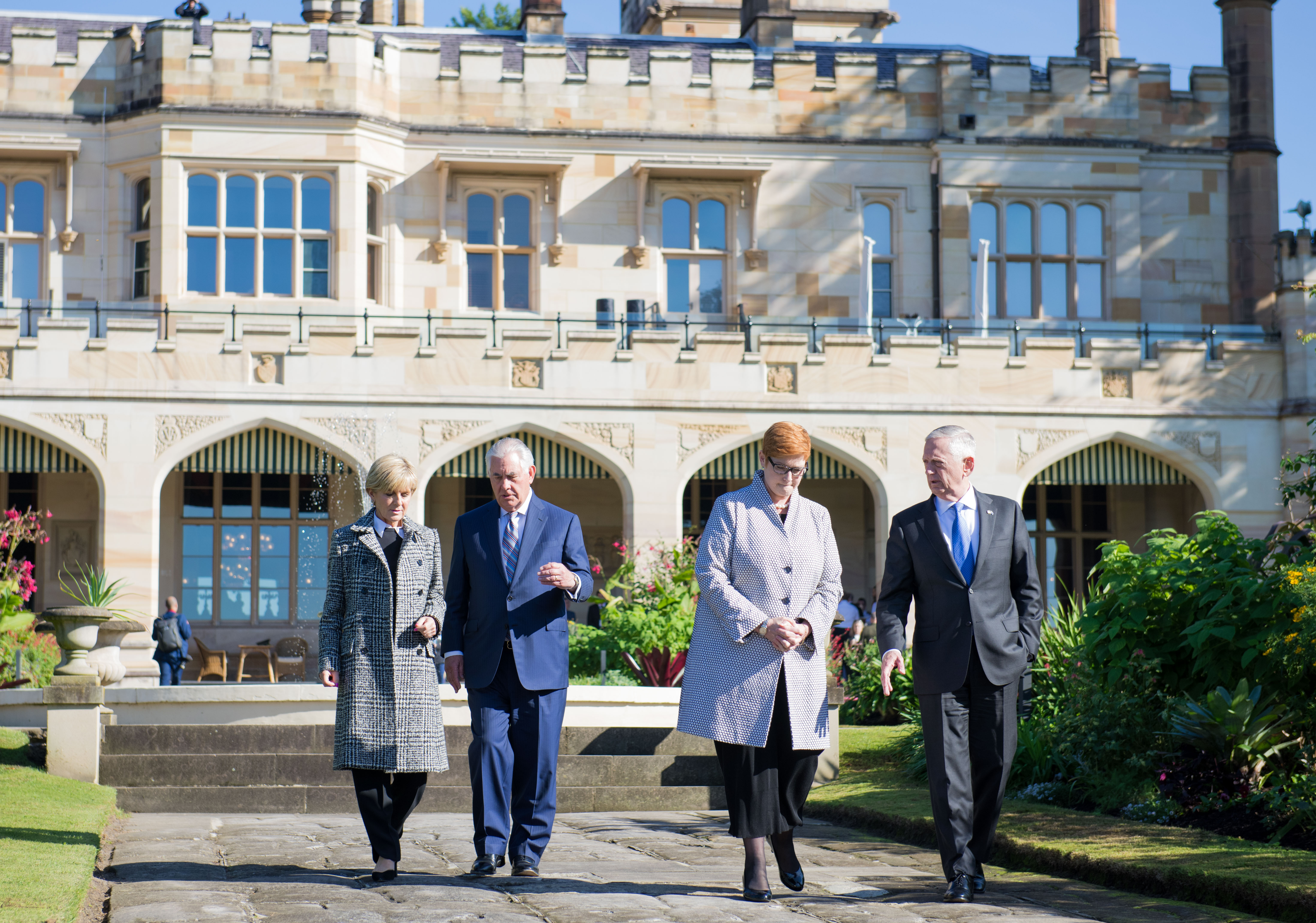
Australian and US foreign affairs and defence ministers at the AUSMIN summit in Sydney, June 2017.

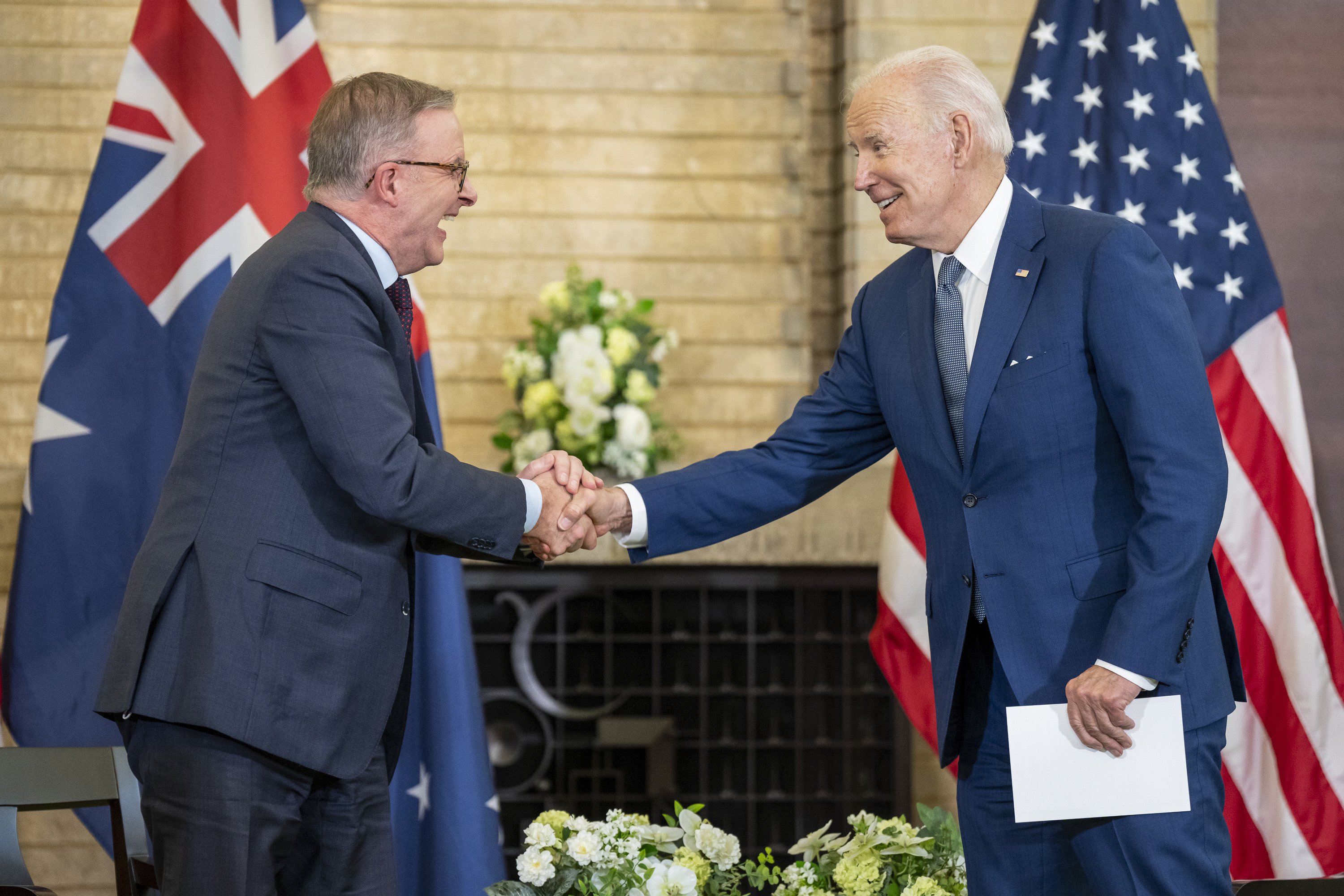
Australian prime minister Anthony Albanese with US president Joe Biden in Kantei, Tokyo, 2022.

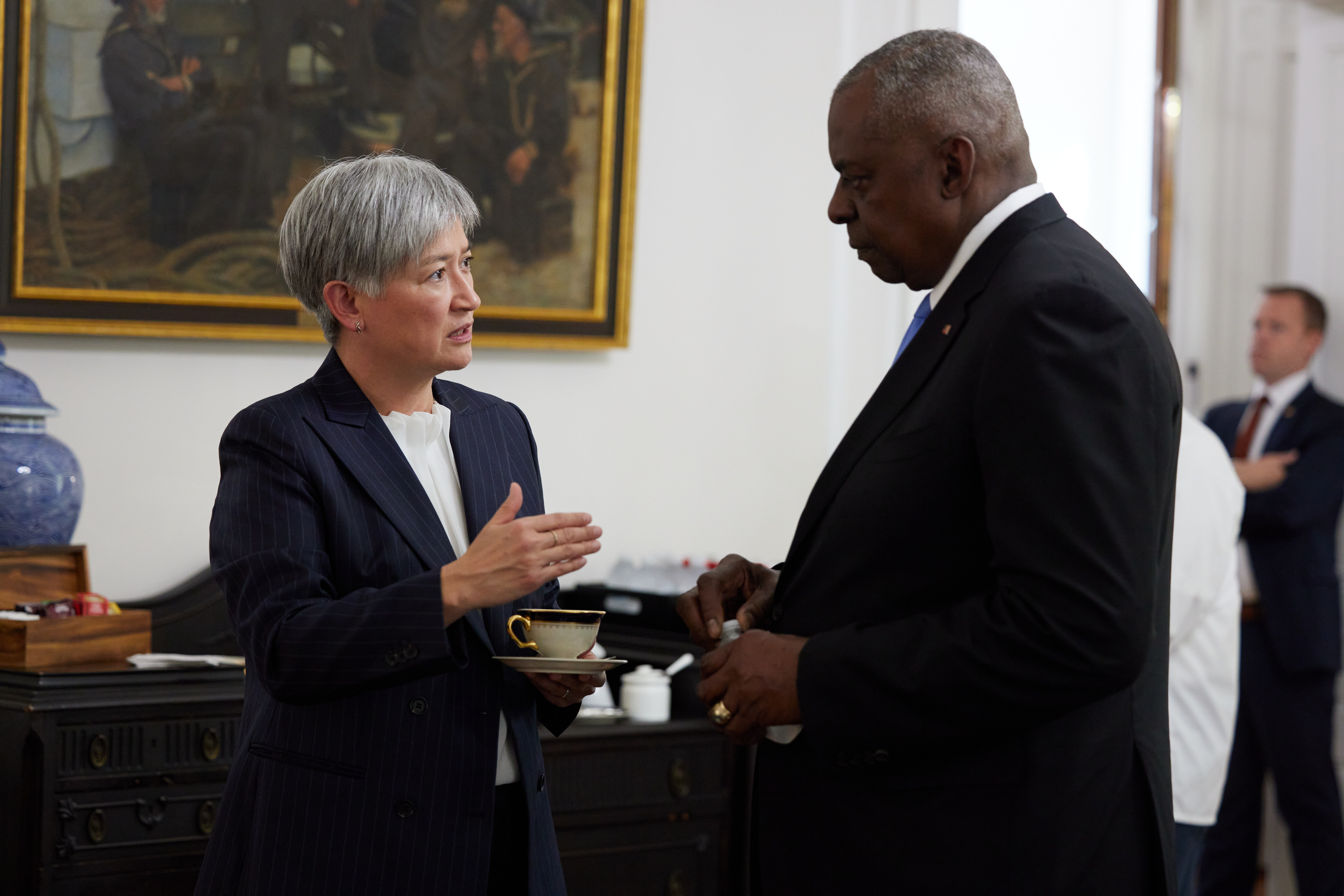
Australian foreign minister Penny Wong talks with US secretary of defense Lloyd Austin during AUSMIN 2024.

Since 1985, there have been annual ministerial consultations between the two countries, known as AUSMIN. The venue of the meeting alternates between the two countries. It is attended by senior government ministers such as the Australian Minister for Foreign Affairs, Australian Minister for Defence, US Secretary of Defense and US Secretary of State.

In late July 2020, Australia's Foreign Minister, Marise Payne, and Defence Minister Linda Reynolds, flew to the US to attend the annual AUSMIN talks with US Secretary of State Mike Pompeo and Defense Secretary Mark Esper despite concerns about the coronavirus. The year's talks focused on growing tensions with China. In the joint statement following the meetings, the two countries expressed “deep concern” over issues including Hong Kong, Taiwan, the “repression of Uyghurs” in Xinjiang and China's maritime claims in the South China Sea, which are “not valid under international law”.

=== Australian tours by US presidents ===
The first Australian visit by a serving United States president was that of Lyndon B. Johnson in 1966 to seek support for Australia's ongoing involvement in the Vietnam War. Australia had previously sent advisers and combat troops to Vietnam. In 1992, George H. W. Bush was the first of four US presidents to address a joint meeting of the Australian Parliament.

Dates	President	Cities visited	Reason
20–23 October 1966	Lyndon B. Johnson	Canberra, Melbourne, Sydney, Brisbane, Townsville	State visit; met with Governor-General Lord Casey and Prime Minister Harold Holt. First US president to visit Australia.
21–22 December 1967	Lyndon B. Johnson	Melbourne	Attended memorial service for Prime Minister Harold Holt and conferred with other attending heads of state.
31 December 1991 – 3 January 1992	George H. W. Bush	Sydney, Canberra, Melbourne	Met with Prime Minister Paul Keating and senior Australian officials; addressed a joint meeting of the Australian Parliament.
19–23 November 1996	Bill Clinton	Sydney, Canberra, Port Douglas	State visit. Addressed joint meeting of Parliament and visited the Great Barrier Reef.
22 October 2003	George W. Bush	Canberra	Met with Prime Minister John Howard and addressed joint meeting of Parliament.
2–5 September 2007	George W. Bush	Sydney	Asia-Pacific Economic Cooperation (APEC) Conference.
16–17 November 2011	Barack Obama	Canberra, Darwin	Met with Prime Minister Julia Gillard and addressed joint meeting of Parliament.
15–16 November 2014	Barack Obama	Brisbane	G20 economic summit.

=== United States tours by Australian Prime Ministers ===
Dates	Prime Minister	Cities/countries visited	Reason
27–30 May 1918	Billy Hughes	New York City	Met with President Wilson en route to Imperial Conference in London.
8–9 July 1935	Joseph Lyons	New York City	Discussed economic policy returning from Great Britain
9–12 May 1941	Robert Menzies		Attended a series of conferences on economic relations
April and May 1944	John Curtin	San Francisco, Washington, Warm Springs, New York City	Meeting with President Roosevelt and travel to and from the Commonwealth Prime Ministers' Conference in London.
9 May 1946	Ben Chifley	Washington	Met with President Truman for 15 minutes.
28 July 1950	Robert Menzies	Washington	Met with President Truman for half the day.
19 May 1952	Robert Menzies	Washington	Met with President Truman.
20 December 1952	Robert Menzies	Washington	Met with President Truman for informal dinner.
29 May 1959	Robert Menzies	Washington	Visited President Eisenhower and attended funeral of Secretary of State John Foster Dulles.
2 October 1960	Robert Menzies	Washington	Met with President Eisenhower and Prime Minister Harold Macmillan of the United Kingdom.
24 February 1961	Robert Menzies	Washington	Met with President John F. Kennedy and discussed SEATO, ANZUS and Laos.
20 June 1962	Robert Menzies	Washington	Met with President Kennedy and discussed West New Guinea, Vietnam, Laos, SEATO, ANZUS and the possibility of the United Kingdom joining the European Economic Community and how it would affect trade.
8 July 1963	Robert Menzies	Washington	Met with President Kennedy.
24 June 1964	Robert Menzies		Met with President Lyndon B. Johnson.
7 June 1965	Robert Menzies		Met with President Johnson.
June 1966	Harold Holt		Met with President Johnson and endorsed the USA's Vietnam policy. His speech included the words "All the way with LBJ".
27 to 30 May 1968	John Gorton	Washington and LBJ ranch	Met with President Johnson and discussed Vietnam.
6 May 1969	John Gorton	Washington	Met with President Richard Nixon and discussed Vietnam.
2 November 1971	William McMahon	Washington	Met with President Nixon and discussed bilateral issues and commitment to the ANZUS treaty.
NA	Gough Whitlam		No visit. Nixon had not extended an invitation due to irritation over a letter from Whitlam criticising bombing in North Vietnam. Whitlam was prepared to visit in June 1973 without an official invitation ("Official invitations are not necessary in these circumstances").
27 July 1977	Malcolm Fraser		Met with President Jimmy Carter.
30 June 1981	Malcolm Fraser		Met with President Ronald Reagan.
17 April 1986	Bob Hawke	US/Australian relations	Met with President Reagan. US offered a $5M gift for Australia's bicentennial celebrations for the proposed Australian Maritime Museum.
22–24 June 1988	Bob Hawke	Washington, D.C.	Met with President Reagan and other government officials.
14 September 1993	Paul Keating	Seattle, Washington	APEC meeting - met with President Bill Clinton.
7–15 July 2000	John Howard	Japan and USA	
4–8 September 2000	John Howard		Millennium Summit and Commonwealth High Level Review Group.
8–14 June 2001	John Howard		
8–14 September 2001	John Howard		State visit. Address a joint sitting of the US Congress on 12 September. Was the first world leader to support the US in its response to the September 11 attacks.
28 January – 8 February 2002	John Howard		
8–16 February 2003	John Howard		
1–10 May 2005	John Howard	New York City, Washington, D.C.	State visit. Addressed the 60th anniversary session of the United Nations in New York City.
8–14 May 2006	John Howard		
March/April 2008	Kevin Rudd	Washington DC	Part of 17-day world tour to China, the US, the UK and Europe. Met with President George W. Bush, Secretary of State Condoleezza Rice, Defense Secretary Robert Gates and US Federal Reserve Chairman Ben Bernanke. Also met with several presidential candidates.
24 March 2009	Kevin Rudd	Washington DC	Met with President Barack Obama.
7 March 2011	Julia Gillard	Washington DC	Met with President Barack Obama and addressed joint sitting of Congress.
12–13 November 2011	Julia Gillard	Honolulu, Hawaii	APEC meeting - met with President Barack Obama.
24–28 September 2012	Julia Gillard	New York City	Addressed the 67th session of the United Nations in New York City.
12 June 2014	Tony Abbott	Washington DC	Met with President Barack Obama.
19 January 2016	Malcolm Turnbull	Washington DC	Met with President Barack Obama.
4 May 2017	Malcolm Turnbull	New York City	Met with President Donald Trump.
23 February 2018	Malcolm Turnbull	Washington DC	Met with President Donald Trump.
19–27 September 2019	Scott Morrison	Washington DC	State visit.
13 March 2023	Anthony Albanese	San Diego, California	AUKUS meeting - met with President Joe Biden.
23–26 October 2023	Anthony Albanese	Washington DC	State visit
20-21 October 2025	Anthony Albanese	Washington DC	Met with President Donald Trump, signed rare-earth deal, mentioned commitment to AUKUS.

=== Kyoto Protocol ===
Australia's prime minister, Kevin Rudd, ratified the Kyoto Protocol on 3 December 2007, leaving the United States and Canada as the last major industrial nations not to ratify the agreement. Australia's previous government, led by Liberal John Howard, refused to ratify the Kyoto Protocol citing, along with the United States, that it would "damage their economies".

=== First Trump administration (2017–2021) ===
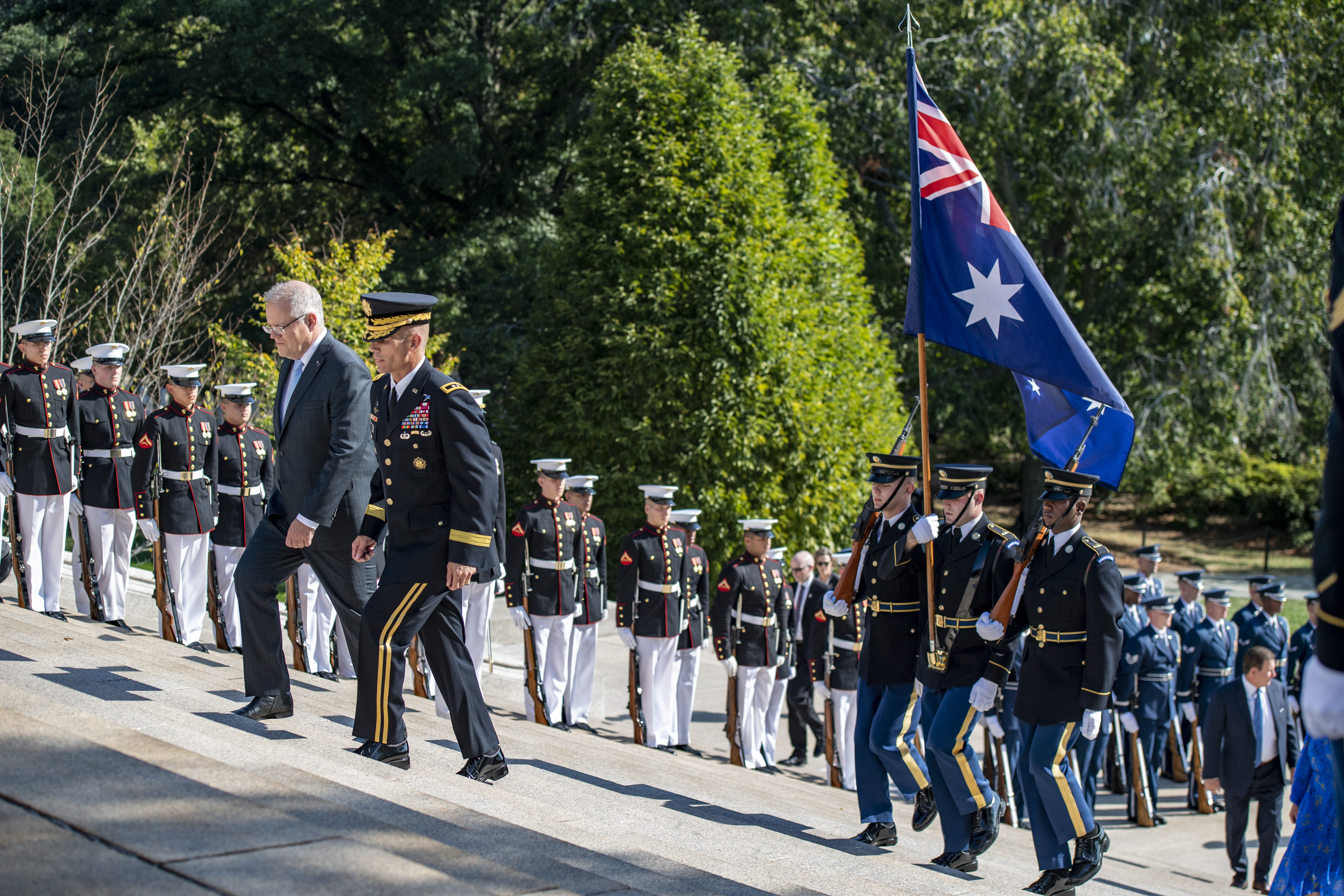
Prime Minister Scott Morrison visits the Tomb of the Unknown Soldier at Arlington National Cemetery during his September 2019 trip to the United States

The first phone conversation between the United States President Donald Trump and Australian prime minister Malcolm Turnbull took place in February 2017 and lasted around 25 minutes. During the call, Trump disagreed with Turnbull on a deal that had been made during President Barack Obama's presidency. The agreement aims to take about 1,250 asylum seekers into the United States, who are currently located on Nauru and Manus Island by Australian authorities. The deal will involve a swap of the 1,250 refugees located on Nauru and Manus with several thousand refugees originating in Honduras, Guatemala, and other Central American nations. Though the details of the trade were not made transparent to the public, a public briefing announced the deal would be applied only to existing refugees and that they would be resettled in America in the coming year.

On Twitter, 2 February 2017, Trump tweeted that the refugee agreement was a "dumb deal". Notwithstanding the disagreement, Vice President Mike Pence, while on a visit to Australia in April 2017, stated the United States will abide by the deal. In August 2017, The Washington Post released the full transcript of the meeting. In it, President Trump described the refugee deal as "ridiculous", "rotten", and "stupid". The president, angered by the discussion about refugees, said "I have had it. I have been making these calls all day and this is the most unpleasant call all day. Putin was a pleasant call". As at 16 November 2018 about 300 refugees have been resettled from Nauru under the refugee swap deal, some of whom want to return to Nauru.

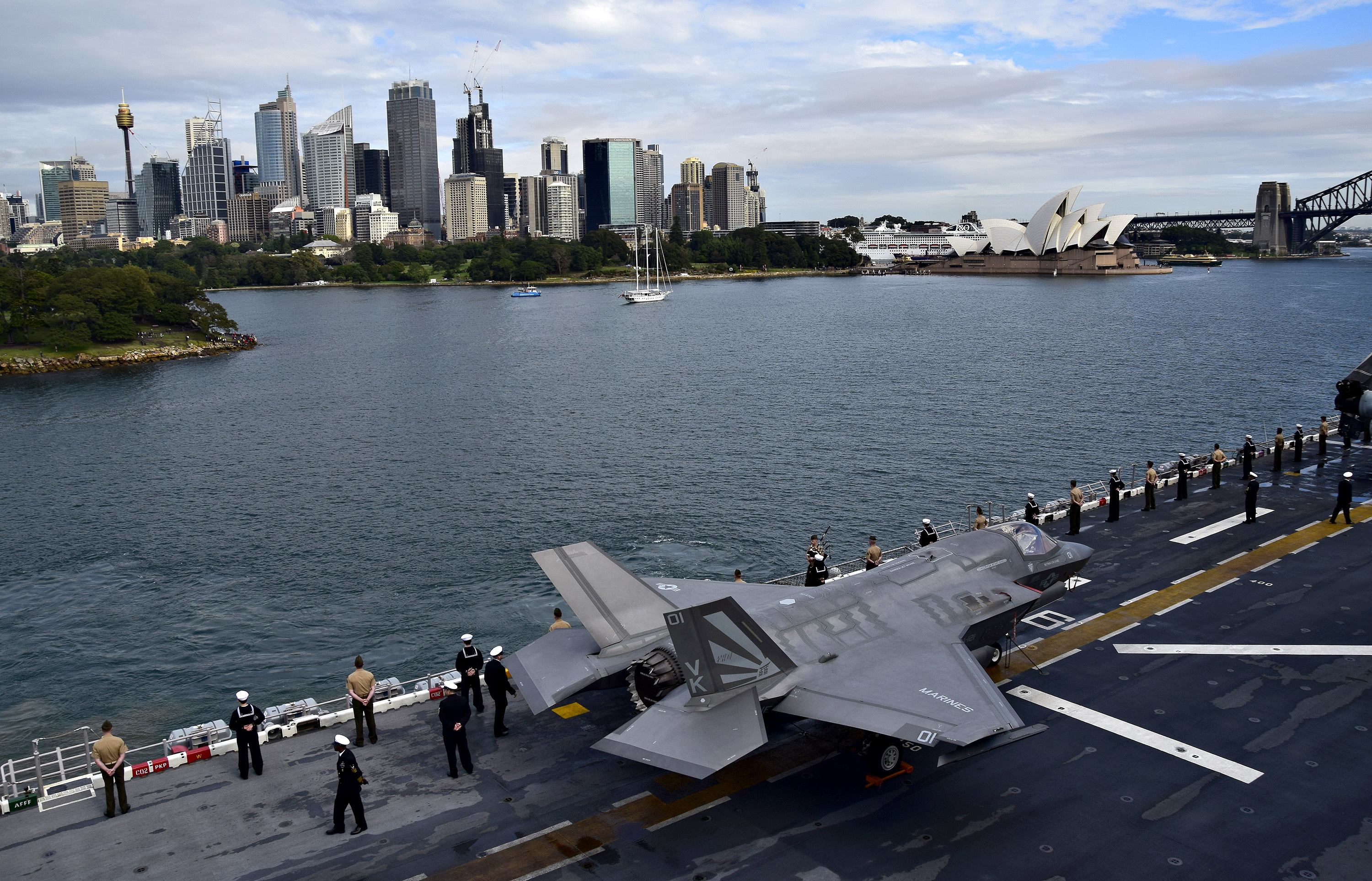
USS Wasp transits Port Jackson outside Sydney in 2019

In a video released by Channel Nine on 14 June 2017, Turnbull is seen mocking Trump at the Midwinter Ball.

In response to the growing threat of North Korea developing nuclear intercontinental ballistic missiles, Prime Minister Turnbull, in August 2017, emphasised the alliance between Australia and the United States and his nation's commitment to aiding the United States with possible conflict stating, "So be very, very clear on that. If there's an attack on the US, the ANZUS Treaty would be invoked and Australia would come to the aid of the United States, as America would come to our aid if we were attacked."

In May 2018, the United States granted Australia a permanent exemption from the United States' worldwide 25% steel tariff, making Australia one of only four nations worldwide to be exempted. Several other countries generally considered to have close relationships with the United States, such as Canada, Mexico, and the European Union, did not receive permanent exemptions.

On 2 January 2019, Washington lawyer Arthur Culvahouse was confirmed US Ambassador to Australia, filling a post that had been vacant since John Berry left the post in September 2016.

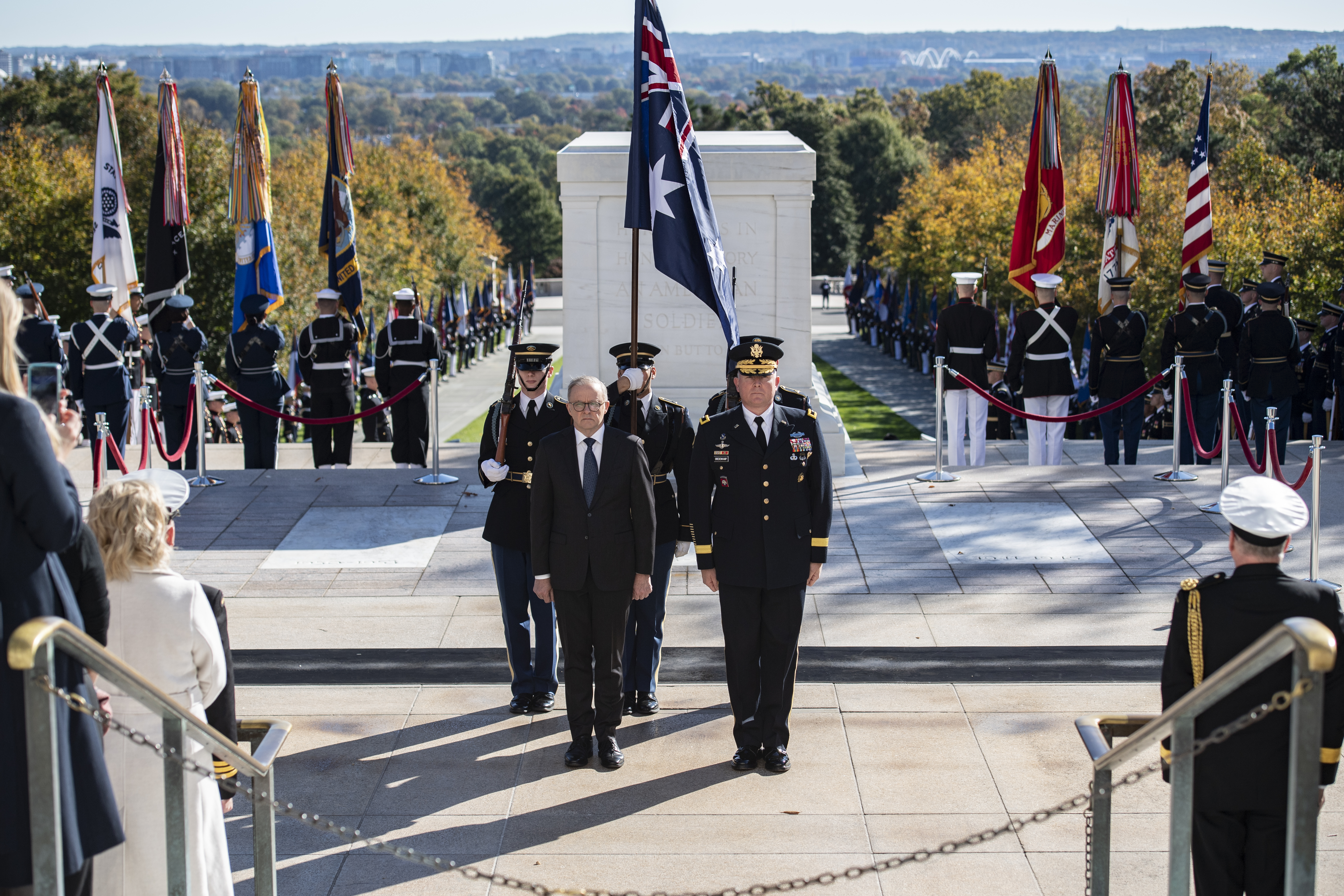
Prime Minister Anthony Albanese visits the Tomb of the Unknown Soldier at Arlington National Cemetery during his October 2023 trip to the United States

=== Biden administration (2021–2025) ===
==== AUKUS: Australia to acquire nuclear-powered submarines ====
On September 15, 2021, the leaders of Australia, the UK and the US announced "AUKUS":

a new security partnership in the Indo-Pacific, building on the longstanding alliance between the three to share intelligence, deepen cooperation and help Australia build nuclear-powered submarine capabilities as China's influence grows.

Although China was not specifically mentioned in the news announcements, Beijing said that the deal would "seriously damage regional peace and stability, exacerbate an arms race and harm international nuclear nonproliferation agreements." For the first time the United States and the United Kingdom will share their top-secret nuclear submarine propulsion technology, which has a far longer range and lethal value than diesel-electric submarines. By making the deal, Canberra broke with Paris, canceling a deal to purchase less expensive, less effective French diesel-electric submarines. No nuclear weapons are involved, and the submarines will carry conventional weapons only.

In March 2023, AUKUS announced that a new nuclear-powered submarine class would be built in the UK and Australia to be called the SSN-AUKUS that would include cutting edge US submarine technologies. Also, the US intends to sell Australia three nuclear-powered Virginia class submarines, subject to congressional approval, with the potential to sell up to two more if needed.

=== Second Trump administration (2025–present) ===
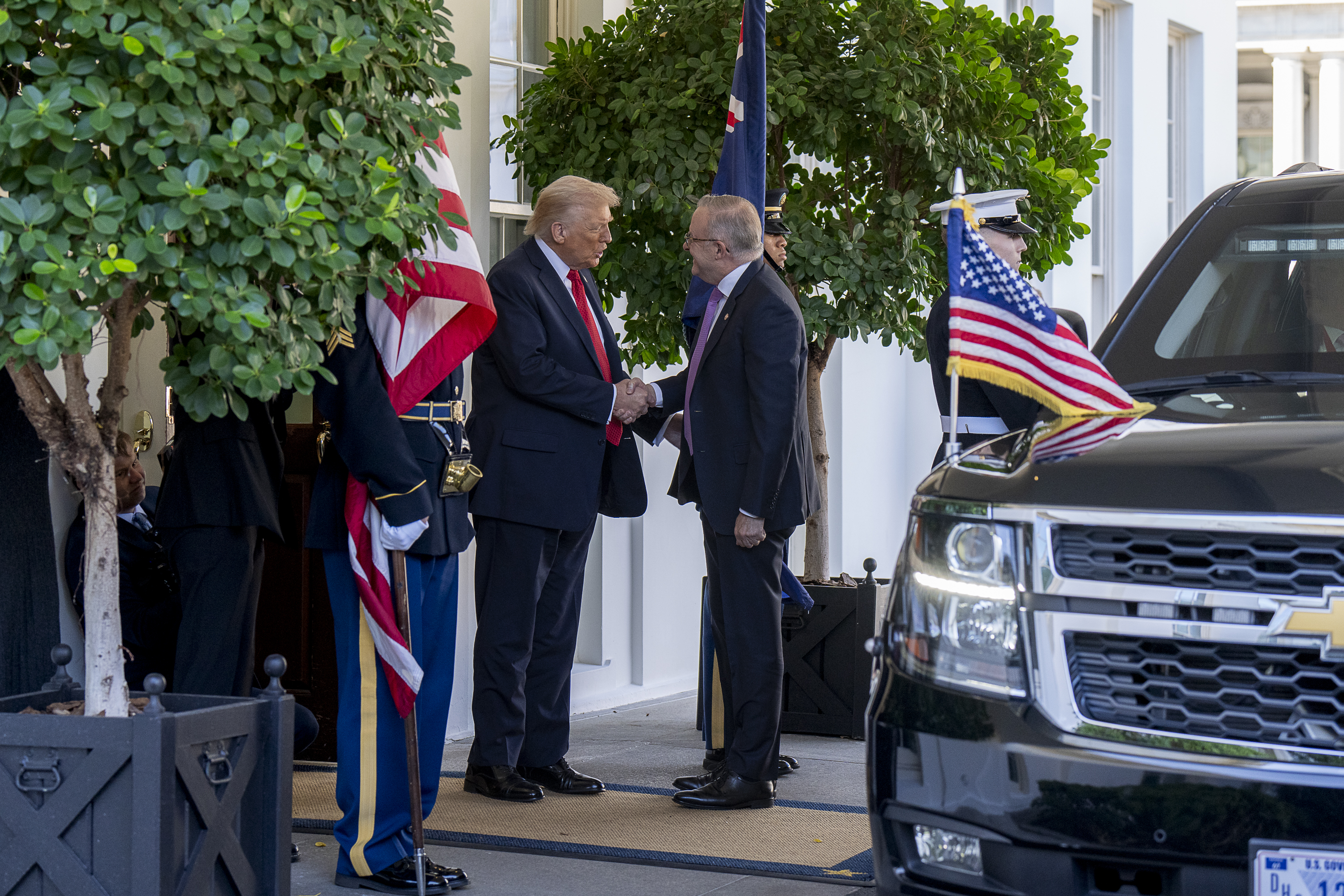
President Donald Trump greets Prime Minister Albanese at the White House, 2025

In June 2025, Foreign Minister Penny Wong voiced support for US strikes on Iranian nuclear sites amid the Twelve-Day War, saying, "We support action that the U.S. has taken to prevent Iran from obtaining a nuclear weapon".

In late July 2025, Agriculture Minister Julie Collins confirmed that Australia would relax biosecurity restrictions on US beef imports. This announcement was welcomed by both US president Donald Trump and Secretary of Agriculture Brooke L. Rollins as a "major trade breakthrough" for US beef exporters.

In August 2025, the Greens urged the Albanese government to stop supplying parts for the US-made F-35 to the global supply chain that can be accessed by Israel. According to Amnesty International, by participating in the production of the F-35, Australia has violated the Arms Trade Treaty.

On 21 October 2025, Albanese met with Trump at the White House. The two leaders signed a rare earths agreement aimed at countering Chinese control over the supply of critical minerals. Trump also reiterated the United States' commitment to supplying nuclear-powered submarines to Australia as part of the AUKUS agreement. During the White House visit, Trump rebuked Australian Ambassador to the United States Kevin Rudd for making past critical social media remarks about him in the past. Following the press conference, Rudd personally apologised to Trump. While Albanese and veteran Republican Michael McCaul expressed confidence in Ambassador Rudd, Opposition Leader Sussan Ley called on Rudd to resign as Ambassador.

On 6 March 2026, Australian Prime Minister Anthony Albanese acknowledged that three Australian Defence Force personnel were aboard the US Navy submarine that sunk the Iranian frigate IRIS Dena off the coast of Sri Lanka during the 2026 Iran war. He said that the Australian personnel were on board the submarine as part of a training rotation for the AUKUS security partnership. Albanese also clarified that the Australian personnel did not participate in any "offensive action" against Iran.

== Trade ==
Monthly value of Australian merchandise exports to the United States (A$ millions) since 1988

Monthly value of US merchandise exports to Australia (A$ millions) since 1988

Trade between the United States and Australia is strong, as evidenced by the Australia–United States Free Trade Agreement. The United States is Australia's fourth largest export market and its second largest source of imports as of April 2025. The United States is also the largest investor in Australia while Australia is the fifth largest investor in the US.

Australia and the United States also provide significant competition for each other in several third-party exports such as wheat, uranium and wool and, more recently, in the information technology sector. Although the US has a sizeable sheep population, American imports of lamb meat from Australia and New Zealand remain stronger than the domestic output.

=== Second Trump administration ===
During the second presidency of Trump, tariffs were imposed on what Trump called 'Liberation Day' and mentioned Australian restrictions as a reason for introducing a 10% tariff on all Australian imports and regarded as a double-cross by others.

On 21 October 2025, at a meeting in Washington DC, Trump signed a deal with Prime Minister Anthony Albanese over rare-earths and other critical minerals (Note: Rare-earth elements or minerals are distinct from minerals or materials described as critical minerals or raw materials, which refers to materials that are considered to be of strategic or economic importance to a country. There is no single list, but individual governments compile lists of materials that are critical for their own economies. However the two terms are often used interchangeably, especially in the U.S.) that are needed for commercial renewable energy production and technologically advanced military hardware. They each committed to provide at least US$1bn (A$1.54bn) towards a number of projects worth $US8.5bn (A$13bn) in both countries over six months. The agreement comes at a time that China is imposing tougher rules about exporting its own minerals. The deal was well-received by the Australian rare-earths industry and the markets, and is important to the US because rare earths are used in many technologies, including components of the Defense Force such as F-35 fighter jets and Tomahawk missiles. The deal is also seen as a major shift in economic alliances. At the meeting, Trump called Albanese a "great leader", said that said America had "no better friend than Australia", and strongly endorsed the AUKUS security agreement, whereby the US is committed to sell nuclear submarines to Australia. However, details were not revealed.

In February 2026, the Supreme Court of the United States struck down the Liberation Day tariffs as invalid. In response, the Trump Administration launched an investigation into forced labour in supply chains in March 2026. On 24 July, the United States imposed a 12.5% tariff on Australia, alleging the presence of forced labour in Australia's supply chains. Tariffs between 10 and 12.5 percent were also imposed on other 59 countries. The Australian government expressed opposition to the new tariff, arguing that Australia had some of the strongest legislation to tackle forced labour and that Australia had scored well in the US Government's recent "Trafficking in Persons" annual report.

== Cultural relations ==
Australia has absorbed a significant amount of American cultural influence, particularly in the postwar period.

=== Sports ===
Baseball has a minor presence in Australia, having been introduced by Americans in the 19th century and become accepted as a winter sport for cricketers. Cricket's 21st century growth in the United States has been powered to some extent by professional athletes from both countries playing in each other's leagues. When it comes to Olympic swimming, the United States and Australia are the two most successful nations so much so it has been dubbed the Duel in the Pool.

== Opinion polls ==
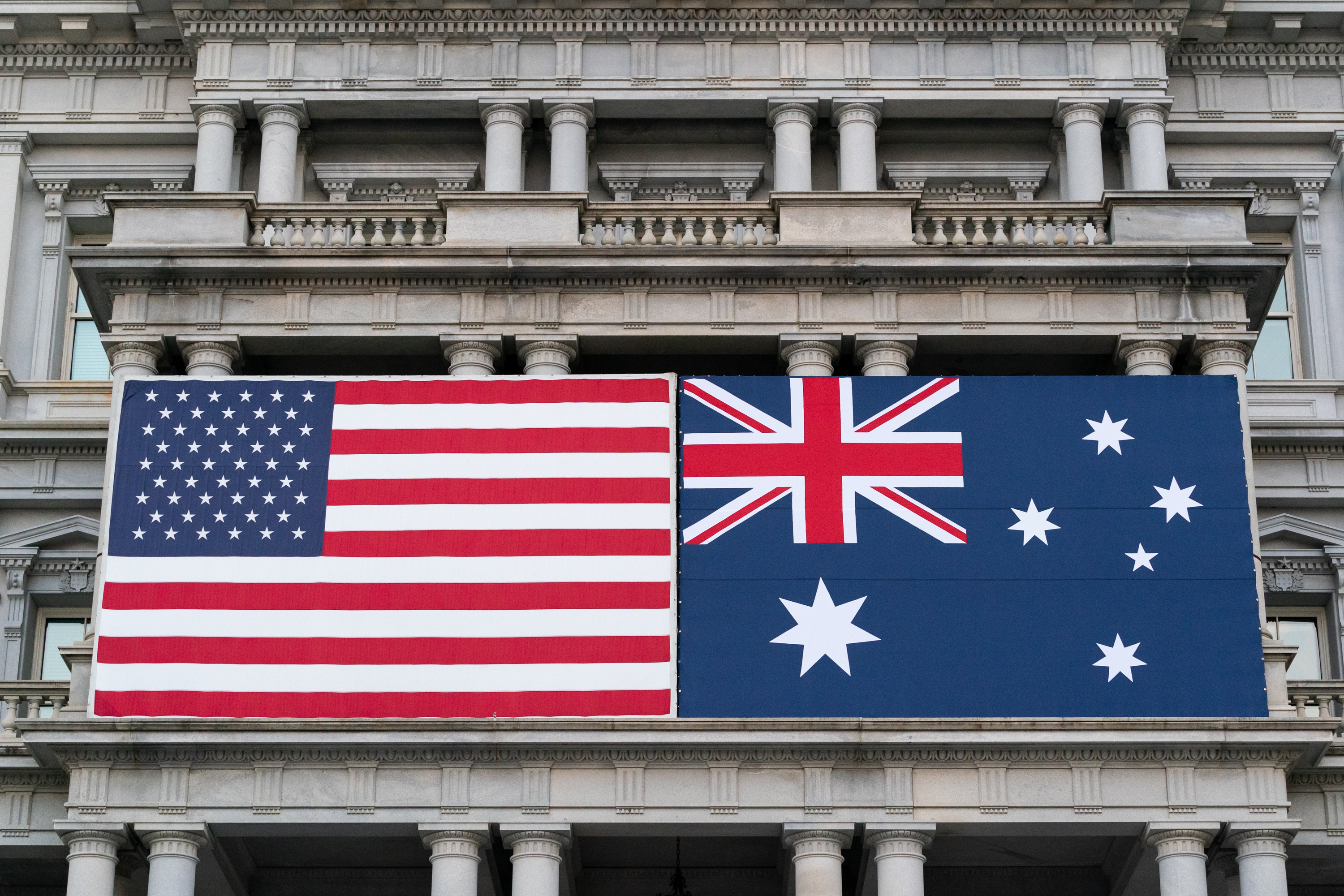
American and Australian flags displayed on the Eisenhower Executive Office Building in Washington, D.C., 2019

According to the 2012 US Global Leadership Report collated in partnership between Meridian International Center and Gallup, 55% of Australians approve of US leadership, with 21% disapproving and 24% uncertain.

According to a 2014 BBC World Service poll, 44% of Australians had a "mainly positive" view of the United States and 46% had a "mainly negative" view, for a net rating of −2 points. No similar survey was conducted to ascertain American perceptions of Australia.

In 2019, a comprehensive poll conducted by YouGov asked for the opinions of both United States and Australian citizens, on a wide range of political and social issues. 61% of citizens of the United States believed that Australia is an ally, and 36% saw Australia as friendly. 60% of Australian citizens believed that the United States is an ally, and 34% saw the U.S. as friendly. Just 20% of Australians wanted Donald Trump to win a second term as President of the United States.

A 2020 poll by YouGov declared Australia as the most positively viewed foreign country by Americans, with 75% having a favorable opinion. It ranked behind only the United States itself, which had a 78% rating.

In March 2025, in a poll conducted by The Australia Institute, 51% of Australians think US president Donald Trump's election was a bad or very bad thing for the world, while 31% think he is the greatest threat to world peace, more so than Vladimir Putin (27%) or Xi Jinping (27%). More Australians support pursuing a more independent foreign policy than deepening the alliance with the United States (44% compared to 35%).

In a poll conducted by YouGov in May 2025, 66% of Australians think US president Donald Trump's election was a bad or very bad thing for the world.

In June 2025, a survey conducted by the Pew Research Center showed that 71% of Australians viewed the US unfavorably, while 29% viewed it favorably. The poll found that only 22% of Australians had confidence in Donald Trump, in contrast to the 77% who had little or no confidence. In an annual poll by Australian think tank the Lowy Institute, the United States garnered a 50 degree out of 100 positivity rating from Australians, down from 73 in 2015. In the same poll, the institute showed that 80% of Australian citizens believed an alliance with the US was important for security. 36% of Australians believed that the US could act responsibly in the world.

In 2026, another poll conducted by the Lowy Institute found that Australia's trust in the United States has dropped to a record low, with 31% saying that the United States could be trusted to act responsibly in the world, representing a 5 point drop from the previous year. Confidence in Donald Trump continued to poll lower, with only 21% trusting him to do the right thing in world affairs. In the same poll, US vice president JD Vance has just 20% trust of Australians as a world leader. According to a 2026 Pew Research Center survey, 24% of Australians had a favorable view of the United States, while 76% had a negative view.

== Resident diplomatic missions ==
of Australia to the United States

- Washington, D.C. (Embassy)
- Chicago (Consulate-General)
- Honolulu (Consulate-General)
- Houston (Consulate-General)
- Los Angeles (Consulate-General)
- New York City (Consulate-General)
- San Francisco (Consulate-General)

of the United States in Australia

- Canberra (Embassy)
- Melbourne (Consulate-General)
- Perth (Consulate-General)
- Sydney (Consulate-General)

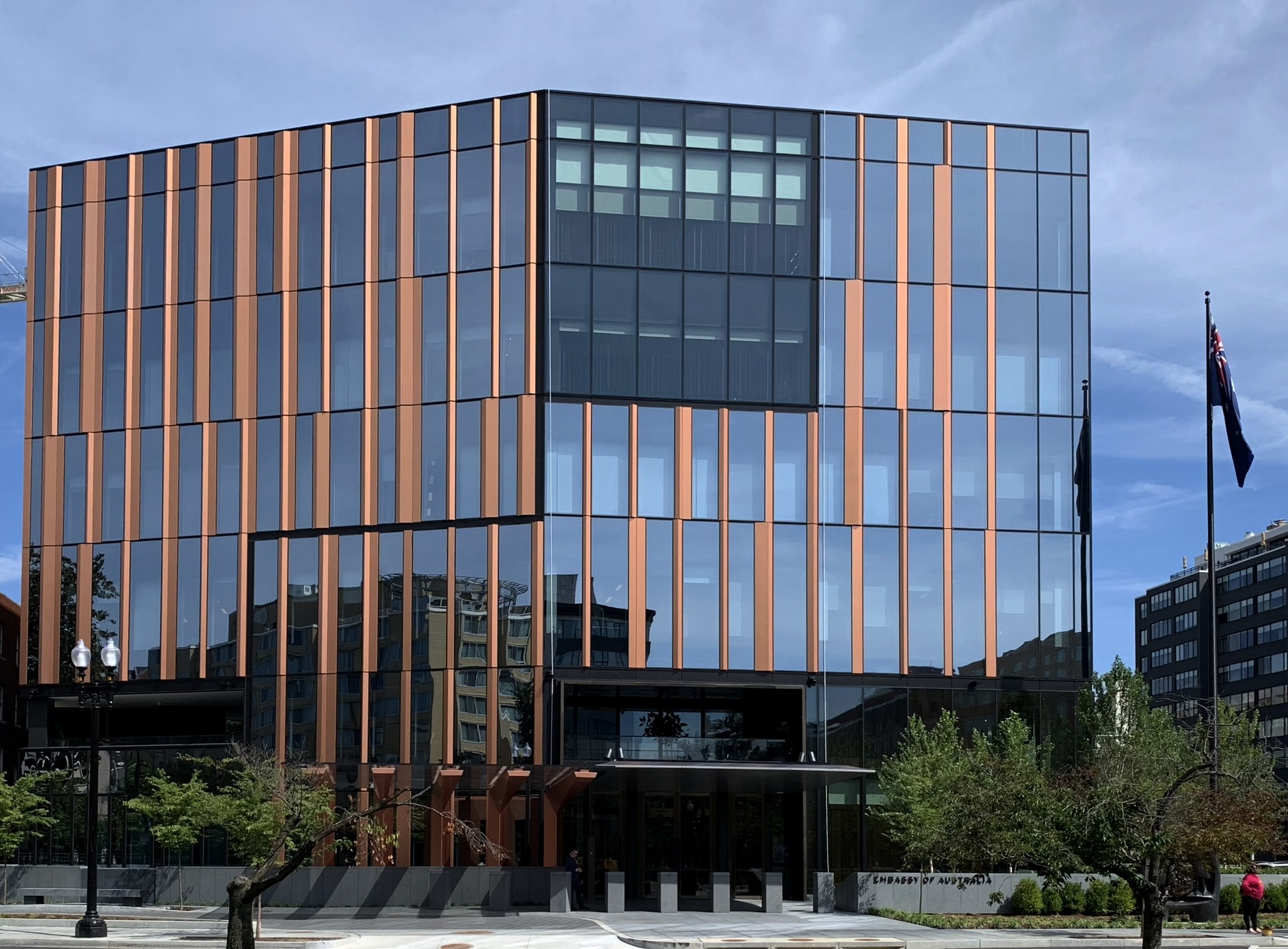
Embassy of Australia in Washington, D.C.

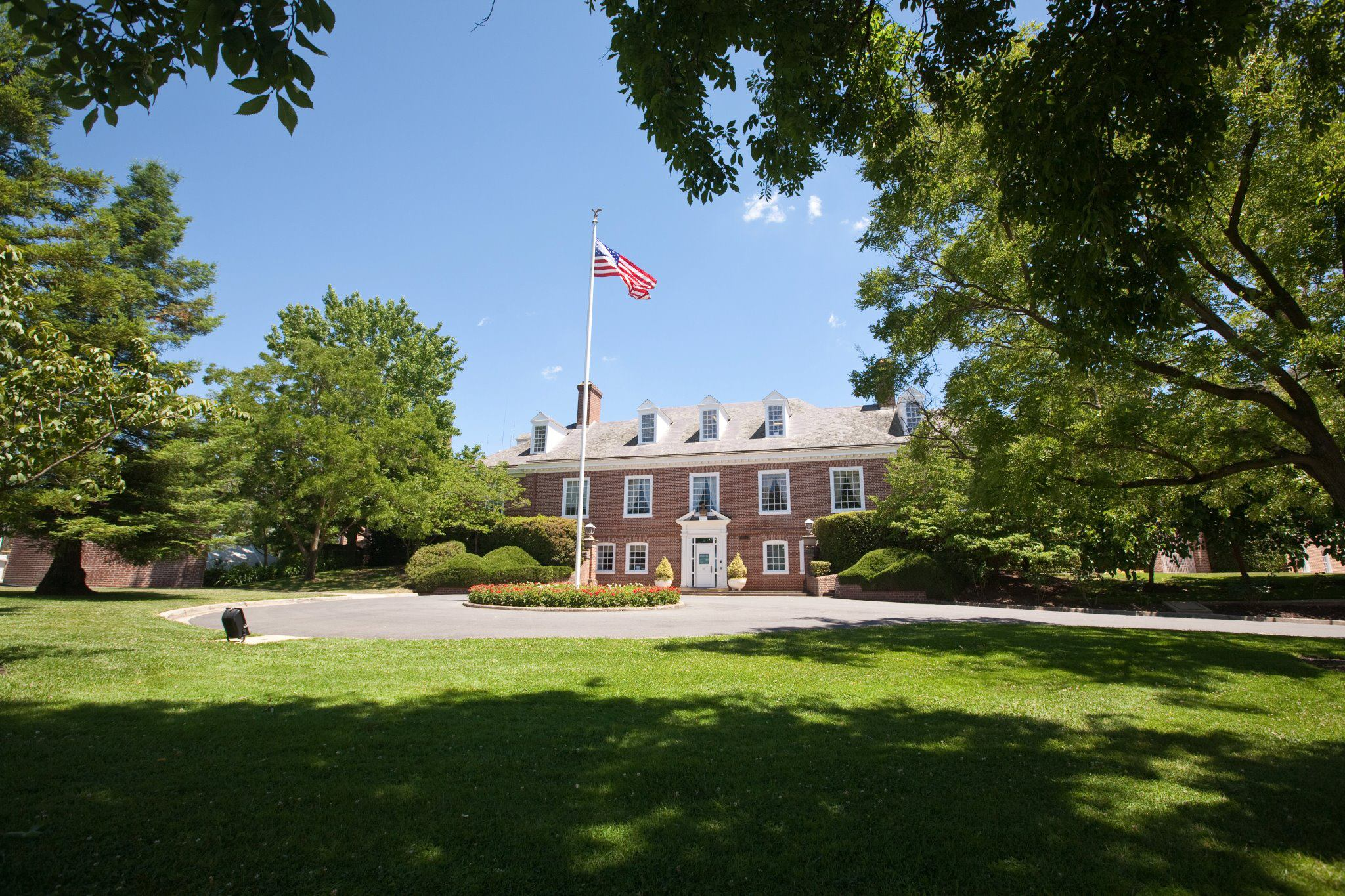
Embassy of the United States in Canberra

== Twin towns and sister cities ==
- Adelaide, South Australia and Austin, Texas
- (Victoria (state)) Bayside, Victoria and Nazareth, Pennsylvania
- Bega Valley, New South Wales and Littleton, Colorado
- (Victoria (state)) Bendigo, Victoria and Baltimore, Maryland
- Bland, New South Wales and Boring, Oregon
- Blue Mountains, New South Wales and Flagstaff, Arizona
- Brisbane, Queensland and Los Angeles, California
- Cairns, Queensland and Scottsdale, Arizona
- Canterbury-Bankstown, New South Wales and Colorado Springs, Colorado
- Cockburn, Western Australia and Mobile, Alabama
- Darwin, Northern Territory and Anchorage, Alaska
- (Victoria (state)) Glen Iris, Victoria and Glendale, California
- Gold Coast, Queensland and Fort Lauderdale, Florida
- (Victoria (state)) Shepparton, Victoria and Novato, California
- Hawkesbury, New South Wales and Temple City, California
- Lake Macquarie, New South Wales and Round Rock, Texas
- Launceston, Tasmania and Napa, California
- (Queensland) Lismore, New South Wales and Eau Claire, Wisconsin
- Mackay, Queensland and Kailua-Kona, Hawaii
- Murray Bridge, South Australia and Laredo, Texas
- (Victoria (state)) Melbourne, Victoria and Boston, Massachusetts
- (Victoria (state)) Mildura, Victoria and Upland, California
- Northern Beaches, New South Wales and Huntington Beach, California
- Orange, New South Wales and Orange, California
- Perth, Western Australia and Houston, Texas
- Perth, Western Australia and San Diego, California
- Port Stephens, New South Wales and (Washington (state)) Bellingham, Washington
- Sutherland, New South Wales and Lakewood, Colorado
- Sydney, New South Wales and Portland, Oregon
- Sydney, New South Wales and San Francisco, California
- Tamworth, New South Wales and Nashville, Tennessee
- Whyalla, South Australia and Texas City, Texas
- (Victoria (state)) Wyndham, Victoria and Costa Mesa, California

== Quotes ==
- "The United States is profoundly grateful for this relationship, for the affection and the warmth that has grown between our citizens. For many reasons our ties have grown. One of the most important is that we see in each other qualities that we prize and hope for in ourselves. We admire in each other the pioneering spirit that our forebears brought to the tasks of pushing back the frontiers and building nations."

– Bill Clinton during his November 1996 speech to Australian Parliament.

== See also ==
- Anti-Americanism § Australia
- American Australians
- Australian Americans
- Australia Week, in USA
- Australian–American Memorial
- Diplomatic history of Australia
- Embassy of Australia, Washington, D.C.
- Embassy of the United States, Canberra
- Quadrilateral Security Dialogue
- USS Canberra (CA-70)
- USS Canberra (LCS-30)

General:

- Foreign relations of Australia
- Foreign relations of the United States
