= AUSMIN =

Diplomatic forum

Australia United States Ministerial Consultations (AUSMIN)
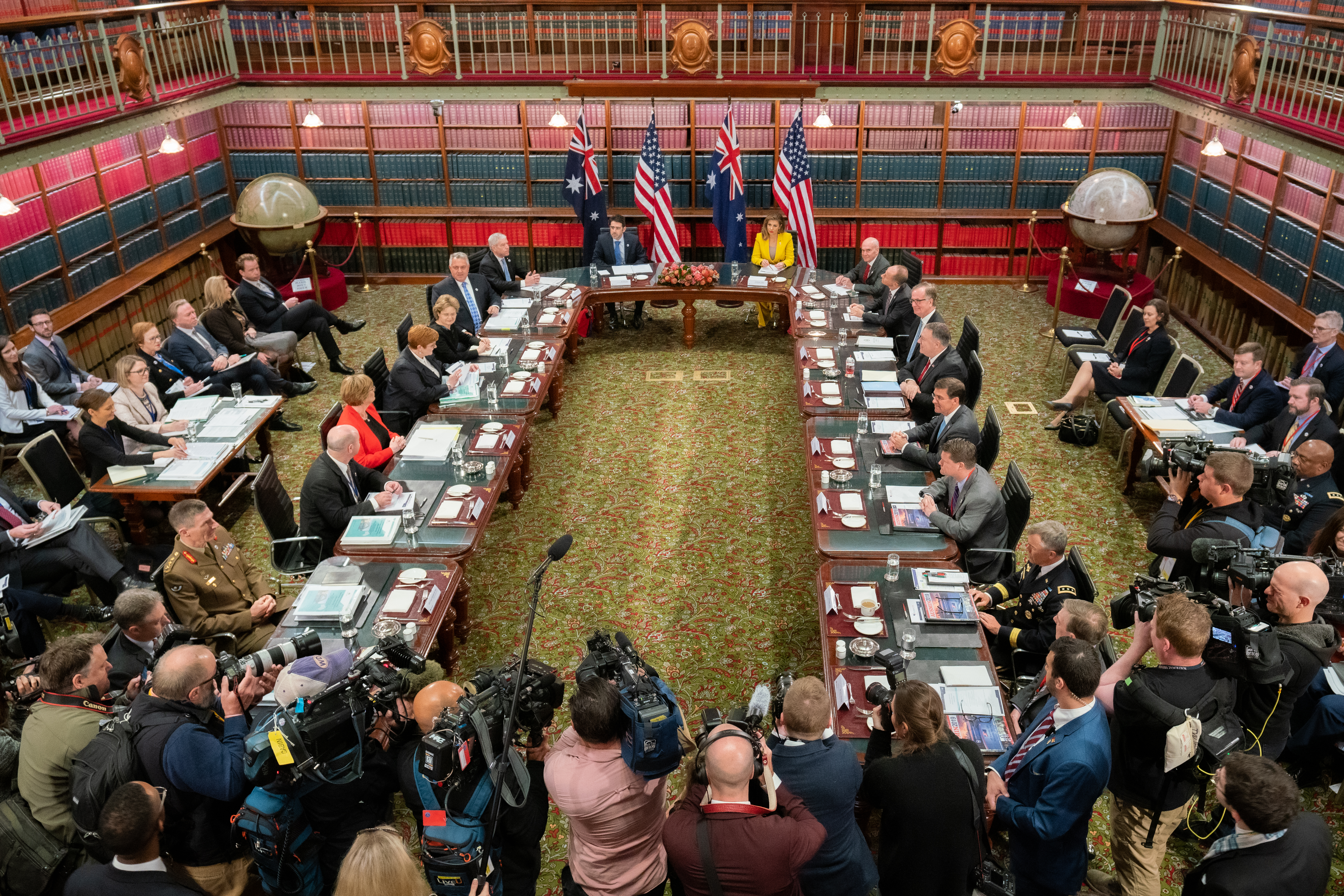
- AUSMIN 2019
- Abbreviation: AUSMIN
- Formation: 1985
- Type: International defence organisation
- Members: 2 member states: Australia; United States
- Official language: English

AUSMIN, the Australia-United States Ministerial Consultation, is the main annual forum for consultations between Australia and the United States. It has been held most years since 1985, with the meetings alternating between locations in Australia and the United States. It involves the Australian Ministers for Foreign Affairs and Defence as well as the US Secretaries of State and Defense, with senior officials from both portfolios.

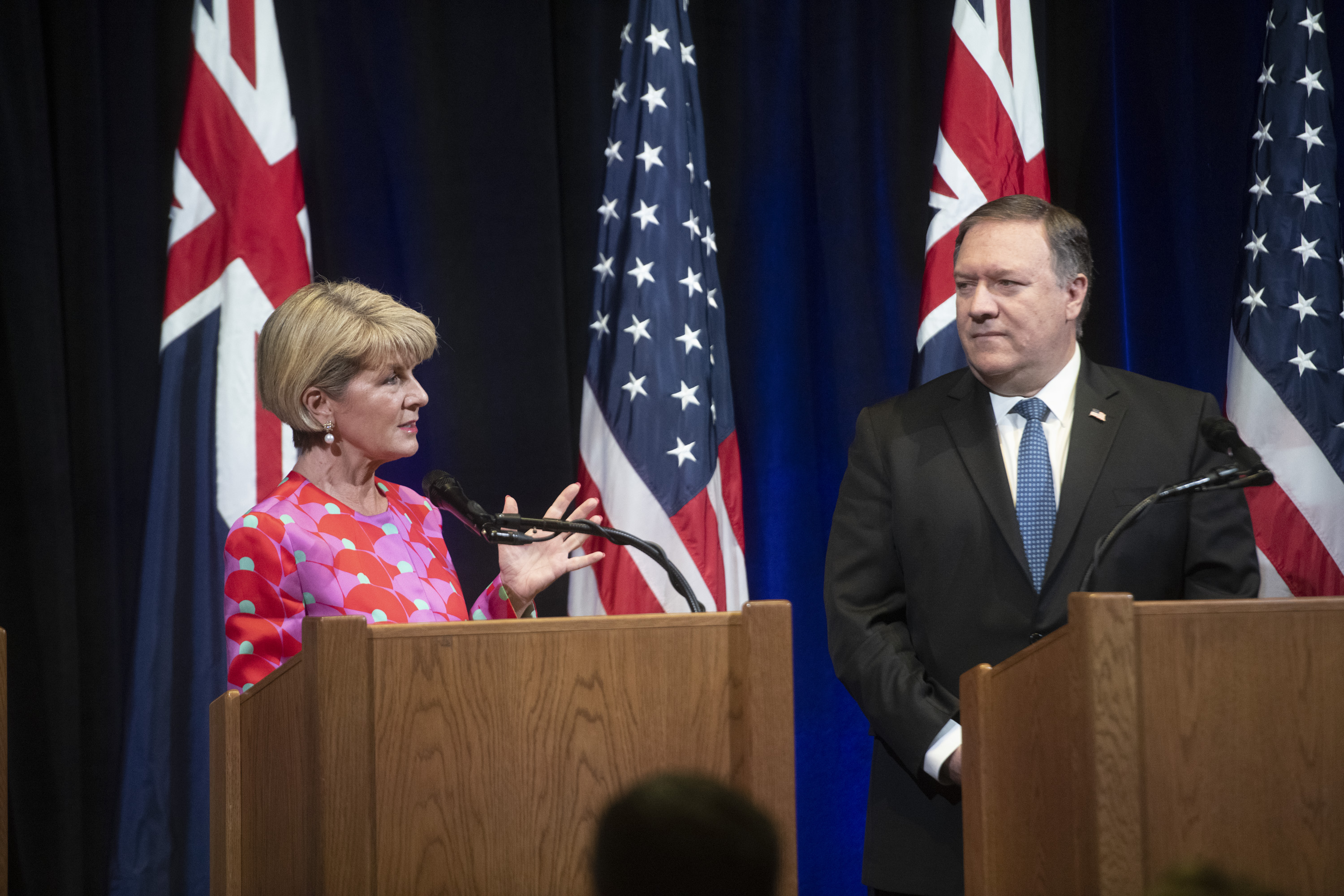
Julie Bishop and Mike Pompeo at AUSMIN 2018

The events are important in the relationship between Australia and the United States, and they enable discussion on major global and regional political issues, as well as deepening bilateral foreign security and defense cooperation.

== 60th anniversary of ANZUS ==
The Australia-United States Ministerial consultations were held in the United States on 15 September 2011. The 2011 event marked the 60th anniversary of the Australia, New Zealand, and United States (ANZUS) alliance. It was attended by US Secretary of Defense Leon Panetta, US Secretary of State Hillary Clinton, the Australian Minister for Foreign Affairs Kevin Rudd, and the Australian Minister for Defence Stephen Smith.

== 2012 ==
The 2012 consultations were held in Perth, Western Australia.

== 2023 ==
The 2023 meetings were held in Brisbane, Queensland. Lloyd Austin and US Secretary of State Antony Blinken were hosted by Penny Wong and Richard Marles. It was the first time Australia has hosted the annual discussions since 2019.
