= Embassy of the United States, Canberra =

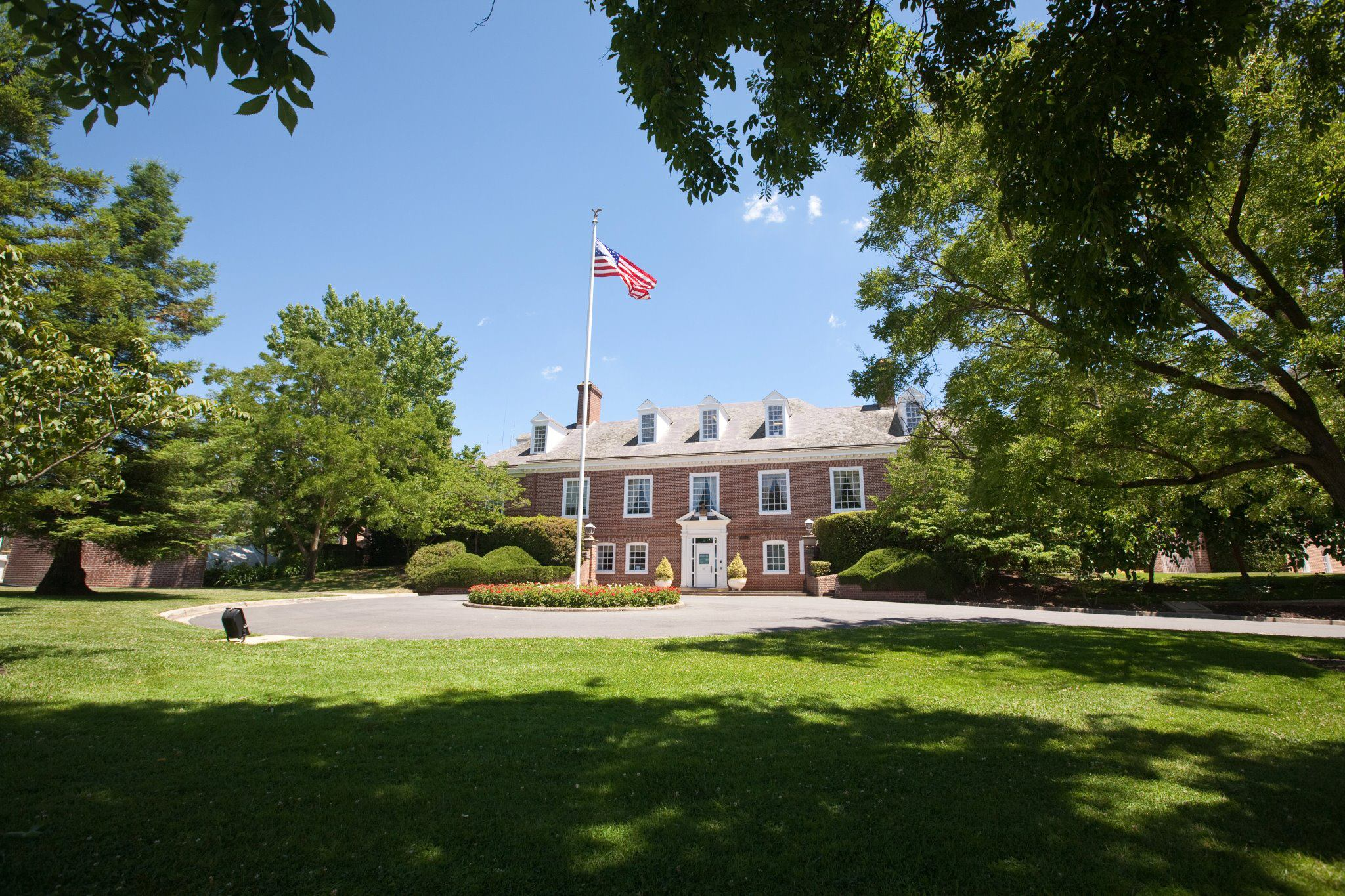
- Chancery building
- Location: Yarralumla, Canberra, Australian Capital Territory, Australia
- Coordinates: 35°18′26″S 149°7′2″E
- Opened: 9 July 1946
- Ambassador: Erika Olsen, Chargé d'affaires

The Embassy of the United States in Canberra is the embassy of the United States to Australia. It is one of the largest embassies in the Australian capital Canberra, located in the centrally located suburb of Yarralumla. It is situated close to The Lodge, the official Canberra residence of the prime minister, and is equally close to Parliament House, the centre of Australia's government. Built in the Georgian style of architecture, it was founded in 1942 and occupied by the end of the next year.

The embassy has several functions, including communicating and collaborating with Australian media, issuing passports and visas, assisting US citizens living in Australia, and presenting forums with visiting American experts. The mission has also helped prepare food for in need Australians in co-operation with the Our Big Kitchen organisation of Sydney. The staff also organises and arranges for key figures and thinkers in Australia to visit the United States to share ideas with American counterparts.

The office of the United States ambassador to Australia is currently vacant with Erika Olsen as the chargé d'affaires effective on January 20, 2025.

== History ==
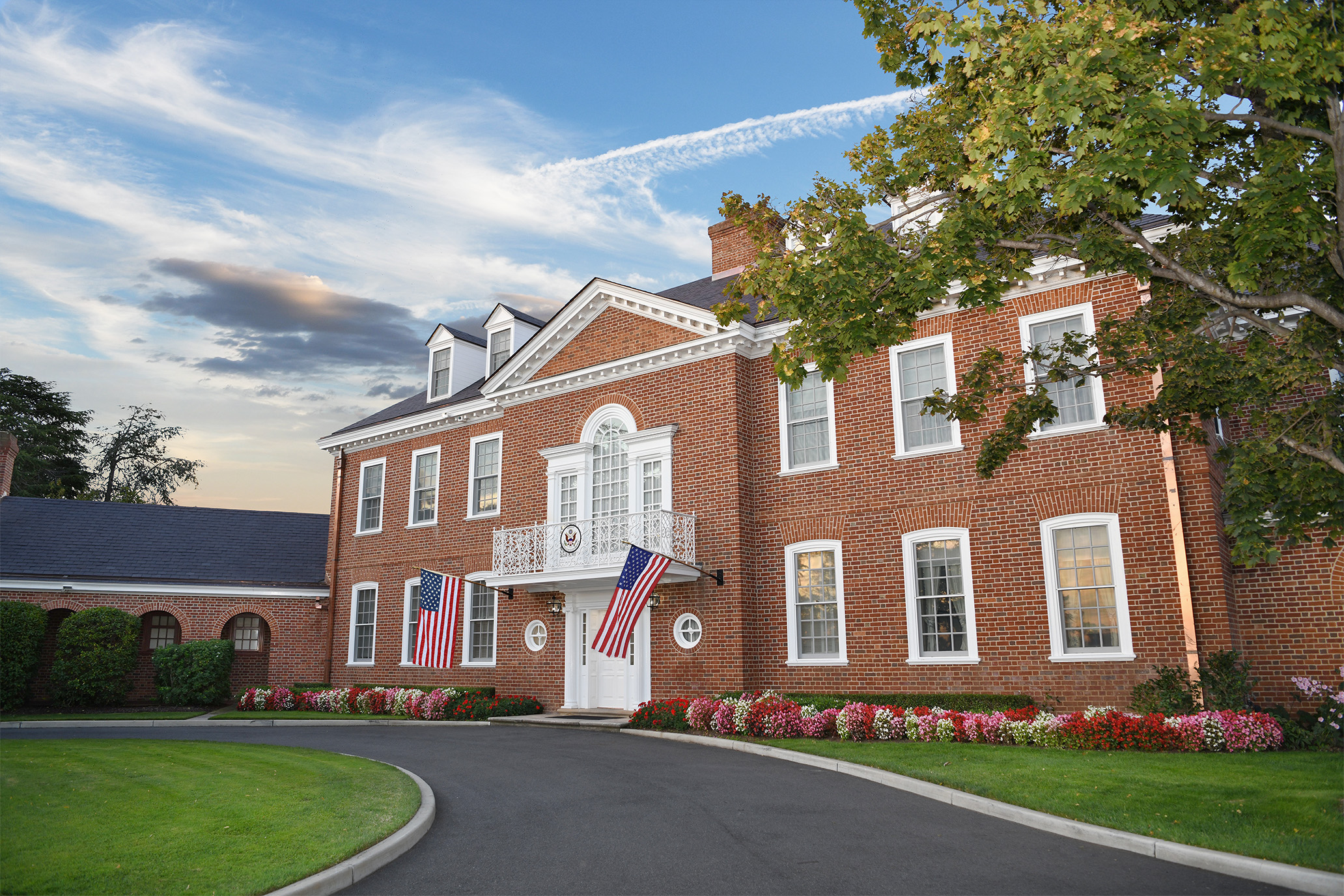
Ambassador's Residence

Australia was recognised as a country by the United States and diplomatic relations were established between the US and Australia in 1940. The foundation stone for the current ambassador's Residence was laid on 4 June 1942, and the residence was occupied by Christmas 1943. The site was advanced to embassy status on 9 July 1946. On 25 September, Robert Butler presented his credentials as Ambassador Extraordinary and Plenipotentiary of the United States of America to the Australian Government, becoming the first ambassador to Australia.

== Architecture and construction ==
The embassy was designed in order to show off typically classical American architecture to Australians while still blending in with Canberra's atmosphere. The final design chosen is a Georgian style, examples of which could be seen in the 17th and 18th centuries in southern parts of the United States. The blueprints were inspired by buildings designed by Christopher Wren for the colonial town of Williamsburg, Virginia. The architect was Frederick Larkin, working for the Department of State’s Foreign Building Office. He was supervised by an Australian architect, Malcolm Moir.

This style of architecture was chosen as Williamsburg is seen as having been a center of liberty and freedom in the colonial times, as well as a concentration of communal, political and artistic action.

The materials used for construction were mostly Australian-based. An exception of this occurred in 1959, when the Chancery’s expansion required bricks to match the existing style. The Canberra location that had previously kilned the bricks was no longer available, and as no other convenient location was available, bricks were transported from kilns located near Williamsburg in the United States.

The main floors of the residence are either Australian wood or Australian white marble from southern New South Wales, with the exception of the entrance hall, which has the same Australian white marble in a checkered pattern with Belgian black marble. Additionally, sandstone paves the way to the solarium, and jarrah parquetry is utilised for the main floor, with tallowwood parquetry for the upper floor. Finally, linoleum on pine flooring is used for flooring service areas. Outside, the roof is Bangor slate, with entrance columns and other stone adornments made of Hawkesbury sandstone.

Residence equipment mostly originates in the United States, as does the flag pole and furniture, creating what the embassy calls a "happy blending of Australian and American materials and craftsmanship."

== Security concerns ==
=== September 11 attacks ===
Following the terrorist attacks on the World Trade Center in New York City and The Pentagon, road blocks were set up around the US Embassy in Canberra. Additional officers were brought in to increase security at the mission in the morning hours, with all vehicles entering the premises checked and Australian police cars stationed at every gate. In addition, access to other embassies in the area was restricted.

=== Following airstrikes in Afghanistan ===
On 7 October 2001, the United States military began carrying out airstrikes against Taliban and al-Qaeda training camps in Afghanistan as part of Operation Enduring Freedom. The following day, roads around the US Embassy in Canberra were closed off due to fears of retaliatory strikes or protests.

=== Protests of 2003 ===
On 23 October 2003, a crowd of approximately 3,000 protestors held demonstrations outside the nearby Parliament House. The protests centered on President George W. Bush, who arrived in Canberra earlier that day. As a planned rally, the protesters marched through streets that were closed off ahead of time. Due to an alleged militant presence in the crowd, temporary plastic barrier fencing was torn down outside the US Embassy, star pickets were thrown at guards, and minor fights between police and protesters erupted outside the mission. The crowds later moved on with few injuries sustained.

=== Gate-crashing incident of 2013 ===
On 10 July 2013, Adrian Richardson from Queensland checked out of an adult mental health facility and drove slowly around the US Embassy at about 6:00 pm. Soon after, he switched off his headlights, revved his engine, and crashed his car into the US Embassy's gates, causing A$15,000 of damage. Canberra's bomb unit responded to the attack, along with police, ambulance, fire, and rescue crews. Roads were also closed around the embassy.

A mental health assessment was ordered by a court, and Richardson was charged with damaging the premises of an internationally protected person. He gave multiple reasons for his actions, including being a journalist seeking a visa, and being the victim of a Chinese plot. Richardson was placed on psychiatric order for three years after being diagnosed with a psychotic illness and pleading not guilty by mental impairment.

== Ambassadors ==
Erika Olson is the current United States Ambassador to Australia.

== Offices ==
The sections of the embassy include Public Affairs, Economic Affairs, Political Affairs, Commercial Affairs, and Agricultural Affairs, as well as Management, Office of Defense Cooperation, the Defense Attaché, and the Consular section. In addition, there are representatives of other US government agencies at the embassy, like the Department of Justice and the Drug Enforcement Administration (DEA).

== See also ==
- Australia–United States relations
- List of ambassadors of the United States to Australia
- Embassy of Australia, Washington, D.C.
- List of ambassadors of Australia to the United States
- List of consuls-general of Australia in New York
- List of diplomatic missions of the United States
- List of diplomatic missions in Australia
