= Midwinter Ball =

Australian annual political event

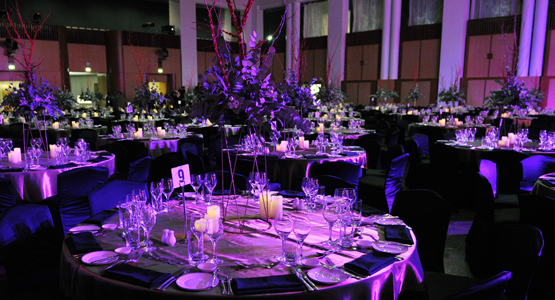
Great Hall during the Midwinter Ball dinner

The Midwinter Ball is an annual dinner event held in Canberra, Australia. It is hosted by the Federal Parliamentary Press Gallery. The event is notable for being regularly attended by Australian high society.

Among regular attendees of the dinner are political leaders (e.g. the Australian Prime Minister and the Leader of the Opposition); as well as staffers, journalists, celebrities, and prominent members of the business community.

Organisers of the event describe its purpose as to 'bring together the journalistic, political, and corporate chiefs of Australia', in a night of 'entertainment, networking opportunities, and charity'.

== Event details ==
The event is loosely modeled upon the White House Correspondents annual gala dinner held in Washington, D.C..

It is held in the third week of June each year. The dress code is black tie, and the traditional venue is the Great Hall of Parliament House.

Tickets are unavailable to members of the general public. Requests for tickets may only be made by full-time residents of either the Press Gallery, or Members of either of the Houses of Parliament and their staff. The number of attendees to the event is strictly limited to a total of 640, due to the limited capacity of the Great Hall and for reasons of exclusivity.

A speech is given at the event by the incumbent prime minister and the leader of the opposition. Function rules prior to 2019 prohibited the reporting of speech contents by attendees (although this protocol was occasionally breached). Starting from the 2019 ball onwards the speech has been publicly broadcast.

=== Charitable auction tradition ===
Politicians attending the ball have traditionally raised money for charity, through auctioning access to their time. For example, in 2014 then-prime minister Tony Abbott raised $15,100 for charity through auctioning a dinner with him. Another notable bid was $3,000 raised from a forestry association in return for a dinner with the Australian Greens.

As of June 2020, the ball has raised a total of $4.5M in charitable contributions over its 20 years of events.

=== Themes ===
Each year, the event is organized around a particular theme. The first Midwinter Ball, held in 2000, had the theme 'Inaugural Cabaret'.

The other themes have been:

- Winter Wonderland (2001)
- Year of the Outback (2002)
- Parliamentary Circus (2003)
- The Opulence of the Orient (2004)
- The Australian Dream (2005)
- Showgirl (2006)
- 18th Century Splendour (2007)
- All that Glitters (2008)
- 10th Anniversary (2009)
- Kick Up Your Heels! (2010)
- Celebrate in Style (2011)
- La Dolce Vita (2012)
- Oh Là Là (2013)
- Puttin' on the Ritz (2014)
- Winter Wonderland (2015)
- Into the Future (2016)
- Our Bush Capital (2017)
- Spring (2018)
- Tropical (2019)

=== Sponsors ===
The ball is supported by numerous prominent corporate bodies. Notable sponsors of the event include ebay, Coca-Cola, the Australian Broadcasting Corporation, PayPal, Westpac, Nine Entertainment, Uber, Google, Macquarie Group, News Corporation, Woodside, Telstra, Johnson & Johnson, PwC, Qantas, the Special Broadcasting Service, Woolworths Group, Shell, Salesforce, Sony Music, the Australian Recording Industry Association, and the Department of Parliamentary Services.

== Notable attendees ==
All Australian Prime Ministers since the year 2000 have at some point attended the Midwinter Ball, usually attending each year. The same is true for all leaders of the opposition, and most minor party leaders such as the Australian Greens. The US ambassador to Australia is another notable regular attendee.

Celebrities known to have attended the ball include Buzz Aldrin, and Sam Neill.

Prominent business people known to have attended the ball include Kerry Stokes, Michael Ebeid, and Robert Costa.

Among performers who have been invited to the ball, are the new wave band Mental As Anything, Jessica Mauboy, Marcia Hines, Shaun Micallef, Julian Morrow, David Campbell, Christine Anu, Björn Again, Paulini, and Grace Knight.

Journalists known have attended the event include Latika Bourke, Laura Tingle, Annabel Crabb and David Speers.

== Controversies ==
The Midwinter Ball has been the venue for a number of reported controversies in Australian public life. A staffer to Sophie Mirabella had his career ended after allegedly groping a woman at the event. It has also been reported in The Australian that Kevin Rudd's speech to the Midwinter ball as prime minister was 'so unfunny it surely contributed to his political demise a few days later.

An impersonation of Donald Trump made by then prime minister Malcolm Turnbull caused a minor diplomatic stir in 2017 after being recorded and leaked. The recording of the speech was criticised by politicians on both sides of the aisle, some decrying the recording as "unethical", while others described the incident as having "damaged politicians' belief in the mid-winter ball as somewhere they can let their hair down". The incident led speeches being broadcast publicly from the 2019 event onwards.

Prime Minister Scott Morrison's speech to the ball a few weeks after becoming prime minister, was infamously heckled by Greens Senator Sarah Hanson-Young who shouted "bring back Malcolm [Turnbull]" throughout his speech.

== See also ==
- Federal Parliamentary Press Gallery
- White House Correspondents' Association
- White House Correspondents Dinner
