= American Freedom Mortgage =

American banking corporation

American Freedom Mortgage, Inc.
- Type: S Corporation
- Industry: Subprime Mortgage Lending and Alt-A Mortgage Lending
- Founded: Marietta, Georgia, 2001
- Defunct: January 30, 2007
- Fate: Bankruptcy
- Headquarters: Atlanta, Georgia (original headquarters); Marietta, Georgia (2nd headquarters)
- Key people: Tamara L. Burch, co-founder, President and CEO; DeeAnn R. Myers, co-founder, Vice-President and COO

American Freedom Mortgage, Inc. (AFM) was a private S Corporation incorporated on February 2, 2001, according to the Georgia Secretary of State, and headquartered in Marietta, Georgia. AFM conducted business as a multi-state direct-to-consumer correspondent lender and mortgage broker specializing in the origination of subprime and Alt-A mortgage loans. AFM also operated a wholesale mortgage lending division that originated loans via approved mortgage brokers and which used the fictitious name AFMI Funding. As a correspondent lender, AFM sold the mortgage loans on the open market to larger investors.

According to an article in The Wall Street Journal, AFM originated loans for a fee, then sold them to investors such as HSBC Mortgage Services, Inc. and mortgage-finance company Countrywide Financial Corporation.

The CEO of AFM was Tamara Burch and the COO was DeeAnn Myers. Prior to co-founding AFM, both Burch and Myers were loan originators with St. Louis, Missouri-based American Equity Mortgage, Inc., a leading subprime mortgage lender.

On January 30, 2007, AFM and Burch both filed voluntary "no asset" Chapter 7 bankruptcy petitions in the United States Bankruptcy Court for the Northern District of Georgia. Both the AFM and Burch bankruptcy cases were subsequently converted to "asset" cases by the Bankruptcy Trustee after assets for distribution to unsecured creditors were discovered. The AFM bankruptcy case was assigned Case No. 07-61304-jem.

== Subprime and Alt-A mortgage lending activities ==
Tamara Burch (left) and DeeAnn Myers (right) accepting the 2003 Consumers' Choice Award for Business Excellence

At the beginning of 2006, AFM was a leading subprime and Alt-A mortgage correspondent lender and mortgage broker in the United States. Subprime mortgage loans are riskier loans in that they are made to borrowers unable to qualify under traditional, more stringent criteria due to a limited or blemished credit history. Subprime borrowers are generally defined as individuals with limited income or having FICO credit scores below 620 on a scale that ranges from 300 to 850. Subprime mortgage loans have a much higher rate of default than prime mortgage loans and are priced based on the risk assumed by the lender. Alt-A loans are generally prime (i.e., FICO credit scores of 680 or higher) or near-prime (i.e., FICO credit scores from 620 - 679) loans with some form of reduced documentation requirements (e.g., "stated income", "stated assets", "no income verification").

Although most home loans do not fall into this category, subprime mortgages proliferated in the early 2000s. Subprime mortgages totaled US$600 billion in 2006, accounting for 23.5% of the U.S. home loan market.

== Subprime mortgage crisis and bankruptcy ==
As with many subprime mortgage lenders, AFM experienced financial difficulties in 2006 due to repurchase demands from investors and diminished funding capacity because of an increase in non-performing loans. In August 2006, AFM held an auction at its corporate headquarters to sell its assets.

In February 2007, HSBC Mortgage Services, Inc. commenced litigation against AFM in the Northern District of Illinois based on assigned loans that resulted in early payment defaults, a repurchase event pursuant to the governing loan purchase agreement. Court documents indicate Countrywide Financial Corporation was also demanding repurchase of some loans it purchased from AFM. In March 2007, The Wall Street Journal reported many lenders, including HSBC Mortgage Services and Countrywide, were demanding AFM repurchase loans pursuant to repurchase provisions contained in loan purchase agreements.

AFM's financial difficulties were exacerbated by advertising commitments that exceeded the company's ability to meet. David Hal Burch, Tamara Burch's husband, was the director of marketing for AFM and responsible for AFM's advertising campaigns.

== See also ==
- United States housing bubble
- 2007 subprime mortgage financial crisis
- Mortgage
- Subprime lending
- Alt-A mortgage lending
- Collateralized debt obligation
- List of entities involved in 2007 finance crises
- United States housing market correction
- Phillip E. Hill, Sr.
