= Global financial crisis in September 2008 =

The subprime mortgage crisis reached a critical stage during the first week of September 2008, characterized by severely contracted liquidity in the global credit markets and insolvency threats to investment banks and other institutions.

== US government takeover of home mortgage lenders ==
The United States director of the Federal Housing Finance Agency (FHFA), James B. Lockhart III, on September 7, 2008, announced his decision to place two United States government-sponsored enterprises (GSEs), Fannie Mae (Federal National Mortgage Association) and Freddie Mac (Federal Home Loan Mortgage Corporation), into conservatorship run by FHFA. United States Treasury Secretary Henry Paulson, at the same press conference stated that placing the two GSEs into conservatorship was a decision he fully supported, and said that he advised "that conservatorship was the only form in which I would commit taxpayer money to the GSEs." He further said that "I attribute the need for today's action primarily to the inherent conflict and flawed business model embedded in the GSE structure, and to the ongoing housing correction." The same day, Federal Reserve Bank Chairman Ben Bernanke stated in support: "I strongly endorse both the decision by FHFA Director Lockhart to place Fannie Mae and Freddie Mac into conservatorship and the actions taken by Treasury Secretary Paulson to ensure the financial soundness of those two companies."

== Developing global financial crisis ==
Dow Jones Industrial Average Jan 2006 - Nov 2008

Beginning with bankruptcy of Lehman Brothers at midnight Monday, September 15, 2008, the financial crisis entered an acute phase marked by failures of prominent American and European banks and efforts by the American and European governments to rescue distressed financial institutions, in the United States by passage of the Emergency Economic Stabilization Act of 2008 and in European countries by infusion of capital into major banks. Afterwards, Iceland almost claimed to go bankrupt as the country's three largest banks, and in effect financial system, collapsed. Many financial institutions in Europe also faced the liquidity problem that they needed to raise their capital adequacy ratio. As the crisis developed, stock markets fell worldwide, and global financial regulators attempted to coordinate efforts to contain the crisis. The US government composed a $700 billion plan to purchase unperforming collaterals and assets. However, the plan failed to pass because some members of the US Congress rejected the idea of using taxpayers' money to bail out Wall Street investment bankers. After the stock market plunged, Congress amended the $700 billion bail out plan and passed the legislation. The market sentiment continued to deteriorate, however, and the global financial system almost collapsed. While the market turned extremely pessimistic, the British government launched a 500 billion pound bail out plan aimed at injecting capital into the financial system. The British government nationalized most of the financial institutions in trouble. Many European governments followed suit, as well as the US government. Stock markets appeared to have stabilized as October ended. In addition, the falling prices due to reduced demand for oil, coupled with projections of a global recession, brought the 2000s energy crisis to temporary resolution. In the Eastern European economies of Poland, Hungary, Romania, and Ukraine the economic crisis was characterized by difficulties with loans made in hard currencies such as the Swiss franc. As local currencies in those countries lost value, making payment on such loans became progressively more difficult.

As the financial panic developed during September and October 2008, there was a "flight-to-quality" as investors sought safety in U.S. Treasury bonds, gold, and currencies such as the US dollar (still widely perceived as the world's reserve currency) and the Yen (mainly through unwinding of carry trades). This currency crisis threatened to disrupt international trade and produced strong pressure on all world currencies. The International Monetary Fund had limited resources relative to the needs of the many nations with currency under pressure or near collapse.

A further shift towards assets that are perceived as tangible, sustainable, like gold or land (as opposed to "paper assets") was anticipated. However, as events progressed during early 2009, it was U.S. Treasury bonds which were the main refuge chosen. This inflow of money into the United States translated into an outflow from other countries restricting their ability to raise money for local rescue efforts.

== Major US financial firms' crisis ==
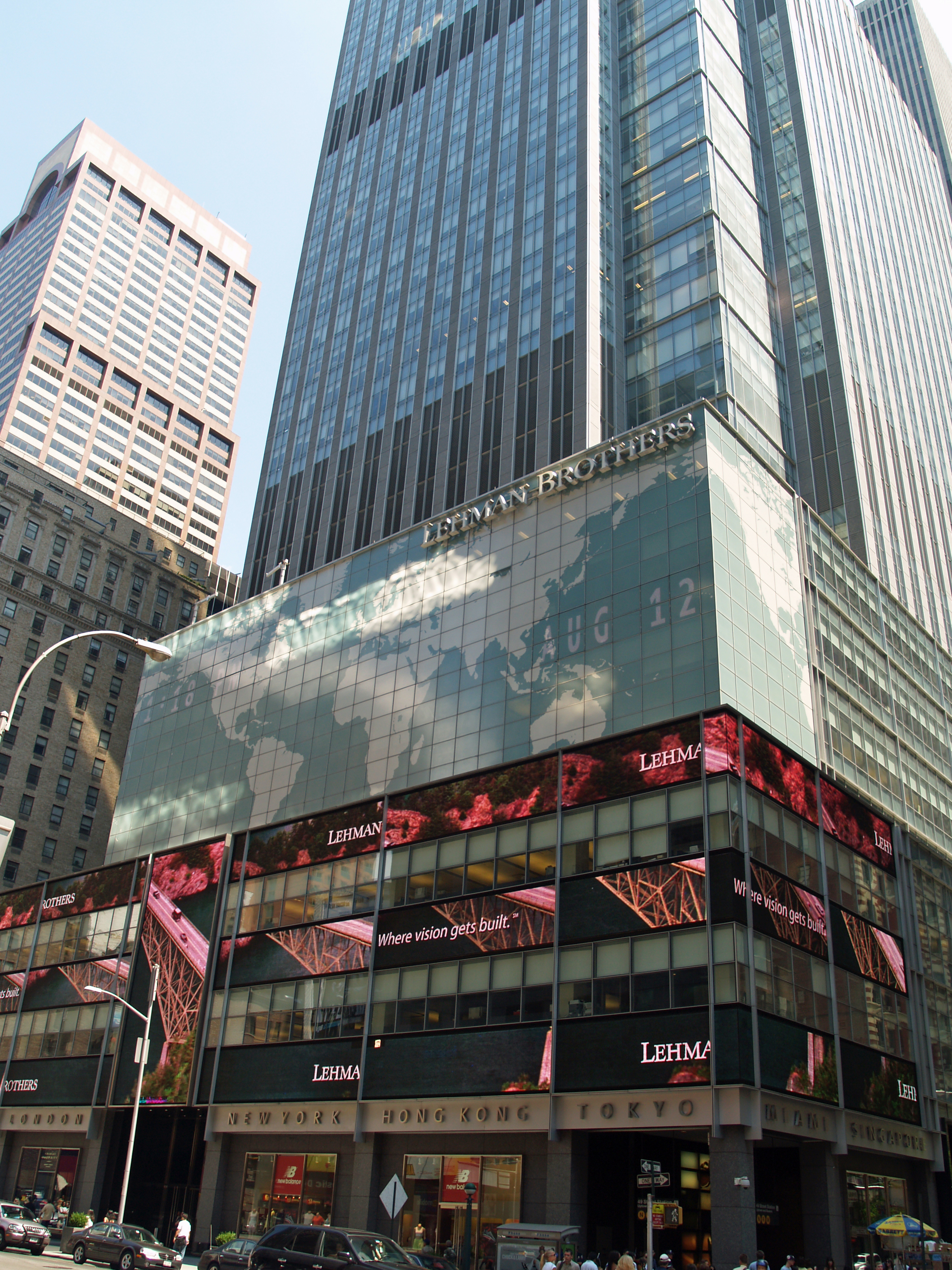
The collapse of Lehman Brothers was a symbol of the global financial crisis

On Sunday, September 14, it was announced that Lehman Brothers would file for bankruptcy after the Federal Reserve Bank declined to participate in creating a financial support facility for Lehman Brothers. The significance of the Lehman Brothers bankruptcy is disputed with some assigning it a pivotal role in the unfolding of subsequent events. The principals involved, Ben Bernanke and Henry Paulson, dispute this view, citing a volume of toxic assets at Lehman which made a rescue impossible. Immediately following the bankruptcy, JPMorgan Chase provided the broker dealer unit of Lehman Brothers with $138 billion to "settle securities transactions with customers of Lehman and its clearance parties" according to a statement made in a New York City Bankruptcy court filing.

The same day, the sale of Merrill Lynch to Bank of America was announced. The beginning of the week was marked by extreme instability in global stock markets, with dramatic drops in market values on Monday, September 15, and Wednesday, September 17. On September 16, the large insurer American International Group (AIG), a significant participant in the credit default swaps markets, suffered a liquidity crisis following the downgrade of its credit rating. The Federal Reserve, at AIG's request, and after AIG had shown that it could not find lenders willing to save it from insolvency, created a credit facility for up to US$85 billion in exchange for a 79.9% equity interest, and the right to suspend dividends to previously issued common and preferred stock.

=== Money market funds insurance and short sales prohibitions ===
On September 16, the Reserve Primary Fund, a large money market mutual fund, lowered its share price below $1 because of exposure to Lehman debt securities. This resulted in demands from investors to return their funds as the financial crisis mounted. By the morning of September 18, money market sell orders from institutional investors totalled $0.5 trillion, out of a total market capitalization of $4 trillion, but a $105 billion liquidity injection from the Federal Reserve averted an immediate collapse. On September 19 the U.S. Treasury offered temporary insurance (akin to Federal Deposit Insurance Corporation insurance of bank accounts) to money market funds. Toward the end of the week, short selling of financial stocks was suspended by the Financial Services Authority in the United Kingdom and by the Securities and Exchange Commission in the United States. Similar measures were taken by authorities in other countries. Some restoration of market confidence occurred with the publicity surrounding efforts of the Treasury and the Securities Exchange Commission

=== US Troubled Asset Relief Program ===
On September 19, 2008, a plan intended to ameliorate the difficulties caused by the subprime mortgage crisis was proposed by the Secretary of the Treasury, Henry Paulson. He proposed a Troubled Assets Relief Program (TARP), later incorporated into the Emergency Economic Stabilization Act, which would permit the United States government to purchase illiquid assets, informally termed toxic assets, from financial institutions. The value of the securities is extremely difficult to determine.

Consultations between the Secretary of the Treasury, the Chairman of the Federal Reserve, and the Chairman of the U.S. Securities and Exchange Commission, Congressional leaders and the President of the United States moved forward plans to advance a comprehensive solution to the problems created by illiquid mortgage-backed securities. Of this time the President later said: "... I was told by [my] chief economic advisors that the situation we were facing could be worse than the Great Depression."

At the close of the week the Secretary of the Treasury and President Bush announced a proposal for the federal government to buy up to US$700 billion of illiquid mortgage-backed securities with the intent to increase the liquidity of the secondary mortgage markets and reduce potential losses encountered by financial institutions owning the securities. The draft proposal of the plan was received favorably by investors in the stock market. Details of the bailout remained to be acted upon by Congress.

== Week of September 21 ==
On Sunday, September 21, the two remaining US investment banks, Goldman Sachs and Morgan Stanley, with the approval of the Federal Reserve, converted to bank holding companies, a status subject to more regulation, but with readier access to capital. On September 21, Treasury Secretary Henry Paulson announced that the original proposal, which would have excluded foreign banks, had been widened to include foreign financial institutions with a presence in the US. The US administration was pressuring other countries to set up similar bailout plans.

On Monday and Tuesday during the week of September 22, appearances were made by the US Secretary of the Treasury and the chairman of the Board of Governors of the Federal Reserve before Congressional committees and on Wednesday a prime-time presidential address was delivered by the President of the United States on television. Behind the scenes, negotiations were held refining the proposal which had grown to 42 pages from its original 3 and was reported to include both an oversight structure and limitations on executive salaries, with other provisions under consideration.

On September 25, agreement was reported by congressional leaders on the basics of the package; however, general and vocal opposition to the proposal was voiced by the public. On Thursday afternoon at a White House meeting attended by congressional leaders and the presidential candidates, John McCain and Barack Obama, it became clear that there was no congressional consensus, with Republican representatives and the ranking member of the Senate Banking Committee, Richard C. Shelby, strongly opposing the proposal. The alternative advanced by conservative House Republicans was to create a system of mortgage insurance funded by fees on those holding mortgages; as the working week ended, negotiations continued on the plan, which had grown to 102 pages and included mortgage insurance as an option. On Thursday evening Washington Mutual, the nation's largest savings and loan, was seized by the Federal Deposit Insurance Corporation and most of its assets transferred to JPMorgan Chase. Wachovia, one of the largest US banks, was reported to be in negotiations with Citigroup and other financial institutions.

== Week of September 28 ==
Early on Sunday morning an announcement was made by the United States Secretary of the Treasury and congressional leaders that agreement had been reached on all major issues: the total amount of $700 billion remained with provision for the option of creating a scheme of mortgage insurance.

It was reported on Sunday, September 28, that a rescue plan had been crafted for the British mortgage lender Bradford & Bingley. Grupo Santander, the largest bank in Spain, was slated to take over the offices and savings accounts while the mortgage and loans business would be nationalized.

Fortis, a huge Benelux banking and finance company was partially nationalized on September 28, 2008, with Belgium, the Netherlands and Luxembourg investing a total of €11.2 billion (US$16.3 billion) in the bank. Belgium will purchase 49% of Fortis's Belgian division, with the Netherlands doing the same for the Dutch division. Luxembourg has agreed to a loan convertible into a 49% share of Fortis's Luxembourg division.

It was reported on Monday morning, September 29, that Wachovia, the 4th largest bank in the United States, would be acquired by Citigroup.

On Monday the German finance minister announced a rescue of Hypo Real Estate, a Munich-based holding company comprising a number of real estate financing banks, but the deal collapsed on Saturday, October 4.

The same day the government of Iceland nationalized Glitnir, Iceland's third largest lender.

Stocks fell dramatically Monday in Europe and the US despite infusion of funds into the market for short term credit. In the US the Dow dropped 777.68 points (6.98%), then the largest one-day point-drop in history (but only the 17th largest percentage drop).

The U.S. bailout plan, now named the Emergency Economic Stabilization Act of 2008 and expanded to 110 pages was slated for consideration in the House of Representatives on Monday, September 29 as HR 3997 and in the Senate later in the week. The plan failed after the vote being held open for 40 minutes in the House of Representatives, 205 for the plan, 228 against. Meanwhile, the Federal Reserve announced it will inject $630 billion into the global financial system to increase the liquidity of dollars worldwide as US stock markets suffered steep declines, the Dow losing 300 points in a matter of minutes, ending down 777.68 (6.98%), the Nasdaq losing 199.61 (9.14%), falling below the 2,000 point mark, and the S&P 500 off 106.62 (8.79%) for the day. By the end of the day, the Dow suffered the largest drop in the history of the index. The S&P 500 Banking Index fell 14% on September 29 with drops in the stock value of a number of US banks generally considered sound, including Bank of New York Mellon, State Street and Northern Trust; three Ohio banks, National City, Fifth Third, and KeyBank were down dramatically.

On Tuesday, September 30, stocks rebounded but credit markets remained tight with the London Interbank Offered Rate (overnight dollar Libor) rising 4.7% to 6.88%. US$9 billion was made available by the French, Belgian and Luxembourg governments to the French-Belgian bank Dexia.

After Irish banks came under pressure on Monday, September 29, the Irish government undertook a two-year "guarantee arrangement to safeguard all deposits (retail, commercial, institutional and inter-bank), covered bonds, senior debt and dated subordinated debt (lower tier II)" of 6 Irish banks: Allied Irish Banks, Bank of Ireland, Anglo Irish Bank, Irish Life and Permanent, Irish Nationwide and the EBS Building Society; the potential liability involved is about 400 billion dollars.

== Key risk indicators in September ==
The TED spread – an indicator of credit risk – increased dramatically during September 2008.

Key risk indicators became highly volatile during September 2008, a factor leading the U.S. government to pass the Emergency Economic Stabilization Act of 2008. The "TED spread" is a measure of credit risk for inter-bank lending. It is the difference between: 1) the risk-free three-month U.S. treasury bill rate; and 2) the three-month London InterBank Offered Rate (LIBOR), which represents the rate at which banks typically lend to each other. A higher spread indicates banks perceive each other as riskier counterparties. The t-bill is considered "risk-free" because the full faith and credit of the U.S. government is behind it; theoretically, the government could just print money so that the principal is fully repaid at maturity. The TED spread reached record levels in late September 2008. The diagram indicates that the Treasury yield movement was a more significant driver than the changes in LIBOR. A three-month t-bill yield so close to zero means that people are willing to forgo interest just to keep their money (principal) safe for three months – a very high level of risk aversion and indicative of tight lending conditions. Driving this change were investors shifting funds from money market funds (generally considered nearly risk free but paying a slightly higher rate of return than t-bills) and other investment types to t-bills. These issues are consistent with the September 2008 aspects of the subprime mortgage crisis which prompted the Emergency Economic Stabilization Act of 2008 signed into law by U.S. President George W. Bush on October 2, 2008.

In addition, an increase in LIBOR means that financial instruments with variable interest terms are increasingly expensive. For example, car loans and credit card interest rates are often tied to LIBOR; some estimate as much as $150 trillion in loans and derivatives are tied to LIBOR. Furthermore, the basis swap between one-month LIBOR and three-month LIBOR increased from 30 basis points in the beginning of September to a high of over 100 basis points. Financial institutions with liability exposure to 1 month LIBOR but funding from 3 month LIBOR faced increased funding costs. Overall, higher interest rates place additional downward pressure on consumption, increasing the risk of recession.

== See also ==
Stock markets worldwide fall dramatically

- Global financial crisis in October 2008
- Global financial crisis in November 2008
- Global financial crisis in December 2008
- Global financial crisis in 2009
- Subprime crisis impact timeline
- Timeline of the 2000s United States housing bubble for the pre-subprime crisis timeline
