= 2000s United States housing market correction =

United States housing prices experienced a major market correction after the housing bubble that peaked in early 2006. Prices of real estate then adjusted downwards in late 2006, causing a loss of market liquidity and subprime defaults.

A real estate bubble is a type of economic bubble that occurs periodically in local, regional, national or global real estate markets. A housing bubble is characterized by rapid and sustained increases in the price of real property, such as housing' usually due to some combination of over-confidence and emotion, fraud, the synthetic offloading of risk using mortgage-backed securities, the ability to repackage conforming debt via government-sponsored enterprises, public and central bank policy availability of credit, and speculation. Housing bubbles tend to distort valuations upward relative to historic, sustainable, and statistical norms as described by economists Karl Case and Robert Shiller in their book, Irrational Exuberance. As early as 2003 Shiller questioned whether or not there was, "a bubble in the housing market" that might in the near future correct.

== Timeline ==
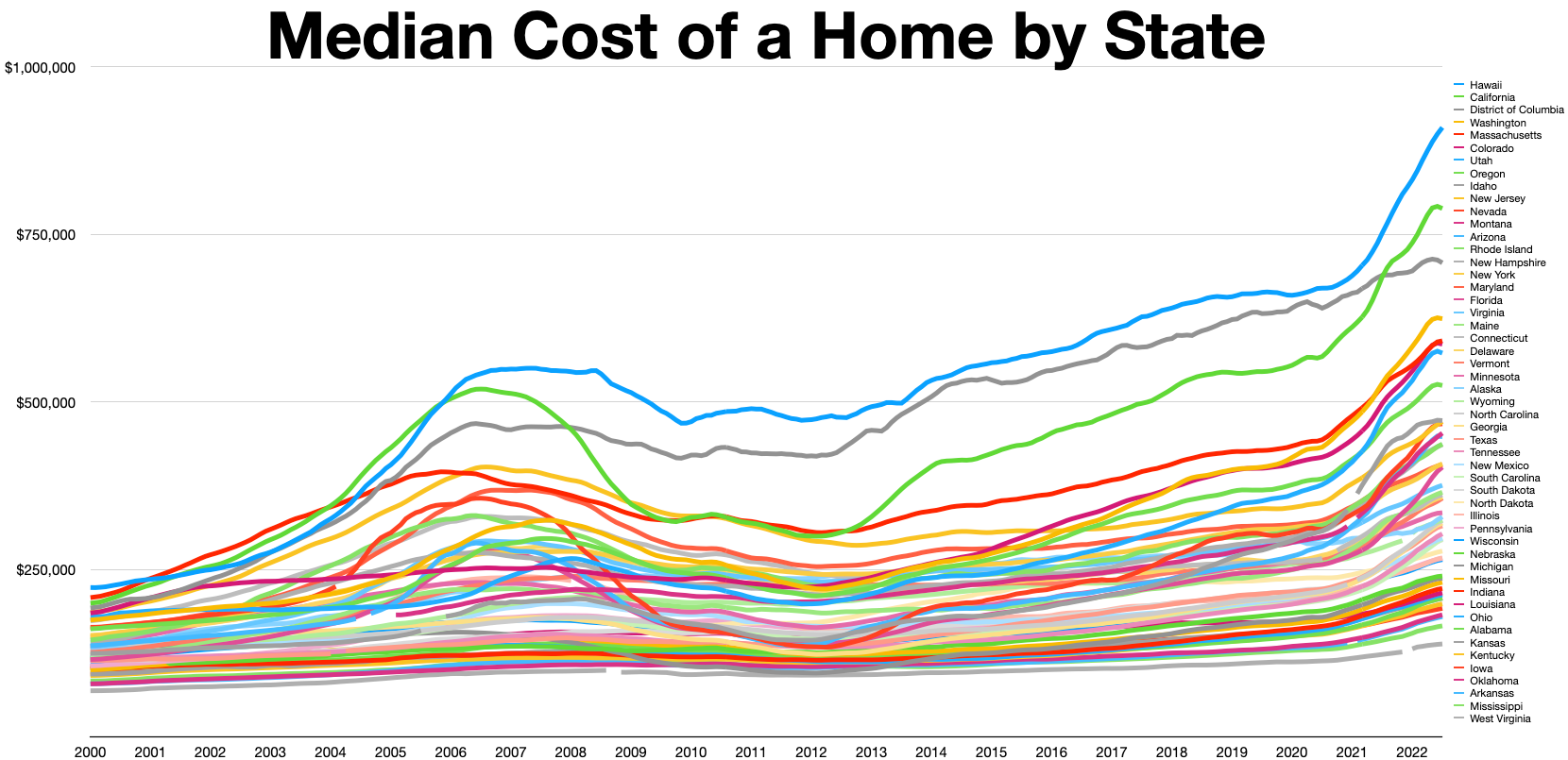
Cost of housing by State

== Market correction predictions ==
Percentage change of the Case-Shiller Home Price Index for the housing correction beginning in 2006 (red) and the correction (blue) beginning in 1989, comparing monthly CSI values from the peak value seen just prior to the first declining month all the way through the downturn and the full recovery of home prices

Based on the historic trends in valuations of U.S. housing, many economists and business writers predicted a market correction, ranging from a few percentage points, to 50% or more from peak values in some markets, and, although this cooling did not affect all areas of the United States, some warned that the correction could and would be "nasty" and "severe".

Chief economist Mark Zandi of the research firm Moody's Economy.com predicted a crash of double-digit depreciation in some U.S. cities by 2007–2009. Dean Baker of the Center for Economic and Policy Research was the first economist to identify the housing bubble, in a report in the summer of 2002. Investor Peter Schiff acquired fame in a series of TV appearances where he opposed a multitude of financial experts and claimed that a bust was to come.

The housing bubble was partly subsidized by government-sponsored entities like Fannie Mae and Freddie Mac and federal policies intended to make housing affordable for all.

== Market weakness, 2005–06 ==
National Association of Realtors (NAR) chief economist David Lereah's Explanation of "What Happened" from the 2006 NAR Leadership Conference

- Boom ended August 2005
- Mortgage rates rose almost one point
- Affordability conditions deteriorated
- Speculative investors pulled out
- Homebuyer confidence plunged
- Resort buyers went to sidelines
- Trade-up buyers to sidelines
- First-time buyers priced out of market

Common indexes used for Adjustable Rate Mortgages (1996–2006)

The booming housing market halted abruptly in many parts of the United States in the late summer of 2005, and as of summer 2006, several markets faced ballooning inventories, falling prices, and sharply reduced sales volumes. In August 2006, Barron's magazine warned, "a housing crisis approaches", and noted that the median price of new homes had dropped almost 3% since January 2006, that new-home inventories hit a record in April and remained near all-time highs, that existing-home inventories were 39% higher than they were just one year earlier, and that sales were down more than 10%, and predicted that "the national median price of housing will probably fall by close to 30% in the next three years ... simple reversion to the mean."

In Boston, year-over-year prices dropped, sales fell, inventory increased, foreclosures were up, and the correction in Massachusetts was called a "hard landing" in 2005. The previously booming housing markets in Washington, D.C., San Diego, California, Phoenix, Arizona, and other cities stalled as well in 2005.

Fortune magazine in May 2006 labeled many previously strong housing markets as "Dead Zones"; other areas were classified as "Danger Zones" and "Safe Havens". Fortune in August 2005 also dispelled "four myths about the future of home prices".

The Arizona Regional Multiple Listing Service (ARMLS) showed that in summer 2006, the for-sale housing inventory in Phoenix had grown to over 50,000 homes, of which nearly half were vacant (see graphic). Several home builders revised their forecasts sharply downward during the summer of 2006, e.g., D.R. Horton cut its yearly earnings forecast by one-third in July 2006, the value of luxury home builder Toll Brothers' stock fell 50% between August 2005 and August 2006, and the Dow Jones U.S. Home Construction Index was down over 40% as of mid-August 2006.

CEO Robert Toll of Toll Brothers explained, "builders that built speculative homes are trying to move them by offering large incentives and discounts; and some buyers are canceling contracts for homes already being built". Homebuilder Kara Homes announced on 13 September 2006 the "two most profitable quarters in the history of our company", yet the company filed for bankruptcy protection less than one month later on 6 October. Six months later on 10 April 2007, Kara Homes sold unfinished developments, causing prospective buyers from the previous year to lose deposits, some of whom put down more than $100,000 (~$149,369 in 2025).

As the housing market began to soften from winter 2005 through summer 2006, NAR chief economist David Lereah predicted a "soft landing" for the market. However, based on unprecedented rises in inventory and a sharply slowing market throughout 2006, Leslie Appleton-Young, the chief economist of the California Association of Realtors, said that she was not comfortable with the mild term "soft landing" to describe what was actually happening in California's real estate market.

The Financial Times warned of the impact on the U.S. economy of the "hard edge" in the "soft landing" scenario, saying "A slowdown in these red-hot markets is inevitable. It may be gentle, but it is impossible to rule out a collapse of sentiment and of prices. ... If housing wealth stops rising ... the effect on the world's economy could be depressing indeed". "It would be difficult to characterize the position of home builders as other than in a hard landing", said Robert I. Toll, CEO of Toll Brothers.

Angelo Mozilo, CEO of Countrywide Financial, said "I've never seen a soft-landing in 53 years, so we have a ways to go before this levels out. I have to prepare the company for the worst that can happen." Following these reports, Lereah admitted that "he expects home prices to come down 5% nationally", and said that some cities in Florida and California could have "hard landings."

The World Bank lowered the global economic growth rate due to a housing slowdown in the United States, but it did not believe that the U.S. housing malaise would further spread to the rest of the world. The Fed chairman Benjamin Bernanke said in October 2006 that there was currently a "substantial correction" going on in the housing market and that the decline of residential housing construction was one of the "major drags that is causing the economy to slow"; he predicted that the correcting market would decrease U.S. economic growth by about one percent in the second half of 2006 and remain a drag on expansion into 2007.

National home sales and prices both fell dramatically again in March 2007 according to NAR data, with sales down 13% to 482,000 from the peak of 554,000 in March 2006 and the national median price falling nearly 6% to $217,000 from the peak of $230,200 in July 2006. The plunge in existing-home sales was the steepest since 1989. The new home market also suffered. The biggest year over year drop in median home prices since 1970 occurred in April 2007. Median prices for new homes fell 10.9 percent according to the U.S. Department of Commerce.

Others speculated on the negative impact of the retirement of the Baby Boom generation and the relative cost to rent on the declining housing market. In many parts of the United States, it was significantly cheaper to rent the same property than to purchase it; the national median mortgage payment is $1,687 per month, nearly twice the median rent payment of $868 per month.

=== Predictions of housing bubble bursting ===
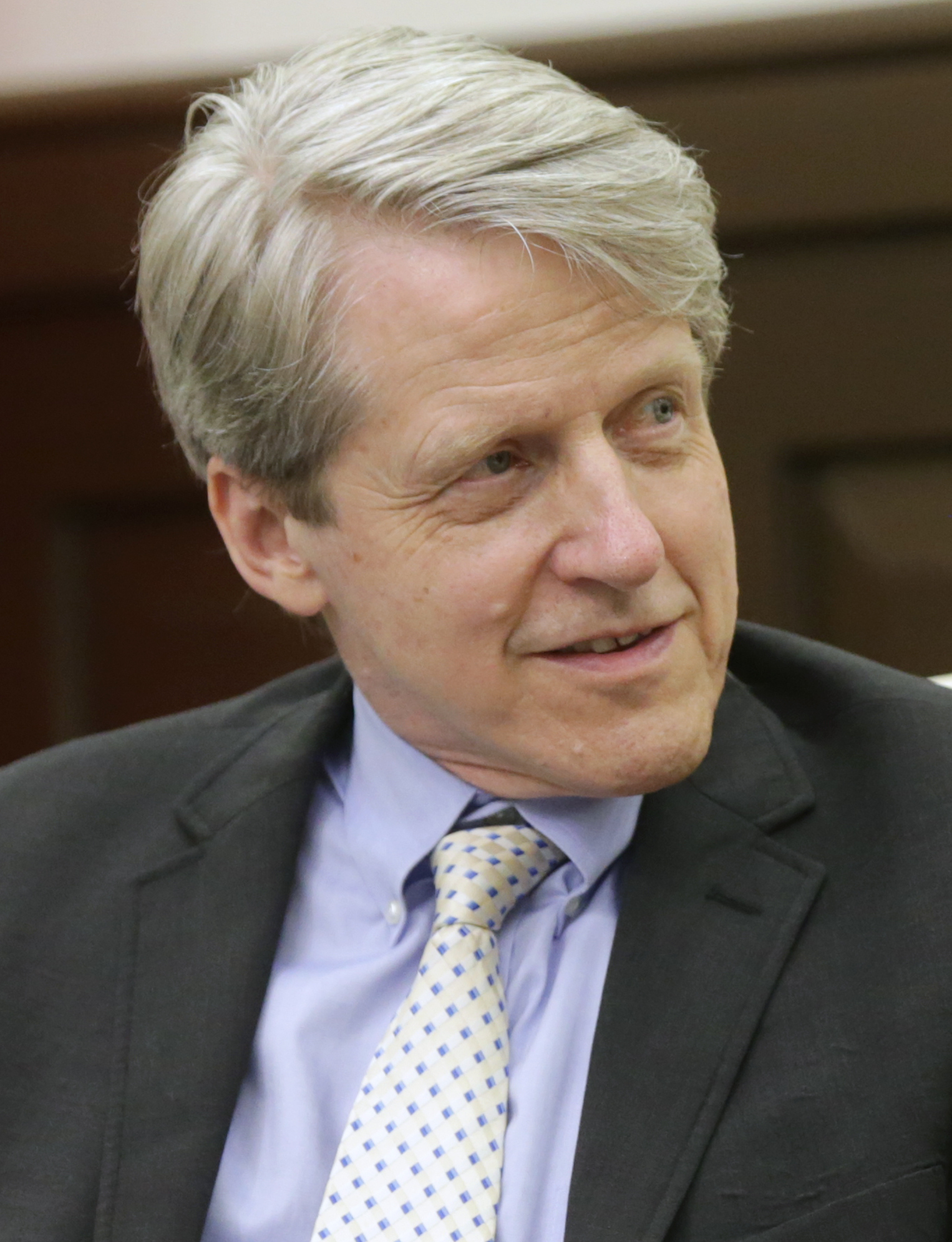
Robert Shiller

In 2005, economist Robert Shiller gave talks warning about a housing bubble to the Office of the Comptroller of the Currency and the Federal Deposit Insurance Corporation. He was ignored, and later called it an incidence of Groupthink. That same year, his second edition of Irrational Exuberance warned that the housing bubble might lead to a worldwide recession. Also in 2005, economist Fred Harrison commented: "The next property market tipping point is due at end of 2007 or early 2008... The only way prices can be brought back to affordable levels is a slump or recession." In January 2006, financial analyst Gary Shilling wrote an article entitled: "The Housing Bubble Will Probably Burst". In May 2006, JPMorgan's Christopher Flanagan, director of global structured finance research, warned clients of a coming housing downturn. In August 2006, economist Nouriel Roubini similarly warned that the housing sector was in "free fall" and would derail the rest of the economy, causing a recession in 2007. Joseph Stiglitz, winner of the 2001 Nobel Prize in Economics, also said that the U.S. might enter a recession as house prices declined.

== Major downturn and subprime mortgage collapse, 2007 ==
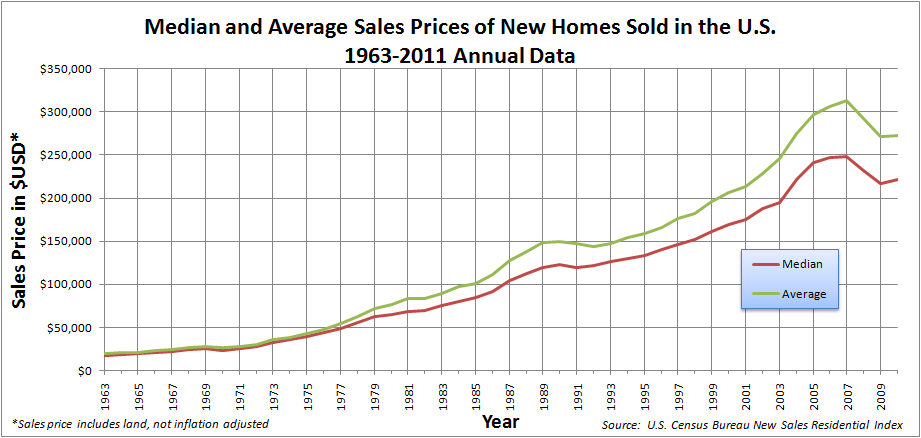
A graph showing the median and average sales prices of new homes sold in the United States between 1963 and 2008

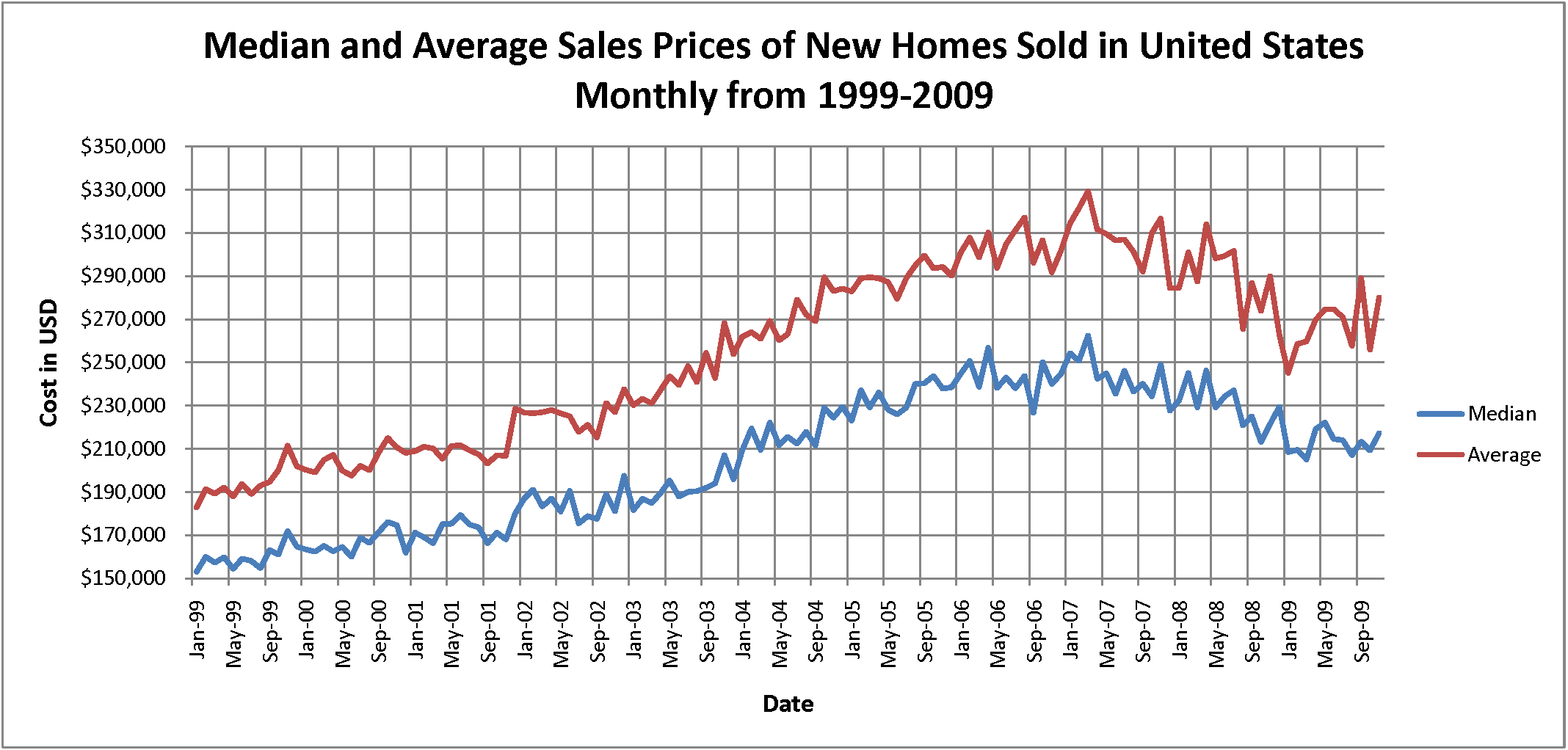
A graph showing the monthly median and average sales prices of new homes sold in the United States between 1999 and 2009

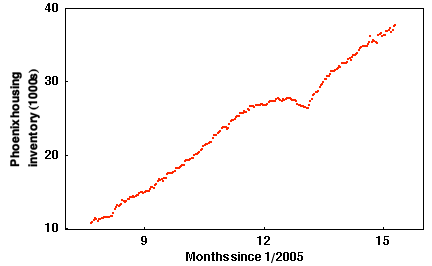
Inventory of houses for sale in Phoenix, AZ from July 2005 through March 2006. As of March 10, 2006, well over 14,000 (nearly half) of these for-sale homes were vacant. (Source: Arizona Regional Multiple Listing Service.)

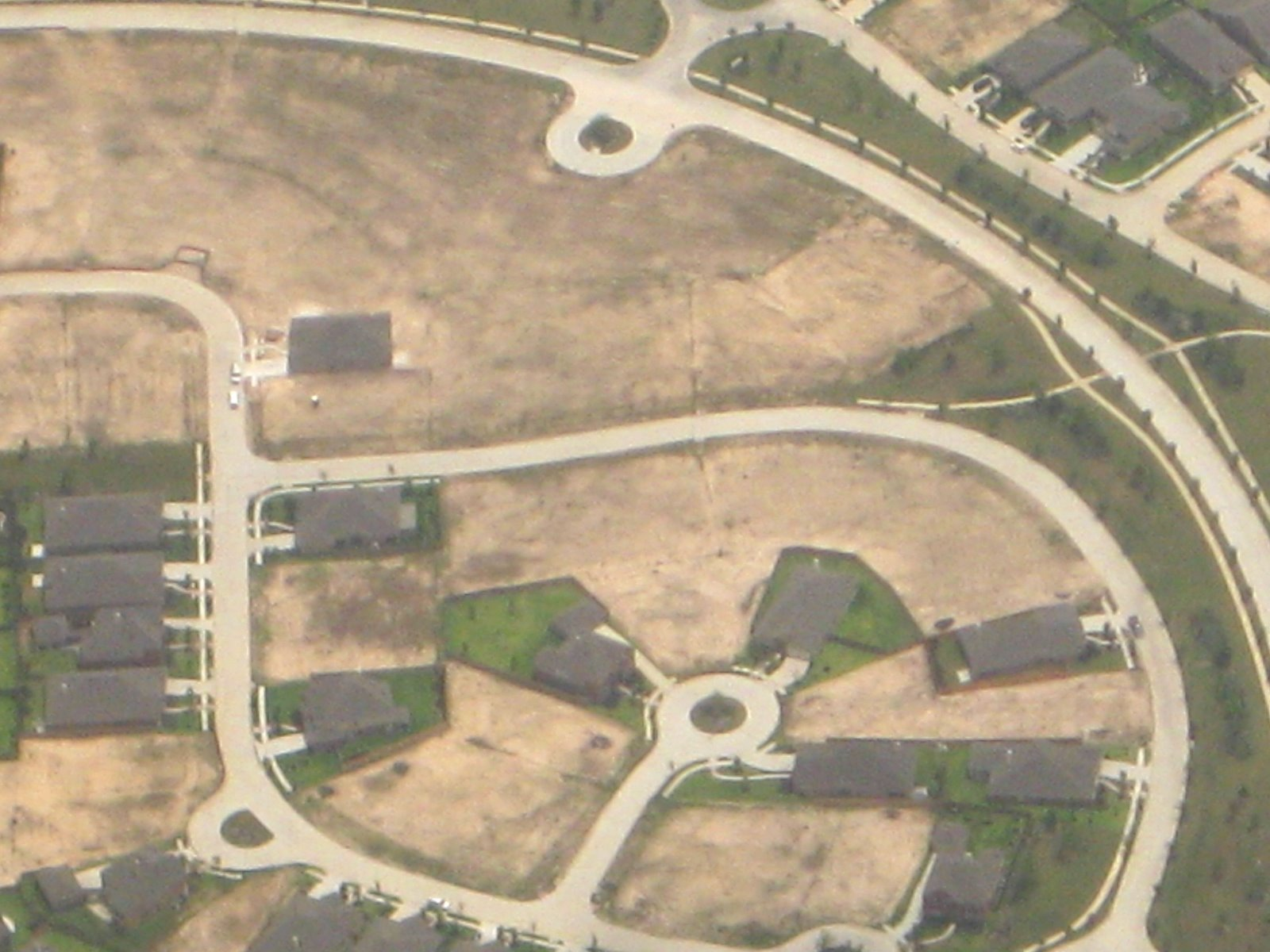
Incomplete housing development near Houston, Texas

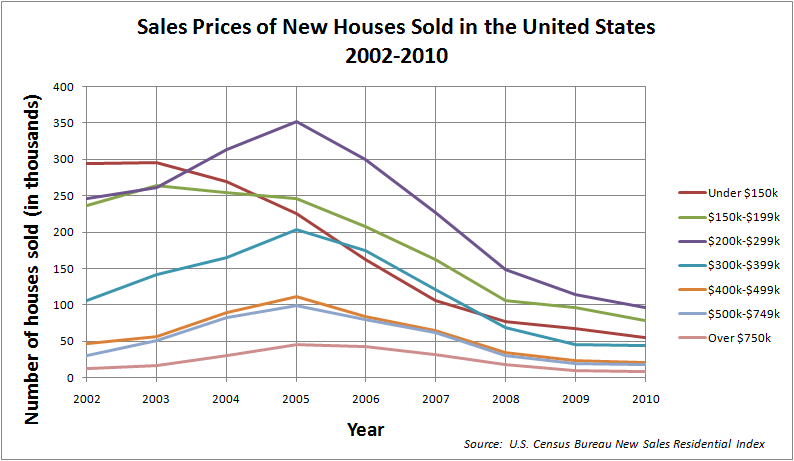
Sales prices of homes sold 2002–2010

The White House Council of Economic Advisers lowered its forecast for U.S. economic growth in 2008 from 3.1 per cent to 2.7 per cent and forecast higher unemployment, reflecting the turmoil in the credit and residential real-estate markets. The Bush administration economic advisers also revised their unemployment outlook and predicted the unemployment rate could rise slightly above 5 per cent, up from the prevailing unemployment rate of 4.6 per cent.

The appreciation of home values far exceeded the income growth of many of these homebuyers, pushing them to leverage themselves beyond their means. They borrowed even more money in order to purchase homes whose cost was much greater than their ability to meet their mortgage obligations. Many of these homebuyers took out adjustable-rate mortgages during the period of low interest rates in order to purchase the home of their dreams. Initially, they were able to meet their mortgage obligations thanks to the low "teaser" rates being charged in the early years of the mortgage.

As the Federal Reserve Bank applied its monetary contraction policy in 2005, many homeowners were stunned when their adjustable-rate mortgages began to reset to much higher rates in mid-2007 and their monthly payments jumped far above their ability to meet the monthly mortgage payments. Some homeowners began defaulting on their mortgages in mid-2007, and the cracks in the U.S. housing foundation became apparent.

=== Subprime mortgage industry collapse ===
In March 2007, the United States' subprime mortgage industry collapsed due to higher-than-expected home foreclosure rates, with more than 25 subprime lenders declaring bankruptcy, announcing significant losses, or putting themselves up for sale. The stock of the country's largest subprime lender, New Century Financial, plunged 84% amid Justice Department investigations, before ultimately filing for Chapter 11 bankruptcy on 2 April 2007 with liabilities exceeding $100 million (~$149 million in 2025).

The manager of the world's largest bond fund PIMCO, warned in June 2007 that the subprime mortgage crisis was not an isolated event and would eventually take a toll on the economy and impact the impaired prices of homes. Bill Gross, "a most reputable financial guru", sarcastically and ominously criticized the credit ratings of the mortgage-based CDOs now facing collapse:

AAA? You were wooed Mr. Moody's and Mr. Poor's, by the makeup, those six-inch hooker heels, and a "tramp stamp." Many of these good looking girls are not high-class assets worth 100 cents on the dollar. ... And sorry Ben, but derivatives are a two-edged sword. Yes, they diversify risk and direct it away from the banking system into the eventual hands of unknown buyers, but they multiply leverage like the Andromeda strain. When interest rates go up, the Petri dish turns from a benign experiment in financial engineering to a destructive virus because the cost of that leverage ultimately reduces the price of assets. Houses anyone? ... AAAs? [T]he point is that there are hundreds of billions of dollars of this toxic waste and whether or not they're in CDOs or Bear Stearns hedge funds matters only to the extent of the timing of the unwind. [T]he subprime crisis is not an isolated event and it won't be contained by a few days of headlines in The New York Times ... The flaw lies in the homes that were financed with cheap and in some cases gratuitous money in 2004, 2005, and 2006. Because while the Bear hedge funds are now primarily history, those millions and millions of homes are not. They're not going anywhere ... except for their mortgages that is. Mortgage payments are going up, up, and up ... and so are delinquencies and defaults. A recent research piece by Bank of America estimates that approximately $500 billion (~$747 billion in 2025) of adjustable rate mortgages are scheduled to reset skyward in 2007 by an average of over 200 basis points. 2008 holds even more surprises with nearly $700 billion ARMS subject to reset, nearly ¾ of which are subprimes ... This problem—aided and abetted by Wall Street—ultimately resides in America's heartland, with millions and millions of overpriced homes and asset-backed collateral with a different address—Main Street.

Financial analysts predicted that the subprime mortgage collapse would result in earnings reductions for large Wall Street investment banks trading in mortgage-backed securities, especially Bear Stearns, Lehman Brothers, Goldman Sachs, Merrill Lynch, and Morgan Stanley. The solvency of two troubled hedge funds managed by Bear Stearns was imperliled in June 2007 after Merrill Lynch sold off assets seized from the funds and three other banks closed out their positions with them. The Bear Stearns funds once had over $20 billion of assets, but lost billions of dollars on securities backed by subprime mortgages.

H&R Block reported a quarterly loss of $677 million on discontinued operations, which included subprime lender Option One, as well as writedowns, loss provisions on mortgage loans and the lower prices available for mortgages in the secondary market for mortgages. The units net asset value fell 21% to $1.1 billion (~$1.64 billion in 2025) as of April 30, 2007. The head of the mortgage industry consulting firm Wakefield Co. warned, "This is going to be a meltdown of unparalleled proportions. Billions will be lost." Bear Stearns pledged up to US$3.2 billion (~$4.78 billion in 2025) in loans on 22 June 2007 to bail out one of its hedge funds that was collapsing because of bad bets on subprime mortgages.

Peter Schiff, president of Euro Pacific Capital, argued that if the bonds in the Bear Stearns funds were auctioned on the open market, much weaker values would be plainly revealed. Schiff added, "This would force other hedge funds to similarly mark down the value of their holdings. Is it any wonder that Wall street is pulling out the stops to avoid such a catastrophe? ... Their true weakness will finally reveal the abyss into which the housing market is about to plummet."

A New York Times report connected the hedge fund crisis with lax lending standards: "The crisis this week from the near collapse of two hedge funds managed by Bear Stearns stems directly from the slumping housing market and the fallout from loose lending practices that showered money on people with weak, or subprime, credit, leaving many of them struggling to stay in their homes."

In the wake of the mortgage industry meltdown, Senator Chris Dodd, Chairman of the Banking Committee held hearings in March 2007 and asked executives from the top five subprime mortgage companies to testify and explain their lending practices. Dodd said, "Predatory lending practices endangered the home ownership for millions of people". Moreover, Democratic senators such as Senator Charles Schumer of New York were proposing a federal government bailout of subprime borrowers in order to save homeowners from losing their residences. Opponents of such proposal asserted that government bailout of subprime borrowers was not in the best interests of the U.S. economy because it would set a bad precedent, create a moral hazard, and worsen the speculation problem in the housing market.

Lou Ranieri of Salomon Brothers, inventor of the mortgage-backed securities market in the 1970s, warned of the future impact of mortgage defaults: "This is the leading edge of the storm. ... If you think this is bad, imagine what it's going to be like in the middle of the crisis." In his opinion, more than $100 billion of home loans are likely to default when the problems in the subprime industry appear in the prime mortgage markets. Fed Chairman Alan Greenspan praised the rise of the subprime mortgage industry and the tools used to assess credit-worthiness in an April 2005 speech:

Innovation has brought about a multitude of new products, such as subprime loans and niche credit programs for immigrants. Such developments are representative of the market responses that have driven the financial services industry throughout the history of our country ... With these advances in technology, lenders have taken advantage of credit-scoring models and other techniques for efficiently extending credit to a broader spectrum of consumers. ... Where once more-marginal applicants would simply have been denied credit, lenders are now able to quite efficiently judge the risk posed by individual applicants and to price that risk appropriately. These improvements have led to rapid growth in subprime mortgage lending; indeed, today subprime mortgages account for roughly 10 percent of the number of all mortgages outstanding, up from just 1 or 2 percent in the early 1990s.

Because of these remarks, along with his encouragement for the use of adjustable-rate mortgages, Greenspan was criticized for his role in the rise of the housing bubble and the subsequent problems in the mortgage industry.

== Alt-A mortgage problems ==
Subprime and Alt-A loans account for about 21 percent of loans outstanding and 39 percent of mortgages made in 2006.

In April 2007, financial problems similar to the subprime mortgages began to appear with Alt-A loans made to homeowners who were thought to be less risky. American Home Mortgage said that it would earn less and pay out a smaller dividend to its shareholders because it was being asked to buy back and write down the value of Alt-A loans made to borrowers with decent credit; causing company stocks to tumble 15.2 percent. The delinquency rate for Alt-A mortgages has been rising in 2007.

In June 2007, Standard & Poor's warned that U.S. homeowners with good credit are increasingly falling behind on mortgage payments, an indication that lenders have been offering higher risk loans outside the subprime market; they said that rising late payments and defaults on Alt-A mortgages made in 2006 are "disconcerting" and delinquent borrowers appear to be "finding it increasingly difficult to refinance" or catch up on their payments. Late payments of at least 90 days and defaults on 2006 Alt-A mortgages have increased to 4.21 percent, up from 1.59 percent for 2005 mortgages and 0.81 percent for 2004, indicating that "subprime carnage is now spreading to near prime mortgages".

== Foreclosure rates increase ==
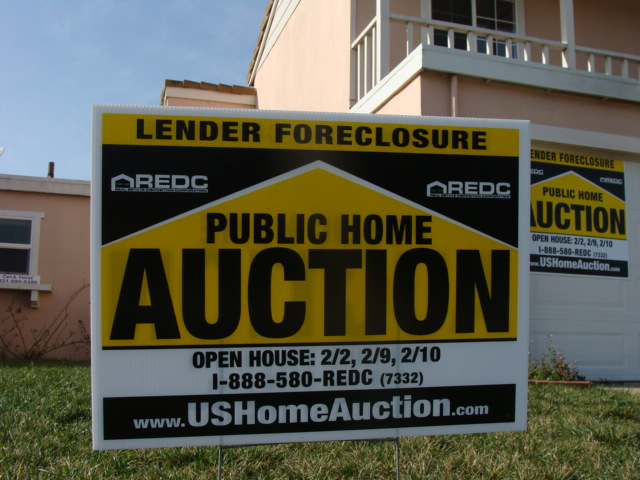
House in Salinas, California under foreclosure, following the bursting of the U.S. real estate bubble

The 30-year mortgage rates increased by more than a half a percentage point to 6.74 percent during May–June 2007, affecting borrowers with the best credit just as a crackdown in subprime lending standards limits the pool of qualified buyers. The national median home price is poised for its first annual decline since the Great Depression, and the NAR reported that supply of unsold homes is at a record 4.2 million.

Goldman Sachs and Bear Stearns, respectively the world's largest securities firm and largest underwriter of mortgage-backed securities in 2006, said in June 2007 that rising foreclosures reduced their earnings and the loss of billions from bad investments in the subprime market imperiled the solvency of several hedge funds. Mark Kiesel, executive vice president of a California-based Pacific Investment Management Co. said,

It's a blood bath. ... We're talking about a two- to three-year downturn that will take a whole host of characters with it, from job creation to consumer confidence. Eventually it will take the stock market and corporate profit.

According to Donald Burnette of Brightgreen Homeloans in Florida (one of the states hit hardest by the bursting housing bubble) the corresponding loss in equity from the drop in housing values caused new problems. "It is keeping even borrowers with good credit and solid resources from refinancing to much better terms. Even with tighter lending restrictions and the disappearance of subprime programs, there are many borrowers who would indeed qualify as "A" borrowers who can't refinance as they no longer have the equity in their homes that they had in 2005 or 2006. They will have to wait for the market to recover to refinance to the terms they deserve, and that could be years, or even a decade." It is foreseen, especially in California, that this recovery process could take until 2014 or later.

A 2012 report from the University of Michigan analyzed data from the Panel Study of Income Dynamics (PSID), which surveyed roughly 9,000 representative households in 2009 and 2011. The data seemed to indicate that, while conditions were still difficult, in some ways the crisis was easing: Over the period studied, the percentage of families behind on mortgage payments fell from 2.2 to 1.9; homeowners who thought it was "very likely or somewhat likely" that they would fall behind on payments fell from 6% to 4.6% of families. On the other hand, family's financial liquidity had decreased: "As of 2009, 18.5% of families had no liquid assets, and by 2011 this had grown to 23.4% of families."

== See also ==
- Great Recession
- Creative Real Estate Investing
- Deed in lieu of foreclosure
- Foreclosure consultant
- List of entities involved in 2007–2008 financial crises
- dot-com bubble

General:

- Real estate pricing
- Real estate appraisal
- Real estate economics
- Real estate trends

International property bubbles:

- Chinese property bubble (2005–2011)
- Affordability of housing in the United Kingdom
- Irish property bubble
- Japanese asset price bubble
- Spanish property bubble

== References and notes ==
Note: Sources that are blank here can be found here. This is a problem that is not yet fixed.
