= List of entities involved in 2007–2008 financial crises =

A list of companies, governmental and quasi-governmental agencies (government-sponsored enterprises), and/or non-profit organizations involved in the various economic and financial crises of 2007–2008.

== Housing Bubble ==
=== United States ===
==== National home construction companies ====
- Beazer Homes USA
- Hovnanian Enterprises
- Lennar
- KB Home
- NVR, Inc.
- PulteGroup
- Toll Brothers

==== Real estate and appraisal ====
- Coldwell Banker
- Prudential Financial

==== Associations ====
- American Society of Appraisers
- Appraisal Institute
- National Association of Home Builders
- National Association of Realtors
- Real Estate Counseling Group of America
- Urban Land Institute

== Mortgage crisis ==
=== Subprime lenders ===
- New Century Financial Corporation
- American Home Mortgage Investment Corporation
- Accredited Home Lenders
- Countrywide Financial
- Northern Rock (UK)
- Ameriquest
- E-Trade
- Option One
- American Freedom Mortgage, Inc.
- MortgageIT
- NovaStar Financial
- American Equity Mortgage

=== Other lenders ===
- Washington Mutual
- Wachovia
- Suntrust
- Luminent Mortgage Capital
- Aegis Wholesale
- 1st National Bank of Arizona
- GreenPoint Mortgage Funding
- Velocity Commercial Lender
- Fremont Investment & Loan
- ResMAE Mortgage Corp
- Americans Brokers Conduit
- IndyMac Bank
- Aurora Loan Services LLC

=== Insurers ===
- American International Group
- Ambac
- MBIA
- Mortgage Guaranty Insurance Corporation

== Secondary and securitized mortgage market ==
=== Banks ===
- BNP Paribas, France
- JPMorgan Chase, USA
- Citigroup, USA
- Deutsche Bank, Germany
- IKB Industriekredit-Bank, Germany
- Bear Stearns
- Sächsische Landesbank, Germany
- Goldman Sachs
- Lehman Brothers
- Bank of America
- Wachovia
- Netbank, USA
- UBS AG, Switzerland
- Northern Rock, United Kingdom
- HBOS, United Kingdom
- Merrill Lynch ., USA
- Washington Mutual Bank
- Dexia, Belgium, France
- Fortis, Benelux
- Royal Bank of Scotland Group, United Kingdom
- Lloyds Banking Group, United Kingdom
- Glitnir, Iceland
- Kaupthing Bank, Iceland
- Landsbanki, Iceland
- Anglo Irish Bank, Ireland

=== Governmental and quasi-governmental ===
- United States Department of the Treasury
- U.S. Securities and Exchange Commission
- Federal Housing Finance Agency
- State of California
- Jefferson County, Alabama
- Vallejo, California

==== Central Banks ====
- Federal Reserve Bank
  - Federal Reserve Bank of New York
- European Central Bank
- Bank of Japan
- Bank of England
- Central Bank of Russia

=== Credit rating agencies ===
- Moody's
- Standard & Poor's
- Fitch Ratings

==== Government sponsored enterprises ====
- Fannie Mae, Federal National Mortgage Association
- Freddie Mac, Federal Home Loan Mortgage Corporation

== Nonprofit Organization ==
=== Community Organization ===
- ACORN Association of Community Organizations for Reform Now: accused of involvement

=== Credit Counselors ===
- Hope Now Alliance

== United States officials' positions ==
Of the Emergency Economic Stabilization Act of 2008 and its reincarnation as an amendment of H.R. 1424, supporters and opponents:

=== Supporters ===
- Henry M. Paulson, Jr., Secretary of the Treasury
- Ben S. Bernanke, Chairman and a member of the Board of Governors of the Federal Reserve System
- George W. Bush, President
- John McCain, U.S. Senator, Arizona, 2008 Republican nominee for U.S. President
- Barack Obama, U.S. Senator, Illinois, 2008 Democratic nominee for U.S. President
- Joseph Biden, U.S. Senator, Delaware, 2008 Democratic nominee for U.S. Vice-president

=== Non-supporters ===
- Dr. Ron Paul, U.S. Congressman, Texas District 14, former candidate for Republican nomination for U.S. President
- Chuck Baldwin, 2008 presidential candidate for the Constitution Party
- Cynthia McKinney, 2008 presidential candidate for the Green Party
- Bob Barr, 2008 presidential candidate for the Libertarian Party
- Ralph Nader, 2008 independent presidential candidate
- Raghuram Rajan, 2005-06 Chief Economist, International Monetary Fund
