= Global financial crisis in October 2008 =

== Beginning of October ==
The policy response to the subprime crisis started in earnest after Lehman Brothers' failure in mid-September 2008, accelerated after February 2009, and had become very large by September 2009. Governments have relied on a portfolio of intervention tools, but the biggest commitments and outlays have been in the form of debt and asset guarantees, while purchases of bad assets have been very limited. Announcements directed at the banking system as a whole (general) and at specific banks (specific) were priced by the markets. General announcements tend to be associated with positive returns and specific announcements with negative ones. Moreover, general announcements exert cross-country spillovers but are perceived by the home-country banks as subsidies boosting the competitive advantage of foreign banks. Specific announcements exert spillovers on other banks.

The United States Senate's version of the $700 billion bailout plan, HR1424, modified to expand bank deposit guarantees to $250,000 and to include $100 billion in tax breaks for businesses and alternative energy, passed with bi-partisan support 74–25 on October 1. Reaction in the House was mixed, but in a vote on Friday the House of Representatives passed the Emergency Economic Stabilization Act of 2008, as refashioned by the Senate, 263–171 in a bipartisan vote.

Discussions were ongoing in Europe regarding possible remedies for financial instability in Europe leading up to a conference Saturday afternoon in Paris hosted by Nicolas Sarkozy, president of France. UniCredit of Italy was reported to be the latest bank to come under pressure. During the night of October 2 Greece followed Ireland's lead and guaranteed all bank deposits.

On October 3 it was reported that Wachovia had rejected the previous offer from Citigroup in favor of acquisition by Wells Fargo, resulting in a legal dispute with Citigroup.

In Britain, the Financial Services Authority announced on October 3 that effective Tuesday, October 7, the amount of the guarantee of bank deposits would be raised to £50,000 from £35,000. On Friday, October 3, the government of the Netherlands took over the Dutch operations of Fortis, replacing the bailout plan of September 28.

Over the weekend and on Monday a major banking and financial crisis emerged in Iceland with its currency the krona, dropping 30% against the euro. At a meeting on Monday night emergency legislation was passed granting broad powers to the government to seize and regulate banks. The Landsbanki and Glitnir were seized, while Kaupthing was subjected to a rescue plan.

On October 6, the Icelandic Financial Supervisory Authority decided temporarily to suspend from trading on regulated markets all financial instruments issued by Glitnir banki hf., Kaupþing banki hf., Landsbanki Íslands hf., Straumur-Burðarás fjárfestingarbanki hf., Spron hf., and Exista hf.

Before the opening of the business day, October 6, BNP Paribas, the French bank, assumed control of the remaining assets of Fortis following Dutch nationalization of the operations of the bank in The Netherlands. Denmark, Austria, and possibly Germany, joined Ireland and Greece in guaranteeing bank deposits on Monday, October 6. Following this, the FTSE100 index of leading British shares had its largest one-day points fall since it was established in 1984. A banking Bill easing rescues is slated for introduction in the British Parliament on Tuesday, October 7. On October 6, German chancellor Angela Merkel pledged that the government would guarantee all German private bank savings. The government also announced a revised bailout plan for German mortgage lender Hypo Real Estate (HRE). On Monday, October 6, the Dow Jones Industrial Average closed below 10,000, a drop of 30% from its high above 14,000 a year earlier on October 9, 2007. In Brazil and Russia trading was suspended on Monday following dramatic drops in their markets.

On October 7, the Icelandic Financial Supervisory Authority took control of Landsbanki. On the same day, the Central Bank of Iceland announced that Russia had agreed to provide a €4 billion loan, however this was soon denied by Russian authorities, and the Icelandic Finance Minister had to correct the earlier announcement and now stated that discussions had been initiated with Russia on providing a loan to Iceland. This was also denied by Russian Deputy Finance Minister Anton G. Siluanov. Late in the evening, however, Russia's Finance Minister Alexei Kudrin did concede that a request had been received, to which Russia was positive, and that discussions on financial matters would be conducted later in the week when an Icelandic delegation was expected to arrive in Moscow. Standard & Poor's also cut Iceland's foreign-currency sovereign credit rating from A-/A-2 to BBB/A-3 and local-currency sovereign credit rating from A+/A-1 to BBB+/A-2. S&P also lowered Iceland's banking industry country risk assessment from group 5 to group 8, worrying that "In a severe recession scenario, the cumulative amount of nonperforming and restructured loans could reach 35% to 50% of total outstanding loans in Iceland.

On October 7 the Federal reserve announced formation of a Commercial Paper Funding Facility (CPFF) which will serve as a funding backstop to facilitate the issuance of term commercial paper by eligible issuers. Several countries announced new or increased deposit guarantees: Taiwan outlined plans to double the guarantee to NT$3 million ($92,000) and the European Union agreed to increase guarantees across the EU to at least €50,000 per saver. Several EU states then announced increases on top of this minimum: Netherlands, Spain, Belgium, and Greece each announced they would guarantee up to €100,000.

The government of Britain announced on the morning of Wednesday, October 8 that it would make £25 billion available as "Tier 1 capital" (preference share capital or "PIBS" [Permanent Interest-Bearing Securities]) to the following financial institutions: Abbey, Barclays, HBOS, HSBC Bank plc, Lloyds TSB, Nationwide Building Society, Royal Bank of Scotland, and Standard Chartered as part of a bank rescue package. An additional £25 billion was scheduled to be made available to other financial institutions, including British subsidiaries of foreign banks. "In reviewing these applications the Government will give due regard to an institution's role in the UK banking system and the overall economy". The plan included increased ability to borrow from the government, offered assistance in raising equity, and a statement of support for international efforts. The plan has been described as partial nationalization. The crisis was very severe; according to the BBC's Robert Peston on 22 December after interviewing government and banking leaders "For me, what stood out when interviewing this quartet was the revelation about how Royal Bank of Scotland and HBOS were—in October—only hours away from being unable to open for business".

On Wednesday, October 8, the European Central Bank, Bank of England, Federal Reserve, Bank of Canada, Swedish Riksbank and Swiss National Bank all announced simultaneous cuts of 0.5% to their base rates at 11:00 UTC. Shortly afterwards, the Central Bank of the People's Republic of China also cut interest rates. On October 8 there were sharp losses on stock markets worldwide with a loss of over 9% in Japan. Trading was suspended in Russia and Indonesia after steep morning losses. In the United States, following the funds cut by the Federal Reserve, stocks were volatile, finishing down. On October 8 the Federal Reserve loaned AIG $37.8 billion, in addition to the previous loan of $85 billion.

On Wednesday night, October 8, the Central Bank of Iceland abandoned its attempt to peg the Icelandic króna at 131 króna to the euro after trying to set this peg on Monday, October 6. By Thursday October 9, the Icelandic króna was trading at 340 to the euro when the government suspended all trade in the currency.

On Thursday, October 9, the Icelandic Financial Supervisory Authority took control of the country's biggest bank Kaupþing banki hf. This occurred when the Kaupthing Board resigned and asked the national authorities to take control. This came about when "Britain transferred control of the business of Kaupthing Edge, its Internet bank, to ING Direct and put Kaupthing's UK operations into administration" placing Kaupthing in technical default according to loan agreements. This marked an escalating row between Iceland and the United Kingdom over the growing crisis. All trade was also suspended on the Iceland Stock Exchange until Monday October 13.

On Thursday, October 9, the one-year anniversary of the Dow's peak, the cost of short term credit rose while there were heavy losses in the United States stock market; the Dow dropped below 8600, reaching a five-year low. It was the first time since August 2003 that the Dow closed below 9000; losses were moderate in Europe. The following day, Friday, October 10, there were large losses in Asian and European markets Yamato Life filed for bankruptcy. Beset by falling commodities prices, Russia's stock markets remained closed on October 10. The Russian Parliament passed a plan authorizing lending of $36 billion gained from global oil sales to banks which met creditworthiness requirements. Special attention is being paid to shoring up Rosselkhozbank, the bank which provides credit to the reviving agricultural sector. The amount of funds available is limited due to falling oil prices. The government of the United States, as authorized by the Emergency Economic Stabilization Act, announced plans to infuse funds into banks by purchasing equity interests in them, in effect, partial nationalization, as done in Britain. The Treasury secretary Henry M. Paulson Jr. met Friday in Washington with world financial leaders. A meeting of international financial leaders hosted by President Bush at the White House in Washington is planned on Saturday to attempt to coordinate global response to the 2008 financial crisis. The annual meetings of both the International Monetary Fund and World Bank was scheduled to be held in Washington over that weekend.

On Friday, October 10, stock markets crashed across Europe and Asia. London, Paris and Frankfurt dropped 10% within an hour of trading and again when Wall Street opened for trading. Global markets have experienced their worst weeks since 1987 and some indices, S&P 500, since the Wall Street Crash of 1929.

On October 10, within the first five minutes of the trading session on Wall Street, the Dow Jones Industrial Average plunged 697 points, falling below 7900 to its lowest level since March 17, 2003. Later in the afternoon, the Dow made violent swings back and forth across the breakeven line, toppling as much as 600 points and rising 322 points. The Dow ended the day losing only 128 points, or 1.49%. Trading on New York Stock Exchange closed for the week with the Dow at 8,451, down 1,874 points, or 18% for the week, and after 8 days of losses, 40% down from its record high October 9, 2007. Trading on Friday was marked by extreme volatility with a steep loss in the first few minutes followed by a rise into positive territory, closing down at the end of the day. In S&P100 some financial corporate showing signals upwards also. President George W. Bush reassured investors that the government will solve the financial crisis gripping world economies.

The bonds of the bankrupt Lehman Brothers were auctioned on Friday, October 10. They sold for a little over 8 cents on the dollar. Many of the bonds of Lehman Brothers were insured with credit default swaps. Apprehension that payments to the holders of Lehman bonds might severely damage the firms or hedge funds which issued the swaps proved unfounded, despite anticipated claims estimated to be several hundred billion dollars, as countervailing claims canceled each other out resulting in only 5.2 billion dollars changing hands.

As meetings proceeded with global financial leaders in Washington on Saturday, October 11, the United States government announced a change in emphasis in its rescue efforts from buying illiquid assets to recapitalizing banks, including strong banks, in exchange for preferred equity; and purchase of mortgages by Fannie Mae and Freddie Mac. These remedies can be put into effect quicker than the prior plan which was estimated to take a month to set into operation.

== Week of October 12 ==
On Sunday the British government was in negotiations with Royal Bank of Scotland, HBOS, Lloyds TSB and Barclays, major British banks, regarding recapitalization which would give the British government a substantial equity interest. An investment of more than 37 billion pounds was contemplated. Some purchases would be common stock with existing shareholders given a right of first refusal (the government would only purchase the shares if existing shareholders did not). Previously announced recapitalization plans contemplated only purchases of preferred equity without government participation in governance of the banks, however, as the financial emergency has rapidly developed, more aggressive measures are being advanced. On Sunday, October 12, European leaders, meeting in Paris, led by France and Germany, announced recapitalization plans for Europe's banks. Plans were announced to guarantee bank deposits for five years. European countries would finance their own rescue plans and tailor them to local conditions. Mechanisms are also planned to increase the availability of short term credit. The total rescue plan totaled €1 trillion. Australia and New Zealand also announced bank guarantee plans. On Monday, October 13, the markets were closed in Japan and the bond market was closed in the United States.

On Sunday, in Norway, which is not in the euro zone, the Norwegian cabinet in a hastily called press conference announced a US$57.4 billion (350 billion Norwegian kroner) plan of offering Norwegian banks new government bonds. This came three days ahead of Wednesday's hastened interest rate meeting at Norges Bank to decide whether or not to announce rate cuts similar to the coordinated cuts of October 8. Central bank Governor Svein Gjedrem also made critical comments about some of the measures that had been implemented already by other countries, among them the concerted rate cuts which he said "was a strong card, which had a two-hour impact". He further commented that "It's important to be careful with measures – so that one addresses the problems one really faces," and he also emphasized that acting at the right time was important saying "there are unusually many examples that show one can do too much too early." He cited the Icelandic government's takeover of banks as an example of quick action with no guarantee that the problems would be solved.

The G7 nations, at their meeting in Washington over the weekend pledged to "support systemically important financial institutions and prevent their failure". This decision is based on analysis of the consequences of the bankruptcy of Lehman Brothers which resulted in the loss of funds by other financial institutions. It is thought that those losses may have triggered a tightening of the credit crunch as banks ceased to lend to one another. No enforceable mechanism was created to support the pledge, but it is believed to extend to major firms such as Morgan Stanley and Goldman Sachs.

On October 13 stock markets worldwide rose with the Dow Jones industrial average showing a 400-point leap at the start of trading. At the close of trading the average was up 936.42 points, a record climb, up 11.08%, closing above 9,000 at 9,387.61. After announcement in France of a 320 billion euro rescue and guarantee plan, French CAC40 rose by 11.18% within the day. Germany announced a €400 billion plan. On Monday the International Monetary Fund offered possible technical and financial aid to Hungary which has suffered during the crisis due to the flight of investors to euro, Swiss franc, and dollar denominated investments. As in the rest of the world, on Monday stock prices rose on the Hungarian exchange and pressure on the national currency, the forint eased. The forint has dropped 30% against the dollar since July. The prime minister of Spain, Jose Luis Rodriguez Zapatero, announced that Spain would provide up to €100 billion of guarantees for new debt issued by commercial banks in 2008. This plan followed a meeting at the eurozone summit over the weekend to try to develop a coordinated effort to combat the credit crisis. The UK government started the nationalization process by injecting £37 billion in the nation's three largest banks. The UK government would end up owning a majority share in the Royal Bank of Scotland (RBS) and over a 40% share in Lloyds and HBOS. In return for the bailout, the banks agreed to cancel dividend payments until the loans are repaid, have board members appointed by the Treasury, and limit executive pay. The European Central Bank attempted to revive credit market by weekly injections of unlimited euro funds at an interest rate of 3.75%. The ECB president, Jean-Claude Trichet, was also contemplating relaxing the collateral standards to make the funds more accessible to banks. Following its European partners, Italy pledged to intervene as necessary to prevent any bank failures in its country. Finance minister, Giulio Tremonti, said Italy would guarantee new bank bonds of up to 5 years until the end of 2009 and the Bank of Italy would provide €40 billion in treasury bills to banks to refinance inferior assets that can not be currently used as collateral. In coordination with other eurozone countries, the Dutch government announced that it would guarantee interbank lending up to €200 billion. This followed the set up of a €20 billion Dutch fund to help recapitalize banks and insurers.

On Tuesday the United States announced a plan to take an equity interest of $250 billion in US banks with 25 billion going to each of the four largest banks. The 9 largest banks in the US: Goldman Sachs, Morgan Stanley, J.P. Morgan, Bank of America, Merrill Lynch, Citigroup, Wells Fargo, Bank of New York Mellon and State Street were called into a meeting on Monday morning and pressured to sign; all eventually agreed. The plan will be open to any bank for 30 days. The equity interests purchased by the government are preferred shares that pay 5% but rise to 9% after 5 years; it is expected that the companies will repurchase this interest when they can raise private capital to do so. The plan also includes an option allowing the government to purchase common stock according to a formula which could return substantial profit to the taxpayers should the stock price of the companies substantially appreciate. The total liability assumed is $2.25 trillion including a $1.5 trillion guarantee of new senior debt issued by banks and a $500 billion guarantee of deposits in noninterest-bearing accounts (business accounts used to pay current obligations such as payroll). The theory is that with additional capitalization and the guarantees, banks will be willing to resume a normal lending pattern with each other and borrowers.

Also on that day, United Arab Emirates’ (UAE) ministry of finance added a $19 billion liquidity injection to domestic banks bringing the total dollars injected to $32.7 billion. The UAE central bank offered 13.6 billion in liquidity to help domestic banks in September. To protect local deposits, the UAE government guaranteed all deposits and interbank lending. Japan announced a plan that will help steady the Japanese market and avoid the worse of the credit crisis. Among the measures included are lifting restrictions on companies buying back their shares, strengthening disclosure on short selling, and the temporary suspension of the sale of government-owned stocks. The Australian government unveiled a $10.4 billion stimulus package. The Economic Security Strategy is designed to help pensioners, low and middle income families, and first time home buyers withstand the credit crisis and global economic slowdown. This followed the Australian government announcing that it would guarantee all bank deposits for three years, guarantee all term wholesaling funding by Australian banks in international markets and double its planned purchase of residential mortgage backed securities. The Icelandic stock exchange began trading again after a three-day shutdown. The opening did not include Iceland's three largest banks which were nationalized last week.

On Wednesday, October 15, the London stock exchange FTSE 100 fell substantially, surrendering 314 points to slip down 7.16 percent. The losses precipitated more losses in the U.S., as the Dow Jones Industrial Average suffered its largest drop in terms of percentage since 1987, falling 733 points. The NASDAQ plunged almost eight and a half percent, and the Standard & Poor collapsed down over nine percent.

On October 16, a rescue plan was announced for the Swiss banks UBS and Credit Suisse. Recapitalization involved Swiss government funds, private investors, and the sovereign wealth fund of Qatar. A Swiss agency was set up to purchase and workout toxic funds. UBS had suffered substantial withdrawals by domestic Swiss depositors but still reported profits; Credit Suisse has reported losses. Most large banks in the United States continued to report large losses.

== Week of October 19 ==
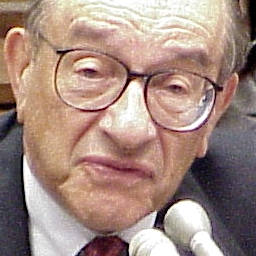
During testimony before the US Committee of Government Oversight and Reform, Alan Greenspan remarked that the crisis is "a once-in-a-century credit tsunami"

Following a conference at Camp David over the weekend of October 18 and 19th attended by President Nicolas Sarkozy of France and José Manuel Barroso, President of the European Commission, President George W. Bush announced on Wednesday, October 22 that he would host an international conference of financial leaders on November 15 in Washington, D.C. Participants would be drawn from both the developed world and the developing world, including participants from the G20 industrial nations such as India, Brazil and China.

On Sunday, October 19 the government of the Netherlands bailed out ING, the Dutch bank, with a €10 billion capital rescue plan. On Monday the government of Belgium rescued the insurance company Ethias with a €1.5 billion capital injection. In Germany BayernLB has decided to apply for funds from the German €500 billion rescue program. Sweden announced formation of a 1.5 trillion kronor fund to support inter-bank lending and a 15 billion kronor capital injection plan. Swedish banks were reported to be increasingly affected by the 2008 financial crisis. An IMF rescue plan for Iceland was reported to be near finalization while Ukraine was reported to be in discussions with the IMF. Iceland was reported to have also received assistance from Denmark and Norway while Britain has offered a loan to support compensation of British depositors in failed Icelandic bank Landsbanki. On Monday France announced a €10.5 billion rescue plan for six of its largest banks, including Crédit Agricole, BNP and Société Générale.

Despite some improvement in the availability of credit, stock markets and weak currencies such as the British pound and the euro continued to decline worldwide during the week of October 19. Markets across Asia suffered particularly heavy losses while European markets experienced substantial losses too, but to a lesser extent compared to those in Asia. The Dow Industrials Index, on the other hand, experienced a week of extreme volatility with violent swings both upwards and downwards, eventually ending lower. The yen and the dollar showed particular strength with the yen rising with respect to the dollar. This "flight to quality" had baleful effects on the economies of all nations including the United States and Japan. On Wednesday, Pakistan joined Iceland, Hungary, Serbia and Ukraine and requested aid from the International Monetary Fund in dealing with severe balance of payments difficulties. Hungary, Russia, Ukraine, Pakistan, Turkey, South Africa, Argentina, Iceland, Estonia, Latvia, Lithuania, Romania and Bulgaria were all experiencing financial difficulties with others threatened. These countries did not hold securities based on subprime mortgages, but were affected by inability to borrow money, the credit crisis. Plans are under discussion to increase credit available to the IMF, perhaps to a trillion dollars.

On Friday, October 24, stock markets plummeted worldwide amidst growing fears among investors that a deep global recession is imminent if not already settled in. The panic was partly fueled by remarks made by Alan Greenspan that the crisis is "a once-in-a-century credit tsunami" and by comments made by Gordon Brown during a speech, admitting essentially that Great Britain is already in recession mode. Following the trend, the US stock markets also fell sharply on opening and ended with the Dow Industrial Index down 312 points. Friday and Saturday (October 24 and 25) the 7th Asia-Europe Meeting was held in Beijing with the European Union meeting Asian states in an attempt to discuss a common approach ahead of the Emergency International Meeting that is scheduled to take place in Washington on November 15. No specific recommendations to solve the crisis were developed.

== Week of October 26 ==
On Sunday, October 26, Hungary and Ukraine made tentative arrangements with the International Monetary Fund for emergency aid packages. In Poland the value of stocks has fallen 50% for the year and the zloty, the Polish currency, has fallen against both the dollar and the euro. The crisis has affected South Africa, Brazil and Turkey. South Africa was particularly affected by a dramatic drop in the price of platinum, a commodity used in automobile manufacturing. In addition to Iceland, Ukraine and Hungary, Belarus and Pakistan were also engaged in emergency discussions with the IMF. Pakistan had what was described as a "growing balance of payments crisis". In the Gulf states, impacted by the falling price of oil and a drop in equities prices of 40% for the year, the Gulf Cooperation Council met in Riyadh on Saturday to discuss a coordinated response to the crisis.

On Monday, October 27, Hong Kong stocks crashed, losing more than 12% of their value while in Japan, the Nikkei 225 Index plummeted by 6.4% to its lowest level since 1982. European stock markets showed mixed results. After suffering an initial drop, the Dow Jones Industrial Average was in slightly positive territory for much of the trading day but eventually closed down 203 points. Oil futures continued to decline and the yen continued to rise against all other currencies. There was consideration given by both the G7 and the Japanese government to take measures to support other currencies as against the yen.

In a second round of recapitalization, the U.S. Treasury funded 22 banks with 38 billion dollars. The list of banks aided was confidential, but some banks including BB&T, Capital One, SunTrust Banks, City National Corporation, Comerica, First Niagara Bank, Huntington Bancshares, Northern Trust, State Street Corporation, UCBH Holdings, First Horizon National Corporation, PNC Financial Services (buyer of the National City Corporation), Regions Financial Corporation, Valley National Bancorp KeyBank, and Washington Federal Savings said they would receive government money. Fifth Third Bank announced that they would apply. Criteria for funding was based on the strength of the bank with stronger banks with higher CAMELS ratings having a greater chance of being offered aid. The American Bankers Association stated that due to restrictions on salaries and payment of dividends that some U.S. banks may not participate. Another concern was that acceptance of the recapitalization plan might give a false signal that a bank was troubled. (A TARP oversight report by GAO, published December 2008, listed a total of 44 banks participating in the Treasury's $250bn (~$357 billion in 2024) "Capital Purchase Program" initiative.

On Tuesday, October 28, stocks rose dramatically worldwide in anticipation of rate cuts by central banks. In the U.S. the Dow Industrial Average rose 10.88%, closing at over 9,000. On Wednesday, October 29, markets in the U.S. closed down slightly despite announcement by the Federal Open Market Committee of a reduction in the federal funds rate 50 points to 1 percent Markets in the U.S. were up Thursday and Friday, closing up for the week, cutting losses to the Dow Industrial Average during October to 17%, down 30% for the year.

In Russia, the $50 billion rescue program administered by the state development bank Vnesheconombank (VEB) is assisting Russian firms controlled by Russian oligarchs who gave ownership of portions of their companies as security for loans from Western financial institutions. Recipients include Oleg Deripaska of Rusal owner of Norilsk Nickel and Mikhail Fridman of Alfa Group whose assets VimpelCom and TNK-BP were threatened. Stock markets in Russian have crashed, down 70% and there is lack of faith in its currency the ruble. Despite significant foreign reserves from the sale of oil, Russia is now faced with sharply reduced commodities prices.

In Asia, Japan announced its second economic stimulus plan of $51 billion on Thursday, October 30. Hong Kong and Taiwan cut interest rates while an interest cut to .3% was announced by the Bank of Japan on Friday. Also on Thursday the Federal Reserve established a $30 billion currency swap line with South Korea and Singapore as well as Brazil and Mexico.

JPMorgan Chase, the largest bank in the United States, announced that it would work with homeowners who demonstrate a willingness to pay their mortgages by reducing interest payments or principal. Counseling centers are planned for troubled areas. Washington Mutual, and EMC Mortgage Corporation, a loan servicing company, acquired by JPMorgan, will be included. Bank of America has announced a similar program, as has Countrywide Financial as the result of a court settlement.

== See also ==
- Global financial crisis in September 2008
- Global financial crisis in November 2008
- Global financial crisis in December 2008
- Global financial crisis in 2009
- Subprime crisis impact timeline
- Timeline of the United States housing bubble for the pre-subprime crisis timeline
