= Global financial crisis in November 2008 =

== Week of November 2 ==
=== Reports of economic activity ===
October sales of cars and light trucks in the United States fell precipitously in 2008 when compared with sales in October 2007, with General Motors falling 45%, Ford falling 30%, Chrysler falling 35%, Toyota falling 23%, Honda falling 25%, and Nissan falling 33%. Much of the falloff in sales was attributable to customers being unable to arrange financing. Except for Wal-Mart, which posted a slight gain, retail sales were off during October 2008 as compared with October 2007 in the United States with some moderate priced stores reporting double digit decreases. October retail sales were down 4.1% from October 2007 and down 2.8% from September 2008 with sales of cars and auto parts leading the way with a 23.4% decline from October 2007, and a 31.9% decline from September 2008.

Employment reports released by the Labor Department on Friday, November 7, showed that about 500,000 jobs were lost in the United States during September and October 2008 with unemployment rising to 6.5% at the end of October. The September figure was revised to 284,000 from the initial 159,000 reported. The initial October figure was 240,000. This is a substantial acceleration from the average 75,000 jobs lost each month since the beginning of 2008. It is anticipated by experts that unemployment will rise to 8% by the middle of 2009.

In the UK car sales fell by 23% in October, following a 21% decline in September.

=== Events ===
Amid predictions of a "deep recession" in the UK and the Eurozone, on Thursday, November 6, the Bank of England, citing a reduced danger of inflation due to falling commodities prices, lowered its base rate by 1.5 percentage points, from 4.5% to 3%. This was accompanied by a 50 basis point drop in the base rate to 3.25% by the European Central Bank (ECB).

On November 6, the International Monetary Fund (IMF) at Washington, D.C., predicted for 2009 a worldwide −0.3% decrease of the BIP for the developed economies (−0.7% for the US and −0.8% for Germany).

== Week of November 9 ==
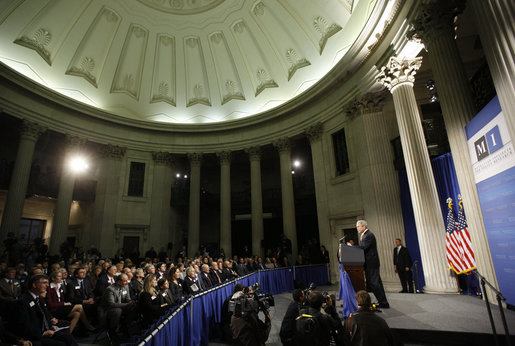
George W. Bush addressing a Manhattan Institute-sponsored event at Federal Hall National Memorial on November 13, 2008, speaking against too much government involvement in resolving the crisis.

On Sunday, November 9, the People's Republic of China announced a $586 billion domestic stimulus package for the remainder of 2008, 2009, and 2010. Economic growth has slowed in China with sharp drops in property and stock values. The money from the stimulus package will be spent on upgrading infrastructure, particularly roads, railways, airports and the power grids throughout the country and raise rural incomes via land reform. Also spending will be made on social welfare projects such as affordable housing and environmental protection. Some Chinese factories engaged in low-end export manufacturing have gone out of business.

On Monday, November 10, the US Treasury announced investment of 40 billion dollars in preferred stock of AIG, adjusting the terms of the existing credit line and its amount. Total exposure, including equity and debt, is now 150 billion dollars. Funds were drawn from the Troubled Asset Relief Program which was not available at the time of the original bailout of AIG. The question of whether emergency funding would be made available to the troubled American auto industry remained under consideration. General Motors is the most threatened with a sharp drop in sales and diminishing cash reserves.

On Wednesday, November 12, US Treasury Secretary Henry Paulson scrapped the original Troubled Asset Relief Program (TARP) and announced shift in the focus to consumer lending. The remaining portion of the TARP budget will be used to help relieve pressure on consumer credits such as car loans, student loans, credit cards etc.

On Thursday November 13, the Dow Jones Industrial Average marked another dramatic session, with the index (opening at 8,282.66) that after a mixed start tumbled again below the 8,000 mark (to a low of 7,965.42) but then reversed the trend and gained more than 900 points (fourth largest daily swing ever) in less than three hours closing at 8,835.25 with a net gain of more than 550 points (third largest ever).

The prospect of a federal bailout of failing US automakers appeared dim pending the inauguration of Barack Obama. There appeared to be opposition from both the Republican members of the Senate and the office of the incumbent president, George W. Bush, which expressed doubt that the companies could be salvaged.

At the invitation of US President George W. Bush the leaders of the G-20 held the initial session of the Summit on Financial Markets and the World Economy on Saturday, November 15, in Washington, D.C. They agreed to cooperate with respect to the global financial crisis and issued a statement regarding immediate and medium term goals and actions considered necessary to support and reform the international economy. The next session will be held April 30, probably in London, after Barack Obama takes office as President of the United States. The initial session, attended by the leaders of the G-20 set forth a road map of proposed reforms which will be followed up in coming months by the development of specific proposals, including a comprehensive reform of the Bretton Woods Institutions.

== Week of November 16 ==
=== Reports of economic activity ===
In the third quarter of 2008 the gross domestic product of Japan fell 0.4% following a 3.7% drop in the second quarter. Similar reports of recession level economic activity had been released previously by Hong Kong, Germany and the European Union.

It was widely anticipated that economic activity in the United States would be found to be at recession levels when statistics were released. As of November 20 new applications for unemployment benefits rose to a seasonally adjusted 542,000 per week; new applications averaged over 500,000 a week for the last four weeks.

=== Events ===
On Wednesday, November 19, proposed federal bailouts of US auto makers failed with Republican senators rejecting the Democratic plan and Democratic senators rejecting the Republican plan. Negotiations continued with the Democrats requesting a plan for viability from the automakers. Automobile sales were also down sharply in Europe and bailouts were under consideration, particularly for subsidiaries of General Motors such as Opel in Germany and Vauxhall in the United Kingdom.

On Wednesday, November 19, the Dow Jones Industrial Average fell sharply by 427.47 points or 5.07%, closing below 8,000 points for the first time since March 2003. United States financial stocks led the way with Citigroup showing a 23% drop. The UK FTSE100 fell by about the same percentage, closing just above 4000. The BBC Global 30, combining Europe, Asia and North America in a single index, fell by 5.1%.

On Thursday, November 20 the Dow Jones Industrial Average dropped 445 points in the last minutes of the trading session, closing at 7,552, the lowest point in six years. Shares in Citigroup plummeted another 26%, and shares of other major US financial institutions dropped by more than 10%.

On Friday, November 21 the Dow Jones Industrial Average recovered about half of the loss for the week and closed above 8,000; however, stocks of Citibank, Bank of America, and J.P. Morgan Chase continued to decline. It was unclear whether the drop in the value of Citigroup stock to under $4 reflected financial weakness of the bank or what rescue plan could be crafted. One theory for the disappointment of investors was that the failure of the Treasury to purchase toxic mortgage related securities held by the bank left billions of unrealized losses on the books. Citigroup continues to hold $20 billion in mortgage-related securities, currently valued at a substantial discount.

As of the week of November 16 stock losses in United States markets during 2008 as measured by the S&P 500 were equivalent to those suffered in 1931, over 50%. Total losses during the Great Depression exceeded 80% but that was over a three-year period.

== Week of November 23 ==
Late on Sunday, November 23, a rescue plan for Citigroup was agreed by the United States government. In a joint statement by the United States Treasury Department, the Federal Reserve and the Federal Deposit Insurance Corporation it was announced that in exchange for preferred stock valued at $27 billion paying 8% interest, a further $20 billion would be invested into the company and that the government would limit loss on $306 billion in risky loans and securities to 29 billion dollars plus 10% of any remaining losses. According to the joint statement, "With these transactions, the U.S. government is taking the actions necessary to strengthen the financial system and protect U.S. taxpayers and the U.S. economy."

Friday, November 21 and Monday, November 24 marked the Dow Jones Industrial Average's largest two-session gain since October 1987. The Dow gained 891.10 points, 11.8%, bringing it to a close at 8,443.39 points.

== See also ==
- Global financial crisis in September 2008
- Global financial crisis in October 2008
- Global financial crisis in December 2008
- Global financial crisis in 2009
- Subprime crisis impact timeline
- Timeline of the 2000s United States housing bubble, for the pre-subprime crisis timeline
