= Global financial crisis in 2009 =

Analysts and investors criticized the merger of Commerzbank and Dresdner Bank amid the ongoing global economic and financial crisis. The transaction significantly affected the stock prices of all involved companies. Due to the credit risks of Dresdner Bank that became apparent at the end of 2008, Commerzbank utilized the Special Fund for Financial Market Stabilization (SoFFin). After the German federal government and the European Commission agreed on the assistance details, Commerzbank received a silent participation of 8.2 billion euros in early December 2008. Initially, Commerzbank emphasized that the state's participation was necessary due to the devaluation of banks and not specifically because of the takeover of Dresdner Bank. This assessment had to be revised. Commerzbank on 8 January 2009 sought additional state aid, leading to the Federal Republic of Germany under Chancellor Angela Merkel acquiring over 25 percent of Commerzbank's shares, thereby securing a blocking minority. This was the first partial nationalization of a German financial institution. The silent participation of SoFFin increased to around 16.4 billion euros.

On the evening of January 18, the Danish Parliament agreed to a financial package worth 100 billion Danish kroner (17.6 billion USD). In response, markets panicked yet again. On January 22, the editorial board of The Christian Science Monitor wrote that the four largest U.S. banks "have lost half of their value since January 2."

The two-month period from January 1-February 27 represented the worst start to a year in the history of the S&P 500 with a drop in value of 18.62%. By March 2, the Dow Jones Industrial Average Index had dropped more than 50% from its October 2007 peak. The decline has been compared to that of the 1929 Great Depression, which was 53% between September 1929 and March 1931.

On March 6, the Bank of England announced up to 150 billion pounds of quantitative easing, increasing the risk of inflation.

In March 2009, Blackstone Group CEO Stephen Schwarzman said that up to 45% of global wealth had been destroyed by the global financial crisis.

By March 9, 2009, the Dow had fallen to 6,500, a percentage decline exceeding the pace of the market's fall during the Great Depression and a level which the index had last seen in 1997. On March 10, 2009, a countertrend growing market rally began despite an overall long-term downtrend, taking the Dow up to 8,500 by May 6, 2009. Financial stocks were up more than 150% during this rally. By May 9, financial stocks had rallied more than 150% in just over two months.

On June 22 the World Bank projected that the global production for 2009 would fall by 2.9%, the first decline since the second world war.

== See also ==
- Global financial crisis in September 2008
- Global financial crisis in October 2008
- Global financial crisis in November 2008
- Global financial crisis in December 2008
- Subprime crisis impact timeline
- Timeline of the United States housing bubble for the pre-subprime crisis timeline
