= Global financial crisis in December 2008 =

== Reports of economic activity ==
On December 1, the National Bureau of Economic Research officially declared that the U.S. economy had entered recession in December 2007, a full year earlier. (See late 2000s recession)

On December 5, the Labor Department said that the US lost 533,000 jobs in November 2008, the biggest monthly loss since 1974. This raised the unemployment rate from 6.5% to 6.7%.

On December 9, the Bank of Canada lowered its key interest rate by 0.75% to 1.5%, the lowest it had been since 1958; at the same time the Bank officially announced that Canada's economy was in recession. This move came after the news that Canada lost 70,600 jobs in the month of November, the most since 1982. The official Bank of Canada press release stated that "[the] outlook for the world economy has deteriorated significantly and the global recession will be broader and deeper than previously anticipated."

On December 11, the FBI announced the arrest of Bernard Madoff in a Ponzi scheme which totaled $50 billion by Madoff's own estimate, and which was soon found to affect banks, individuals, and charities in the U.S. and Europe.

== Events ==
After 5 positive days, on December 1 the S&P 500 fell 80.03 points to 816.21, down 8.93%. Financial stocks in the S&P 500 fell 17%. The Dow Jones Industrial Average closed at 8,149.09 with a drop of 679.95 points (7.70%). Oil fell below $50 a barrel in New York Trading. The General Accounting Office released a report that claims that the Oversight of the Troubled Assets Relief Program requires additional actions to ensure "integrity, accountability, and transparency". (Washington Post) (bloomberg.com) (Wall Street Journal) (CNN Money)

On December 22, US industry leaders asked the Federal Reserve for assistance un-freezing the commercial real estate market, which has not securitized any loans in the last six months of 2008.

== See also ==
- Global financial crisis in September 2008
- Global financial crisis in October 2008
- Global financial crisis in November 2008
- Global financial crisis in 2009
- Subprime crisis impact timeline
- Timeline of the United States housing bubble for the pre-subprime crisis timeline
