= Doug Naidus =

American businessman (born 1965)

Doug Naidus (born December 30, 1965) is an American businessman who is the founder and chief executive officer of World Business Lenders, LLC.

== Career in finance ==
Naidus founded IPI Skyscraper, a mortgage brokerage company, in 1988. Under his leadership, IPI Skyscraper transformed from a start-up to one of the largest mortgage brokers in the United States. In 1999, Naidus founded MortgageIT, a nationwide real estate investment trust and residential mortgage lending company, where he served as chairman and chief executive officer. The company, which funded $33 billion in residential mortgage loans, was listed publicly on the New York Stock Exchange in 2004 before being acquired by Deutsche Bank in 2007.

== Deutsche Bank ==
Naidus held the position of managing director and Global Head of Residential Lending and Trading at Deutsche Bank from 2007 to 2011.

== World Business Lenders ==
In 2011, Naidus founded and currently serves as chairman and chief executive officer of World Business Lenders, which has been described as a predatory lender.

== Banned Brokers ==
In a Bloomberg article published on May 27, 2014, Naidus refused to comment when asked about predatory lending practices at World Business Lenders. See https://www.fa-mag.com/news/what-some-of-wall-street-s-banned-brokers-are-doing-now-18091.html?print.
