= Correspondent lender =

A correspondent lender originates, and unlike a mortgage broker, underwrites, and funds mortgage loan using their own funds. The initial loan is usually made in the name of the correspondent lender, and then after closing, the loan is either sold to a larger primary lender or on the secondary mortgage market.

Many smaller credit unions make home loans as correspondents, selling the loan once the mortgage is complete. Some banks act like as correspondents, making mortgages in their own name, but later selling those notes to a larger institution. Correspondent lenders may, in some cases, continue to service the loan, keeping the loan in their name, while collecting a fee from the primary lender who now holds the note.

Correspondent lenders usually underwrite their loans according to the guidelines of the larger lender, allowing for the loan to be sold quickly.
