= World Business Lenders =

World Business Lenders, LLC is an American financial company headquartered in Jersey City, New Jersey with locations in Georgia, California, Connecticut, Florida and Texas. It is a bank service provider and a private direct lender specializing in short-term loans to small and medium-sized businesses. It has been described as a predatory lender.

== History ==
World Business Lenders was founded in 2011 in Manhattan. In 2016, the company moved its headquarters to Jersey City, New Jersey. Doug Naidus, the founder, Chairman, and CEO, is a former Deutsche Bank Managing Director and Global Head of Residential Lending and Trade. The firm has been described as a predatory lender.

== Operations ==
World Business Lenders originates and services short-term business loans, secured by real property, targeting U.S. Small and Medium Enterprise (“SME”) companies that agree to a daily or weekly repayment program. Bloomberg News described the company's business model as making sales calls to "truckers, contractors and florists across the country." loans with interest rates starting at 13% percent.

== Controversies ==
World Business Lenders has been criticized for charging interest rates that exceed caps on usury.
