= A-paper =

In the mortgage industry of the United States, A-paper is a term to describe a mortgage loan (or a Prime loan) for which the asset and borrower meet the following criteria:

- In the United States, the borrower has a credit score of 680 or higher
- The borrower fully documents their income and assets
- The borrower's debt to income ratio does not exceed 35%
- The borrower retains 2 months of mortgage payments in reserves after closing
- The borrower injects at least 20% equity

Furthermore, there are some criteria that are guiding factors, such as the borrower having stability in the line of work and/or living in the same property for two or more years.

== See also ==
- Alt-A paper
- Subprime lending
