= Alt-A =

Type of U.S. mortgage

An Alt-A mortgage, short for Alternative A-paper, is a type of U.S. mortgage that, for various reasons, is considered riskier than A-paper, or "prime", and less risky than "subprime," the riskiest category. For these reasons, as well as in some cases their size, Alt-A loans are not eligible for purchase by Fannie Mae or Freddie Mac. Alt-A interest rates, which are determined by credit risk, therefore tend to be between those of prime and subprime home loans, although there is no single accepted definition of Alt-A. Typically Alt-A mortgages are characterized by borrowers with less than full documentation, average credit scores, higher loan-to-values, and more investment properties and secondary homes. A-minus is related to Alt-A, with some lenders categorizing them the same, but A-minus is traditionally defined as mortgage borrowers with a FICO score of below 680 while Alt-A is traditionally defined as loans lacking full documentation. Alt-A mortgages may have excellent credit but may not meet underwriting criteria for other reasons. During the past decade, a significant amount of Alt-A mortgages resulted from refinancings, rather than property purchases.

Alt-A loans should not be confused with alternative documentation loans, which are typically considered to have the same risk as full documentation loans despite the use of different documents to verify the relevant information. As with subprime mortgages, a greater portion of Alt-A mortgages tend to be originated by specialized lenders, rather than banks and thrifts.

== Characteristics of Alt-A ==
Within the U.S. mortgage industry, different mortgage products are generally defined by how they differ from the types of "conforming" or "agency" mortgages, ones guaranteed by the Government-Sponsored Enterprises (GSEs) Fannie Mae and Freddie Mac.

There are numerous factors that might cause a mortgage not to qualify under the GSEs' traditional lending guidelines even though the borrower's creditworthiness is generally strong. A few of the more important factors are:

- Reduced borrower income and asset documentation (for example, "stated income", "stated assets", "no income verification")
- Borrower debt-to-income ratios above what Fannie or Freddie will allow for the borrower credit, assets and type of property being financed
- Credit history with too many problems to qualify for an "agency" loan, but not so many as to require a subprime loan (for example, low FICO score or serious delinquencies, but no recent charge-offs or bankruptcy)
- Loan to value ratios (percentage of the property price being borrowed) above agency limits for the property, occupancy or borrower characteristics involved

In this way, Alt-A loans are "alternatives" to the standard of conforming, GSE-backed mortgages.

== Borrower considerations ==
An example of a person requesting a Stated Income mortgage is an individual with multiple and varying sources of income that would require an onerous amount of paperwork to document, such as income from self-employment or investments. Note that reduced documentation loans still require that borrowers authorize the lender to order their tax returns at random from the Internal Revenue Service in order to verify the income on the application.

The same documentation features are available under "subprime" guidelines, and similar ones may even be available under agency guidelines. Alt-A and subprime differ in that, generally speaking, an Alt-A borrower would have had a sufficient financial profile to qualify for a "conforming" mortgage, if only it weren't for one of the factors mentioned above, whereas a subprime borrower would suffer from exceptionally weak credit, income or asset characteristics. However, in cases where borrower, property and loan characteristics meet agency guidelines especially well, Fannie's and Freddie's automated preapproval systems generally grant reduced documentation features automatically at no extra cost. More expensive Alt-A or subprime loans are not necessary for strong borrowers to expedite their applications.

Aside from reduced documentation features, Alt-A guidelines usually also offer borrowers greater flexibility than agency guidelines concerning borrower credit scores, income and asset levels. Thus a borrower whose financial profile might not meet agency guidelines for the loan terms requested might still be eligible under Alt-A guidelines.

== Property and occupancy considerations ==
Aside from the borrower's credit and financial profile, GSE standards are also generally the most stringent regarding how much of a given property type's value or purchase price is permissible to lend on owner-occupied, second ("vacation") and non-owner occupied ("investment") homes, and under what conditions. The combination of these property and occupancy factors with a given borrower's profile can move the loan out of the "prime" category of agency-conforming loans and into less stringent categories such as Alt-A and subprime. For example, Fannie Mae might agree to purchase all loans made by a particular lender on single family second homes in a particular area at a particular maximum LTV for borrowers within given income, asset and credit limits. Borrowers beyond those limits, or those seeking loans above that maximum LTV for second homes, would need to apply for an Alt-A loan. Borrowers still further outside the income, asset and credit limits might need to consider subprime financing—difficult to find as of 2008.

Similar to Alt-A lending, the jumbo and super-jumbo categories generally use an amalgam of agency and Alt-A guidelines for borrower eligibility while allowing larger maximum loan amounts than those permitted by the GSEs (as of 2023, $726,200 for a single family home outside Alaska, Hawaii, Guam and the US Virgin Islands).

== Revaluation of risk ==
During the subprime mortgage crisis that began in 2007, Alt-A mortgages came under particular scrutiny.

One problem associated with Alt-A loans is the lack of necessary proof or documentation needed to be approved for a loan. Thus, lenders may be inclined to suggest borrowers skew their incomes or assets in order to qualify for a larger loan; in the long run, the borrowers may turn out to be unable to afford their payments but the lenders still collect a hefty profit. Because Alt-A loans are also the financing of choice for most non-owner occupied, investment properties, as a class they represent a far greater likelihood of borrower default than conventional, conforming mortgages, since people are more likely to abandon a property in which they do not live than they are to risk losing their primary homes. As of 2008, there was strong evidence of weakness among securities backed by Alt-A mortgages for reasons similar to the crisis in those backed by subprime.

Because Alt-A loans were not primarily purchased by the GSEs, they thus became more expensive and much harder to find as a result of the general crisis in markets for mortgage-backed securities. Alt-A loans were still available from individual institutions which held them "in portfolio" rather than re-selling them to investors, and as of mid-2008, there was a strong push for the FNMA and FHLMC to be permitted to buy more of them. However, the interest rates in this lending category increased substantially between 2006 and 2008 as a result of the shrinking secondary market.

== See also ==
- A-paper
- Subprime lending
