= Foreclosure consultant =

Although the definition may vary by jurisdiction, foreclosure consultant generally means any person who makes any solicitation, representation, or offer to any owner to perform for compensation or who, for compensation, performs any service which the person in any manner represents will in any manner do any of the following:

1. Stop or postpone the foreclosure sale.
2. Obtain any forbearance from any beneficiary or mortgagee.
3. Assist the owner to exercise the right of reinstatement.
4. Obtain any extension of the period within which the owner may reinstate his or her obligation.
5. Obtain any waiver of an acceleration clause contained in any promissory note or contract secured by a deed of trust or mortgage on a residence in foreclosure or contained in any such deed of trust or mortgage.
6. Assist the owner to obtain a loan or advance of funds.
7. Avoid or ameliorate the impairment of the owner's credit resulting from the recording of a notice of default or the conduct of a foreclosure sale.
8. Save the owner's residence from foreclosure.

In some jurisdictions a foreclosure consultant must be licensed by the government.

== See also ==
- Deed in lieu of foreclosure
