= MortgageIT =

MortgageIT formerly MIT Lending is a residential mortgage banking company that was founded in 1988 and is headquartered in New York City. By 2004, the company had become one of the top mortgage lenders in the nation. Also, in 2004, MortgageIT became a wholly owned subsidiary of MortgageIT Holdings, a self-administered REIT trading on the NYSE. As a full-service residential mortgage banking company, MortgageIT’s primary business operations are to originate, sell and broker residential mortgage loans in 50 states and the District of Columbia. Also, MortgageIT is an approved U.S. Department of Housing and Urban Development (HUD) delegated mortgagee. At the end of January 3, 2007 the company employed 2,100 and had 47 branches throughout the United States. The settlement, title and related services for mortgage loans were provided by Home Closer LLC, a subsidiary of MortgageIT.

== Business segments ==
There are two primary operation spaces that drive the revenues for the company and they are mortgage investment and mortgage banking operations. The company’s mortgage investment operations are defined as the net interest income generated on the company’s prime mortgage loan investment portfolio. As for the mortgage banking operations, this part of the company’s income is generated from the mortgage loan origination business and include sales, loan process, underwriting, funding, secondary marketing and brokerage activities.

== IPO offerings ==
The close of MortgageIT’s IPO on August 4, 2004 sold 14.6 million shares of common stock at $12.00 per share. The net proceeds of the IPO were approximately 163.4 million. In June 2005, MortgageIT sold 7,289,428 shares of its common stock in a secondary public offering.

== Acquisition ==
On June 11, 2006, the company agreed to be acquired by Deutsche Bank Structured Products, for $14.75 in cash per share of the company common stock. On January 3, 2007, the acquisition was completed and expected to add to Deutsche Bank’s US residential mortgage business.

== Executives ==
Chief Executive Officer and Chairman - Doug Naidus
Chief Financial Officer and President - Glenn J. Mouridy
