= Hope Now Alliance =

Cooperative effort to assist homeowners with paying mortgages

The Hope Now Alliance is a cooperative effort between the US government, counselors, investors, and lenders to help homeowners who may not be able to pay their mortgages. Created in 2007 in response to the subprime mortgage crisis, the alliance claims to have helped over 1 million homeowners avoid foreclosure through January 2008. Critics of the alliance contend that the assistance provided does not go far enough, and that not enough homeowners are being helped.

== Creation ==
On August 31, 2007 President George W. Bush asked Housing and Urban Development Secretary Alphonso Jackson and Treasury Secretary Henry Paulson to work with mortgage lenders, foreclosure counsellors, the Federal Housing Administration, Fannie Mae and Freddie Mac to launch a new "foreclosure avoidance initiative". These discussions led to the creation of the Hope Now alliance, which was announced by Secretary Paulson on October 10, 2007.

At its inception the Alliance was composed of lenders representing 60% of all outstanding mortgages in the United States, counseling services, trade organizations and a group representing investors in mortgage backed securities. Additional organizations joined over the following months.

== Strategy ==
The group promotes a national 24-hour toll-free telephone number (known as the Homeowner's HOPE Hotline), through which the Homeownership Preservation Foundation (a member) offers free counseling to homeowners concerned about foreclosure. It also encourages homeowners in difficulty to contact their lender directly, and provides on its website a list of contact for member organizations.

Beginning in October 2007 mortgage lenders & servicing companies within the group reached out to homeowners with past due accounts via mail, giving information to them of the group and the assistance available. Over 200,000 letters were sent in the first batch, with additional mailings occurring in November, January & February 2008. In total one million letters have been sent.

== Relief options ==
Hope Now describes the assistance that it provides to homeowners as loan workouts, a form of loss mitigation. These workouts can either result in establishing a modified repayment plan with the homeowner to bring them up to date, or a loan modification where the terms of the mortgage are modified in order to make the loan serviceable for the homeowner.

== Results ==
Since first being mentioned in December 2007, the Homeowner's HOPE Hotline received more than 140,000 calls in 2007 (including over 45,000 in the first three days), and an average of 3,200 calls per day in January 2008

There are claims that the group has not been effective at addressing the increasing problem of foreclosures in the United States, with recent figures indicating that the rate of foreclosures rising faster than the increase in homeowners helped. It has also been noted that the majority of assistance provided by the group has been to establish repayment plans, rather than actually modifying the terms of the mortgage. Concerns about the limitations of data collected by groups such as Hope Now led the Office of the Comptroller of the Currency to undertake its own investigation into foreclosures.

== Membership ==
A current list of Hope Now members is available here

== See also ==
- Subprime mortgage crisis
