= American Home Mortgage =

Retail mortgage lender in the United States

American Home Mortgage Investment Corporation
- Industry: Finance
- Founded: 1987; 39 years ago
- Defunct: 2007; 19 years ago
- Headquarters: Melville, New York, U.S.
- Key people: Michael Strauss (CEO & president)
- Products: Financial services; Investment management
- Revenue: ▲US$1.026 billion (2006)
- Net income: ▲US$263.5 million (2006)
- Number of employees: 7,409 (Dec. 2006)
- Website: americanhm.com Archived June 2, 2004, at the Wayback Machine

American Home Mortgage Investment Corporation was the 10th largest retail mortgage lender in the United States and was structured as a real estate investment trust (REIT).

In 2007, it filed for bankruptcy and was liquidated. The company was focused on earning net interest income from self-originated loans and mortgage-backed securities, and through its taxable subsidiaries, from originating and servicing mortgage loans for institutional investors.

Mortgages were originated through the company's employees as well as through mortgage brokers and purchased from correspondent lenders and were serviced at the company's servicing center in Irving, Texas.

The company filed for Chapter 11 bankruptcy protection in Wilmington Delaware federal court, on August 6, 2007. The week before the filing, the company said that many of its lenders had demanded their money back, and that AHM was also unable to deliver on about US$800 million in commitments for housing loans, and had laid off nearly ninety percent of its 7,000 employees.

== History ==
Founded in 1987 in New York City, the company became a publicly traded on NASDAQ in September 1999. The company moved its corporate headquarters to Melville, New York, on Long Island, in 2000.

Since its beginning as American Home Mortgage Holdings, Inc., it was engaged only in the origination and servicing of mortgages. Following its acquisition of Apex Mortgage Capital in December 2003, the Company became a REIT and changed its name to American Home Mortgage Investment Corp., the new parent company of American Home Mortgage and moved from NASDAQ to NYSE. The company has made numerous acquisitions since 1999 including Marina Mortgage of Irvine, CA, First Home Mortgage of Mt Prospect, IL, Columbia National of Columbia, MD, and retail branches from Principal Residential Mortgage, Waterfield Financial, Irwin Mortgage, and 86 Washington Mutual offices.

On July 31, 2007, the company announced that it can no longer fund home loans and may liquidate assets, putting its survival in doubt. The Melville, New York-based real estate investment trust retained Milestone Advisors and Lazard to help it evaluate options and advise "with respect to the sourcing of additional liquidity including the orderly liquidation of its assets." American Home's announcement shows how concerns about credit quality and homeowner defaults have spread beyond subprime lenders, which lend to people with weaker credit, to lenders that make higher-quality loans. This announcement caused its stock price to plunge 90% that day to $1.04 on the NYSE. "The chances are pretty high that the company either goes bankrupt or materially restructures, leaving little value for shareholders," said Bose George, an analyst at Keefe, Bruyette & Woods Inc. in New York. American Home has specialized in prime and near-prime loans. It has, however, made many loans that allow borrowers to produce little documentation of income or assets. It recently commanded about 2.5 percent of the U.S. mortgage market.

== Financial difficulties ==
On August 2, 2007, Michael Strauss sent an email to the entire company announcing company's serious financial difficulties.

It is with great sadness I announce today that American Home Mortgage has been forced to close. Unfortunately, the market conditions in both the secondary mortgage market as well as the national real estate market have deteriorated to the point that our business is no longer viable. What this means for most of our employees is that Friday, August 3, 2007 will be your last day of employment. Detailed information regarding payroll, benefits and other human resource related matter will be available Friday morning for distribution in the office. I would like to personally thank every single individual working for the company for their efforts. It has been my privilege to be associated with such a wonderful team.

Following Strauss's email, at least one employee of AHM has stated that the western division of AHM had been purchased by IndyMac Bank, saving those employees' jobs. In 2008, IndyMac also failed—one of the largest bank failures in American history. On July 11, 2008, IndyMac Bank was placed into conservatorship by the FDIC and on August 6, 2008, the bank filed for Chapter 11 bankruptcy protection. American Home Mortgage Servicing Inc. was sold to Wilbur Ross & Co. LLC, as part of the bankruptcy liquidation, in November 2007. The entity was formed by affiliates of WL Ross & Co. LLC in November 2007 for the purpose of acquiring the servicing assets of American Home Mortgage Investment Corp., American Home Mortgage Corp. and American Home Mortgage Servicing Inc. in the bankruptcy liquidation. American Home Mortgage Servicing Inc. changed its name to Homeward Residential Holdings, Inc. in February 2012. In October 2012, Ocwen announced plans to buy Homeward Residential Holdings, Inc. from WL Ross & Co. for $750 million. The acquisition was finalized on Dec. 27, 2012.

== WARN Act Class Action Lawsuit ==
On August 8, 2007, Outten & Golden LLP filed suit against American Home Mortgage Corp, American Home Mortgage Acceptance, Inc., American Home Mortgage Servicing Inc., American Home Mortgage Investment Corp., and American Home Mortgage Holding, Inc. seeking to recover 60 days wages and benefits for former employees of American Home Mortgage who they contended were terminated on or about August 3, 2007 in violation of the Worker Adjustment and Retraining Notification Act. (the WARN Act). On December 14, 2009, the court approved a final settlement valued at $6.5 million for the former employees of American Home Mortgage. As of May 5, 2013, no monies had been distributed as "The Trustee continues to work to resolve claims and pending litigation which will impact the timing of distributions to AHM creditors, including the WARN Class".Source
The warn act settlement was distributed in 2014.
