= Secondary mortgage market =

Market for the sale of securities or bonds collateralized by the value of mortgage loans

The secondary mortgage market is the market for the sale of securities or bonds collateralized by the value of mortgage loans. A mortgage lender, commercial bank, or specialized firm will group together many loans (from the "primary mortgage market") and sell grouped loans known as collateralized mortgage obligations (CMOs) or mortgage-backed securities (MBS) to investors such as pension funds, insurance companies and hedge funds. Mortgage-backed securities were often combined into collateralized debt obligations (CDOs), which may include other types of debt obligations such as corporate loans.

The secondary mortgage market was intended to provide a new source of capital for the market when the traditional source in one market—such as a Savings and loan association (S&L) or "thrift" in the United States—was unable to. It also was hoped to be more efficient than the old localized market for funds which might have a shortage or surplus depending on the location. In theory, the risk of default on individual loans was greatly reduced by this aggregation process, such that even high-risk individual loans could be treated as part of an AAA-risk (safest possible) investment.

On the other hand, mortgage securitization undid "the connection between borrowers and lenders", such that mortgage originators no longer had a direct incentive to make sure the borrower could pay the loan. While historically in the US, fewer than 2% of people lost their homes to foreclosure; rates were far higher during the Subprime mortgage crisis. Delinquencies, defaults, and decreased real estate values could make CDOs difficult to evaluate. This happened to BNP Paribas in August, 2007, causing the central banks to intervene with liquidity.

== See also ==
- Real estate investment trust
- Asset-backed security
- Commercial bank
