= Timeline of the 2000s United States housing bubble =

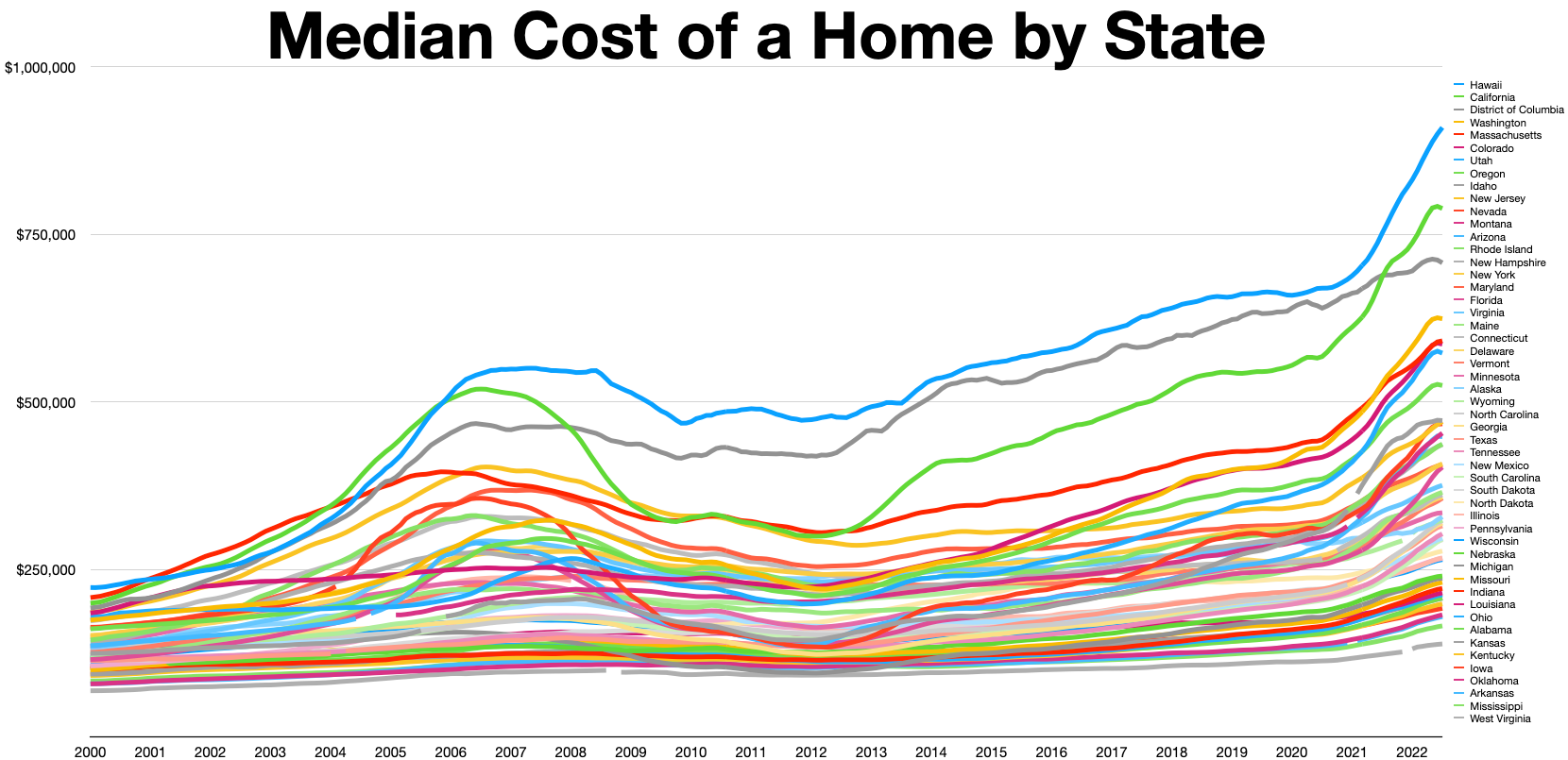
Cost of housing by State

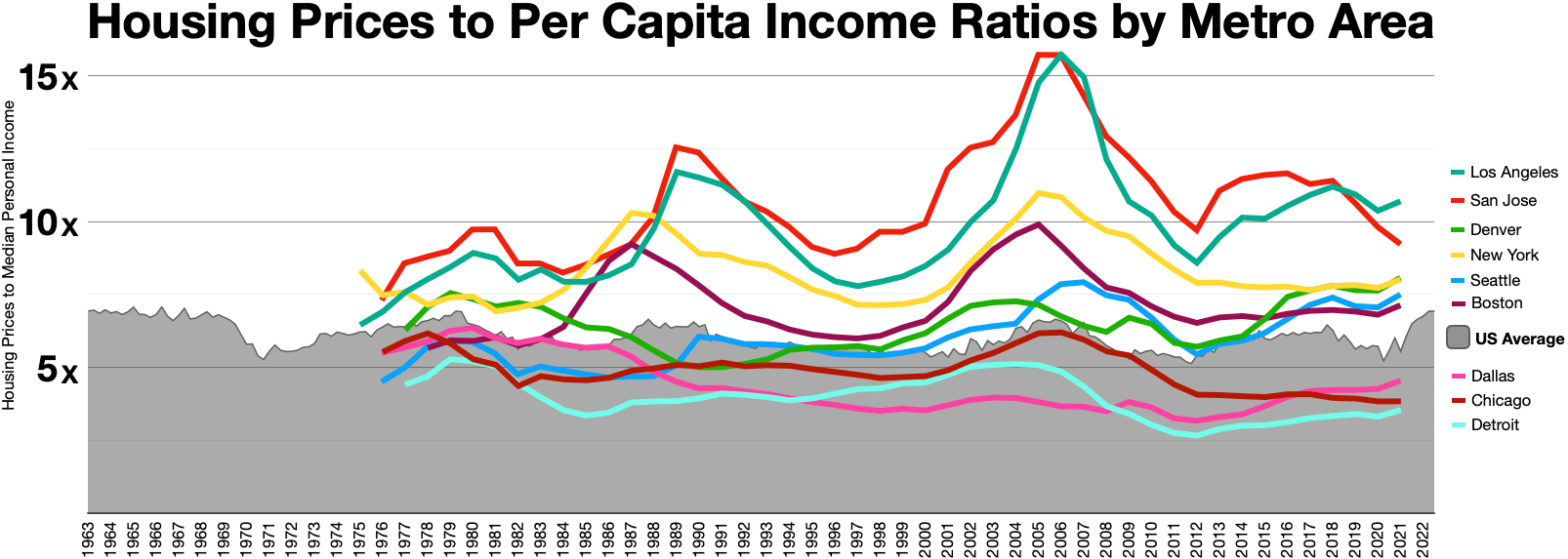
Housing prices to personal income ratios by metro area Los Angeles San Jose Denver New York Seattle Boston United States average Dallas Chicago Detroit

A graph showing the median and average sales prices of new homes sold in the United States between 1963 and 2016.

Housing prices peaked in early 2005, began declining in 2006 (see also United States housing market correction).

== 1930s ==
- 1933-1939 The New Deal is a group of new laws created to fix problems in the Great Depression economy, including methods to increase home ownership for Americans .
- 1934 The National Housing Act of 1934, part of the New Deal, makes more affordable housing and home mortgages. It creates the Federal Housing Administration (FHA) (later United States Department of Housing and Urban Development, HUD) and the Federal Savings and Loan Insurance Corporation.
- 1938 Fannie Mae is founded by the government under the New Deal. It is a stockholder-owned corporation that purchases and securitizes mortgages in order to ensure that funds are consistently available to the institutions that lend money to home buyers.

== 1968–1991 ==
- 1968: As part of the Housing and Urban Development Act of 1968, the Government mortgage-related agency, Federal National Mortgage Association (Fannie Mae) is converted from a federal government entity to a stand-alone government sponsored enterprise (GSE) which purchases and securitizes mortgages to facilitate liquidity in the primary mortgage market. The move takes the debt of Fannie Mae off of the books of the government.
- 1970 Federal Home Loan Mortgage Corporation (Freddie Mac) is chartered by an act of Congress, as a GSE, to buy mortgages on the secondary market, pool them, and sell them as mortgage-backed securities to investors on the open market. The average cost of a new home in 1970 is $26,600 ($167,817 in 2017 dollars). From 1960 to 1970, inflation rose from 1.4% to 6.5% (a 5.1% increase), while the consumer price index (CPI) rose from about 85 points in 1960 to about 120 points in 1970, but the median price of a house nearly doubled from $16,500 in 1960 to $26,600 in 1970. In 1970, the median price of a home was $22,100 to $25,700.
- 1974: Equal Credit Opportunity Act imposes heavy sanctions for financial institutions found guilty of discrimination on the basis of race, color, religion, national origin, sex, marital status, or age.
- 1975: In January 1975, the Median Home Price was $37,200, while the Average Home Price was $39,500.
- 1977: Community Reinvestment Act passed to encourage banks and savings and loan associations to offer credit to minority groups on lower incomes or owning small businesses 12 U.S.C. § 2901 et seq.). Beforehand, the companies had been engaging in a practice known as redlining.
- July, 1978: Section 121 allowed for a $100,000 one-time exclusion in capital gain for sellers 55 years or older at the time of sale.
- 1980: In January 1980, the Median Home Price was $62,900, while the Average Home Price was $72,400. The Depository Institutions Deregulation and Monetary Control Act of 1980 granted all thrifts, including savings and loan associations, the power to make consumer and commercial loans and to issue transaction accounts, but with little regulatory oversight of competing banks; also exempted federally chartered savings banks, installment plan sellers and chartered loan companies from state usury limits. The cost of a new home in 1980 is $76,400 ($189,918 in 2007 dollars).
- 1981: The Section 121 exclusion, allowing for a one-time exclusion in capital gain for sellers 55 years or older at the time of sale, was increased from $100,000 to $125,000.
- 1981: Each Federal Reserve bank establishes a Community Affairs Office to ensure compliance with Community Reinvestment Act.
- 1985: In January 1985, the Median Home Price was $82,500, while the Average Home Price was $98,300.
- 1985–1991: Savings and Loan Crisis caused by rising interest rates and over development in the commercial real estate sector, and exacerbated by deregulation of savings and loan lending standards and a reduction in capital reserve requirements from 5% to 3%.
- 1986: The Tax Reform Act of 1986 eliminated the tax deduction for interest paid on credit cards, encouraging the use of home equity through refinancing, second mortgages and home equity lines of credit (HELOC) by consumers.
- 1986–1991: New homes constructed dropped from 1.8 to 1 million, the lowest rated since World War II.
- 1989: One-month drop in sales of previously owned homes of 12.6 percent.; Financial Institutions Reform, Recovery and Enforcement Act (FIRREA) enacted which established the Resolution Trust Corporation (RTC), closing hundreds of insolvent thrifts and moved regulatory authority to the Office of Thrift Supervision (OTS); required federal agencies to issue Community Reinvestment Act ratings publicly.
- 1990: In January 1990, the Median Home Price was $125,000, while the Average Home Price was $151,700. The average cost of a new home in 1990 is $149,800 ($234,841 in 2007 dollars).
- 1991–1997: Flat Housing prices.
- 1991: US recession, new construction prices fall, but above inflationary growth allows them to return by 1997 in real terms.

== 1992 - 2000 ==
- 1992: Federal Housing Enterprises Financial Safety and Soundness Act of 1992 required Fannie Mae and Freddie Mac to devote a percentage of their lending to support affordable housing increasing their pooling and selling of such loans as securities; Office of Federal Housing Enterprise Oversight (OFHEO) created to oversee them.
- 1994: Riegle-Neal Interstate Banking and Branching Efficiency Act of 1994 (IBBEA) repeals the interstate provisions of the Bank Holding Company Act of 1956 that regulated the actions of bank holding companies.
- 1995:
  - January: The Median Home Price was $127,900, while the Average Home Price dropped to $147,400, down from $151,700 in January 1990. New Community Reinvestment Act regulations break down home-loan data by neighborhood, income, and race; encourage community groups to complain to banks and regulators by allowing community groups that marketed loans to collect a brokers fee; Fannie Mae allowed to receive affordable housing credit for buying subprime securities.
- 1997: Mortgage denial rate of 29 percent for conventional home purchase loans.
  - July: The Taxpayer Relief Act of 1997 repealed the Section 121 exclusion and section 1034 rollover rules, and replaced them with a $500,000 married/$250,000 single exclusion of capital gains on the sale of a home, available once every two years. This encouraged people to buy more expensive first homes, as well as invest in second homes and investment properties.
  - November: Fannie Mae helped First Union Capital Markets and Bear, Stearns & Co launch the first publicly available securitization of CRA loans, issuing $384.6 million of such securities. All carried a Fannie Mae guarantee as to timely interest and principal.
- 1998:
  - September 23, 1998: New York Fed brings together consortium of investors to bail out Long-Term Capital Management.
  - 1998: Inflation-adjusted home price appreciation exceeds 10%/year in most West Coast metropolitan areas.
  - October: "Financial Services Modernization Act" killed in Senate because of no restrictions on Community Reinvestment Act-related community groups written into law.
- 1999:
  - July: President Clinton's Housing Urban Development (HUD) Secretary, Andrew Cuomo announces on July 29, 1999 - ACTION TO PROVIDE $2.4TRILLION IN MORTGAGES FOR AFFORDABLE HOUSING FOR 28.1 MILLION FAMILIES
  - July: Countrywide Financial and FannieMae ink a Strategic agreement which will lead Countrywide to become the country's leading mortgage provider to poor minorities by the end of 2000. Countrywide, Fannie Ink Pact National Mortgage News and SourceMedia, Inc., July 9, 1999
  - September: Fannie Mae eases the credit requirements to encourage banks to extend home mortgages to individuals whose credit is not good enough to qualify for conventional loans.
  - November: Gramm-Leach-Bliley Act "Financial Services Modernization Act" repeals Glass–Steagall Act, deregulates banking, insurance and securities into a financial services industry allow financial institutions to grow very large; limits Community Reinvestment Coverage of smaller banks and makes community groups report certain financial relationships with banks.
- 1995–2001: Dot-com bubble.
  - March 10, 2000: NASDAQ Composite index peaked, Dot-com bubble collapse begins.
- 2000:
  - January: The Median Home Price was $163,500, while the Average Home Price was $200,300.
  - October: Oct. 2000 - HUD Sec Andrew Cuomo ANNOUNCES NEW REGULATIONS TO PROVIDE $2.4 TRILLION IN MORTGAGES FOR AFFORDABLE HOUSING FOR 28.1 MILLION FAMILIES
  - October: Fannie Mae committed to purchase and securitize $2 billion of Community Investment Act-eligible loans.
  - November: Fannie Mae announced that the Department of Housing and Urban Development (“HUD”) would soon require it to dedicate 50% of its business to low- and moderate-income families" and its goal was to finance over $500 billion in Community Investment Act-related business by 2010.
  - December: Commodity Futures Modernization Act of 2000 defines interest rates, currency prices, and stock indexes as "excluded commodities," allowing trade of credit-default swaps by hedge funds, investment banks or insurance companies with minimal oversight, and contributing to 2008 crisis in Bear Stearns, Lehman Brothers, and AIG.

== 2001 - 2006 ==
- 1997–2005: Mortgage fraud increased by 1,411 percent.
- 2000–2003: Early 2000s recession (exact time varies by country).
- 2001–2005: United States housing bubble (part of the world housing bubble).
- 2001: US Federal Reserve lowers Federal funds rate eleven times, from 6.5% to 1.75%.
- 2002–2003: Mortgage denial rate of 14 percent for conventional home purchase loans, half of 1997.
- 2002: Annual home price appreciation of 10% or more in California, Florida, and most Northeastern states."Annual home-value growth at highest rate since 1980".
  - June 17: President W. Bush sets goal of increasing minority home owners by at least 5.5 million by 2010 through tax credits, subsidies and a Fannie Mae commitment of $440 billion to establish NeighborWorks America with faith-based organizations.
- 2003: Fannie Mae and Freddie Mac buy $81 billion in subprime securities.
  - June: Federal Reserve Chair Alan Greenspan lowers federal reserve's key interest rate to 1%, the lowest in 45 years.
  - September: Bush administration recommended moving governmental supervision of Fannie Mae and Freddie Mac under a new agency created within the Department of the Treasury. The changes were blocked by Congress.
  - December: President Bush signs the American Dream Downpayment Act to be implemented under the Department of Housing and Urban Development. The goal was to provide a maximum downpayment assistance grant of either $10,000 or six percent of the purchase price of the home, whichever was greater. In addition, the Bush Administration committed to reforming the homebuying process that would lower closing costs by approximately $700 per loan. It was said it would further stimulate homeownership for all Americans.
- 2003-2007: The Federal Reserve failed to use its supervisory and regulatory authority over banks, mortgage underwriters and other lenders, who abandoned loan standards (employment history, income, down payments, credit rating, assets, property loan-to-value ratio and debt-servicing ability), emphasizing instead lender's ability to securitize and repackage subprime loans.
- 2004:
  - U.S. homeownership rate peaked with an all-time high of 69.2 percent.
  - HUD increased Fannie Mae and Freddie Mac affordable-housing goals for next four years, from 50 percent to 56 percent, stating they lagged behind the private market; from 2004 to 2006, they purchased $434 billion in securities backed by subprime loans.
  - October: SEC effectively suspends net capital rule for five firms - Goldman Sachs, Merrill Lynch, Lehman Brothers, Bear Stearns and Morgan Stanley. Freed from government-imposed limits on the debt they can assume, they levered up 20, 30 and even 40 to 1.
- 2004–2005: Arizona, California, Florida, Hawaii, and Nevada record price increases in excess of 25% per year.
- 2004-2006: The Federal Reserve hiked interest rates in 17 consecutive quarterly meetings from 1% to 6.25% to slow the economy and forestall inflation. This greatly increased the cost of lending, especially for loans indexed to the Fed's rates, including short-term adjustable rate mortgages. Many borrowers, especially subprime, saw their mortgage payments skyrocket as much as 60% after periodic resetting to their index.
- 2005: United States housing market correction ("bubble bursting").
  - January: The Median Home Price was $223,100, while the Average Home Price was $283,000.
  - February: The Office of Thrift Supervision implemented new rules that allowed savings and loans with over $1 billion in assets to meet their CRA obligations without investing in local communities, cutting availability of subprime loans.
  - September: The Federal Deposit Insurance Corporation, Federal Reserve, and the Office of the Comptroller of the Currency allow loosening of Community Reinvestment Act requirements for "small" banks, further cutting subprime loans.
  - Fall: Booming housing market halts abruptly; from the fourth quarter of 2005 to the first quarter of 2006, median prices nationwide dropped off 3.3 percent.
  - Year-end: A total of 846,982 properties were in some stage of foreclosure in 2005.
- 2006: Continued market slowdown. Prices are flat, home sales fall, resulting in inventory buildup. U.S. Home Construction Index is down over 40% as of mid-August 2006 compared to a year earlier. A total of 1,259,118 foreclosures were filed during the year, up 42 percent from 2005.

== 2005 ==
- Year-end: About 885,000 foreclosures notices were filed on 846,982 properties during the year. Less than 1 percent of all households were in some stage of foreclosure during 2005.

== 2006 ==
- Year-end: More than 1.25 million foreclosure notices were filed on more than 800,000 properties during the year. One in 92 of all households were in some stage of foreclosure during 2006.

== 2007 ==
Year-to-year decreases in both U.S. home sales and home prices accelerates rather than slowing, with U.S. Treasury secretary Paulson calling "the housing decline ... the most significant risk to our economy." Home sales continue to fall. The decrease in existing-home sales is the steepest since 1989. In Q1/2007, S&P/Case-Shiller house price index records first year-over-year decline in nationwide house prices since 1991. The subprime mortgage industry collapses, foreclosure activity increases and rising interest rates threaten to depress prices further as problems in the subprime markets spread to the near-prime and prime mortgage markets.

- February–ongoing: 2007 subprime mortgage financial crisis - more than 25 subprime lenders declare bankruptcy, announce significant losses, or put themselves up for sale.
- April 2: New Century Financial, largest U.S. subprime lender, files for chapter 11 bankruptcy.
- July 19: Dow Jones Industrial Average closes above 14,000 for the first time in its history.
- August: worldwide "credit crunch" as subprime mortgage backed securities are discovered in portfolios of banks and hedge funds around the world, from BNP Paribas to Bank of China. Many lenders stop offering home equity loans and "stated income" loans. Federal Reserve injects about $100B into the money supply for banks to borrow at a low rate.
- August 6: American Home Mortgage files for chapter 11 bankruptcy.
- August 7: Democratic presidential front-runner Hillary Clinton proposes a $1 billion bailout fund to help homeowners at risk for foreclosure.
- August 16: Countrywide Financial Corporation, the biggest U.S. mortgage lender, narrowly avoids bankruptcy by taking out an emergency loan of $11 billion from a group of banks.
- August 17: Federal Reserve lowers the discount rate by 50 basis points to 5.75% from 6.25%.
- August 31: President Bush announces a limited bailout of U.S. homeowners unable to pay the rising costs of their debts. Ameriquest, once the largest subprime lender in the U.S., goes out of business.
- September 1–3: Fed Economic Symposium in Jackson Hole, WY addressed the housing recession that jeopardizes U.S. growth. Several critics argued that the Fed should use regulation and interest rates to prevent asset-price bubbles, blamed former Fed-chairman Alan Greenspan's low interest rate policies for stoking the U.S. housing boom and subsequent bust, and Yale University economist Robert Shiller warned of possible home price declines of 50 percent.
- September 14: A run on the bank forms at the United Kingdom's Northern Rock bank precipitated by liquidity problems related to the subprime crisis.
- September 17: Former Fed Chairman Alan Greenspan said "we had a bubble in housing" and warns of "large double digit declines" in home values "larger than most people expect."
- September 18: The Fed lowers interest rates by half a percent (50 basis points) to 4.75% in an attempt to limit damage to the economy from the housing and credit crises.
- September 28: Television finance personality Jim Cramer warns Americans on The Today Show, "don't you dare buy a home—you'll lose money," causing a furor among Realtors.
- September 30: Affected by the spiraling mortgage and credit crises, Internet banking pioneer NetBank goes bankrupt NetBank Inc was the largest savings and loan failure since the tail end of the Savings and Loan crisis in the early 1990s. and the Swiss bank UBS announced that it lost US$690 million in the third quarter.
- September 30:Prices fell 4.9 percent from September 2006 in 20 large metropolitan areas, according to Standard & Poor's/Case-Shiller indexes. This is the 9th straight month prices have fallen.
- October 10: US Government and private industry created Hope Now Alliance to help some sub-prime borrowers.
- October 15–17: A consortium of U.S. banks backed by the U.S. government announced a "superfund" or "super-SIV" of $100 billion to purchase mortgage-backed securities whose mark-to-market value plummeted in the subprime collapse. Fed chairman Ben Bernanke expressed alarm about the dangers posed by the bursting housing bubble; Treasury Secretary Hank Paulson said "the housing decline is still unfolding and I view it as the most significant risk to our economy. ... The longer housing prices remain stagnant or fall, the greater the penalty to our future economic growth."
- October 31: Federal Reserve lowers the federal funds rate by 25 basis points to 4.5 percent and the discount window rate by 25 basis points to 5 percent.
- October 31: Prices fell 6.1 percent from October 2006 in 20 large metropolitan areas, according to Standard & Poor's/Case-Shiller indexes. This is the 10th straight month prices have fallen.
- November 1: Federal Reserve injects $41B into the money supply for banks to borrow at a low rate. The largest single expansion by the Fed since $50.35B on September 19, 2001.
- December 6: President Bush announced a plan to voluntarily freeze the mortgages of a limited number of mortgage debtors holding ARMs for 5 years. The plan run by the Hope Now Alliance. Its phone number is 1-888-995-HOPE. Some experts criticized the plan as "a Band-Aid when the patient needs major surgery", a "teaser-freezer", and a "bail-out".
- December 11: Federal Reserve lowers the federal funds rate by 25 basis points to 4.25 percent and the discount window rate by 25 basis points to 4.75 percent.
- December 12: Federal Reserve injects $40B into the money supply for banks to borrow at a low rate and coordinates such efforts with central banks from Canada, United Kingdom, Switzerland and European Union.
- December 24: A consortium of banks officially abandons the U.S. government-supported "super-SIV" mortgage crisis bail-out plan announced in mid-October, citing a lack of demand for the risky mortgage products on which the plan was based, and widespread criticism that the fund was a flawed idea that would have been difficult to execute.
- December 26: Standard & Poor's/Case-Shiller indexes of housing prices in 20 large metropolitan areas for October 2007 is released showing that for the 10th straight month priced have fallen, but most worrying is that the decline in home prices accelerated and spread to more regions of the country in October. "Since their peak in July 2006, home prices in the 20 regions have dropped 6.6 percent. Economists' predictions of the total amount of home price declines from the bubble's peak range from moderate 10–15 percent to larger 30–50 percent price declines in some areas.
- December 28: The November U.S. Commerce Department's "stunningly weak report" released on December 28, 2007 show that year-to-year decreases in both U.S. home sales and home prices is accelerating rather than bottoming out due to "eminently rational behaviour" based on "a psychological point where expectations of future price declines have become entrenched".
- Year-end: A total of 2,203,295 foreclosures were filed on 1,285,873 properties during the year, up 75 percent from 2006. More than 1 percent of all households were in some stage of foreclosure during 2007, up from 0.58 percent in 2006.

== 2008 ==
Home sales continue to fall. Fears of a U.S. recession. Global stock market corrections and volatility.

- January 2–21: January 2008 stock market downturn.
- January 24: The National Association of Realtors (NAR) announced that 2007 had the largest drop in existing home sales in 25 years, and "the first price decline in many, many years and possibly going back to the Great Depression."
- March 10: Dow Jones Industrial Average at the lowest level since October 2006, falling more than 20% from its peak just five months prior.
- March 14–18: Dropping valuations of mortgage securities caused by skyrocketing default and foreclosure rates forces margin calls to the Wall Street bank Bear Stearns for debts the bank used to leverage mortgage issuances, and threatens BSC with bankruptcy and causes worldwide market jitters. In a weekend deal brokered by U.S. Treasury secretary Paulson and Fed chairman Ben Bernanke, JPMorgan bank agrees to purchase BSC for $2 per share, compared to their 2007 high of nearly $170, in exchange for the Federal Reserve Bank agreeing to accept BSC's devalued mortgage backed securities as collateral for public loans at the newly created Term Securities Lending Facility (TSLF), effectively providing a mechanism to bail out Wall Street banks threatened with insolvency.
- March 1–June 18: 406 people were arrested for mortgage fraud in an FBI sting across the U.S., including buyers, sellers and others across the wide-ranging mortgage industry.
- June 18: As the chairman of the Senate Banking Committee Connecticut's Christopher Dodd proposed a housing bailout to the Senate floor that would assist troubled subprime mortgage lenders such as Countrywide Bank, Dodd admitted that he received special treatment, perks, and campaign donations from Countrywide, who regarded Dodd as a "special" customer and a "Friend of Angelo." Dodd received a $75,000 reduction in mortgage payments from Countrywide. The Chairman of the Senate Finance Committee Kent Conrad and the head of Fannie Mae Jim Johnson also received mortgages on favorable terms due to their association with Countrywide CEO Angelo R. Mozilo.
- June 19: Ex-Bear Stearns fund managers were arrested by the FBI for their allegedly fraudulent role in the 2007 subprime mortgage financial crisis. The managers purportedly misrepresented the fiscal health of their funds to investors publicly while privately withdrawing their own money.
- July 30: Housing and Economic Recovery Act of 2008 changes the $250,000/$500,000 capital gains exclusion applying to second homes and rental property.
- Year-end: A total of 3,157,806 foreclosures were filed on 2,330,483 properties during the year, up 81 percent from 2007. More than 1.84 percent of all households were in some stage of foreclosure during 2008, up from 1.03 percent in 2007.

== 2009 ==
- Year-end: A total of 3,957,643 foreclosures were filed on 2,824,674 properties during the year, up 21 percent from 2008. More than 2.21 percent of all households were in some stage of foreclosure during 2009, up from 1.84 percent in 2008.

April 2, the mark to market method of valuing mortgage backed securities were abolished improving confidence in the asset class and trust between banks.

== 2010 ==
- January: The Median Home Price dropped to $218,200, while the Average Home Price was $283,400, only $400 more than January 2005.
- Mid-year: A total of 1,961,894 foreclosures were filed on 1,654,634 properties during the first half of the year, up 5 percent from same period last year. More than 1.28 percent of all households were in some stage of foreclosure during the first half of 2010.
- Year-end: A total of 3,825,637 foreclosures were filed on 2,871,891 properties during 2010, up nearly 2 percent from the previous year. More than 2.23 percent of all households were in some stage of foreclosure during 2010.

== 2011 ==
- Mid-year: A total of 1,170,402 properties received foreclosure notices during the first half of the year, down 29 percent from the same period in 2010. 0.9 percent of all households were in some stage of foreclosure during the first half of 2011.
- Year-end: A total of 1,887,777 properties received foreclosure notices during the year, down 34 percent from last year. 1.45 percent of all households were in some stage of foreclosure during 2011, compared to 2.23 percent in 2010. .

== 2012 ==
- Mid-year: A total of 1,045,801 properties received foreclosure notices during the first half of the year, a two percent increase over the previous six months, but down 11 percent from the same period in 2011. 0.79 percent of all households were in some stage of foreclosure during the first half of 2012.
- Year-end: A total of 1,836,634 properties received foreclosure notices during the year, down 3 percent from last year. 1.39 percent of all households were in some stage of foreclosure during 2012, compared to 1.45 percent in 2011.

== 2013 ==
- Mid-year: A total of 801,359 properties received foreclosure notices during the first half of the year, a 19 percent decrease over the previous six months, and 23 percent down from the same period in 2012. 0.61 percent of all households were in some stage of foreclosure during the first half of 2013.
- Year-end: A total of 1,361,795 properties received foreclosure notices during the year, down 26 percent from last year. 1.04 percent of all households were in some stage of foreclosure during 2012, compared to 1.39 percent in 2012.
- Price Appreciation: Nationwide median price for single family home appreciated 12.5% from 3Q 2012 to 3Q 2013, with some cities experiencing over 40% appreciation. In November 2013, Fitch Ratings sustainable home price model estimated that nationally, home prices are 17% overvalued, however this is concentrated in some markets more than others.

== 2014 ==
- Mid-year: A total of 613,874 properties received foreclosure notices during the first half of the year, a 19 percent decrease over the previous six months, and 23 percent down from the same period in 2013. 0.47 percent of all households were in some stage of foreclosure during the first half of 2014.
- Year-end: A total of 1,117,426 properties received foreclosure notices in 2014, an 18 percent decrease over 2013, 61 percent down from 2012, and the lowest since 2006. 0.85 percent of all households were in some stage of foreclosure during 2014.

== 2015 ==
- Mid-year: A total of 597,589 properties received foreclosure notices during the first half of the year, a 13 percent decrease over the previous six months, and 3 percent down from the same period in 2014. Properties that were repossessed in the first half of 2015 was 37 percent above the number of repossessions in the first half of 2006 (before the housing bubble burst).
- Year-end: A total of 1,083,572 properties received foreclosure notices in 2015, a 3 percent decrease over 2014, and the lowest in 9 years. 0.82 percent of all households were in some stage of foreclosure during 2015.

== 2016 ==
- Mid-year: A total of 533,813 properties received foreclosure notices during the first half of the year, an 11 percent decrease from the same period in 2015.
- Year-end: A total of 933,045 properties (0.7% of all housing units) received foreclosure notices during the year, a 14 percent decrease from 2015, the lowest since 2006 when 717,522 properties (0.58% of all housing units) received foreclosure notices.

== 2017 ==
- Mid-year: A total of 424,800 properties received foreclosure notices during the first half of the year, a 20 percent decrease from the same period in 2016.
- Year-end: 676,535 properties were in foreclosure in 2017, down 27 percent from the previous year.

== 2018 ==
- Mid-year: A total of 326,275 properties received foreclosure notices during the first half of the year, a 15 percent decrease from the same period in 2017.
- Year-End: 624,753 properties were in foreclosure in 2018, down 8 percent from the previous year.

== See also ==
- Subprime crisis impact timeline for the post-bubble timeline.
- 2008 financial crisis for the liquidity crisis and resulting global sharp reductions in the value of equities (stock), financial instruments, and commodities worldwide.
