= Joseph Bailey =

Joseph or Joe Bailey may refer to:

== Sports ==
- Joe Bailey (English footballer) (1890–1974), English footballer
- Joe Bailey (Australian footballer) (1921–1996), Australian rules footballer
- Joseph Bailey (cricketer) (born 1942), Bermudian cricketer
- Joe Bailey (ice hockey), Canadian ice hockey player
- Joe Bailey (wrestler) (1886–1951), Australian professional wrestler
- J. C. Bailey (Joseph Carl Bailey Jr., 1983–2010), American professional wrestler
- Joe Bailey (rugby union) (born 2004), English rugby union player

== Politics ==
- Sir Joseph Bailey, 1st Baronet (1783–1858), Welsh Ironmaster and MP for Worcester and Breconshire
- Joseph Bailey (Pennsylvania politician) (1810–1885), U.S. Representative from Pennsylvania
- Joseph Bailey (Sudbury MP) (1812–1850), British MP for Sudbury 1837–1841 and Herefordshire 1841–1850
- Joseph M. Bailey (1833–1895), American jurist and politician
- Joseph Bailey, 1st Baron Glanusk (1840–1906), British MP and Lord
- Joseph Bailey, 2nd Baron Glanusk (1864–1928), British Army officer and peer
- Joseph Weldon Bailey (1862–1929), Congressman and senator from Texas
- Joseph Weldon Bailey Jr. (1892–1943), Congressman from Texas and son of Joseph Weldon Bailey
- Joe Bailey, of The Baileys, an imaginary couple invented by Senator Chuck Schumer to assist with policy decisions

== Other ==
- Joseph Bailey (general) (1825–1867), American Civil War general
- Joseph Bailey (author), American author and psychologist
- Joe Bailey (policy basis), fictional character made up by United States senator Chuck Schumer

== See also ==
- Joseph Bailly (1774–1835), Canadian fur trader
- Joseph A. Bailly (1825–1883), American sculptor
- Joseph Baylee (1808–1883), theological writer
- Jo Bailey (born 1970), maiden name of Jo Silvagni, Australian model and television personality
