= Reactionary centrism =

Type of centrist ideology

Reactionary centrism is a term used by left-wing commentators to describe a form of political centrism that allegedly criticizes the left while pandering to the right.

== Overview ==
The term was coined by American activist and former Democratic aide Aaron Huertas in a 2018 essay. In his essay, Huertas argued that there was "a crisis of lopsided political polarization in the United States," where "a great deal of popular political commentary still approaches our politics with a strange form of unearned evenhandedness. Opinion columnists, influential academics, and think tankers feel a need to occupy a middle ground, even if it’s one that is increasingly a product of their own imaginations. As a result, they wind up giving the right wing a free pass or accepting its worst impulses as a reality we have to live with, while reserving their criticism and armchair quarterbacking for anyone to their left."

UK-based Palestinian-Lebanese researcher Elia Ayoub has defined the term as "centrists who often validate perceived concerns of the right and far right while blaming the left for the failures of centrist politics... those who are convinced that the way to do politics is to effectively treat the far right as ‘the people’, the default, the silent majority. They don’t view themselves as right wingers, but act as though right wing politics are always more popular with ‘the people.’" Toby Buckle of Prospect has defined reactionary centrists as "people who — while not exactly supportive of the political right — tend to view it as without agency, as if the radicalisation of US conservatism is the result of people responding to the excesses of social justice, incivility from the left or cultural disrespect... Reactionary centrists admonished liberals to be very careful in their language, to not call very obvious fascists fascist, lest they be further provoked. The solution was to give ground; if democrats made appeals to the centre, particularly if they moved right on immigration and trans rights, they could regain votes lost to Trump," saying that "the dynamic that defines reactionary centrism: the right must be understood, but never blamed. The left can be blamed, but need not be understood."

Historian Thomas Zimmer has argued that reactionary centrism is "fueled by a pervasive anxiety among elites who are convinced that the assault on traditional authority has gone too far," saying that it should be fundamentally conceptualised as "a struggle over authority — a struggle between those who want to uphold traditional authority vs. those who are challenging it."

== Debates ==
Some commentators have argued that the term is a pejorative rather than an accurate description of a political phenomenon. Pundit Jonathan Chait has criticized the term as "an insult for liberals who sometimes criticize the left," arguing that most centrists to whom the term has been applied in fact criticize the right more than they criticize the left and that the term is "a one-sided demand: The liberals must abstain from criticizing the left — or criticize only in the most respectful terms — because uninhibited attacks on the left help the right. The left, on the other hand, is free to attack liberals without inhibition. One cannot help but suspect the point of these rules is winning intra-left factional conflicts, not national elections." Huertas responded to Chait that his essay was directed against centrists whose only contribution to the left is to criticize it.

The term has been used in debates about centrism in the United States. Paul Rosenberg of Salon.com has argued that reactionary centrism has contributed to the success of the political career of Donald Trump, claiming that it played a role in events such as the backlash to the George Floyd protests, negative coverage of Hillary Clinton's 2016 presidential election campaign, campus free speech debates, a lack of substantive discussion of policy in news media, and alarmism over crime and the economy under the presidency of Joe Biden. Jeet Heer of The Nation has argued that it forms part of a counter-revolution within the Democratic Party to the emergence of a strong left-wing current within the party in the mid to late 2010s, including Bernie Sanders 2016 presidential campaign, the Squad, a resurgence of labour union organising within the US, the growth of support for Palestine among youth, as well as new social movements such as the MeToo movement and George Floyd protests.

The term has also been used by British commentators. British pundit Toby Buckle of Prospect has described the term as "a pejorative—no one self-identifies as one," but has argued that it "helps to highlight some of the patterns that have shifted British political discourse so far to the right" in the 2020s, citing examples such as the contrast between press coverage of the 2024 United Kingdom riots and of Palestine Action. Finn McRedmond of The New Statesman has argued that, while reactionary centrists believe themselves to be "pragmatic vanguards of consensus politics," they are prone to an "arduous game of self-deception – still believing they are the champions of civility, while completely vulnerable to wild, unverified rumours of plot," noting events in British politics such as conspiracies that Brexit was the result of a Russian psyops campaign, the appointment of Charlotte Owen, Baroness Owen of Alderley Edge to the House of Lords, and the Nigel Farage Coutts bank scandal. UK-based Palestinian-Lebanese researcher Elia Ayoub has argued that reactionary centrism has played a major role in shaping the ideologies of Morgan McSweeney and Keir Starmer, saying that they "commit themselves to deeply unpopular policies, including and especially among their own base... Labour is in power and yet acts as if Farage is the Prime Minister."

== See also ==
- A Letter on Justice and Open Debate
- Argument to moderation
- Backlash (sociology)
- Class reductionism
- False balance
- False equivalence
- Framing (social sciences)
- Horseshoe theory
- Intellectual Dark Web
- Joe and Eileen Bailey
- Left-conservatism
- Letter from Birmingham Jail
- Media bias in the United States
- Overton Window
- Reactionary
- Sanewashing
- Status quo bias
