= Janette Sadik-Khan =

Former commissioner of the New York City Department of Transportation

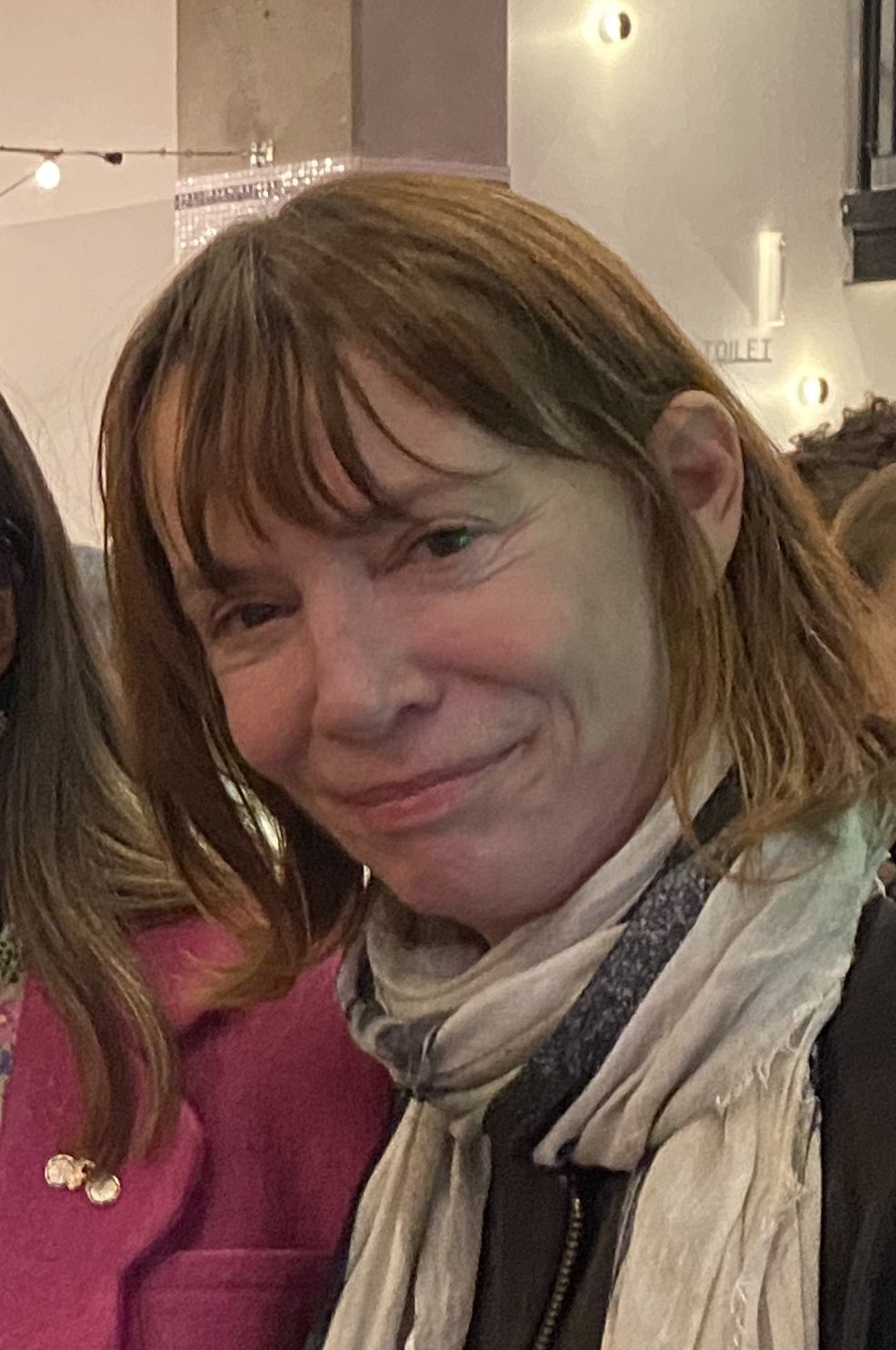
- Sadik-Khan in 2024

Commissioner of the New York City Department of Transportation
- In office April 13, 2007 – December 31, 2013
- Mayor: Michael Bloomberg
- Preceded by: Iris Weinshall
- Succeeded by: Polly Trottenberg

Personal details
- Born: April 28, 1961 (age 65) San Francisco, California, U.S.
- Party: Democratic
- Spouse: Mark Geistfeld
- Education: Occidental College (BA); Columbia University (JD)
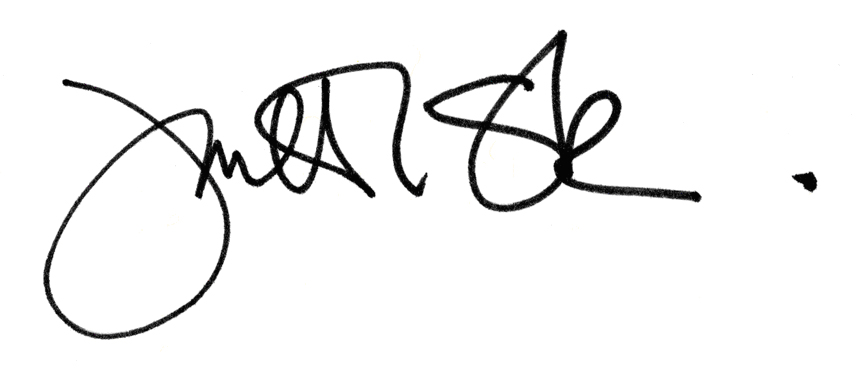
- Signature
- Website: Official website

Janette Sadik-Khan (born April 28, 1961) is a former commissioner of the New York City Department of Transportation (2007–2013) and an advisor on transportation and urban issues. She works for Bloomberg Associates, a philanthropic consultancy established by former Mayor Michael R. Bloomberg that advises mayors around the world to improve the quality of life for their residents. She serves as chairperson for the National Association of City Transportation Officials (NACTO), a coalition of the transportation departments of 40 large cities nationwide. She joined the board of the Metropolitan Transportation Authority in July 2026 as an appointee of Mayor Zohran Mamdani.

== Early life and education ==
Sadik-Khan was born in San Francisco, California, and moved to New York City as a child. She is the daughter of Orhan Idris Sadik-Khan (1929-2007), managing director of UBS Paine Webber, and his first wife Jane McCarthy, an environmental activist, one of the founders of Citizens for Clean Air in NYC, an urban preservationist, Chief Administrator Officer at the Municipal Art Society, and advocate for criminal justice reform. Orhan Sadik-Khan was born in Finland, and grew up in Berlin and Cairo, son of Tatar parents; his father was the imam Alimjan Idris, and his mother a paediatrician.

She holds a B.A. in political science from Occidental College in Los Angeles, California, and a J.D. from Columbia University School of Law.

== Career ==
Sadik-Khan worked in the New York City Department of Transportation during the administration of David Dinkins and became the mayor's transportation advisor. Sadik-Khan subsequently worked as deputy administrator of the Federal Transit Administration at the United States Department of Transportation in Washington, D.C. under President Bill Clinton, and she was a senior vice president at Parsons Brinckerhoff, an international transportation engineering firm.

=== NYC DOT ===
Sadik-Khan was appointed transportation commissioner by New York City Mayor Michael Bloomberg in 2007 and served in that role until 2013. During her tenure, she initialised significant changes to New York City streets and public spaces, including the conversion of road space into bike lanes and into pedestrian plazas, notably along Broadway at Times Square and Herald Square, and the creation of the car-free streets summer program called Summer Streets. Called a "bicycle visionary" by the New York Times, "equal parts Jane Jacobs and Robert Moses," by New York magazine, and one of "The Most Innovative and Practical Thinkers of Our Time" by Slate, Sadik-Khan oversaw the building of nearly 400 miles (640 km) of bike lanes and more than 60 pedestrian plazas in New York City, and she worked with the Metropolitan Transportation Authority to create seven rapid bus routes across the city.

She led the creation of Citi Bike, a bike share network of 6,000 bikes—the nation's largest—which has since been expanded to 12,000 bikes in three boroughs. Over her six and a half years in office, approximately 180 acres (73 ha) of former New York City road space for motor vehicles was converted to use by bicycles and pedestrians, and another 44 acres (18 ha) designated as bus-only lanes.

Sadik-Khan's time in office was also marked by media controversy over her policies, and encountered sometimes vocal opposition. The transportation department was sued over the placement of bike lanes and bike share racks, and some projects were criticized in the news media. Despite the controversy, the bike lane, plaza and bike share programs that Sadik-Khan introduced were consistently supported in citywide polls by majorities of New Yorkers, and all lawsuits were ultimately dismissed or have yet to lead to the removal of any lane.

=== Bloomberg Associates ===
At Bloomberg Associates, she advises city mayors on transportation practices, including in Los Angeles, Mexico City, Rio de Janeiro, Oakland and Athens, and she speaks at international forums.

=== Author ===
She is the author of the book "Streetfight: Handbook for an Urban Revolution," based on her experience as commissioner and her new role as global transportation advisor.

== Awards ==
Year	Award	Organization
2011	Jane Jacobs Medal for New Ideas and Activism	Rockefeller Foundation
2011-2012	Edmund N. Bacon Memorial Award	Philadelphia Center for Architecture
2012	Rachel Carson Award	National Audubon Society
2012	George S. Lewis Award	American Institute of Architects
2012	Smart Solution Spotlight Award	ITS America
2012-2013	Lawrence M. Orton Award	American Planning Association
2013	Design Patron Award	Smithsonian Cooper-Hewitt, National Design Museum

== Personal life ==
She is married to Mark Geistfeld, a professor at New York University School of Law, with whom she has one child.

Political offices
Preceded by Iris Weinshall	Transportation Commissioner of New York City; 2007–2012	Succeeded by Polly Trottenberg
