= Iris Weinshall =

American politician (born 1953)

- Weinshall in 2002

Commissioner of the New York City Department of Transportation
- In office September 8, 2000 – April 13, 2007
- Appointed by: Rudy Giuliani
- Preceded by: Wilbur L. Chapman
- Succeeded by: Janette Sadik-Khan

Personal details
- Born: September 5, 1953 (age 73) Brooklyn, New York, U.S.
- Spouse: Chuck Schumer (m. 1980)
- Children: 2
- Education: Brooklyn College (BA); New York University (MPA)
- Occupation: Chief Operating Officer at The New York Public Library

Iris Weinshall (born September 5, 1953) is an American politician. She is the chief operating officer of the New York Public Library, former vice chancellor at the City University of New York and a former commissioner of the New York City Department of Transportation. Weinshall was appointed Chief Operating Officer by the Library in July 2014, and she began her tenure on September 1, 2014. She is married to U.S. Senator and Senate Minority leader Chuck Schumer.

== Education ==
Weinshall is a graduate of Brooklyn College and earned a Master of Public Administration degree from New York University Wagner Graduate School of Public Service.

== Career ==
She served as senior vice president of the New York State Urban Development Corporation, where she oversaw the development and implementation of the State's overall economic development program. She then held the position of Regional Vice President of Integrated Resources, Inc. where she structured limited partnerships for property acquisition and operation. She then served as President of the Financial Services Corporation, a nonprofit organization which functioned as the financing arm for the city's economic development initiatives.

From 1988 to 1996, Weinshall served as Deputy Commissioner for Management and Budget at the New York City Department of Environmental Protection. She also served as the First Deputy Commissioner of the Department of Citywide Administrative Services before being named Commissioner of the city's Department of Transportation, a post she held from 2000 to 2007.

=== Tenure as NYC DOT Commissioner ===
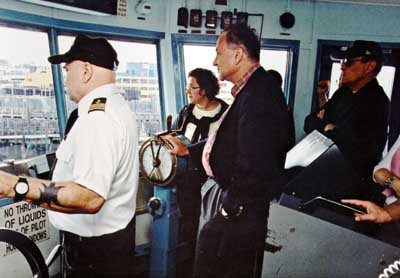
Weinshall, her husband Senator Chuck Schumer, and Mayor Rudy Giuliani on a ferry boat in the East River

Iris Weinshall was appointed commissioner of the New York City Department of Transportation by then-Mayor Rudy Giuliani on September 8, 2000, succeeding Wilbur L. Chapman. Commissioner Weinshall was one of a handful of Giuliani department heads to be reappointed by Mayor Michael Bloomberg.

Weinshall's DOT made efforts to reduce pedestrian injuries and fatalities on New York City's most dangerous street. By slowing traffic, changing traffic signal timing and adding new signage and pedestrian fencing, pedestrian injuries and fatalities were substantially reduced.

To enhance traffic flow in the city's most congested area, Midtown Manhattan, Weinshall and Mayor Bloomberg announced the 2003 THRU Streets Program. This program, which prohibits turns off of designated streets between 3rd and 6th Avenues, has reduced cross-town travel times by 25% and increased vehicle speeds by 33%. Weinshall considered this project one of her agency's most ambitious and successful projects. Pedestrian fences were installed near Rockefeller Center to separate traffic. Larger street signs to provide better visibility to drivers also promoted the usual goal of the department, "to keep the traffic moving" as she often stated it.

During her tenure at DOT commissioner, Weinshall prioritized traffic flow. One such initiative was installing pedestrian fencing to restrict pedestrian movement to increase automobile throughput in the densest part of Brooklyn. Her attempt to increase vehicle flow through historic Park Slope, Brooklyn, by making several avenues one-way was abandoned after hundreds of residents packed a meeting to argue that the plan would jeopardize pedestrian safety by encouraging speeding.

During her nearly seven-year tenure, the department also took important steps to rehabilitate and better maintain the city's bridges and roadways. Close to $3 billion was spent on rehabilitating the city's East River bridges and, thanks to new incentives clauses for contractors, much of the work was completed ahead of schedule.

In addition to her role as DOT Commissioner, Weinshall was appointed by Mayor Bloomberg to the Taxi and Limousine Commission and also served as the Special Transportation Advisor to the Mayor. She was responsible for shaping a transportation strategy for the city and guiding the New York City Taxi and Limousine Commission.

On January 29, 2007, Weinshall announced that she was stepping down as DOT commissioner and would take a job as CUNY's Vice Chancellor for Facilities Planning, Construction and Management. Her last day as commissioner was April 13, 2007. She was succeeded by Janette Sadik-Khan.

==== Staten Island Ferry ====
The Staten Island Ferry system transports 65,000 passengers a day on the five-mile ride between St. George Terminal on Staten Island and Whitehall Terminal in Manhattan. The boats operate 24 hours a day, 365 days a year and have been a vital municipal service since 1905. During Weinshall's tenure, DOT took a number of steps to modernize the Staten Island Ferry service. In February 2005, Weinshall joined Mayor Michael R. Bloomberg at the opening of the new Whitehall Ferry Terminal in Lower Manhattan. Later that year, in May, DOT celebrated the grand opening of the renovated St. George in Staten Island. Since 2004, DOT has also introduced three new, state-of-the-art ferries: the Guy V. Molinari, John J. Marchi, and most recently the Spirit of America. The $40-million, 310-foot vessels were built by the Manitowoc Marine Group in Marinette, Wisconsin, and replaced the Kennedy class ferries, which have been in operation for more than 40 years.

The normally low-profile job of DOT Commissioner came into the spotlight following the 2003 Staten Island Ferry crash that killed 11 passengers. After the deadly crash, Weinshall came under harsh criticism for allowing patronage relationships to compromise the safety of the ferry operations.

Since 2003, DOT has made significant progress to enhance safety on the Staten Island Ferry. In April 2004, Weinshall appointed Captain James C. DeSimone, a 30-year maritime-industry veteran to serve as Chief Operating Officer for the Staten Island Ferry and shortly thereafter appointed Margaret Gordon, a maritime safety and security expert, to serve as executive director of Safety and Security at the ferry. In October 2005, after a year-long effort to develop and implement a comprehensive safety management system for the Staten Island Ferry, the American Bureau of Shipping presented the Department of Transportation with a "Voluntary Document of Compliance Certificate" for the DOT Staten Island Ferry Division and "Voluntary Safety Management Certificates" for all operational ferryboats. The New York City Department of Transportation is now the first ferry operator in the United States to voluntarily comply with this internationally accepted safety regime.

==== Queens Boulevard ====
Not long after Weinshall assumed the post of NYC DOT commissioner, the issue of Queens Boulevard came to the forefront. For decades, Queens Boulevard had been the most dangerous road in New York City. During the period 1950–2000, over 27,000 people were injured on Queens Boulevard. From 1980 to 1984, 40 people were killed on a 2.5-mile-long (4.0 km) section of Queens Boulevard. From 2002 to 2004, there were 393 injuries and eight deaths. Queens Boulevard became known as the Boulevard of Death in the media, and the community began an outcry to make the road safer. New York Newsday and the New York Daily News got into a circulation war on the issue of the Boulevard of Death, and the DOT was under pressure to take action. Weinshall implemented pedestrian improvements on Queens Boulevard, including longer pedestrian-crossing times, a lowering of the speed limit from 35 mph (56 km/h) to 30 mph (48 km/h) and the construction of new pedestrian median refuges. The safety improvements have proven successful, without the predicted backups.

==== Bicycle issues ====
The Hudson River Greenway, a project of New York State Department of Transportation and Hudson River Park rather than NYCDOT, was improved. DOT installed bike lanes linking the East River bridges and Downtown Brooklyn, which is home to a growing cycling community. In 2006, Bicycling Magazine named New York one of the top bicycling cities in the United States.

Andrew Vesselinovitch, former Bicycle Program Director at DOT, resigned in 2006, accusing Weinshall's DOT of foot-dragging on bicycle safety and deliberately sabotaging fixes to known hazards on the Williamsburg Bridge. Vesselinovitch claimed that Weinshall prevented him from installing bike lanes, and that Deputy Commissioner Michael Primeggia told him to "butt out" when he attempted to fix bumps on the Williamsburg Bridge that were costing New York City millions in lawsuits. Following Vesselinovitch's departure, Weinshall appointed Ryan Russo as Director for Street Management and Safety, overseeing the department's bicycle and pedestrian initiatives. Russo previously worked in DOT's Brooklyn Borough Commissioner's Office where he developed and implemented a number of cycling and pedestrian safety improvements in Downtown Brooklyn.

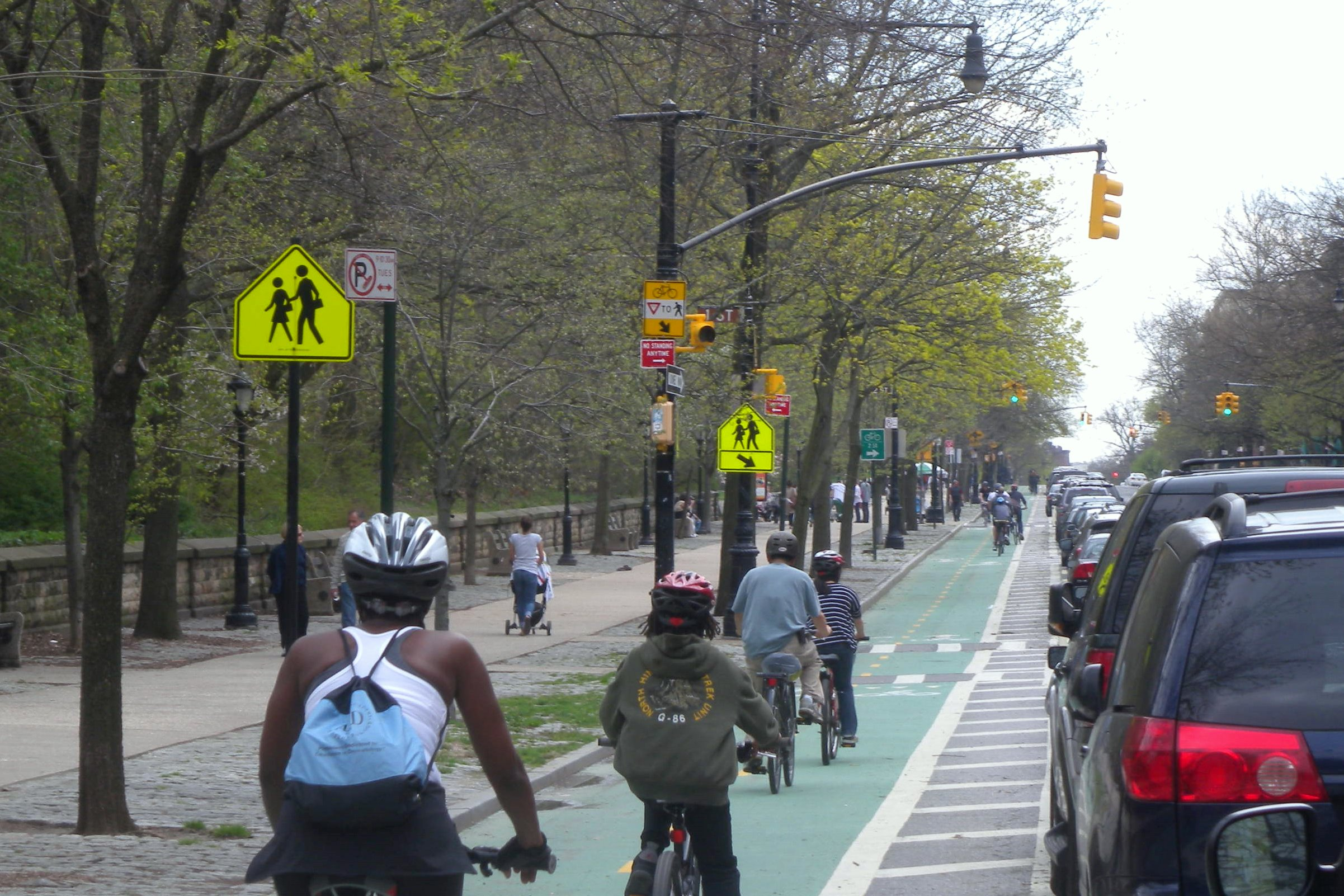
Prospect Park West

After Weinshall's departure, her successor at DOT, Janette Sadik-Khan, installed over 200 miles (320 km) of bike lanes in a 3-year period, compared to Weinshall's single-digit lane miles towards the end of her tenure. In her new position at the City University of New York, Weinshall has largely steered clear of New York City transportation policy issues, until the redesign of Prospect Park West in the spring of 2010. Opposed to the installation of a bicycling facility on her own street, Weinshall helped to organize a group calling itself Neighbors for Better Bike Lanes (NBBL) aimed at removing the bike lane.

=== Library of Congress Trust Fund Board ===
On May 20, 2022, Weinshall was appointed to a five-year term on the Library of Congress Trust Fund Board in order to fill a vacancy.

== Personal life ==
Weinshall is married to US Senator Chuck Schumer of New York. They have two daughters, Jessica and Alison, and live in Brooklyn.

Political offices
Preceded by Wilbur L. Chapman	Transportation Commissioner of New York City; 2000–2007	Succeeded by Janette Sadik-Khan
