= Jessica Schumer =

American lawyer and lobbyist

- Born: Jessica Emily Schumer; September 24, 1984 (age 42)
- Education: Harvard University (BA); Yale (JD)
- Occupations: Lawyer, lobbyist
- Employer: OpenAI
- Spouse: Michael Shapiro
- Parent(s): Iris Weinshall, Chuck Schumer

Jessica Schumer (born September 24, 1984) is an American lawyer and lobbyist. She currently works as Head of Northeast Policy and Partnerships for OpenAI.

== Early life and education ==
Born and raised in Brooklyn, New York, Schumer is the daughter of Iris Weinshall, Chief Operating Officer of the New York Public Library and U.S. Senator Chuck Schumer. She has one sister, Alison. She graduated from Stuyvesant High School, located near the Financial District, and was at school during the World Trade Center attacks on September 11, 2001.

Schumer attended Harvard University and Yale Law School.

== Career ==
In 2011, Schumer worked as a policy adviser and later the deputy chief of staff for the National Economic Council. She also worked as Chief of Staff at the Robin Hood Foundation, a New York nonprofit that funds antipoverty programs, and as chief of staff for the Council of Economic Advisers during the Obama Administration. Schumer served as policy director for Tim Kaine during his role as Hillary Clinton's running mate in the 2016 election. Following the election, she worked as executive director of Friends of the Brooklyn–Queens Connector.

In 2020, Schumer began working as a senior policy director for Amazon and in January 2026 became head of New York policy and community engagement. In August 2026, The American Prospect reported that Schumer was the lead lobbyist for Amazon against the Delivery Protection Act, which would require companies like Amazon to directly employ workers for deliveries as opposed to hiring contractors.

In February 2026, OpenAI announced Schumer had been hired as its head of policy and partnerships across the Northeast US.

== Personal life ==
Schumer married Michael Shapiro on April 17, 2016. The two met while working as policy advisers for the National Economic Council in 2011. The couple have two children.
