= Positively American =

2007 book by Chuck Schumer

- Author: Chuck Schumer, Daniel Squadron
- Publisher: Rodale Books
- Publication date: January 23, 2007
- ISBN: 9781594865725

Positively American: Winning Back the Middle-Class Majority One Family at a Time is a 2007 book by US senator Chuck Schumer from New York in which he outlines some of the thinking and strategies that helped the Democrats temporarily win the majority in Congress and the Senate in 2006.

Martha Stewart invited Schumer to talk about the book on her show and it was excerpted on her website.
