= Chuck Schumer =

American politician (born 1950)

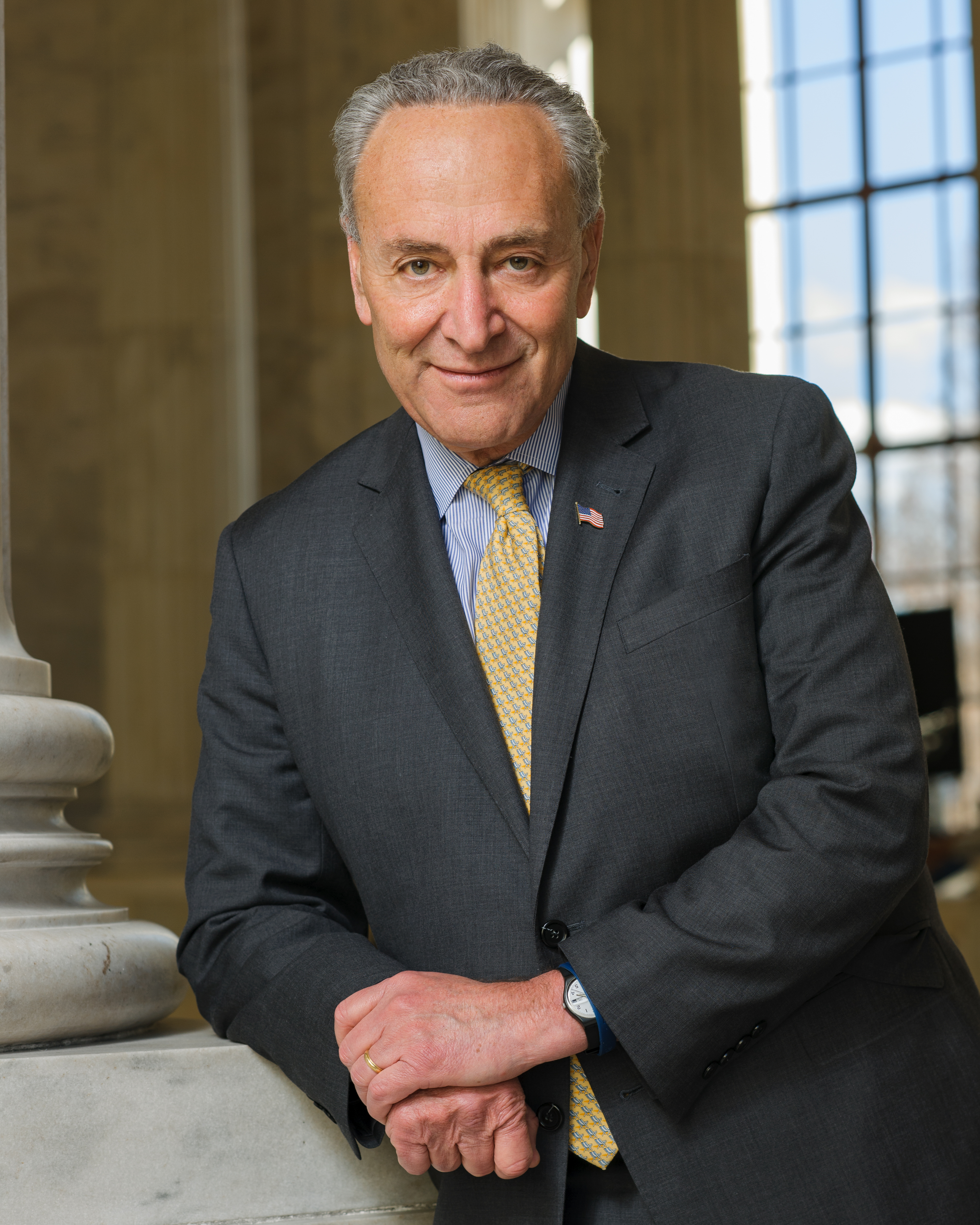
- Official portrait, 2017

United States Senator from New York
- Incumbent
- Assumed office January 3, 1999 Serving with Kirsten Gillibrand
- Preceded by: Al D'Amato

Senate Minority Leader
- Incumbent
- Assumed office January 3, 2025
- Whip: Dick Durbin
- Preceded by: Mitch McConnell
- In office January 3, 2017 – January 20, 2021
- Whip: Dick Durbin
- Preceded by: Harry Reid
- Succeeded by: Mitch McConnell
Senate positions
Senate Majority Leader
In office January 20, 2021 – January 3, 2025
Whip	Dick Durbin
Preceded by	Mitch McConnell
Succeeded by	John Thune
Leader of the Senate Democratic Caucus
Incumbent
Assumed office January 3, 2017
Preceded by	Harry Reid
Chair of the Senate Democratic Policy Committee
In office January 3, 2011 – January 3, 2017
Leader	Harry Reid
Preceded by	Byron Dorgan
Succeeded by	Debbie Stabenow
Chair of the Senate Rules Committee
In office January 3, 2009 – January 3, 2015
Preceded by	Dianne Feinstein
Succeeded by	Roy Blunt
Vice Chair of the Senate Democratic Caucus
In office January 3, 2007 – January 3, 2017
Leader	Harry Reid
Preceded by	Position established
Succeeded by	Mark Warner; Elizabeth Warren
Chair of the Democratic Senatorial Campaign Committee
In office January 3, 2005 – January 3, 2009
Leader	Harry Reid
Preceded by	Jon Corzine
Succeeded by	Robert Menendez

Member of the U.S. House of Representatives from New York
- In office January 3, 1981 – January 3, 1999
- Preceded by: Elizabeth Holtzman
- Succeeded by: Anthony Weiner
- Constituency: 16th district (1981–1983); 10th district (1983–1993); 9th district (1993–1999)

Member of the New York State Assembly from the 45th district
- In office January 1, 1975 – December 31, 1980
- Preceded by: Stephen Solarz
- Succeeded by: Daniel L. Feldman

Personal details
- Born: Charles Ellis Schumer; November 23, 1950 (age 75) New York City, U.S.
- Party: Democratic
- Spouse: Iris Weinshall (m. 1980)
- Children: 2, including Jessica
- Relatives: Amy Schumer (first cousin, once removed)
- Education: Harvard University (BA, JD)
- Website: Senate website Campaign website
- Schumer's voice Schumer's on Justice Anthony Kennedy's retirement Recorded June 27, 2018

Charles Ellis Schumer (Note: Pronunciation: /ˈʃuːmər/ SHOO-mər) (born November 23, 1950) is an American politician serving since 1999 as a United States senator from New York. A member of the Democratic Party, he has led the Senate Democratic Caucus since 2017 and served as Senate majority leader from 2021 to 2025. He has served two stints as Senate minority leader, from 2017 to 2021 and since 2025. He became New York's senior senator in 2001, upon Daniel Patrick Moynihan's retirement. Elected to a fifth term in 2022, Schumer surpassed Moynihan and Jacob K. Javits as the longest-serving U.S. senator from New York. He is the dean of New York's congressional delegation.

A native of Brooklyn and a graduate of Harvard College and Harvard Law School, Schumer was a three-term member of the New York State Assembly from 1975 to 1980. He served nine terms in the United States House of Representatives from 1981 to 1999, first representing New York's 16th congressional district before being redistricted to the 10th congressional district in 1983 and 9th congressional district 10 years later. In 1998, Schumer was elected to the Senate, defeating three-term Republican incumbent Al D'Amato. He was reelected in 2004 with 71% of the vote, in 2010 with 66% of the vote, in 2016 with 70% of the vote, and in 2022 with 56% of the vote.

Schumer chaired the Democratic Senatorial Campaign Committee from 2005 to 2009, overseeing 14 Democratic gains in the Senate in the 2006 and 2008 elections. He was the third-ranking Democrat in the Senate, behind Senate majority leader Harry Reid and majority whip Dick Durbin. He served as Vice Chair of the Democratic Caucus in the Senate from 2007 to 2017 and chaired the Senate Democratic Policy Committee from 2011 to 2017. Schumer won his fourth term in the Senate in 2016 and was then unanimously elected Democratic leader to succeed Reid, who was retiring.

In January 2021, Schumer became Senate majority leader, becoming the first Jewish Senate leader in U.S. history. As majority leader, Schumer shepherded through the Senate some of the Biden administration's major legislative initiatives, including the American Rescue Plan Act of 2021, the Infrastructure Investment and Jobs Act, the Inflation Reduction Act of 2022, the CHIPS and Science Act, the Bipartisan Safer Communities Act and the Respect for Marriage Act. Under his leadership, the Senate confirmed the most federal judges during the first two years of any presidency since John F. Kennedy's, and the most diverse slate of federal judicial nominations in American history, including Ketanji Brown Jackson, the first African American woman to serve on the Supreme Court.

== Early life and education (1950–1974) ==
Schumer was born on November 23, 1950, in Midwood, Brooklyn, the son of Selma (née Rosen) and Abraham Schumer. His father ran an exterminating business, and his mother was a homemaker. He and his family are Jewish, and he is a second cousin, once removed, of comedian Amy Schumer. His ancestors originated from the town of Chortkiv, Galicia, in what is now western Ukraine.

Schumer attended Brooklyn public schools, scoring 1600 on the SAT and graduating as the valedictorian of James Madison High School in 1967. He competed for Madison High on the television quiz show It's Academic. He attended Harvard College, where he originally majored in chemistry before switching to social studies after volunteering on Eugene McCarthy's presidential campaign in 1968. After graduating magna cum laude and Phi Beta Kappa in 1971, Schumer attended Harvard Law School, earning his Juris Doctor with honors in 1974. He passed the New York state bar exam in early 1975, but never practiced law, opting rather for a career in politics.

== Early career (1975–1998) ==
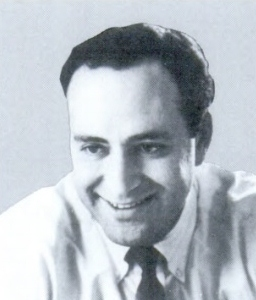
Schumer during the 100th Congress

In 1974, Schumer ran for and was elected to the New York State Assembly, filling a seat previously held by Schumer's mentor, U.S. representative Stephen Solarz. Schumer served three terms, from 1975 to 1981, sitting in the 181st, 182nd and 183rd New York State Legislatures.

In 1980, 16th district U.S. representative Elizabeth Holtzman won the Democratic nomination for the Senate seat of Republican Jacob Javits. Schumer ran for Holtzman's vacated House seat and won. He was reelected eight times from the Brooklyn and Queens-based district, which changed numbers twice in his tenure (it was numbered the 16th from 1981 to 1983, the 10th from 1983 to 1993, and the 9th from 1993). In 1982, as a result of redistricting, Schumer faced a potential matchup with Solarz, but the matchup did not materialize. In preparation, Schumer "set about making friends on Wall Street, tapping the city's top law firms and securities houses for campaign donations. 'I told them I looked like I had a very difficult reapportionment fight. If I were to stand a chance of being re-elected, I needed some help,' he would later tell the Associated Press."

Schumer introduced the Religious Freedom Restoration Act (also known as RFRA) on March 11, 1993.

As a member of the House Judiciary Committee, Schumer was one of four members of Congress who oversaw the House investigation (leading the Democratic party's defense of the Clinton administration), of the Waco siege hearings in 1995.

== U.S. Senate (1999–present) ==
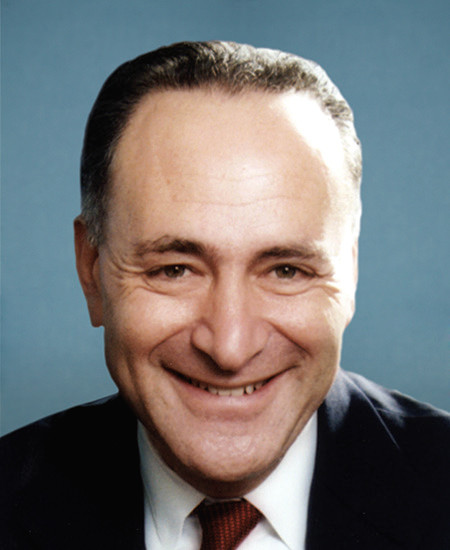
Schumer during the 107th Congress

In 1998, Schumer ran for the Senate. He won the Democratic primary with 51% of the vote against Geraldine Ferraro (21%) and Mark Green (19%). He received 54% of the vote in the general election, defeating three-term incumbent Republican Al D'Amato (44%).

In 2004, Schumer was reelected with 71% of the vote, defeating the Republican nominee, Assemblyman Howard Mills of Middletown, and conservative Marilyn F. O'Grady. Many New York Republicans were dismayed by the selection of Mills over the conservative Michael Benjamin, who held significant advantages over Mills in both fundraising and organization. Benjamin publicly accused GOP chairman Sandy Treadwell and governor George Pataki of trying to muscle him out of the Senate race and undermine the democratic process. Schumer defeated Mills by 2.8 million votes. He won every county in the state except Hamilton County, in the Adirondacks, the least populous and most Republican county. Mills conceded defeat minutes after the polls closed, before returns had come in.

An April 2009 SurveyUSA poll placed Schumer's approval rating at 62%, with 31% disapproving.

Notable former aides to Schumer include former U.S. representative Anthony Weiner, former New York state senator Daniel Squadron, and New York state assemblymembers Phil Goldfeder and Victor M. Pichardo.

Before the 2016 United States presidential election, Schumer said, "For every blue-collar Democrat we lose in western Pennsylvania, we will pick up two moderate Republicans in the suburbs in Philadelphia. And you can repeat that in Ohio and Illinois and Wisconsin." This assertion was criticized by left-wing and conservative voices.

After the 2016 election, Schumer said the Democrats lost because they lacked "a strong, bold economic message" and he called on Democrats to push for reforms in the affordability of college and trade laws.

In December 2025, Schumer said that his offices in New York City, Long Island, Rochester, and Binghamton had been the targets of multiple bomb threats, sent in emails with the subject line "MAGA". The emails also said that "the 2020 election was rigged". Local and federal staff conducted appropriate security sweeps.

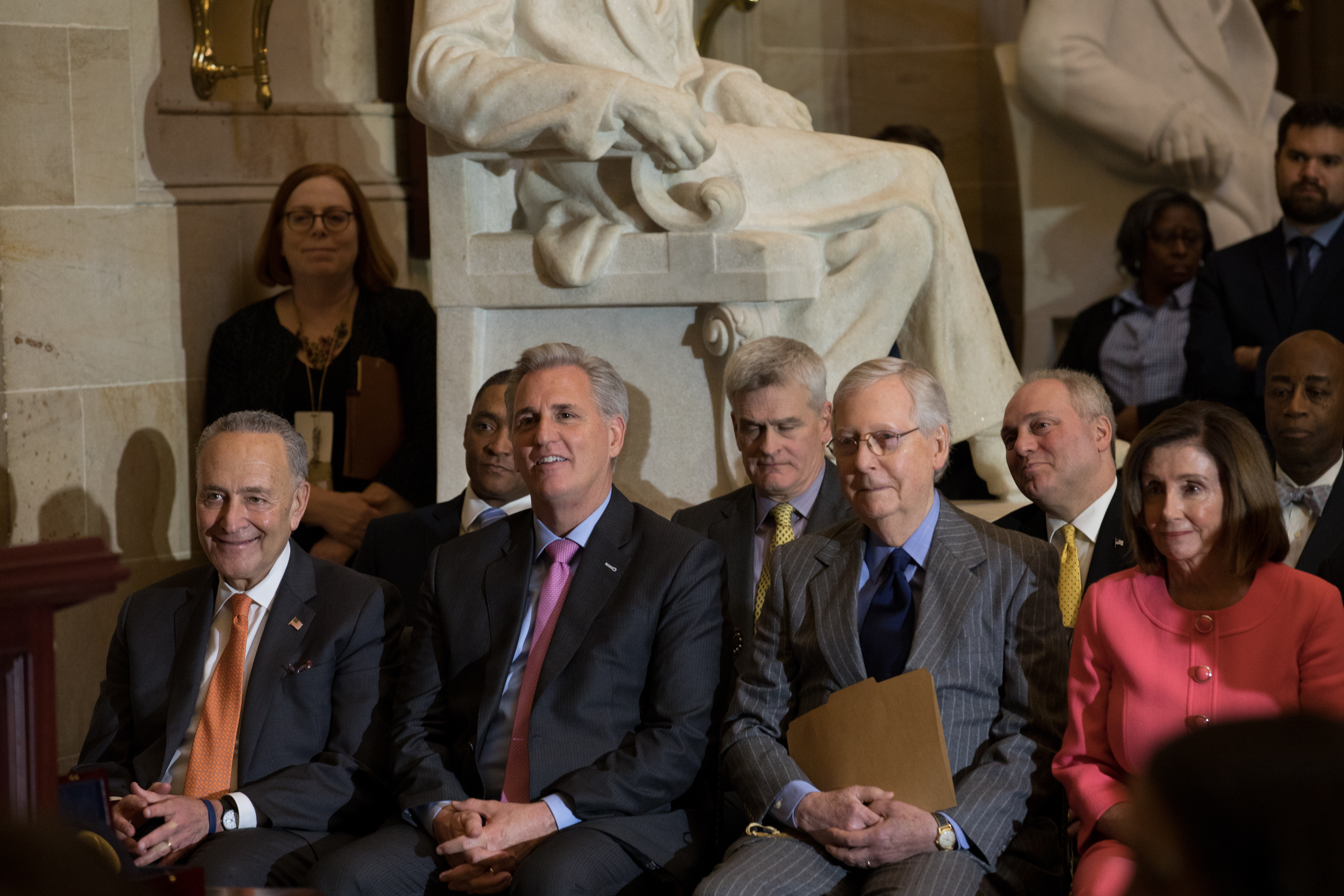
Schumer with his fellow congressional leaders in January 2020

=== Senate Democratic Caucus leader ===
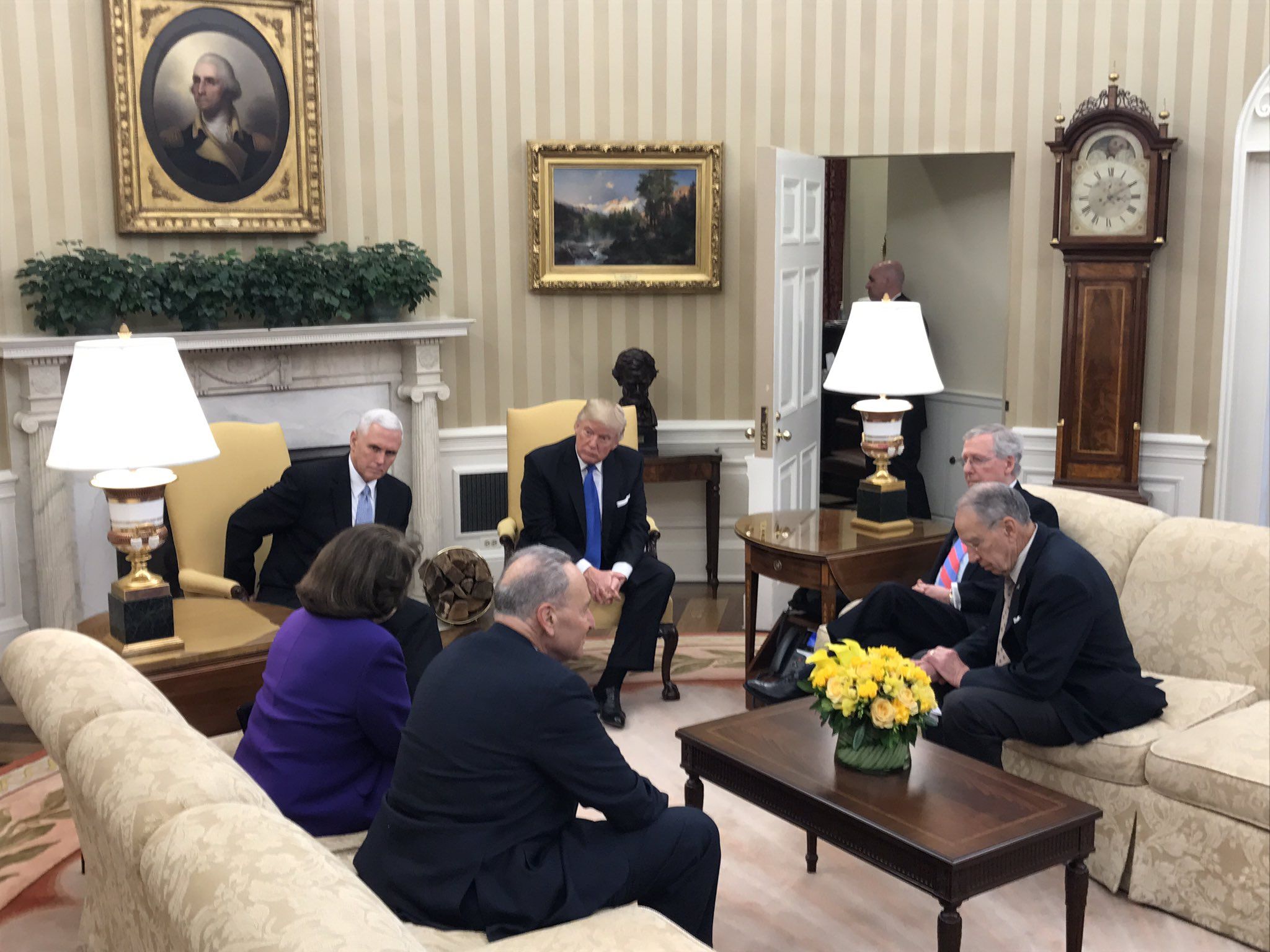
Schumer meeting with Donald Trump and Mike Pence in the Oval Office, January 24, 2017

The Senate Democratic Caucus elected Schumer minority leader in November 2016. Schumer had been widely expected to lead Senate Democrats after Reid announced his retirement in 2015. He is the first New Yorker, as well as the first Jewish person, to serve as a Senate leader. On January 20, 2021, Democrats gained control of the Senate with the swearing-in of newly elected Georgia senators Jon Ossoff and Raphael Warnock, following the 2020–21 election runoff and special election runoff, making Schumer the majority leader, replacing Republican Mitch McConnell.

==== Deal with Senate Republicans on circuit judicial vacancies at end of Biden term ====
During Schumer's final months as Senate Majority Leader in the 118th Congress, Senate Democrats struck a deal with the chamber's Republican minority that gave President Trump the ability to fill four circuit judgeships during the first year of his second term in exchange for Democrats being able to hold votes on several federal district court nominees in a chamber they already controlled. As a result of the deal and President Biden's decision not to nominate a candidate for a Third Circuit vacancy in Delaware, Trump later appointed Whitney Hermandorfer, Emil Bove, Jennifer Mascott, and Joshua Dunlap to the vacant circuit judgeships that Senate Democrats declined to fill when Schumer led the chamber.

==== March 2025 conflict over funding bill ====
On March 12, 2025, Schumer announced his opposition to the House-passed continuing resolution (CR) to fund the 2025 United States federal budget until September 30, 2025. The next day, he reversed his position, writing in The New York Times that "a shutdown would give Mr. Trump and Mr. Musk permission to destroy vital government services at a significantly faster rate". This drew the ire of many House Democrats, including Alexandria Ocasio-Cortez and Nancy Pelosi. This alone caused his book tour to be postponed for security reasons. He ultimately voted to advance the budget proposal, along with nine other Democrats. After the vote, Schumer faced pressure to step down as Senate leader, but he said he had no intention to do so.

==== 2026 Senate Democratic Caucus leadership election ====
Schumer with elected senate democrats in 2026

In the wake of a sweeping Democratic electoral victory in November 2026, The New York Times reported that Schumer has claimed to have secured commitments of support from enough Democratic senators to be elected majority leader at the Senate Democratic Caucus leadership election scheduled for December 2026. Senator Chris Van Hollen announced he would challenge Schumer.

=== Political style ===
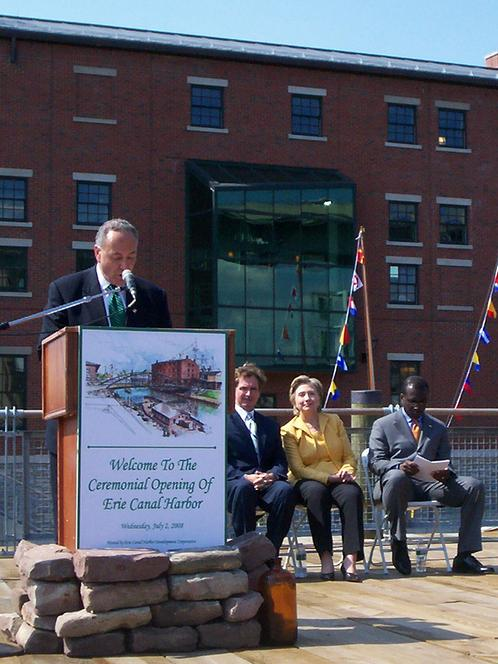
Schumer and Hillary Clinton at Erie Canal Harbor opening ceremony

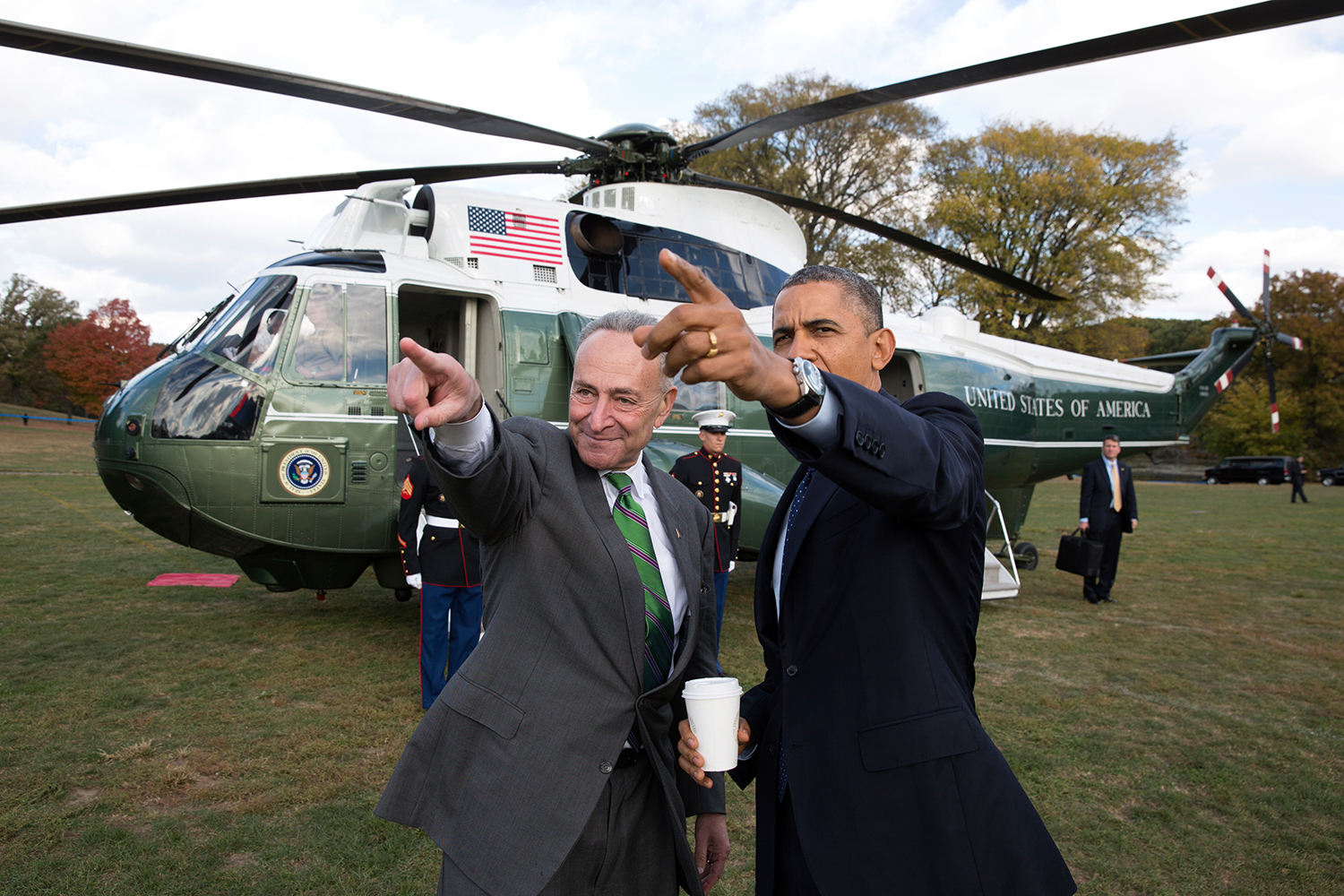
Schumer and President Barack Obama in October 2013

Schumer's propensity for publicity is the subject of a running joke among many commentators. He has been called an "incorrigible publicity hound". Bob Dole once quipped, "the most dangerous place in Washington is between Charles Schumer and a television camera"; Barack Obama joked that Schumer brought the press to a banquet as his "loved ones". Schumer often schedules media appearances on Sundays. Some have cited his use of media as a successful way to raise a politician's profile nationally and among his constituents. Schumer has appeared on The Daily Show seven times.

In Washington, Schumer has been a lead consensus-builder on health care, immigration, and financial regulation.

As chair of the Joint Congressional Committee on Inaugural Ceremonies for the second inauguration of Barack Obama, Schumer played a key role in organizing the event, gave the opening speech and served as master of ceremonies. A photograph of a smiling Schumer peering from behind Malia Obama as Obama took the oath of office went viral and became a meme. Although it was called a "photobomb", it was not technically one as he was standing in the correct place. The Huffington Post quipped, "clearly, inauguration day belonged to Chuck Schumer."

Schumer has long claimed that his political decisions are guided by an imaginary middle-class couple, Joe and Eileen Bailey (initially O'Reilly), swing voters living in the Long Island suburb of Massapequa; he described them in his 2007 book Positively American. They were the focus of a 2025 segment on Last Week Tonight in which John Oliver mocked the idea of the Baileys and criticized Schumer for using them as guidance. Pointing out that Schumer has claimed that the Baileys had either voted for Trump or abstained from voting for president since 2016, Oliver criticized Schumer for attempting to tailor Democratic policy toward right-wing suburban voters like the Baileys while alienating other parts of the Democratic base and additional non-voters in the process.

=== Supreme Court ===
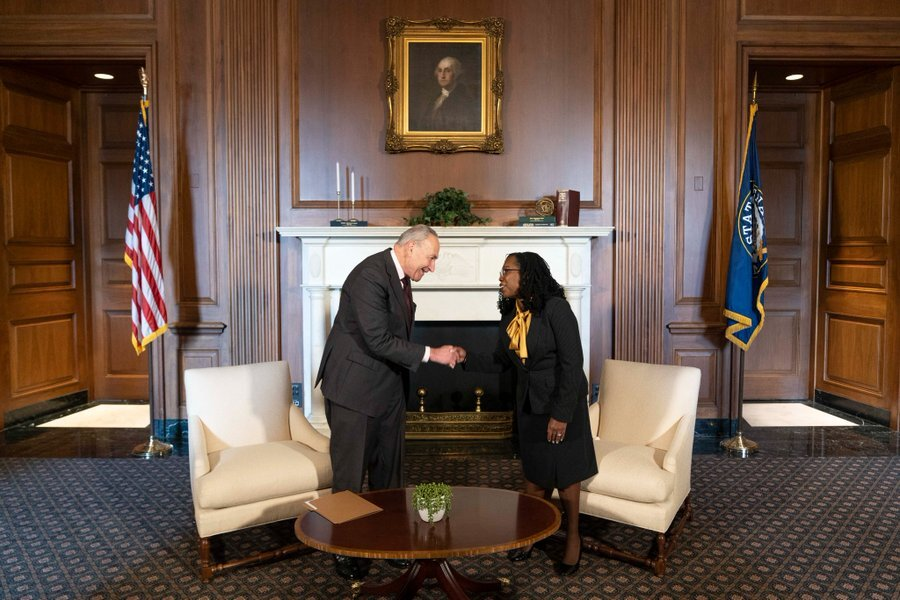
Schumer meeting with Supreme Court nominee Ketanji Brown Jackson

In September 2005, after President George W. Bush nominated John Roberts for Chief Justice of the United States, Schumer praised Roberts's brilliance, his being "a lawyer above all", and his "judicial philosophy and modesty and stability" during the Senate Judiciary Committee's confirmation hearings for Roberts, but Schumer said Roberts's "compassion and humanity" was questionable, and objected to the Bush administration's refusal to show documents Roberts wrote during his tenure as deputy solicitor general and to Roberts's refusal to answer many questions the committee asked him. In June 2018, Schumer said Roberts was demeaning the Supreme Court as it became more political, citing the court ruling in favor of anti-abortion clinics in California. Schumer said the court had "affirmed a plainly discriminatory travel ban, unleashed a flood of dark unlimited money in our politics and has scrapped a key pillar of the Voting Rights Act" and thereby aligned itself with goals of what he called "the hard right".

In October 2005, Schumer said Bush Supreme Court nominee Harriet Miers "would not get a majority either in the Judiciary Committee or the floor" and that her confirmation hearings would cause her to gather either support or opposition in a way that had not been seen by any other nominee in recent memory.

In May 2009, he told reporters the confirmation process for Obama Supreme Court nominee Sonia Sotomayor would be "more of a test of the Republican Party than it is of Judge Sotomayor", calling Sotomayor a "mainstream justice" whom Republicans had no reason to oppose.

In March 2016, after Obama nominated Merrick Garland to replace the deceased Antonin Scalia, Schumer called for Mitch McConnell and Chuck Grassley to hold hearings "so America can make its own judgment as to whether Merrick Garland belongs on the court". In July 2018, it was reported Schumer had advocated that Trump nominate Garland as a way to attract bipartisan support, as opposed to nominating someone opposed to the Affordable Care Act and Roe v. Wade who would be more controversial. In November 2016, Schumer said the Democrats would "go at" President-elect Trump if he did not nominate Supreme Court justices who were mainstream and the Republicans did not have "clean hands" for having blocked the Garland nomination for months.

In March 2017, at the end of Senate hearings for Trump Supreme Court nominee Neil Gorsuch, Schumer said he would vote against confirmation and called on Democrats to join him in blocking an up-or-down vote on Gorsuch. In his floor speech, Schumer said, "If this nominee cannot earn 60 votes—a bar met by each of President Obama's nominees and George Bush's last two nominees—the answer isn't to change the rules. It's to change the nominee." The Democrats conducted the filibuster, but Republicans broke it using the "nuclear option", and Gorsuch was confirmed the next day.

In July 2018, after Trump nominated Brett Kavanaugh to replace the retiring Anthony Kennedy, Schumer said Kavanaugh should be asked direct questions about the precedent set by Roe v. Wade and other cases. Schumer noted Kavanaugh's expressed opinion on the possible incorrect decision in United States v. Nixon and that this could mean he would not hold Trump accountable as a justice.

On August 21, Schumer said he was requesting that documents from Kavanaugh's White House tenure be shared with the Senate, arguing that "withholding documents from the Senate and the American people under the bogus label of committee confidential is a dark development for the Senate." After meeting with Kavanaugh, Schumer said he had asked him whether he believed Roe v. Wade and Casey v. Planned Parenthood were properly decided and that Kavanaugh had not responded and the lack of an answer "should send shivers down the spine of any American who believes in reproductive freedom for women". He also said Kavanaugh had a special obligation to make his views clear due to his unique position as the only person nominated to the Supreme Court by a president who said, "I will only nominate someone who overturns Roe v Wade." Schumer subsequently called on the Senate Judiciary Committee to delay Kavanaugh's confirmation hearing after former Trump lawyer Michael Cohen plead guilty to charges of bank fraud, tax fraud and campaign finance law violations, calling the plea "a game changer".

==== 2020 comments about Brett Kavanaugh and Neil Gorsuch ====
In March 2020, Schumer was criticized for statements he made about Supreme Court justices Neil Gorsuch and Brett Kavanaugh, both of whom were nominated by Trump. At a rally outside the United States Capitol while the Supreme Court was hearing an abortion-related case, Schumer said that if Kavanaugh and Gorsuch voted against abortion rights, they would have "unleashed a whirlwind" (echoing Kavanaugh's own comments during his 2018 confirmation hearings) and would "pay the price". He then said, "You won't know what hit you if you go forward with these awful decisions." Republicans and Democrats, as well as Chief Justice John Roberts, condemned these comments as inciting violence. Senator Josh Hawley called for a censure. A spokesman for Schumer said the comments were in reference to the political price Senate Republicans would pay, and criticized Roberts for following a "right-wing" attack to misinterpret the comments. Schumer later apologized for the comments.

In February 2025, interim U.S. Attorney for Washington D.C. Ed Martin announced the Department of Justice was launching an investigation into the matter.

=== Committee assignments ===
- Committee on Rules and Administration
- Select Committee on Intelligence (ex officio as Minority Leader)
- Joint Congressional Committee on Inaugural Ceremonies (2024)

=== Caucus memberships ===
- Afterschool Caucuses
- Congressional NextGen 9-1-1 Caucus
- Senate Taiwan Caucus

== Policy work and political positions ==
=== Abortion ===
Schumer is pro-choice, and has a 100% rating from NARAL Pro-Choice America.

In 2002, Schumer authored a provision to an industry-sponsored bill intended to make it harder for people to erase their debts by filing for bankruptcy. Anti-abortion activists opposed the measure, claiming it restricted their ability to use bankruptcy courts to write off court fines. After the bill appeared to die in May, John Feehery, spokesman for Republican J. Dennis Hastert, said, "Schumer really was pretty obnoxious about how this provision was going to hurt people who were pro-life and that really got some of our folks ginned up." In response, Schumer said the provision was a compromise with Henry Hyde and other colleagues and it was opposed by people who did not properly read the law.

After Supreme Court Justice Anthony Kennedy retired in 2018, Schumer voiced concern about Trump's choice of replacement, believing they would try to overturn Roe v. Wade.

=== Agriculture ===
In March 2019, Schumer was one of 38 senators to sign a letter to Sonny Perdue, the U.S. Secretary of Agriculture, warning that dairy farmers "have continued to face market instability and are struggling to survive the fourth year of sustained low prices" and urging his department to "strongly encourage these farmers to consider the Dairy Margin Coverage program".

=== Bush administration judicial nominations ===
In January 2004, after President Bush renominated Charles Pickering to the federal appeals court along with 30 other nominees who had failed to win confirmation under the previous Democratic-controlled Senate, Schumer stated his intent to prevent Pickering's confirmation and said the US could do better.

In 2007, after Bush nominated former federal judge Michael Mukasey to become attorney general of the United States (replacing Gonzales, who had resigned), Schumer expressed support for Mukasey. Despite appearing troubled by Mukasey's refusal to declare in public that waterboarding was illegal torture, Schumer announced on November 2 that he would vote to confirm Mukasey. He said Mukasey had assured him in a private meeting that he would enforce any law declaring waterboarding illegal, and that Mukasey had told him Bush would have "no legal authority" to ignore such a law.

=== Cannabis ===
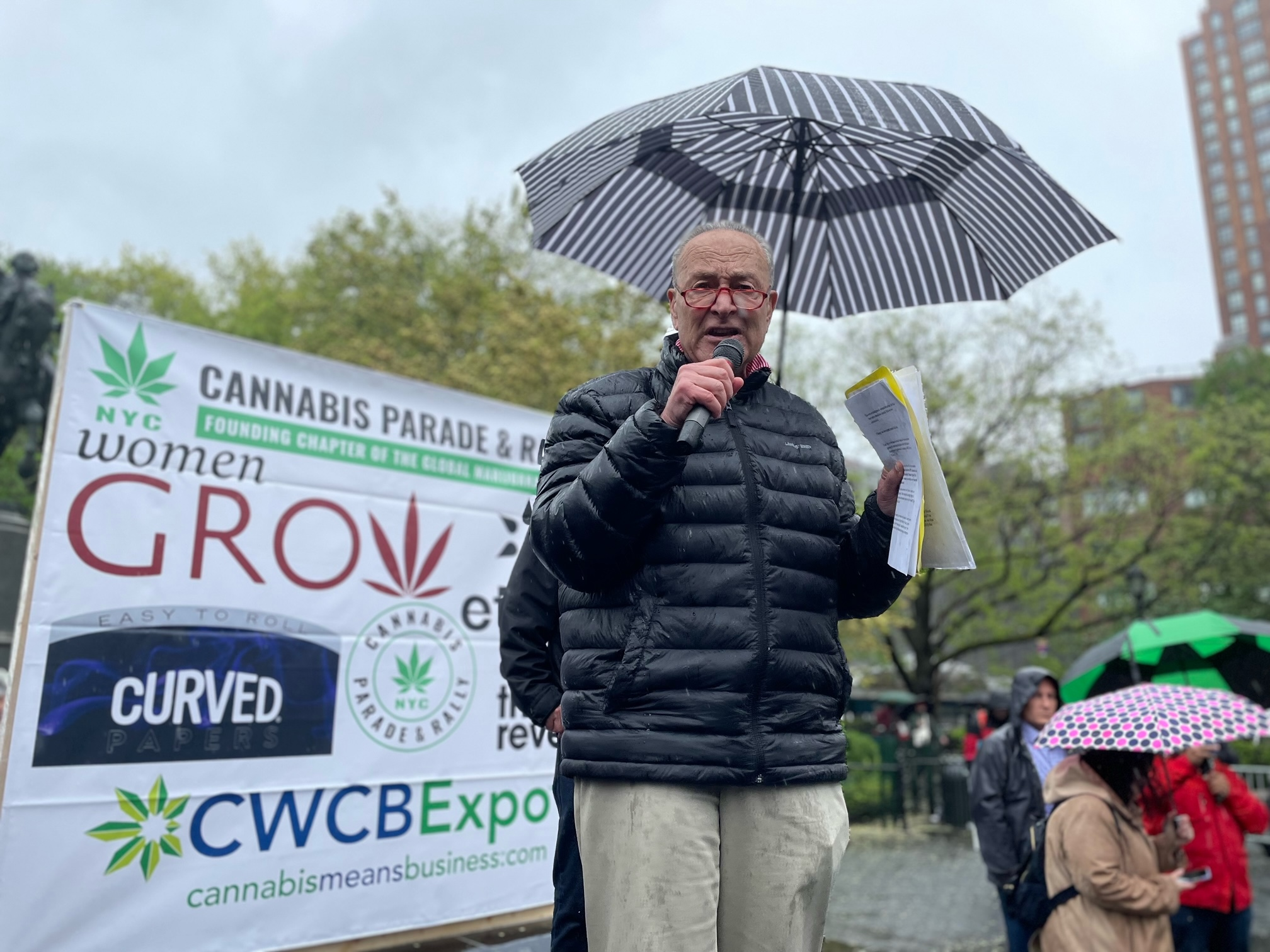
Schumer speaking at the NYC Cannabis Parade & Rally in 2022

In April 2018, Schumer said that he would back efforts to decriminalize cannabis at the federal level. On April 20, a day known as 4/20, he announced his sponsorship of legislation to remove cannabis from the Controlled Substances Act. The bill would also provide funding for women and minority-owned businesses and for research into the public health effects of cannabis. On June 27, 2018, Schumer formally introduced the Marijuana Freedom and Opportunity Act.

On July 14, 2021, Schumer, along with senators Ron Wyden and Cory Booker, released for public comment a comprehensive federal legalization bill known as the Cannabis Administration and Opportunity Act. On July 21, 2022, he formally introduced the bill.

=== Clinton impeachment ===
Schumer voted against the impeachment charges of President Bill Clinton in both houses of Congress. Schumer was a member of the House of Representatives (and Judiciary Committee member) during a December 1998 lame-duck session of Congress, voting "no" on all counts in committee and on the floor of the House. In January 1999, Schumer, as a newly elected member of the Senate, also voted "not guilty" on the two impeachment charges.

=== Consumer issues ===
In 1989, Schumer passed legislation that required uniform disclosure information on the back of credit card applications, notifying prospective cardholders of annual fees and interest rates. This standardized information is now known as the "Schumer box". Schumer has also aggressively pushed to end the practice whereby customers can be charged two ATM fees, one by their own bank and one by the bank that owns the ATM, if the ATM is outside their bank's network.

With Representative Nita Lowey, Schumer has been working to ban the chemical bisphenol A (BPA), often found in baby bottles and plastic children's food containers. The Canadian government has already banned BPA in baby bottles and children's products. Schumer is also seeking a ban on the use of cadmium, a carcinogen known to impair brain development in children, in toys and children's jewelry. When companies began selling gloves, pills, inhalers, diuretics, shampoos and other products during the 2009 swine flu scare, Schumer urged the Federal Trade Commission (FTC) to open an investigation. In the end, the FTC put ten companies on notice and identified a total of 140 scams.

Schumer has championed college tuition tax credits, calling for and passing a $4,000 tuition tax credit for students as part of a host of tax credits and cuts passed to stimulate the economy in the 2009 American Reinvestment and Recovery Act.

Schumer received an "A" grade on the 2008 Drum Major Institute's Congressional Scorecard on middle-class issues.

In October 2013, Schumer announced his support for a proposal ending restrictions on shipping beer, wine, and spirits through the United States Postal Service, saying it would "help keep local post offices open by bringing in an estimated $225 million in new revenues to the USPS" and broaden the availability of beers and wines to consumers.

=== Death penalty ===
In 2013, Schumer said the death penalty would be "appropriate" in the case of Dzhokhar Tsarnaev, the perpetrator of the Boston Marathon bombing. "The federal law allows the death penalty. ... I wrote the law in 1994 when I was head of the crime subcommittee in the House. This is just the kind of case that it should be applied to."

=== Disaster relief ===
In 2014, Schumer was recognized for helping to achieve the award of $700,000 in compensation from the Federal Emergency Management Agency (FEMA) for Gowanda, New York, as a result of the devastating flood there in 2009. A flash flood devastated the village, causing two deaths. Four feet of flood waters swept through the village, and caused much damage. Gowanda was declared both a state and federal disaster site.

Of the anticipated disbursement of FEMA monies to Gowanda, Schumer said:

FEMA and the state were sitting on Gowanda's money for way too long. It's about time that they made the village of Gowanda whole for the damage done in this flood. I've been advocating for this for months and months and months; I'm glad everyone came together and finally did the right thing.

=== Donald Trump ===
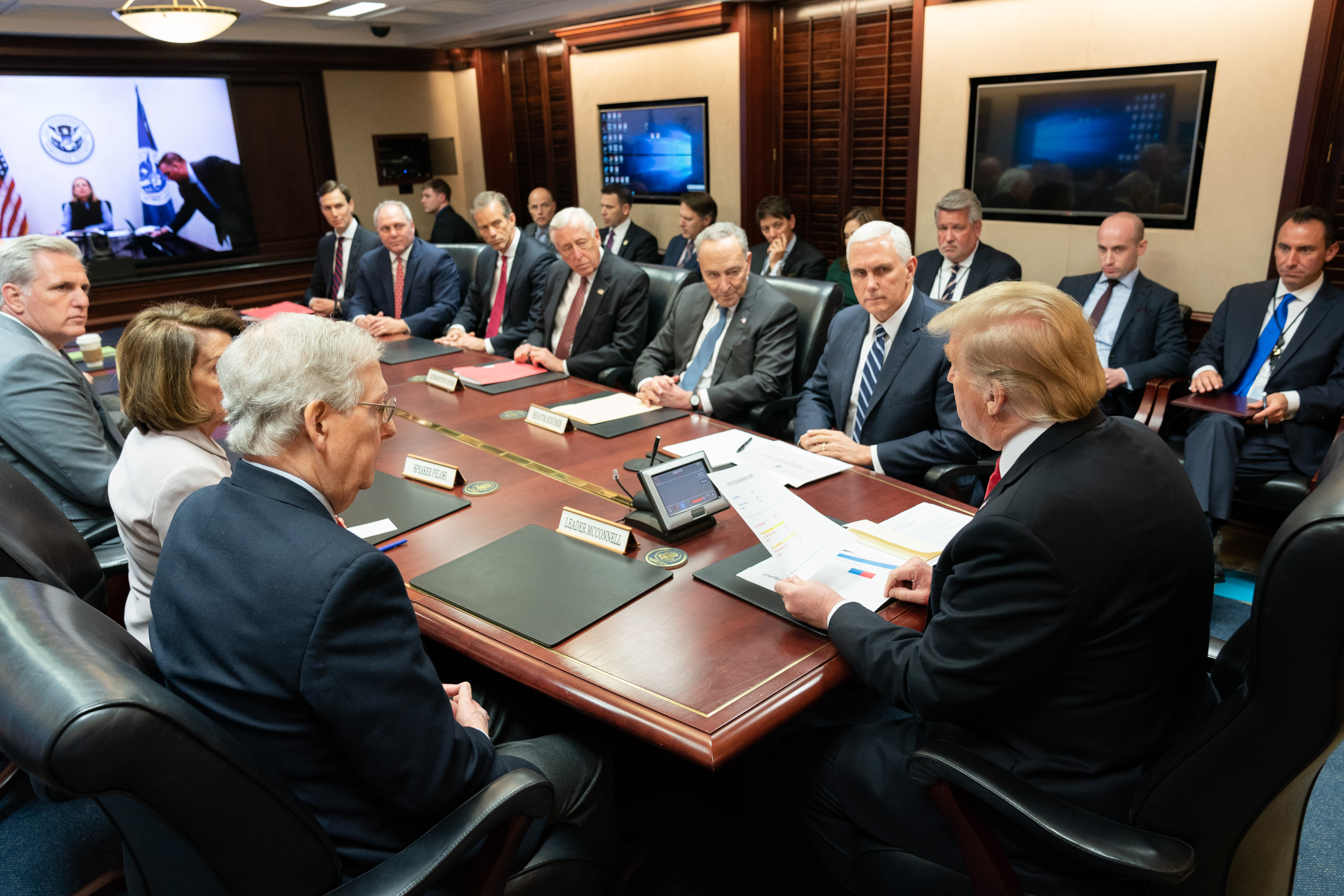
Schumer attending a congressional leadership meeting with Trump in the White House Situation Room on January 2, 2019

In a November 2016 interview conducted in the weeks after Trump's election to the presidency, Schumer said that he and Trump were not friends and had had "civil conversations a couple of times" when Trump had contacted him. Trump had said earlier that year that he believed he would get along with Schumer and that he was "close to Schumer in many ways". In December 2016, Schumer called on Trump cabinet nominees to release their tax returns and in doing so follow the precedent set by Steve Mnuchin and Tom Price.

In February 2017, before Trump's speech to a joint session of Congress, Schumer predicted that the speech would be less memorable than ones delivered by Trump's predecessors due to what he called "a yawning gap between what he says and what his administration actually does for working Americans". Though acknowledging Trump's populist campaigning style, Schumer said Trump "governs like a pro-corporate, pro-elite, hard-right ideologue".

In March 2017, Schumer released a statement calling on Trump to apologize for claiming the Obama administration had wiretapped him during his presidential campaign. He advocated that Trump stop tweeting to better focus on working on behalf of the United States and said Trump had "severely damaged his credibility" by promoting conspiracy theories.

In June 2018, Schumer delivered a Senate floor speech decrying Representative Maxine Waters's call to harass members of the Trump administration as protest of the administration's policies: "I strongly disagree with those who advocate harassing folks if they don't agree with you. If you disagree with a politician, organize your fellow citizens to action and vote them out of office. But no one should call for the harassment of political opponents. That's not right. That's not American."

In August 2018, in response to Trump's charge that American Jews who vote for Democrats are "disloyal", Schumer tweeted, "When he [Trump] uses a trope that's been used against the Jewish people for centuries with dire consequences, he is encouraging—wittingly or unwittingly—anti-Semites throughout the country and world."

Schumer was participating in the certification of the 2021 United States Electoral College vote count on January 6, 2021, when Trump supporters attacked the U.S. Capitol. Schumer and other members of Congress were removed from the Senate chambers. He and Mitch McConnell joined Nancy Pelosi and Steny Hoyer in an undisclosed location. As the attack persisted, Schumer and Pelosi released a joint statement calling on Trump to demand the rioters leave the Capitol and its grounds immediately. When the Senate reconvened after the Capitol was secure, Schumer gave remarks, calling it a day "that will live forever in infamy". Later that day, he blamed Trump for the attack, calling on Vice President Mike Pence to invoke the Twenty-fifth Amendment to the United States Constitution to remove Trump from office. He also said he would support impeachment.

=== Drugs ===
In May 2001, Schumer and Senator John McCain introduced legislation intended to make it more difficult for makers of brand-name drugs to keep cheaper generic drugs off the market. A coalition of consumer groups supported the legislation and Schumer told reporters its enactment would reduce prescription drug costs by over 60% per prescription in addition to saving consumers $71 billion over the next decade.

In October 2001, during a press conference, Schumer stated his desire that generic ciprofloxacin be available for government use. At that time, Bayer held exclusive patent rights for its commercial product, Cipro. Schumer also said he believed the federal government had the authority to order the immediate production of generic ciproflaxin to expand the government stockpile of the drug.

In July 2002, the Senate passed a bill sponsored by Schumer and McCain that could lower the costs of generic drugs more rapidly available to U.S. consumers and thereby lead to savings of billions of dollars in drug costs. The legislation also attempted to prevent frivolous lawsuits by brand-name drug manufacturers claiming generic drugs infringed their patents. An identical bill was introduced in the House but did not pass.

=== Election reform ===
In March 2002, as the Senate worked on a compromise to save an election reform bill that stalled due to Republicans' believing it was not combative enough against voter fraud, Schumer and Senator Ron Wyden led a successful effort in protecting an amendment allowing first-time voters to be verified with only a signature.

=== Equal pay ===
In April 2014, the United States Senate debated the Paycheck Fairness Act (S. 2199; 113th Congress), a bill aimed at addressing the gender pay gap in the United States. Republicans argued that the Democrats were attempting to use the votes on this bill and the issue of equal pay as political issues in the 2014 midterm elections. Schumer backed the measure and told reporters, "pay equity, that's women, that's 53 percent of the vote".

=== FBI ===
In November 2001, Schumer joined fellow New York senator Hillary Clinton to call for legislation encouraging the Federal Bureau of Investigation to share information on terrorism with local and state police by removing legal barriers to such cooperation, citing reports by New York mayor Rudy Giuliani that federal authorities did not tell city police what they were aware of. Schumer joined Patrick Leahy to report that the Justice Department supported the legislation.

In October 2016, after FBI director James Comey announced the reopening of an investigation into whether Hillary Clinton, then the Democratic presidential nominee, mishandled classified emails during her tenure at the State Department, Schumer said he had lost confidence in Comey. In May 2017, after President Donald Trump fired Comey, Schumer told reporters they were aware the FBI had been investigating whether the Trump campaign had colluded with Russia and pondered whether the investigation was "getting too close to home for the president". In a Senate floor speech, Schumer called for an "impartial and independent" investigation into Russian interference in the 2016 presidential election, announcing the Democrats had agreed that Deputy Attorney General Rod Rosenstein would not be able to appoint a special prosecutor for an investigation into Russia's meddling; that Comey meet with the Senate; and that Rosenstein and Attorney General Jeff Sessions meet separately with senators.

In January 2018, Schumer said that since Mueller's investigation began, the United States "has had to endure conspiracy after conspiracy from the right wing, Republican congressmen, senators and of course the right-wing press, which acts in total cahoots" in regard to their views on the FBI, and that the Republicans' effort to discredit Mueller "has now devolved into delusional, self-serving paranoia". In May, after the White House invited two Republicans and no Democrats to a briefing by Department of Justice officials on an FBI informant who made contact with the Trump campaign, Schumer and House minority leader Nancy Pelosi sent a letter to Deputy Attorney General Rod Rosenstein and FBI director Christopher A. Wray calling for "a bipartisan Gang of Eight briefing that involves congressional leadership from both chambers".

=== Financial industry regulation ===
In 1987, then-Representative Schumer wrote a New York Times op-ed opposing repeal of the Glass–Steagall Act of 1933, titled "Don't Let Banks Become Casinos". In 1999, Schumer supported Congress's repeal of Glass–Steagall, saying: "There are many reasons for this bill, but first and foremost is to ensure that U.S. financial firms remain competitive." Since 2010, the securities and investment industry has been the largest donor to Schumer's senatorial campaigns.

According to a December 14, 2008, article in The New York Times Schumer had "embraced the [financial] industry's free-market, deregulatory agenda more than almost any other Democrat in Congress, even backing some measures now blamed for contributing to the financial crisis." A review of his record showed that he took steps to protect the investment banking industry from government oversight and tougher rules. Over the years, he helped financial institutions avoid billions of dollars in taxes or fees, succeeded in limiting efforts to reform and regulate credit-rating agencies the George W. Bush administration and the SEC had proposed, and passed legislation that cut fees paid by Wall Street firms to the SEC in half, or by $14 billion, over a decade.

The Charles Schumer-Rob Portman Senate bill of 2015 proposed to tax the $2.2 trillion multinational corporations are holding outside the country in tax-haven subsidiaries, on which 35% was already owed, as a one-time tax "at a rate significantly lower than the statutory corporate rate".

In his book released in March 2010, No One Would Listen, Bernie Madoff whistleblower Harry Markopolos passed along an unsourced claim that Schumer called the SEC for information about the Madoff investigation. Schumer denied this.

In 2019, in response to The American Prospect's Day One Agenda, Schumer announced a new stance on eliminating student debt. In November 2020, he said, "I have a proposal with Elizabeth Warren that the first $50,000 of debt be vanquished, and we believe that Joe Biden can do that with the pen as opposed to legislation".

=== Foreign policy ===
In 2009, Schumer criticized Scotland's release of convicted Pan Am Flight 103 bomber Abdelbaset al-Megrahi and called for the United States to impose economic sanctions on the United Kingdom if Megrahi's release was tied to a massive oil deal between the United Kingdom and Libya.

In April 2017, after the Shayrat missile strike, Schumer said a "pinpointed, limited action to punish and hopefully deter Assad from doing this again is appropriate" while warning against the United States becoming further involved in Syria.

In July 2017, Schumer voted for the Countering America's Adversaries Through Sanctions Act, which grouped together sanctions against Iran, Russia, and North Korea. The act passed the Senate 98–2.

In July 2018, after Trump criticized Germany's decision to approve a new Russian-German gas pipeline under the Baltic Sea, bypassing Poland and Ukraine, Schumer and House Minority Leader Nancy Pelosi released a joint statement condemning Trump's comments as an embarrassment and his behavior as "another profoundly disturbing signal that the President is more loyal to President Putin than to our NATO allies".

In October 2020, Schumer called on the Trump administration to immediately suspend U.S. military aid to Azerbaijan, sent through the Pentagon's "building partner assistance program". According to critics, the aid could be used in the Nagorno-Karabakh conflict between Azerbaijan and Armenia. He co-signed a letter stating:

We have been very critical of U.S. security assistance to Azerbaijan given the country's human rights record and aggression in the region. Earlier this year, at Senator Menendez's request, the Government Accountability Office agreed to conduct a review of security assistance to the country to ensure that it aligns with U.S. interests; this violence indicates that it does not.

On April 27, 2025, Schumer strongly criticized Trump's 28-point plan to end the Russo-Ukrainian war, saying the plan was completely in Putin's favor and that it meant surrender for Ukraine. He also said he would support the Ukrainian people until Ukraine won.

==== Afghanistan ====
In March 2006, the House Appropriations Committee voted to block a deal allowing Dubai Ports World to operate some terminals at U.S. ports, via an amendment that was inserted into an emergency supplemental funding bill for military actions in Iraq and Afghanistan. The same day, in the Senate, Schumer introduced an amendment barring a company from operating in a U.S. port if the company was owned by a country that recognized the Taliban's regime in Afghanistan, the amendment being touted as similar to the House measure. Senate majority leader Bill Frist subsequently asked for a quorum call that effectively gnarled proceedings, Schumer afterward opining that the Democrats had "bent over backwards to try and accommodate the Republican schedule" and that Frist's move meant Republicans did not want a vote at all.

In October 2009, Schumer said, "It cost us $6 trillion and 4,500 lives, approximately, to bring stability to Iraq. Just in terms of the loss of life and treasure, do we want to do the same exercise in Afghanistan?" He said the United States could potentially be able to keep itself safe without bringing stability to Afghanistan and advocated that American forces be scaled back in Afghanistan in favor of more reliance on unmanned drone attacks.

In April 2017, Schumer called for caution in Afghanistan, noting the casualties in Iraq, and said the military would have to come to Congress if it wanted more American soldiers in Afghanistan.

==== China ====
In 2006, NPR reported that Schumer and Senator Lindsey Graham were highly critical of the trade imbalance between the U.S. and China, and its alleged cause of Chinese currency intervention.

In 2017, Schumer wrote to Trump advocating for a block on China that would prevent it from purchasing more American companies to increase pressure on Beijing to help rein in North Korea's nuclear missile program. In May 2018, after Trump signaled his willingness to ease sanctions on ZTE in a bid for a trade deal with Beijing, Schumer observed, "This seems to be an area where Democrats and Republicans in the House and the Senate are coming together and telling the president, you've got to be tough on China, you have to have your actions match your rhetoric."

Before the Trump administration took concrete measures against China in late March 2018, Schumer and other Democratic leaders pressed Trump to focus more on China. Schumer said, "China has stolen millions of jobs and trillions of dollars [but] administrations from both parties haven't been strong enough to fight back."

In October 2023, Schumer led a bipartisan congressional delegation's visit to China that included a meeting with Chinese president Xi Jinping. In a press conference, Schumer said the two sides spoke about their "respective priorities" and that he told Xi that "America wants fairness and stability. At the foundation of the relationship must be a level playing field for American businesses and workers, as well as responsible competition". The delegation also met Foreign Minister Wang Yi, National People's Congress Standing Committee chairman Zhao Leji, and Shanghai Communist Party Secretary Chen Jining.

==== Iran nuclear deal ====
On August 6, 2015, Schumer announced his opposition to the nuclear deal with Iran, the JCPOA. He planned to tell the White House, then his Senate colleagues, and then the public, but the White House leaked the news during the Republican debate in what CBS News described as an "apparent attempt to limit coverage". Arms control expert Jeffrey Lewis derided Schumer's decision, noting that Schumer was making factually incorrect claims about the amount of time in which the treaty would allow inspection of Iranian nuclear facilities. In what The Guardian described as a "shot across Schumer's bow", White House Press Secretary Josh Earnest said that fellow Democrats might remember Schumer's decision when deciding whom to elect as their next majority leader.

==== Iraq ====
Schumer was a supporter of the Iraq War Resolution but was very critical of President George W. Bush's strategy in the Iraq War; he suggested that a commission of ex-generals be appointed to review it.

In April 2002, during a Senate speech, Schumer called the Bush administration's Middle East policy "muddled, confused and inconsistent" and said the planned meeting between Secretary of State Colin Powell and Yasser Arafat would contradict Bush's stated stand against terrorists and those harboring them. Nat Hentoff of the Village Voice wrote in November 2006 that "the loquacious Schumer has been indifferent to the administration's war on the Constitution and on our laws and treaties", particularly on the issue of torture.

In July 2006, Prime Minister of Iraq Nouri al-Maliki stated that Iraq was urging the international community "to take a quick and firm stance to stop this aggression against Lebanon, to stop the killing of innocent people and to stop the destruction of infrastructure". In response, Schumer, Harry Reid, and Dick Durbin signed a letter to al-Maliki in which they charged him with failing to condemn the aggression of Hezbollah as well as Israel's right to defend itself, arguing the oversight raised serious concern about whether Iraq under his rule could "play a constructive role in resolving the current crisis and bringing stability to the Middle East".

Schumer was the first senator to call for U.S. support for Kurdish independence after the 2017 Kurdistan Region independence referendum, releasing a resolution calling for the U.S. government to change its policy to "support a political process that addresses the aspirations of the Kurds for an independent state". He called upon Iraq to "engage in a dialogue and peacefully determine the best way to accommodate the well-deserved and legitimate aspirations of the Iraqi Kurds".

==== Israel and Palestine ====
Schumer has called himself "Shomer Yisrael" or "Guardian of Israel", an epithet he has used for years, calling it one of his "roles" in the Senate that he will continue to play "with every bone in my body". This self-characterization has been repeatedly questioned, such as after his March 2024 Senate floor speech in which he criticized Israeli leadership and called for Israel to initiate early elections during the Gaza war.

In 1994, Schumer joined the Anti-Defamation League and the American Jewish Congress in a campaign to get the IRS to revoke the tax-exempt status of the Palestinian-American charity the Holy Land Foundation, which at the time it was shut down in 2001 was the country's largest Muslim charity.

In June 2010, while speaking at an Orthodox Union event in Washington D.C., Schumer made comments about Israel's blockade of the Gaza Strip that were later criticized. He said that statistics show that the Palestinian citizens of the West Bank were experiencing "economic prosperity", crediting this to their government's cooperation with the Israeli government on combating terrorists. He then criticized the Palestinian citizens of the Gaza Strip for voting for the Hamas militant organization, calling on Israel to "strangle them economically until they see that's not the way to go", while also stating that Israel should continue providing "humanitarian aid" to Palestinian civilians. He argued that the Israeli blockade of the Gaza Strip is justified not only because it keeps weapons out of the Palestinian territory, but also because it shows Palestinians living there that "when there's some moderation and cooperation, they can have an economic advancement." Schumer added, "The Palestinian people still don't believe in a Jewish state, in a two-state solution. More do than before, but a majority still do not ... They don't believe in the Torah. They don't believe in King David. So they don't think it's our land".

Schumer supported Israel in the 2014 Israel–Gaza conflict. In March 2018, he told AIPAC's delegates that Israeli settlements in the Israeli-occupied West Bank, including East Jerusalem, have nothing to do with the Israeli–Palestinian conflict.

Schumer is a co-sponsor of a Senate resolution expressing objection to the UN Security Council Resolution 2334, which condemned Israeli settlement-building in the occupied Palestinian territories as a violation of international law. He criticized Obama, saying: "past administrations—both Democrat and Republican—have protected Israel from the vagaries of this biased institution [the U.N.]. Unfortunately, by abstaining on United Nations Resolution 2334, this administration has not followed in that path."

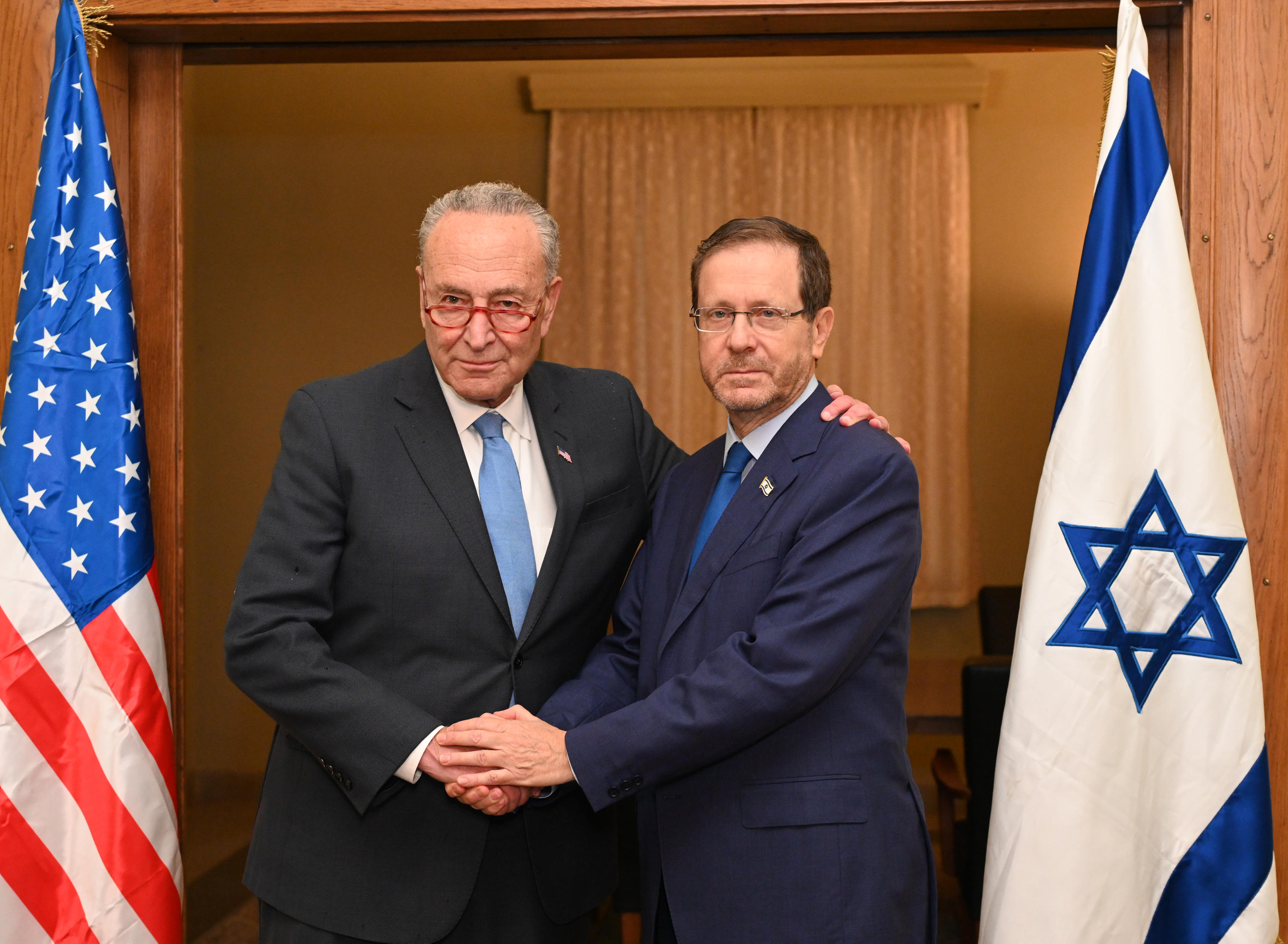
Schumer and Israeli president Isaac Herzog in Tel Aviv during the Gaza war on October 15, 2023

In May 2017, Schumer co-sponsored the Israel Anti-Boycott Act, Senate Bill 720, which would make it a federal crime, punishable by a maximum sentence of 20 years imprisonment, for Americans to encourage or participate in boycotts against Israel and Israeli settlements in the occupied Palestinian territories if protesting actions by the Israeli government. The bill would also make it legal for U.S. states to refuse to do business with contractors that engage in boycotts against Israel.

That June, Schumer introduced a Senate resolution celebrating the 50th anniversary of the Israeli annexation of East Jerusalem.

In May 2018, Schumer praised Trump for moving the U.S. embassy to Jerusalem, saying, "I sponsored legislation to do this two decades ago, and I applaud President Trump for doing it." He had previously accused Trump of "indecisiveness" for his delays in implementing the move by waiving the Jerusalem Embassy Act of 1995, as previous presidents had done.

In a March 14, 2024, Senate speech, Schumer said Israeli prime minister Netanyahu was an impediment to peace in the Middle East and called for elections to replace him when the Gaza war abated. Schumer said the many civilian deaths in Gaza were causing international support for Israel to fall to historic lows. Netanyahu responded by arranging to address a Senate GOP conference by video.

In a March 2025 interview with Bret Stephens, Schumer said, "My job is to keep the left pro-Israel." He said that his Democratic caucus remains "overwhelmingly pro-Israel" and pointed out that during a Senate vote on the largest aid package to Israel in history in 2024, only three Democrats opposed it, including Bernie Sanders. Schumer warned that "the greatest danger to Israel, long-term" is if they lose the support of the United States' liberal half. Recalling a past conversation with Netanyahu, Schumer said he advised him to appear on progressive platforms like The Rachel Maddow Show rather than only conservative ones like The Sean Hannity Show, advice Netanyahu ignored. Schumer later called for new elections in Israel during a Senate speech, a move he said he was "fiercely proud" of, as he said it signaled to Democrats that one can oppose Netanyahu while supporting Israel. Schumer also drew attention to right-wing antisemitism, saying that just as some anti-Israel demonstrators on the left use "Zionist" as a substitute for "Jew", elements on the right employ coded antisemitic language such as "neocons" or "globalists". Of a remark by Trump questioning his Jewish identity, Schumer said, "There's a long and dark history of non-Jewish people trying to decide who gets to be Jewish" and urged Trump to "spend less time trafficking in bigotry and focus more on rooting the antisemites out of his administration". Schumer warned of a "pincer" movement—antisemitism emerging from both the extreme left and the extreme right that could align in "strange and dangerous ways". He compared the situation to those of France during the Dreyfus affair and Germany in the leadup to the Third Reich. While insisting that his outlook stems from "nervousness rather than pessimism", Schumer also pointed to the enduring strength of American values, saying, "the roots of America's warmth toward Jews run deep". But he cautioned, quoting Irish diplomat Conor Cruise O'Brien, that "antisemitism is a light sleeper".

Schumer did not endorse Zohran Mamdani, the Democratic nominee in the 2025 New York City mayoral election, citing his criticism of Israel.

In a February 1, 2026, address to a UJA-Federation of New York gathering, Schumer said that one of his many jobs as Senate Democratic leader was to "fight for aid to Israel, all the aid that Israel needs" and pledged he would "always fight to give Israel what it needs to protect itself from the many who want to wipe Israel off the face of the map", adding: "We delivered more security assistance to Israel, our ally, under my leadership than ever, ever before. We will keep doing that." House Democratic leader Hakeem Jeffries also spoke at the event and also pledged support to Israel.

During the 2026 Democratic Senate primary in Michigan, Schumer publicly endorsed Haley Stevens against Abdul El-Sayed and asked donors to support her. Stevens, who is staunchly pro-Israel, raised a record $62 million in contributions, approximately half of which came from AIPAC and its affiliates, but lost to El-Sayed, an outspoken critic of Israel and its ongoing genocide in Gaza. Schumer endorsed El-Sayed in the general election.

In April 2026, Schumer was one of seven Democratic senators to join all Republicans in opposing a pair of resolutions that would have blocked the sale of bulldozers and 12,000 one-thousand-pound bombs to Israel.

==== North Korea ====
In February 2017, Schumer said that North Korea had proved itself to be "an irresponsible nation in every way" and that China could be used to curtail North Korea as most of North Korea's imports and exports go through China. He advocated that the United States tell China "they have to put the wood to North Korea in a much more serious way than they have done so far." In August, after Trump said North Korea would be "met with fire and fury like the world has never seen" in the event of continued threats against the United States, Schumer released a statement advocating that the United States be "firm and deliberate with North Korea, but reckless rhetoric is not a strategy to keep America safe."

In May 2018, Schumer called for Kim Jong-un to be removed from the commemorative coin memorializing the 2018 North Korea–United States summit, calling Kim a "brutal dictator" and offering the Peace House as a more appropriate alternative. In June, Schumer was one of seven senior Democratic senators to sign a letter to Trump outlining the conditions of their caucus's support for any deal resulting from the North Korea-US summit. After Kim and Trump issued a joint statement, Schumer said the meeting between the two had given "a brutal and repressive dictatorship the international legitimacy it has long craved" and that the agreement lacked details on achieving a pathway to the Korean peninsula being denuclearized, how the United States would verify North Korea's disarming, and an assurance of cessation for enrichment of plutonium and uranium from North Korea. In a speech on the Senate floor, Schumer questioned what the United States had gained from the summit and added that the country had "won far stronger language on denuclearization" in previous agreements with North Korea. In response, Trump tweeted,

Thank you Chuck, but are you sure you got that right? No more nuclear testing or rockets flying all over the place, blew up launch sites. Hostages already back, hero remains coming home & much more!

==== Russia ====
In a June 3, 2008, Wall Street Journal op-ed, Schumer wrote that cooperative economic sanctions from the U.S., Britain, France, Germany, Russia and China could topple Iran's theocratic government. In discussing the importance of Russia's cooperation, Schumer wrote, "Mr. Putin is an old-fashioned nationalist who seeks to regain the power and greatness Russia had before the fall of the Soviet Union." He added, "The anti-missile system strengthens the relationship between Eastern Europe and NATO, with real troops and equipment on the ground. It mocks Mr. Putin's dream of eventually restoring Russian hegemony over Eastern Europe." On June 10, the East European Coalition sent Schumer a letter about his article, writing, "As a supporter of democracy for the nations of Eastern Europe, which suffered greatly under 'Russian hegemony over Eastern Europe', your suggestion that these nations be used as bargaining chips in order to appease Russia is troubling, inexplicable and unacceptable."

In August 2013, after Russia granted asylum to Edward Snowden, Schumer said Putin was behaving like a "schoolyard bully", adding, "The relationship between the United States and Russia is more poisonous than any time since the Cold War because of all of this."

In December 2016, Schumer joined John McCain, Lindsey Graham, and Jack Reed in a letter to Majority Leader McConnell urging the formation of a Senate select committee on cyber. Schumer said the panel would focus on Russian meddling and potential threats from other countries such as China and Iran.

In December 2016, Schumer demanded a congressional inquiry into Russian meddling in U.S. affairs. In January 2017, in response to those questioning the U.S. intelligence community over its assessments, he said, "Let me tell you, you take on the intelligence community, they have six ways from Sunday at getting back at you". Later that month, he introduced legislation to limit executive action on Russian sanctions.

In a May 2017 Senate floor speech, Schumer called on the White House to release unedited transcripts of the meeting between Trump and Russian officials the previous week, saying the continued confidentiality would ensure "the American people will rightly doubt if their president can handle our nation's most closely kept secrets." In July, Schumer disavowed claims that the Democratic Party considered Russia its top priority and named health care and economic stability for working-class families as its primary concerns. "Obviously Russia is in the news. Obviously we want Bob Mueller to be able to pursue and our committees to be able to pursue their investigations unimpeded."

Schumer spearheaded a non-binding resolution in July 2018 "warning President Trump not to let the Russian government question diplomats and other officials". The resolution stated the United States "should refuse to make available any current or former diplomat, civil servant, political appointee, law enforcement official or member of the Armed Forces of the United States for questioning by the government of Vladimir Putin". It passed 98–0.

=== Gun laws ===
In 1994, then-representative Schumer and Senator Dianne Feinstein authored the Assault Weapons Ban. Supporters of gun control legislation give Schumer much of the credit for passage of both the Assault Weapons Ban and the Brady Handgun Violence Prevention Act. The Assault Weapons Ban, which banned semi-automatic rifles, shotguns, and handguns with certain features, expired in September 2004 despite attempts by Schumer to extend it. He was one of 16 senators to vote against the Vitter Amendment, which prohibited the confiscation of legally owned firearms during a disaster.

While a target of gun rights organizations, Schumer has supported hunters, sponsoring legislation to provide millions in outdoor recreation grants to landowners who allow hunting and fishing on their private property. For these efforts, Field and Stream magazine honored Schumer in its "Hero Awards" in 2008. He supports tax deductions for hunters who donate venison and other game to feeding programs. In response to a question at a debate during his 2010 reelection campaign, Schumer denied having a handgun or a permit for one. He has produced a letter from the NYPD stating that neither he nor his wife, Iris Weinshall, has a handgun license from NYC. Schumer aide Brian Fallon said, "except for winning an NRA marksmanship award at age 14, the senator does not own a gun or have a license to carry one".

In February 2018, after the Stoneman Douglas High School shooting, Schumer was one of four Democratic senators to sign a letter to Trump asserting that were he "to endorse legislation to require a background check on every gun purchase, without other poison pill provisions attached, we could finally move much closer towards the comprehensive system that you called for after the Stoneman Douglas attack" and that there was no justification for allowing people denied firearms by federally licensed dealers to "simply visit a gun show or go online to purchase the same gun that they were denied at the store".

In January 2019, Schumer was one of 40 senators to introduce the Background Check Expansion Act, which would require background checks for either the sale or transfer of all firearms including all unlicensed sellers. Exceptions to the bill's background check requirement included transfers between members of law enforcement, loaning firearms for either hunting or sporting events on a temporary basis, providing firearms as gifts to members of one's immediate family, firearms transferred as part of an inheritance, or giving a firearm to another person temporarily for immediate self-defense.

=== Health care ===
In March 2004, Schumer, Jon Corzine, Ted Kennedy, and Frank Lautenberg signed a letter to President Bush urging him to instruct staff to avoid taking action against whistleblower Richard Foster after Foster spoke out on the subject of White House efforts intended to keep Congress unaware of alternative higher cost estimates for the new Medicare prescription drug program.

Schumer supported Obama's health reform legislation; he voted for the Affordable Care Act in December 2009 and for the Health Care and Education Reconciliation Act of 2010.

In 2009, Schumer proposed that any new government-run health insurance programs follow all the standards applicable to private insurance. He did this to "address fears that a public program would drive private insurers from the market". Schumer said he wanted "a level playing field for competition".

In May 2017, in response to an amendment by Fred Upton to the American Health Care Act, Schumer released a statement saying the amendment "leaves Americans with pre-existing conditions as vulnerable as they were before under this bill" and compared it to "administering cough medicine to someone with stage 4 cancer". After the Congressional Budget Office (CBO) showed the American Health Care Act would cause millions of Americans to lose health coverage, Schumer said, "Republicans in Washington and the president should read this report cover to cover, throw their bill in the trash can and begin working with Democrats on a real plan to lower costs for the American people." In June, Schumer sent McConnell a letter requesting that all senators meet to discuss the American Health Care Act, citing the need for both parties to "come together to find solutions to America's challenges". Later that month, Schumer estimated the bill had a 50% chance of passing the Senate and added that Democrats were doing everything they could to fight the measure, calling the legislation "devastating for the middle class".

=== Homeland security ===
In 1995, Schumer sponsored the Omnibus Counterterrorism Act of 1995 (H.R. 896) in the House of Representatives.

As a senator, Schumer has worked to secure homeland security funds for the New York State and New York City and provide resources to its first responders. He delivered over $20 billion to support New York's security and recovery efforts after the 9/11 terrorist attacks on New York City and worked to deliver $200 million in Homeland Security funds to protect New York City mass transit.

In November 2001, Schumer announced hearings on George W. Bush's decision to try terrorists in military tribunals amid Washington concerns that Bush would skip the American legal system in handling such cases. Schumer said the hearing's two goals were to ascertain whether Bush had the power to form a tribunal apart from an attempt at interacting with Congress and whether a military tribunal was the most efficient instrument.

In August 2004, after American officials leaked the arrest of Muhammad Naeem Noor Khan to reporters, Schumer said he was troubled by the decision to reveal Khan's identity, citing the fact that the public had learned little of Khan's role in providing the information that led Homeland Security Secretary Tom Ridge to announce a higher terror alert level.

Schumer supported continuing to fully fund the FIRE Grant program the Federal Emergency Management Agency administered. The program allows fire departments and first responders nationwide to apply for grant funding for major purchases that localities have difficulty providing, namely apparatus and emergency vehicles. When the Bush administration pushed a plan to reduce the program from $1 billion to just under $300 million, Schumer helped lead an effort with local firefighters to block the cuts.

In March 2018, Schumer said the bipartisan legislation sponsored by Bob Casey and Pat Toomey would assist the children of deceased first respondents afford college by increasing the availability of Pell grant funding.

In August 2018, Schumer announced that the Senate had passed $1 million in FY2019 funding for the national firefighter cancer registry as an amendment to the upcoming FY2019 Health and Human Services minibus appropriations bill. He said firefighters needed "first-rate medical care and treatment" for the work they did and the registry would help "researchers track, treat, and eventually prevent firefighters being stricken by cancer".

=== Immigration ===
While discussing an immigration bill on the Senate floor in 2010, Schumer likened Indian tech giant Infosys Technologies to a "chop shop". When his statement set off a wave of outrage in India, he acknowledged his characterization was incorrect. The remark was also called "outrageous" by U.S.-India Business Council head Ron Somers.

Schumer is one of the Gang of Eight, a bipartisan group of four Democratic and four Republican senators who wrote and sponsored a 2013 comprehensive immigration reform bill. At the time, Schumer was the chairman of the Immigration, Refugees, and Border Security subcommittee of the Senate Judiciary Committee. In June 2013, the immigration bill passed the Senate with a strong majority—68–32, with 14 Republicans joining all Democrats—but the House of Representatives under Speaker John Boehner refused to take up the bill, and the legislation died.

In April 2012, Schumer introduced SB 1070, a bill that would kill Arizona's anti-immigration law, and ones like it if the Supreme Court ruled in favor of the states. He backed his position, saying: "States like Arizona and Alabama will no longer be able to get away with saying they are simply 'helping the federal government' to enforce the law when they are really writing their own laws and knowingly deploying untrained officers with a mission of arresting anyone and everyone who might fit the preconceived profile of an illegal immigrant."

In January 2018, Schumer stated that any agreement on the status of Deferred Action for Childhood Arrivals before its March expiration would have to be included in the spending bill. Schumer offered Trump congressional approval of more than $20 billion for his border wall in exchange for protecting recipients of DACA. Trump declined the offer. A week later, Schumer announced that conversations on immigration and border security were resuming between the White House and himself. In a March CNN op-ed, Schumer wrote that Trump had stood in the way of progress on "compromise proposals that both sides should be proud of" and charged Trump and the White House with using Dreamers as "bargaining chips to push forward their anti-immigrant agenda". He called on Trump to change course and said Americans would be aware that he was behind the prevention of Congress from settling the matter. In June, before a planned meeting between Trump and House Republicans for discussions on the compromise immigration bill, Schumer warned that House moderates would lose credibility if they succumbed to pressure and enacted "the hard right's agenda".

=== IndyMac Bank controversy ===
On June 26, 2008, Schumer took the extraordinary step of publicly releasing letters he had written to regulators about IndyMac Bank, the country's seventh-largest savings and loan association and ninth-largest originator of mortgage loans, which he considered a severely troubled institution. Schumer wrote that he was "concerned that IndyMac's financial deterioration poses significant risks to both taxpayers and borrowers and that the regulatory community may not be prepared to take measures that would help prevent the collapse of IndyMac." Many IndyMac depositors either panicked or, from another perspective, justifiably acted and withdrew funds in the 11 days before IndyMac failed.

A Treasury Department's inspector general audit found that the primary causes of IndyMac's failure were associated with its business strategy of originating and securitizing Alt-A loans on a large scale. When home prices declined in the latter half of 2007 and the secondary mortgage market collapsed, IndyMac was forced to hold $10.7 billion of loans it could not sell in the secondary market. IndyMac's reduced liquidity was further exacerbated when account holders withdrew $1.55 billion in deposits in a "run" on the thrift after the public release of Schumer's letter. While the run was a contributing factor in the timing of IndyMac's demise, the underlying cause of the failure was the unsafe and unsound manner in which the thrift was operated.

Office of Thrift Supervision (OTS) director John Reich immediately blamed IndyMac's failure on the letter's release. Reich said Schumer gave the bank a "heart attack", saying, "Would the institution have failed without the deposit run? We'll never know the answer to that question." Reich and top deputies later resigned or were removed amid a Treasury Department audit and investigation revealing that Indymac had been allowed to backdate its financial reports.

Schumer conceded his actions might have caused some depositors to withdraw their money prematurely, but said, "if OTS had done its job as regulator and not let IndyMac's poor and loose lending practices continue, we wouldn't be where we are today. Instead of pointing false fingers of blame, OTS should start doing its job to prevent future IndyMacs." He added, "IndyMac was one of the most poorly run and reckless of all the banks ... It was a spinoff from the old Countrywide, and like Countrywide, it did all kinds of profligate activities that it never should have. Both IndyMac and Countrywide helped cause the housing crisis we're now in."

Despite IndyMac's condition before the failure, the financial media sharply criticized Schumer. CNBC financial analyst Jerry Bowyer charged that he was responsible for the "second largest bank failure in US history". While opining that IndyMac's failure was only a matter of time, banking consultant Bert Ely called Schumer's actions "wrong and irresponsible".

On October 18, 2008, The Wall Street Journal published an article suggesting that an investment company's interest in IndyMac might have prompted Schumer's letter. His reported close ties to the founders of OneWest Bank have long been of interest to many action groups. On December 22, 2008, The Washington Post reported that the OTS regional director in charge had been removed from his position for allowing IndyMac to falsify its financial reporting. The same day, conservative commentator Rush Limbaugh continued to blame Schumer and recast IndyMac's July bankruptcy as an "October surprise" planned by Democrats to help win the 2008 election.

=== Local issues ===
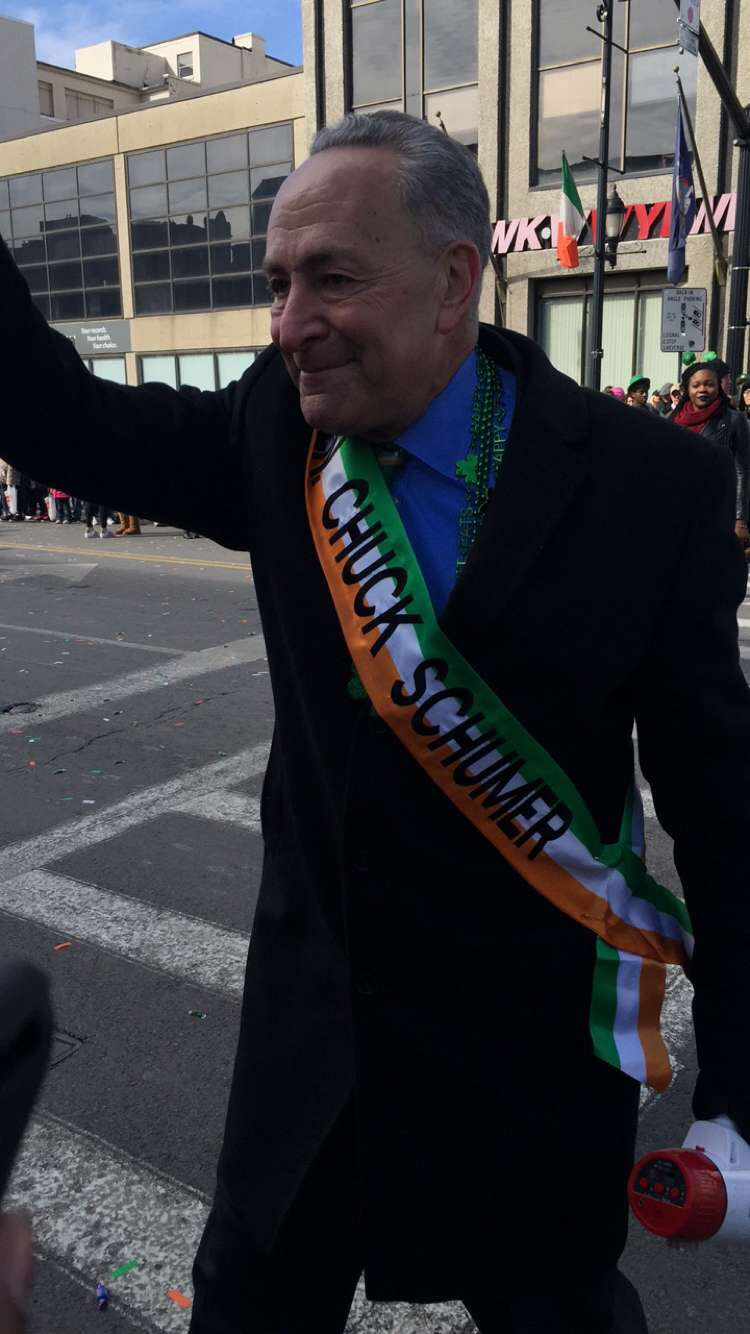
Schumer at the Binghamton St. Patrick's Day Parade on March 5, 2016

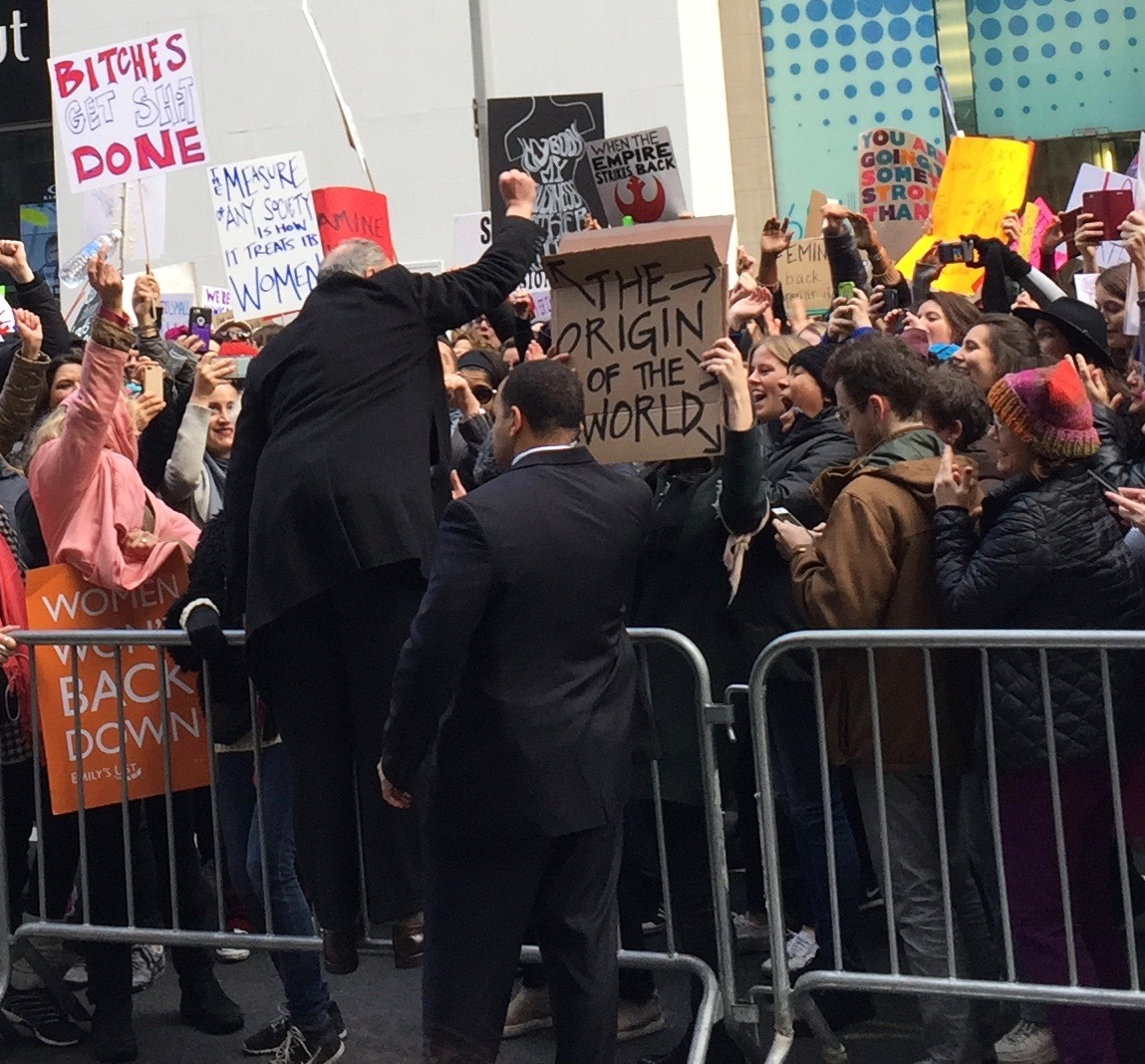
Schumer attended an anti-Trump march in New York City on January 21, 2017.

Schumer visits each of New York's 62 counties every year, and has done so every year he has served in the Senate, the only New York senator to have done so. He has a reputation for focusing on local issues relevant to average New Yorkers not associated with US senators' typical policy concerns, such as tourism, local taxes, and job creation. When Adidas planned to end its contract for the manufacture of NBA jerseys with American Classic Outfitters, an upstate New York apparel company, and outsource production overseas, Schumer blasted the company, citing the risk to 100 workers at the plant.

When Canon Inc. was considering relocating from its corporate headquarters in Long Island because of a dispute over road infrastructure funding, Schumer advocated that New York State redirect federal stimulus dollars to make necessary road improvements to keep the company in the region. Along with his House and Senate colleagues, Schumer killed a George W. Bush-era subcontracting plan for utility and custodial workers at the United States Military Academy at West Point. The plan called for turning over custodial and utility work to a Georgia company.

In November 2017, Schumer and Senator Kirsten Gillibrand announced $1,908,486 in funding for Head Start and Early Head Start programs at the Community Action Organization of Erie County. Schumer said the funding would yield "real results to young students in Western New York by providing them with the resources they need to succeed both in and out of the classroom".

In January 2018, Schumer requested that the U.S. Department of Veteran Affairs complete final acquisitions for two 60-acre and 77-acre parcels in Pembroke, New York, and initiate construction of the New Western New York National Veterans Cemetery, saying the completion of the cemetery would ensure "Western New York's military veterans will have the proper burial, at a site close to the homes, families, and the very communities they dedicated their lives to defend and serve."

=== Net neutrality ===
In November 2017, Schumer said, "Just as our free highway system helped build jobs in America in the 20th century, net neutrality will help build jobs in the 21st century. To take a step back hurts our economy, our job growth and middle-class and working people. It is a disaster." In December, after the FCC voted to repeal net neutrality rules, Schumer said the internet could start resembling "a toll road, with the highest bidders cruising along private 'fast lanes' while the rest of us inch along a single, traffic-choked public lane; and we could be forced to purchase internet packages much like cable packages, paying more for popular sites", and that the resolution he was introducing would undo the effects of the vote.

In January 2018, Schumer announced all 49 members of the Democratic caucus supported a resolution overturning the FCC vote on net neutrality and said congressional Republicans "have the opportunity to right the administration's wrong and show the American people whose side they're on: big ISPs' and major corporations' or consumers', entrepreneurs', and small business owners'." In May, the Senate adopted a measure to revive Obama-era internet regulations enforcing equal treatment for all web traffic. Schumer called the vote "our best chance to make sure the internet stays accessible and affordable to all Americans". In June, in response to the Republican-controlled House not taking up the Senate resolution restoring net neutrality rules, Schumer said, "House Republican leaders gave a green light to the big ISPs to charge middle-class Americans, small business owners, schools, rural Americans, and communities of color more to use the internet."

=== Same-sex marriage ===
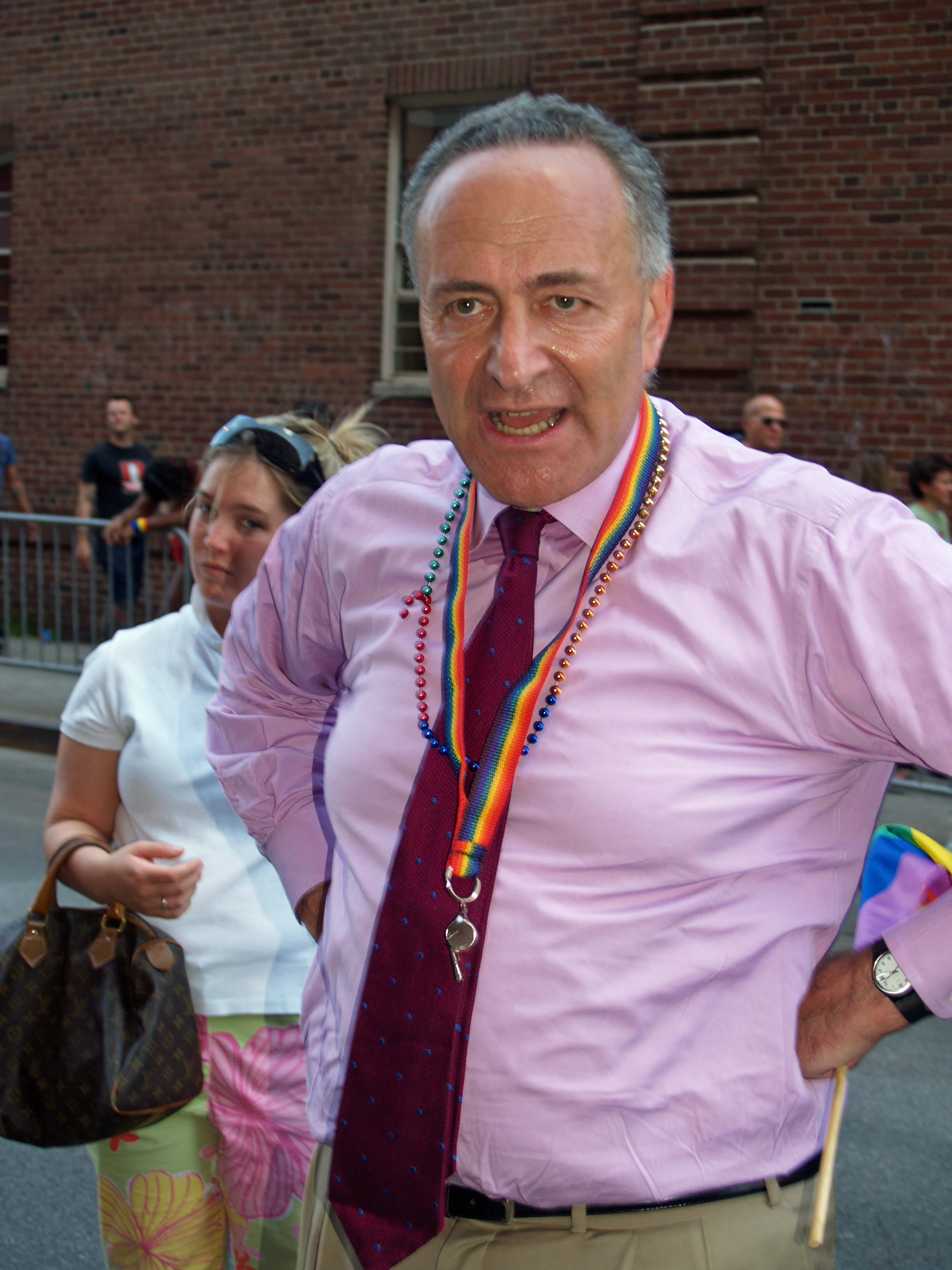
Schumer at New York City's gay pride parade in 2007

Schumer voted for the Defense of Marriage Act (DOMA) in 1996. He opposed the Federal Marriage Amendment, saying in 2004 that DOMA made it obsolete.

In March 2009, Schumer announced his support for same-sex marriage, noting that it "was time". He previously supported civil unions. At a private dinner with gay leaders on March 22, 2009, Schumer said he not only supported same-sex marriage, he also backed a full reversal of DOMA. When the New York State Senate took up a bill to legalize gay marriage in December 2009, Schumer and other statewide officials aggressively lobbied wavering senators to support the legislation.

=== Student loan forgiveness ===
Schumer supports the cancellation of $50,000 or more in federal student loan debt for every borrower by executive action.

=== Subprime mortgage and foreclosure crisis ===
In September 2007, Schumer proposed that the Office of Federal Housing Enterprise Oversight (OFHEO) raise Fannie Mae and Freddie Mac's conforming loan ("affordable") limits from $417,000 to $625,000, thereby allowing these government-sponsored enterprises (GSEs) to back mortgages on homes priced up to $780,000 with a 20% down payment.

After the March 2007 meltdown of the subprime mortgage industry, Schumer proposed a federal government bailout of subprime borrowers to save homeowners from losing their residences and to shore up communities that were seeing neighborhoods destabilized due to foreclosures and the resulting decreases in neighboring home values. As part of a package of regulatory reforms that Schumer pushed in response to the subprime foreclosure crisis, he called for the creation of mortgage industry regulators to protect borrowers from deceptive lending practices and called for the Securities and Exchange Commission to move from Washington to New York so that it was in closer proximity to the industry it was charged with overseeing.

Schumer's top nine campaign contributors are all financial institutions that have contributed over $2.5 million.

=== Taxes on high incomes ===
Schumer had been a staunch defender of low taxes on hedge fund and private equity managers in the mid-2000s, arguing that this was necessary to protect the industry. Then serving on both the Senate Banking and Finance Committees, Schumer was in a position to block attempts to tax their financial gains at the rate other taxpayers pay for income. But in 2010, he suggested that a hedge-fund tax would be acceptable and not hurt the industry.

In February 2012, Schumer at first said he disagreed with the Obama administration's call to raise taxes on those making more than $250,000 a year, calling for a million-dollar floor instead. According to Schumer, "in large parts of the country, that kind of income does not get you a big home or lots of vacations or anything else that is associated with wealth." He later stood by the assertion but also said that raising taxes on those making more than $250,000 was necessary to bring in enough revenue.

=== Technology and the Internet ===
In June 2011, Schumer and Senator Joe Manchin sought a crackdown on Bitcoin, saying it facilitated illegal drug trade transactions. "The transactions leave no traditional [bank transfer] money trail for investigators to follow, and leave it hard to prove a package recipient knew in advance what was in a shipment," which used the anonymizing network Tor. One opinion website said the senators wanted "to disrupt [the] Silk Road drug website".

Schumer was a sponsor of S. 968, the controversial PROTECT IP Act, which would restrict access to websites judged to be infringing copyrights. On January 18, 2012, the NY Tech Meetup and other cybertech organizations held a demonstration with 2,000 protesters in front of the offices of Schumer and Kirsten Gillibrand, who also supported the bill. Some demonstrators complained that the bill had originated with wealthy campaign contributors who would reward legislators for passing the bill.

In March 2012, Schumer and Senator Richard Blumenthal gained national attention after they called upon Attorney General Eric Holder and the Department of Justice to investigate practices by employers to require Facebook passwords for employee applicants and workers.

==== Facebook ====
Schumer has offered political support to Facebook, acting as an ally and seeking to advance the company's interests in Senate debates about regulating it or probing its involvement in various controversies, including Russian interference in the 2016 election. In July 2018, he confronted Senator Mark Warner, and urged him not to lose sight of the need for Facebook to tackle problems with right-wing disinformation and election interference, as well as consumer privacy and other issues. As of 2018, one of Schumer's daughters worked as a marketing manager at Facebook.

=== U.S. attorney firings ===
As chair of the Subcommittee on Administrative Oversight and the Courts, Schumer took a lead role in the investigation of the dismissal of U.S. attorneys controversy. Although he was at one point criticized for being a lead investigator of the affair while also chairing the Democratic Senatorial Campaign Committee, such criticism was not sustained after the full dimensions of the controversy became apparent.

On March 11, 2007, Schumer became the first lawmaker in either chamber to call for Attorney General Alberto Gonzales to resign for firing eight United States Attorneys. In an interview on CBS News's Face the Nation, Schumer said that Gonzales "doesn't accept or doesn't understand that he is no longer just the president's lawyer". When Gonzales's chief of staff, Kyle Sampson, resigned on March 13, Schumer said during a press conference that Gonzales was "carrying out the political wishes of the president" and declared that Sampson would "not be the next Scooter Libby", meaning that he did not accept that Sampson had sole responsibility for the controversy.

Like other members of the Senate Judiciary Committee from both parties, Schumer was angered during Gonzales's testimony on April 19, 2007; Gonzales answered many times that he did not know or could not recall details about the controversy. When Schumer's turn came to ask his last round of questions, he instead repeated his call for Gonzales to resign, saying that there was no point to further questioning since Gonzales had "answered 'I don't know' or 'I can't recall' to close to a hundred questions" about the firings (most press reports counted 71 instances) and did not seem to know about the inner workings of his department. Gonzales responded that the onus was on the committee to prove whether anything improper occurred. Schumer replied that Gonzales faced a higher standard, and that under this standard he had to give "a full, complete and convincing explanation" for why the eight attorneys were fired.

== Other work ==
In January 2007, Schumer published a book, Positively American: Winning Back the Middle-Class Majority One Family at a Time, outlining strategies by which Democrats could court middle-class voters. One of his aides at the time, Daniel Squadron, helped write it, and they drew from Schumer's experience helping his party win in the 2006 midterm elections.

On November 21, 2023, Schumer made his Broadway debut in a one-night performance as the Producer in Gutenberg! The Musical!.

== Personal life ==
Schumer and his wife, Iris Weinshall, were married on September 21, 1980. The ceremony took place at Windows on the World atop the north tower of the World Trade Center. Weinshall was New York City's commissioner of transportation from 2000 to 2007. Schumer and Weinshall live in Park Slope near Grand Army Plaza.

The Schumers have two daughters, Jessica and Alison, both graduates of their father's alma mater, Harvard College. Jessica served as chief of staff and general counsel of the Council of Economic Advisers from May 2013 to August 2015. Alison is a marketing manager in Facebook's New York office. In 2018, Jessica gave birth to a son, making Schumer a grandfather. He now has three grandchildren.

== Electoral history ==
Year	Office	Type	Party	Main opponent	Party	Votes for Schumer				Total			Result	Swing
Year	Office	Type	Party	Main opponent	Party	Total	%	P.	±%	Votes	%	±%	Result	Swing
1998	Senator	Dem. primary	Democratic	Geraldine Ferraro	Democratic	388,701	50.84%	1st	N/A	N/A			Won	N/A
1998	Senator	Ind. primary	Independence	Mark Green	Independence	2,562	58.04%	1st	N/A	N/A			Won	N/A
1998	Senator	General	Democratic	Al D'Amato (inc.)	Republican	2,386,314	51.09%	1st	+5.52%	2,551,065	54.62%	+6.82%	Won	Gain
1998	Senator	General	Independence	Al D'Amato (inc.)	Conservative	109,027	2.33%	4th	N/A	2,551,065	54.62%	+6.82%	Won	Gain
1998	Senator	General	Liberal	Al D'Amato (inc.)	Right to Life	55,724	1.19%	6th	−1.03%	2,551,065	54.62%	+6.82%	Won	Gain
2004	Senator	General	Democratic	Howard Mills	Republican	4,384,907	65.42%	1st	+14.33%	4,769,824	71.2%	+16.58%	Won	Hold
2004	Senator	General	Independence	Howard Mills	Republican	216,198	3.23%	4th	+0.9%	4,769,824	71.2%	+16.58%	Won	Hold
2004	Senator	General	Working Families	Howard Mills	Republican	168,719	2.52%	5th	N/A	4,769,824	71.2%	+16.58%	Won	Hold
2010	Senator	General	Democratic	Jay Townsend	Republican	2,686,043	58.47%	1st	−6.95%	3,047,111	66.33%	-4.87%	Won	Hold
2010	Senator	General	Working Families	Jay Townsend	Republican	183,672	4.00%	4th	+1.48%	3,047,111	66.33%	-4.87%	Won	Hold
2010	Senator	General	Independence	Jay Townsend	Conservative	177,396	3.86%	5th	+0.63%	3,047,111	66.33%	-4.87%	Won	Hold
2016	Senator	General	Democratic	Wendy Long	Republican	4,784,218	64.72%	1st	+6.25%	5,221,945	70.64%	+4.31%	Won	Hold
2016	Senator	General	Working Families	Wendy Long	Republican	241,672	3.27%	4th	−0.73%	5,221,945	70.64%	+4.31%	Won	Hold
2016	Senator	General	Independence	Wendy Long	Conservative	150,654	2.04%	5th	−1.82%	5,221,945	70.64%	+4.31%	Won	Hold
2016	Senator	General	Women's Equality	Wendy Long	Reform	45,401	0.61%	6th	N/A	5,221,945	70.64%	+4.31%	Won	Hold
2022	Senator	General	Democratic	Joe Pinion	Republican	3,022,822	51.69%	1st	−13.03%	3,320,561	56.78%	-13.86	Won	Hold
2022	Senator	General	Working Families	Joe Pinion	Conservative	297,739	5.09%	3rd	+1.82%	3,320,561	56.78%	-13.86	Won	Hold

== Honorary degrees ==
Schumer has been awarded several honorary degrees in recognition of his political career. These include:

Location	Date	Institution	Degree
New York	1999	Hofstra University	Doctorate
New York	June 3, 1999	Hunter College	Doctor of Humane Letters (DHL)
New York	May 21, 2000	Adelphi University	Doctor of Humane Letters (DHL)
New York	June 2, 2002	New York Law School	Doctor of Laws (LL.D)
New York	May 2004	Pace University	Doctor of Humane Letters (DHL)
New York	October 21, 2007	Touro Law Center	Juris Doctor (JD)
New York	2015	Brooklyn Law School	Doctor of Laws (LL.D)

== See also ==
- List of Jewish members of the United States Congress

== Notes ==
U.S. House of Representatives
Preceded by Elizabeth Holtzman	Member of the U.S. House of Representatives from New York's 16th congressional district 1981–1983	Succeeded by Charlie Rangel
Preceded by Mario Biaggi	Member of the U.S. House of Representatives from New York's 10th congressional district 1983–1993	Succeeded by Edolphus Towns
Preceded by Thomas Manton	Member of the U.S. House of Representatives from New York's 9th congressional district 1993–1999	Succeeded by Anthony Weiner
Party political offices
Preceded by Robert Abrams	Democratic nominee for U.S. Senator from New York (Class 3); 1998, 2004, 2010, 2016, 2022	Most recent
Preceded by Jon Corzine	Chair of the Democratic Senatorial Campaign Committee; 2005–2009	Succeeded by Bob Menendez
New office	Vice Chair of the Senate Democratic Caucus; 2007–2017	Succeeded by Mark Warner
New office	Vice Chair of the Senate Democratic Caucus; 2007–2017	Succeeded by Elizabeth Warren
Preceded by Byron Dorgan	Chair of the Senate Democratic Policy Committee; 2011–2017	Succeeded by Debbie Stabenow
Preceded by Harry Reid	Senate Democratic Leader; Chair of the Senate Democratic Caucus; 2017–present	Incumbent
U.S. Senate
Preceded by Al D'Amato	United States Senator (Class 3) from New York; 1999–present Served alongside: Pat Moynihan, Hillary Clinton, Kirsten Gillibrand	Incumbent
Preceded by Jim Saxton	Chair of the Joint Economic Committee; 2007–2009	Succeeded by Carolyn Maloney
Preceded by Dianne Feinstein	Chair of the Senate Rules Committee; 2009–2015	Succeeded by Roy Blunt
Preceded by Bob Brady	Chair of the Joint Printing Committee; 2009–2015	Succeeded by Gregg Harper
Preceded by Bob Brady	Chair of the Joint Library Committee; 2011–2013	Succeeded by Gregg Harper
Preceded by Dianne Feinstein	Chair of the Joint Inaugural Ceremonies Committee; 2012–2013	Succeeded by Roy Blunt
Preceded by Pat Roberts	Ranking Member of the Senate Rules Committee; 2015–2017	Succeeded by Amy Klobuchar
Preceded by Harry Reid	Senate Minority Leader; 2017–2021	Succeeded by Mitch McConnell
Preceded by Mitch McConnell	Senate Majority Leader; 2021–2025	Succeeded by John Thune
Preceded by Mitch McConnell	Senate Minority Leader; 2025–present	Incumbent
U.S. order of precedence (ceremonial)
Preceded by John Thune as Senate Majority Leader	Order of precedence of the United States as Senate Minority Leader	Succeeded by John Barrasso as Senate Majority Whip
Preceded by Susan Collins	United States senators by seniority 8th	Succeeded by Mike Crapo
