= The Baileys =

Family imagined by Senator Chuck Schumer to make policy decisions

Senator Chuck Schumer, the creator of the Baileys, in 2023

Joe and Eileen Bailey, referred to as the Baileys, are a fictional middle-class couple created by U.S. Senator Chuck Schumer to use as a reference point for evaluating policy ideas and decisions.

Schumer first publicly described the Baileys in Positively American, his 2007 book. Schumer stated at the time that he had "been living with the Baileys for decades. I talk to them. I know them. They're real to me."

Schumer has described the Baileys as "Reagan-era Republicans." Joe and Eileen are married and have three children: Megan, Abby, and Pete. They live in Massapequa, New York, and according to Schumer, both voted for Donald Trump in the 2016 United States presidential election; only Joe Bailey voted for Trump in 2020.

Schumer has attributed all of his political success throughout his career to the Baileys. He has been criticized for prioritizing the opinions of the imaginary Baileys over his real constituents.

== Political views ==
Schumer has stated that the Baileys are not affiliated with one party, but are independents, and considered swing voters. Despite this, Joe has voted for the Republican Party nominee for president eight or nine times and the Democratic Party nominee three or four times. Eileen has voted for the Republican Party nominee seven or eight times, and the Democratic Party nominee for president four or five times.

The Baileys very much do not like flag burning and see the act as a personal affront. They think that when politicians talk about abortion frequently or in a way that is "morally neutral... it comes across as an endorsement", and that Democrats need to focus on making abortion "rare" in order "to be in step". The Baileys opposed gay marriage in the early 2000s.

Schumer stated that in 2006, the Baileys voted for a Democrat "for the first time in years".

=== Voting record in presidential elections ===
Election	Joe's vote	Eileen's vote
1980	Ronald Reagan	Ronald Reagan
1984	Ronald Reagan	Ronald Reagan
1988	George H. W. Bush	George H. W. Bush
1992	Bill Clinton	Bill Clinton
1996	Bill Clinton	Bill Clinton
2000	George W. Bush	George W. Bush
2004	George W. Bush ("eagerly")	George W. Bush
2008	Unknown	Unknown
2012	Barack Obama	Barack Obama
2016	Donald Trump	Donald Trump
2020	Donald Trump ("with misgivings")	Unknown (not Donald Trump)
2024	Donald Trump	Donald Trump

== The family ==
Schumer stated that they were 45 years old in March 2007, which makes them 64–65 years old in November 2026. Joe Bailey is an insurance salesman who earned $50,000 in 2007. Eileen Bailey works part-time in a medical office and earned a salary of $20,000 in 2007.

Joe and Eileen have three children: Megan, Abby, and Pete. In 2007, Megan was 16, Abby was 11, and Pete's age was not given. Eileen's brother-in-law is a self employed building contractor who commits tax evasion; the Baileys know about this and do not blame him.

Joe and Eileen watch Sex and the City and Desperate Housewives, and Joe enjoys playing golf.

=== History ===
Schumer first referred to the Baileys as the O'Reillys, changing their name to the Baileys, according to Schumer's spokesperson at the time, "to make them appeal to a national audience." Prior to the spokesperson's statement, a former aide had told The Hill that Schumer changed their name because the O'Reillys was "too ethnic", which Schumer's spokesperson at the time refuted.

== Reactions ==
=== Upon release ===
Soon after Positively American was released, a number of outlets reported on the existence of the Baileys as an imaginary family that Senator Schumer would "consult" when making policy decisions. Upon the publishing, there was some uncertainty about the original name for the family, where exactly they lived, if their name was ever changed and, if it had been changed, for what reason.

Political commentator Maggie Gallagher, writing in RealClearPolitics, said of the Baileys "Ahem, on behalf of all of Chuck's 19 million fellow constituents: Does the good senator really know no actual hard-working families he might consult, who have the additional advantage of actually existing?"

=== Subsequent reactions ===
The Baileys were featured in episode 20 of season 12 of Last Week Tonight with John Oliver, first airing August 10, 2025. The episode featured a dramatic rendition of a conversation Oliver imagines the Baileys might have. Oliver reports that in Schumer's book Positively American, the Baileys are mentioned 265 times over the 264-page book. In the episode, Oliver criticized Schumer for attempting to tailor Democratic policy toward right-wing suburban voters like the Baileys while alienating other parts of the Democratic base and additional non-voters in the process.

Expressing his disappointment in Schumer after his handling of the 2025 United States federal government shutdown, journalist Jeet Heer wrote in The Nation "Schumer's colleagues should also encourage him to resign from the Senate itself. One argument they can make is that in retirement Schumer will have much more time to carry on his chats with the Baileys." Heer's column was titled "Chuck Schumer Should Resign to Spend More Time With His Imaginary Friends".
