= Subprime crisis impact timeline =

US events during the subprime mortgage crisis

The subprime mortgage crisis impact timeline lists dates relevant to the creation of a United States housing bubble, the 2005 housing bubble burst and the subprime mortgage crisis which developed during 2007 and 2008. It includes United States enactment of government laws and regulations, as well as public and private actions which affected the housing industry and related banking and investment activity. It also notes details of important incidents in the United States, such as bankruptcies and takeovers, and information and statistics about relevant trends. For more information on reverberations of this crisis throughout the global financial system see 2008 financial crisis.

== 1938–1979 ==
- 1938: The Federal National Mortgage Association, or Fannie Mae, is established as part of Franklin D. Roosevelt's New Deal, to purchase mortgages guaranteed by the Veterans Administration and the Federal Housing Administration. This took the loans off the books of mortgage lenders, freeing up capital so that they could make more loans.
- late 1960s: Fannie Mae is permitted to purchase 'conventional' mortgages (not just VA/FHA).
- late 1960s: Angelo Mozilo & Loeb found Countrywide Financial, and pioneer the nationwide non-bank mortgage lending business; in the beginning, Mozilo is extremely concerned with credit quality.
- 1968: Fannie Mae spins off Ginnie Mae as a separate entity. Ginnie will continue to have an explicit, written government guarantee for all its mortgage loans. Fannie Mae, however, is converted into a stand-alone corporation, a government-sponsored enterprise (GSE).
- 1970: Federal Home Loan Mortgage Corporation (Freddie Mac) is created by an act of Congress as a government-sponsored enterprise to buy mortgages from the Thrift/savings and loan industry; it is owned by the industry itself (until 1989)
- The GSEs (Fannie and Freddie) have an 'implicit guarantee' from the government; that if they get into trouble, the government will bail them out. There is no written law or contract stating the government will do this; it is simply assumed by the industry, government officials, and investors. This implicit, unstated guarantee is what allows the debt of Fannie and Freddie to be moved off of the balance sheet of the government. This makes the national debt falsely appear to be lower than it really is, and artificially makes the budget look more balanced. This arrangement will not be tested until 2008 (see below)
- 1970: Ginnie Mae creates the first mortgage-backed security, based on FHA and VA mortgages. It guarantees them.
- 1971: Freddie issues its first Mortgage Participation Certificate security. This is the first mortgage-backed security made of ordinary mortgages.
- 1970s: Private companies begin mortgage asset securitization with the creation of private mortgage pools in the 1970s.
- 1974: Equal Credit Opportunity Act imposes heavy sanctions for financial institutions found guilty of discrimination on the basis of race, color, religion, national origin, sex, marital status, or age
- 1977: Community Reinvestment Act is enacted to address historical discrimination in lending, such as 'redlining'. The Act encourages commercial banks and savings associations to meet the needs of borrowers in all segments of their communities, including low- and moderate-income neighborhoods.
- 1977: Salomon Brothers attempts creation of a "private label" mortgage backed security (one that doesn't involve GSE mortgages). It fails in the marketplace.
- Late 1970s: Lewis Ranieri (Salomon) and Larry Fink (First Boston) invent securitization; mortgages are pooled and the pool is sliced into tranches, which are then sold to investors.

== 1980–1989 ==
- 1980: The Depository Institutions Deregulation and Monetary Control Act (DIDMCA) of 1980 grants all thrifts, including savings and loan associations, the power to make consumer and commercial loans and to issue transaction accounts. The law also exempts federally chartered savings banks, installment plan sellers and chartered loan companies from state usury (unlimited high interest rates) limits. The law also allowed home equity loans to be treated just like mortgages.
- 1981: Each of the 12 Federal Reserve banks establishes a Community Affairs Office to offer public and private guidance in accordance with the Community Reinvestment Act.
- 1981: Salomon Brothers transitions from a private partnership to a public corporation, the first of the Wall St. investment banks to do so. This shifts the risk of financial loss from the partners to shareholders, arguably increasing the appetite for risk.
- 1981: David Maxwell becomes CEO of Fannie; he greatly increases the use of mortgage securities, forming an uneasy alliance with Ranieri and Fink
- 1982: Reagan's Commission on Housing recommends the GSEs be separated from the government
- 1982: Alternative Mortgage Transaction Parity Act of 1982 (AMTPA) preempts state laws allows lenders to originate mortgages with features such as adjustable-rate mortgages, balloon payments, and negative amortization and "allows lenders to make loans with terms that may obscure the total cost of a loan".
- 1983: The first collateralized mortgage obligation (CMO) is created by Larry Fink's team at First Boston. It is made from Freddie Mac mortgages.
- 1984: The Secondary Market Enhancement Act (SMMEA), partly formed by Ranieri's closeness with Reagan's staff, attempts to level the playing field on the mortgage securities market so that private mortgage-securities companies (like Salomon Brothers) will be able to compete with the GSEs. The act also is the foundation of the credit ratings agencies importance in the market; the law limits pension funds & others so that they are only allowed to buy mortgage bonds that are rated highly by a NRSRO
- 1986: Tax Reform Act of 1986 (TRA) ended prohibited taxpayers from deducting interest on consumer loans, such as credit cards and auto loans, while allowing them to deduct interest paid on mortgage loans, providing an incentive for homeowners to take out home equity loans to pay off consumer debt. Household debt would grow from $705 billion at year end 1974, 60% of disposable personal income, to $7.4 trillion at year end 2000, and finally to $14.5 trillion in midyear 2008, 134% of disposable personal income.
- 1986: The Real Estate Mortgage Investment Conduit (REMIC) law is passed, as part of an uneasy alliance between Ranieri (of Salomon) and Maxwell (of Fannie). It prevents double-taxation of mortgage securities; the 'secondary market' for mortgages booms.
- 1987: The mezzanine CDO was invented at Drexel Burnham Lambert
- 1987: Maxwell of Fannie, fights bitterly with Wall Street and Congress about allowing GSEs to do REMICs. Lobbying and threats fly back and forth.
- 1985–1989: The effects of Tax Reform Act of 1986, the elimination of Regulation Q which had capped interest rates banks were allowed to pay, imprudent lending during the late 1970s inflationary period, as well as other causes, led to asset-liability mismatch for many Savings and Loans. This de facto insolvency led to the Savings and Loan Crisis and the failure and/or closure of half of all federally insured savings and loans. The number declined from 3,234 to 1,645.
- Late 1980s: Several groups lose big money on tranched mortgage securities, including Merrill Lynch. The market shrinks.
- 1988: Guardian Savings and Loan issues the first 'subprime'-backed mortgage security. Long Beach Mortgage begins to move towards the subprime securitization market. Its employees will later go on to lead many other subprime companies.
- 1989–1995: Financial Institutions Reform, Recovery and Enforcement Act (FIRREA) established the Resolution Trust Corporation (RTC), which closed hundreds of insolvent savings and loans holding $519 billion in assets. The law also moved regulatory authority to the Office of Thrift Supervision (OTS). The U.S. government ultimately appropriated $105 billion to resolve the S&L crisis. After banks repaid loans through various procedures, there was a net loss to taxpayers of $40 billion by the end of 1999.
- The RTC decides to sell the massive amount of bad real estate debt it holds to investors. In order to do this, it decides to use the tools of securitization and structured finance, such as overcollateralization, bond insurance, and subordination. This results in transforming the bad debt into various new products that had high enough ratings to attract investors.

== 1990–1995 ==
- 1990s: The first subprime bubble. Founding of subprime lenders New Century, Option One, FirstPlus Financial, and the buyout of The Money Store. Famco and several other subprime lenders go bankrupt. Angelo Mozilo of Countrywide Financial privately calls subprime lenders 'crooks', but is forced to compete or lose market share.
- 1990s: J.P. Morgan invents value at risk and credit default swaps; later misused tragically by other companies.
- 1990: Fannie gets Paul Volcker to argue it doesn't need the same regulatory capital as banks.
- 1992: Federal Housing Enterprises Financial Safety and Soundness Act of 1992 required Fannie Mae and Freddie Mac to devote a percentage of their lending to support affordable housing, increasing their pooling and selling of such loans as securities; Office of Federal Housing Enterprise Oversight (OFHEO) created to oversee them
- 1992: Jim Johnson is new CEO at Fannie. Ramps up the 'cut them off at the knees' strategy against political enemies. Tactics include a massive lobbying effort, neutering the OFHEO, creating a "partnership office" network to court the politically powerful with pork, giving high level employment to the well connected, giving out campaign contributions, creating a charity foundation, and threatening critics like FM Watch with retaliation. One of McClean & Nocera's sources compared Fannie's activities to Tammany Hall.
- 1993: The Federal Reserve Bank of Boston published "Closing the Gap: A Guide to Equal Opportunity Lending", which recommended a series of measures to better serve low-income and minority households, including loosening income thresholds for receiving a mortgage, influencing government policy and housing activist demands on banks thereafter.
- 1994: Riegle-Neal Interstate Banking and Branching Efficiency Act of 1994 (IBBEA) repeals the interstate provisions of the Bank Holding Company Act of 1956 that regulated the actions of bank holding companies.
- 1994: J.P. Morgan & Blythe Masters sell the first credit default swap to the European Bank for Reconstruction and Development, to insure Exxon's JPM credit line, & free up JPM's capital
- 1995: New Community Reinvestment Act (CRA) regulations break down home-loan data by neighborhood, income, and race, enabling community groups to complain to banks and regulators about CRA compliance. Regulations also allow community groups that market loans to collect a broker's fee. Fannie Mae allowed to receive affordable housing credit for buying subprime securities.

== 1995–2000 ==
- 1995–2001: Dot-com bubble and collapse
- c. 1996: President Clinton's "National Homeownership Strategy"
- June 1996 - Freddie Mac publishes FICO score cutoffs, intended to set the minimum standard for investment quality mortgage originations. This was done as result of slow technology adoption for Freddie Mac's custom credit scoring tool and a desire to gain immediate benefits of reduced credit risk. This proves to be a huge strategic mistake because it now provides a universal basis for establishing investment quality that fuels the growth of the Subprime market. Enterprising Subprime lenders now have a universal but flawed standard for creating Alternative A (Alt A) loans (loans with high risk characteristics e.g. no income, no assets, offset by high credit scores).
- 1997: Mortgage denial rate of 29 percent for conventional home purchase loans. Investors purchased more than $60 billion of private-label (non-GSE) subprime mortgage-backed securities, six times more than 1991's volume of $10 billion.
  - J.P. Morgan bundles credit default swaps into BISTRO, the precursor of the Synthetic CDO. AIG sells credit protection against BISTRO's super-senior tranche.
  - July: The Taxpayer Relief Act of 1997 expanded the capital-gains exclusion to $500,000 (per couple) from $125,000, encouraging people to invest in second homes and investment properties.
  - November: Freddie Mac helped First Union Capital Markets and Bear Stearns & Co launch the first publicly available securitization of CRA loans, issuing $384.6 million of such securities. All carried a Freddie Mac guarantee as to timely interest and principal. First Union was not a subprime lender.
- 1998: Incipient housing bubble as inflation-adjusted home price appreciation exceeds 10% per year in most West Coast metropolitan areas.
  - The New York Fed persuades Wall Street to bail out Long-Term Capital Management (a hedge fund). Bear Stearns declines, but every other major bank agrees. Some worry the Fed intervention creates moral hazard.
  - May: Brooksley Born at the Commodity Futures Trading Commission wants to investigate over the counter derivatives like credit default swaps; their lack of transparency, lack of regulation, and possible systemic risk. Alan Greenspan, Robert Rubin, and Arthur Levitt of Clinton's Working Group on Financial Markets, and Larry Summers shut her down. She resigns soon after.
  - October: "Financial Services Modernization Act" killed in Senate because of no restrictions on Community Reinvestment Act-related community groups written into law
- 1998–2008: Credit default swaps boom along with the products they insure; mortgage securities and CDO tranches. By November 2008, there are between $33 and $47 trillion CDS contracts; nobody can know for sure because the market is unregulated and non-transparent.
- 1999:
  - September: Fannie Mae eases the credit requirements to encourage banks to extend home mortgages to individuals whose credit is not good enough to qualify for conventional loans.
  - November: The Gramm-Leach-Bliley Act (Financial Services Modernization Act) passes. It repeals the Glass-Steagall Act of 1933. It deregulates banking, insurance, securities, and the financial services industry, allowing financial institutions to grow very large. It also limits Community Reinvestment Coverage of smaller banks and makes community groups report certain financial relationships with banks. Congressmen key to the effort include Phil Gramm, Jim Leach, Thomas J. Bliley, Jr., Chuck Schumer, and Chris Dodd.
- 2000: Lenders originating $160 billion worth of subprime, up from $40 billion in 1994. Fannie Mae buys $600 million of subprime mortgages, primarily on a flow basis. Freddie Mac, in that same year, purchases $18.6 billion worth of subprime loans, mostly Alt A and A- mortgages. Freddie Mac guarantees another $7.7 billion worth of subprime mortgages in structured transactions.
  - Credit Suisse develops the first mortgage-backed CDO
  - Lehman Brothers convicted of 'aiding and abetting' the fraud of bankrupt subprime lender Famco, pays a tiny fine.
  - October: Fannie Mae commits to purchase and securitize $2 billion of Community Reinvestment Act eligible loans,
  - November: Fannie Mae announces that the Department of Housing and Urban Development (“HUD”) will soon require it to dedicate 50% of its business to low- and moderate-income families" and its goal is to finance over $500 billion in Community Reinvestment Act related business by 2010.
  - December: Commodity Futures Modernization Act of 2000 (based on a report by Summers, Greenspan, Levitt, & Rainer) declares credit default swaps (and other derivatives) to be unregulated, banning the SEC, Fed, CTFC, state insurance companies, and others from meaningful oversight. CDS eventually destroy AIG & others.

== 2001-2004 ==
- 2000–2003: Early 2000s recession spurs government action to rev up economy.
- 2000-2001: US Federal Reserve lowers Federal funds rate 11 times, from 6.5% (May 2000) to 1.75% (December 2001), creating an easy-credit environment that fueled the growth of US subprime mortgages.
- 2001: Ex-Wall Streeter John Posner writes A Home Without Equity is just a Rental with Debt, criticizing the massive growth in home equity loans and refinancing for consumer purchases, amongst other things. Charles Kindleberger of Manias, Panics, and Crashes finds it insightful; it is largely ignored.
  - July: Superior Bank of Chicago, having relied on securitization of high-risk subprime mortgages, collapses after the Pritzker family reneges on a recapitalization plan negotiated with the Office of Thrift Supervision.
- 2002-2006: Fannie Mae and Freddie Mac combined purchases of incorrectly rated AAA subprime mortgage-backed securities rise from $38 billion to $90 billion per year.
  - Lenders began to offer loans to higher-risk borrowers, Subprime mortgages amounted to $600 billion (20%) by 2006.
  - Speculation in residential real estate rose. During 2005, 28% of homes purchased were for investment purposes, with an additional 12% purchased as vacation homes. During 2006, these figures were 22% and 14%, respectively. As many as 85% of condominium properties purchased in Miami were for investment purposes which the owners resold ("flipped") without the seller ever having lived in them.
- 2002–2003: Mortgage denial rate of 14 percent for conventional home purchase loans, half of 1997.
- 2002: Annual home price appreciation of 10% or more in California, Florida, and most Northeastern states.
  - Paul O'Neill (Secretary of the Treasury) is fired by Bush. Among other things, he had wanted to take action on executive compensation and corporate governance.
  - June 17: Bush unveils his "Blueprint for the American Dream". He sets goal of increasing minority home owners by at least 5.5 million by 2010 through billions of dollars in tax credits, subsidies and a Fannie Mae commitment of $440 billion to establish NeighborWorks America with faith based organizations.
- 2003: Federal Reserve Chair Alan Greenspan lowers federal reserve's key interest rate to 1%, the lowest in 45 years.
  - August: Borio and White of Bank of International Settlements speak at the Jackson Hole Economic Symposium. Their warnings about problems with collateralized debt obligations and rating agencies are rejected or ignored by attendees, including Alan Greenspan.
  - September: Bush administration recommend moving governmental supervision of Fannie Mae and Freddie Mac under a new agency created within the Department of the Treasury. The changes are blocked by Congress.
- 2003-2007: U.S. subprime mortgages increased 292%, from $332 billion to $1.3 trillion, due primarily to the private sector entering the mortgage bond market, once an almost exclusive domain of government-sponsored enterprises like Freddie Mac.
  - The Federal Reserve fails to use its supervisory and regulatory authority over banks, mortgage underwriters and other lenders, who abandoned loan standards (employment history, income, down payments, credit rating, assets, property loan-to-value ratio and debt-servicing ability), emphasizing instead lender's ability to securitize and repackage subprime loans.
- 2004-2007: Many financial institutions issued large amounts of debt and invested in mortgage-backed securities (MBS), believing that house prices would continue to rise and that households would keep up on mortgage payments.
- 2004: U.S. homeownership rate peaks with an all-time high of 69.2 percent.
  - Following example of Countrywide Financial, the largest U.S. mortgage lender, many lenders adopt automated loan approvals that critics argued were not subjected to appropriate review and documentation according to good mortgage underwriting standards. In 2007, 40% of all subprime loans resulted from automated underwriting.Mortgage fraud by borrowers increases.
  - HUD ratcheted up Fannie Mae and Freddie Mac affordable-housing goals for next four years, from 50 percent to 56 percent, stating they lagged behind the private market; they purchased $175 billion in 2004—44 percent of the market; from 2004 to 2006, they purchased $434 billion in securities backed by subprime loans
  - October: SEC effectively suspends net capital rule for five firms—Goldman Sachs, Merrill Lynch, Lehman Brothers, Bear Stearns and Morgan Stanley. Freed from government imposed limits on the debt they can assume, they levered up 20, 30 and even 40 to 1, buying massive amounts of mortgage-backed securities and other risky investments.

== 2005 ==
- 2005:
  - c. 2005-2006: Head CDO trader at Deutsche Bank, Greg Lippmann, calls the CDO market a 'ponzi scheme'. With knowledge of management, he bets $5 billion against the housing market, while other desks at Deutsche Bank continue to sell mortgage securities to investors.
  - The Securities and Exchange Commission ceases an investigation of Bear Stearns "pricing, valuation, and analysis" of mortgage-backed collateralized debt obligations. No action is taken against Bear.
  - Robert Shiller gives talks warning about a housing bubble to the Office of the Comptroller of the Currency and the Federal Deposit Insurance Corporation. He is ignored, and would later call it an incidence of Groupthink. That same year, his second edition of Irrational Exuberance warns that the housing bubble might lead to a worldwide recession.
  - January:
    - Federal Reserve Governor Edward Gramlich raises concerns over subprime lending practices, says mortgage brokers might not have incentives for careful underwriting and that portion of the subprime industry was veering close to a breakdown, that it's possible that it is a bubble but that the housing market did not qualify for specific monetary policy treatment at this point.
    - The Bank of International Settlements warns about the problems with structured financial products, and points out the conflict of interest of credit rating agencies - that they are being paid by the same companies they are supposed to be objectively evaluating.
  - February: The Office of Thrift Supervision implements new rules that allow savings and loans with over $1 billion in assets to meet their CRA obligations without investing in local communities, cutting availability of subprime loans.
  - June: At Lehman Brothers, Mike Gelband & friends make a push to get out of the mortgage market and start shorting it. They are ignored and later fired. Dr Madelyn Antoncic, '2006 risk manager of the year', is shut out of meetings by CEO Dick Fuld and Joe Gregory; she is fired in 2007.
  - June: The International Swaps and Derivatives Association smooths the process of creating credit default swaps against ABS CDOs; a boon for hedge funds.
  - August: Economist Raghuram Rajan delivers his paper "Has Financial Development Made the World Riskier?", warning about credit default swaps, the growing risks in the financial system, and that a financial crisis could be in the offing, at the Jackson Hole Economic Symposium. His arguments are rejected by attendees, including Alan Greenspan, Donald Kohn, and Lawrence Summers.
  - September: The Mortgage Insurance Companies of America send a letter to the Federal Reserve, warning about 'risky lending practices' in US real estate.
  - Fall 2005: Booming housing market halts abruptly; from the fourth quarter of 2005 to the first quarter of 2006, median prices nationwide drop 3.3 percent.
  - 2005: Economist Fred Harrison commented: "“The next property market tipping point is due at end of 2007 or early 2008 ...The only way prices can be brought back to affordable levels is a slump or recession.”

== 2006 ==
  - 2006: Commerzbank begins to stop building its massive subprime position
  - January: Financial analyst Gary Shilling writes an article entitled: “The Housing Bubble Will Probably Burst”.
  - Early: AIG gets scared and stops selling credit protection against CDOs. The Monolines (AMBAC, MBIA) continue to sell, though.
  - May: JPMorgan's Christopher Flanagan, director of global structured finance research, warns clients of housing downturn, especially sub-prime. He urged the firm's clients to go short in sub-prime.
  - May: The subprime lender Ameriquest announces it will cut 3,800 jobs, close its 229 retail branches, and rely instead on the Web.
  - May: Merit Financial Inc, based in Kirkland, Washington, files for bankruptcy and closes its doors, firing all but 80 of its 410 employees; Merit's marketplace decline about 40% and sales are not bringing in enough revenue to support overhead.
  - Mayish: Merrill Lynch fires Jeff Kronthal, who had formerly worked under Lew Ranieri at Salomon Brothers, and his team, because they made a presentation outlining the risks of the mortgage CDO market.
  - Middle: Merrill Lynch CDO sales department has trouble selling the super senior tranche of its CDOs. Instead, it sets up a group within Merrill to buy the tranches so that the sales group can keep making bonuses.
  - Middle: Magnetar Capital starts creating CDOs to fail on purpose, so that it can profit from the insurance (credit default swaps) it has bought against their failure. Their program is so large that it helps extend the credit bubble into 2007, thus making the crash worse.
  - August: U.S. Home Construction Index is down over 40% as of mid-August 2006 compared to a year earlier.
  - August: Financial commentator Peter Schiff says in an interview, "The United States is like the Titanic and I am here with the lifeboat trying to get people to leave the ship.... I see a real financial crisis coming for the United States."
  - September 7: Nouriel Roubini warns the International Monetary Fund about a coming US housing bust, mortgage-backed securities failures, bank failures, and recession. His prediction was based partly on his study of economic crises in Russia (1998), Argentina (2000), Mexico (1994), and Asia (1997)
  - Fall 2006 J.P. Morgan CEO Jamie Dimon directs the firm to reduce its exposure to subprime mortgages.
  - November: UBS's Laurie Goodman sounded "the alarm about an impending crisis in the U.S. housing market." Few investors listened including UBS's own asset management division.
  - December 2006 Goldman Sachs claims after the fact that it began reducing its exposure to subprime mortgages at this point. It also begins betting against the housing market, while continuing to sell CDOs to its clients. Others claim these risk decisions were made in the spring and summer 2007.

== 2007 ==
Home sales continue to fall. The plunge in existing-home sales is the steepest since 1989. In Q1/2007, S&P/Case-Shiller house price index records first year-over-year decline in nationwide house prices since 1991. The subprime mortgage industry collapses, and a surge of foreclosure activity (twice as bad as 2006) and rising interest rates threaten to depress prices further as problems in the subprime markets spread to the near-prime and prime mortgage markets.

Lehman Brothers leaders Dick Fuld and Joe Gregory double down; in 2007 they fire their internal critics and spend billions of dollars on real estate investments that will, within a year, become worthless, including Archstone-Smith and McAllister Ranch.

  - January 3: Ownit Mortgage Solutions Inc. files for Chapter 11; it owed Merrill Lynch around $93 million.
  - January 29: American Freedom Mortgage, Inc. files for Chapter 7 protection.
  - February 5: Mortgage Lenders Network USA Inc., the country's 15th largest subprime lender with $3.3 billion in loans funded in third quarter 2006, files for Chapter 11.
  - February 8: HSBC warns that bad debt provisions for 2006 would be 20% higher than expected to roughly $10.5bn (£5bn).
  - February 22: HSBC fires head of its US mortgage lending business as losses reach $10.5bn.
  - February 26: Comments by former Federal Reserve Chairman, Alan Greenspan, set off market tremors.
  - February 27: Dow Jones drops 416 points (3.3%).
  - February–March: Subprime industry collapse; several subprime lenders declaring bankruptcy, announcing significant losses, or putting themselves up for sale. These include Accredited Home Lenders Holding, New Century Financial, DR Horton and Countrywide Financial Fremont Investment & Loan discontinues subprime lending after receiving a cease and desist notice from the FDIC.
  - March: The value of USA subprime mortgages was estimated at $1.3 trillion as of March 2007.
  - March 6: In a speech before the Independent Community Bankers of America's Annual Convention and Techworld, Honolulu, Hawaii, Ben Bernanke, quoting Alan Greenspan, warns that the Government Sponsored Enterprises (GSEs), Fannie Mae and Freddie Mac, were a source of "systemic risk" and suggest legislation to head off a possible crisis
  - April 2: New Century Financial, largest U.S. subprime lender, files for chapter 11 bankruptcy.
  - April 3: According to CNN Money, business sources report lenders made $640 billion in subprime loans in 2006, nearly twice the level three years earlier; subprime loans amounted to about 20 percent of the nation's mortgage lending and about 17 percent of home purchases; financial firms and hedge funds likely own more than $1 trillion in securities backed by subprime mortgage; about 13 percent of subprime loans are now delinquent, more than five times the delinquency rate for home loans to borrowers with top credit; more than 2 percent of subprime loans had foreclosure proceedings start in the fourth quarter.
  - April 18: Freddie Mac fined $3.8 million by the Federal Election Commission as a result of illegal campaign contributions, much of it to members of the United States House Committee on Financial Services which oversees Freddie Mac.
  - June: "Shorts" actively prevent banks (like Bear Stearns) from helping homeowners avoid foreclosure. Shorts are hedge funds and proprietary bank traders like John Paulson, Kyle Bass, and Greg Lippman, who will profit from the housing crash. Harvey Pitt lobbies the SEC for shorts.
  - June 7: Bear Stearns & Co informs investors in two of its CDO hedge funds, the High-Grade Structured Credit Strategies Enhanced Leverage Fund and the High-Grade Structured Credit Fund that it was halting redemptions.
  - June 20: Merrill Lynch seizes $800 million in assets from Bear Stearn's hedge funds as the funds implode.
  - June 25: FDIC Chair Shelia Bair cautioned against the more flexible risk management standards of the Basel II international accord and lowering bank capital requirements generally: "There are strong reasons for believing that banks left to their own devices would maintain less capital -- not more -- than would be prudent. The fact is, banks do benefit from implicit and explicit government safety nets...In short, regulators can't leave capital decisions totally to the banks."
  - July 19: Dow Jones Industrial Average closes above 14,000 for the first time in its history.
  - August: Worldwide "credit crunch" as subprime mortgage backed securities are discovered in portfolios of banks and hedge funds around the world, from BNP Paribas to Bank of China. Many lenders stop offering home equity loans and "stated income" loans. Federal Reserve injects about $100 billion into the money supply for banks to borrow at a low rate.
  - August 6: American Home Mortgage Investment Corporation (AHMI) files Chapter 11 bankruptcy. The company expects to see up to a $60 million loss for the first quarter 2007.
  - August 7: Numerous quantitative long/short equity hedge funds suddenly begin experiencing unprecedented losses as a result of what is believed to be liquidations by some managers eager to access cash during the liquidity crisis. It highlights one of the first examples of the contagion effect of the subprime crisis spilling over into a radically different business area.
  - August 7: Then-candidate Hillary Clinton gives another speech warning of the economic threats from the subprime market that are being ignored by the Bush Administration and the financial industry in general. This plan becomes the American Home Ownership Preservation Act of 2007, which, among other things, would have provided for appropriations for mortgage fraud enforcement and prosecution and amended the Truth in Lending Act to require certain mortgage originators or lenders with primary responsibility for underwriting an assessment on a home mortgage loan to include a borrower's ability to repay certain associated costs.
  - August 8: Mortgage Guaranty Insurance Corporation (MGIC, Milwaukee, Wisconsin) announces it will discontinue its purchase of Radian Group after suffering a billion-dollar loss of its investment in Credit-Based Asset Servicing and Securitization (C-BASS, New York]).
  - August 9: August 9: French investment bank BNP Paribas suspends three investment funds that invested in subprime mortgage debt due to a "complete evaporation of liquidity". in the market. The bank's announcement is the first of many credit-loss and write-down announcements by banks, mortgage lenders and other institutional investors, as subprime assets went bad, due to defaults by subprime mortgage payers. This announcement compels the intervention of the European Central Bank, pumping 95 billion euros into the European banking market.
  - August 10: Central banks coordinate efforts to increase liquidity for first time following the September 11 attacks. The United States Federal Reserve (Fed) injects a combined US$43 billion, the European Central Bank (ECB) 156 billion euros (US$214.6 billion), and the Bank of Japan 1 trillion Yen (US$8.4 billion). Smaller amounts come from the central banks of Australia, and Canada.
  - August 14: Sentinel Management Group suspends redemptions for investors and sells off $312 million worth of assets; three days later Sentinel files for Chapter 11 bankruptcy protection. US and European stock indices continue to fall.
  - August 15: The stock of Countrywide Financial, which is the largest mortgage lender in the United States, falls around 13% on the New York Stock Exchange after Countrywide says foreclosures and mortgage delinquencies have risen to their highest levels since early 2002.
  - August 16: Countrywide Financial Corporation, the biggest U.S. mortgage lender, narrowly avoids bankruptcy by taking out an emergency loan of $11 billion from a group of banks.
  - August 17: The Federal Reserve cuts the discount rate by half a percent to 5.75% from 6.25% while leaving the federal funds rate unchanged in an attempt to stabilize financial markets.
  - August 31: President Bush announces a limited bailout of U.S. homeowners unable to pay the rising costs of their debts. Ameriquest, once the largest subprime lender in the U.S., goes out of business;
  - September 1–3: Fed Economic Symposium in Jackson Hole, WY addressed the housing recession that jeopardizes U.S. growth. Several critics argue that the Fed should use regulation and interest rates to prevent asset-price bubbles, blamed former Fed-chairman Alan Greenspan's low interest rate policies for stoking the U.S. housing boom and subsequent bust, and Yale University economist Robert Shiller warned of possible home price declines of fifty percent.
  - September 4: The Libor rate rises to its highest level since December 1998, at 6.7975%, above the Bank of England's 5.75% base rate.
  - September 6: The Federal Reserve adds $31.25 billion in temporary reserves (loans) to the US money markets which has to be repaid in two weeks.
  - September 7: US Labor Department announces that non-farm payrolls fell by 4,000 in August 2007, the first month of negative job growth since August 2003, due in large part to problems in the housing and credit markets.
  - September 12: Citibank borrows $3.375 billion from the Fed discount window, prompting then-President of the Federal Reserve Bank of NY Timothy Geithner to call the CFO of Citibank. Over four days in late August and early September, foreign banks borrowed almost $1.7 billion through the discount window.
  - September 14: Northern Rock approaches Bank of England for assistance, triggering a run on its deposits.
  - September 17: Former Fed Chairman Alan Greenspan said "we had a bubble in housing" and warns of "large double digit declines" in home values "larger than most people expect."
  - September 18: The Fed lowers interest rates by half a point (0.5%) in an attempt to limit damage to the economy from the housing and credit crises.
  - September 27: Senator Hillary Clinton introduces the American Home Ownership Preservation Act of 2007 in the Senate. The bill is read twice and then referred to the Committee on Banking, Housing, and Urban Affairs. No further action is reported.
  - September 28: Television finance personality Jim Cramer warns Americans on The Today Show, "don't you dare buy a home—you'll lose money," causing a furor among realtors.
  - September 30: Affected by the spiraling mortgage and credit crises, Internet banking pioneer NetBank goes bankrupt, and the Swiss bank UBS announces that it lost US$690 million in the third quarter.
  - October 5: Merrill Lynch announces a US$5.5 billion loss, revised to $8.4 billion on October 24, a sum that credit rating firm Standard & Poor's called "startling".
  - October 10: Hope Now Alliance is created by the US Government and private industry to help some sub-prime borrowers.
  - October 15–17: A consortium of U.S. banks backed by the U.S. government announces a "super fund" of $100 billion to purchase mortgage-backed securities whose mark-to-market value plummeted in the subprime collapse. Both Fed chairman Ben Bernanke and Treasury Secretary Hank Paulson express alarm about the dangers posed by the bursting housing bubble; Paulson says "the housing decline is still unfolding and I view it as the most significant risk to our economy. … The longer housing prices remain stagnant or fall, the greater the penalty to our future economic growth."
  - October 31: Federal Reserve lowers the federal funds rate by 25 basis points to 4.5%.
  - End of October: Merrill Lynch's board fires Stan O'Neal for trying to sell the company; they hire John Thain who winds up having to sell it for a much lower price a year later.
  - November 1: Federal Reserve injects $41B into the money supply for banks to borrow at a low rate. The largest single expansion by the Fed since $50.35B on September 19, 2001.
  - November 15: Financial Accounting Standards Board "Fair Value Measurements" standards upgrade the quality of financial reporting through greater transparency. However, this "mark-to-market" accounting may exaggerate the loss in value of an asset, as shown on balance sheets, and trigger a cascade of unnecessary financial losses.
  - December 6: President Bush announces a plan to voluntarily and temporarily freeze the mortgages of a limited number of mortgage debtors holding adjustable rate mortgages (ARM). He also asked Members Of Congress to: 1. pass legislation to modernize the FHA. 2. temporarily reform the tax code to help homeowners refinance during this time of housing market stress. 3. pass funding to support mortgage counseling. 4. pass legislation to reform Government Sponsored Enterprises (GSEs) like Freddie Mac and Fannie Mae.
  - December 24: A consortium of banks officially abandons the U.S. government-supported "super-SIV" mortgage crisis bail-out plan announced in mid-October, citing a lack of demand for the risky mortgage products on which the plan was based, and widespread criticism that the fund was a flawed idea that would have been difficult to execute.

== 2008 ==
=== 2008 in general ===
The monoline insurance companies (AMBAC, MBIA, ACA, &c) have written vast quantities of insurance against the failure of CDO tranches. Those tranches now begin to fail by the hundreds. The credit ratings agencies downgrade the monolines from AAA, but the monolines have a unique business model. If they don't have a AAA rating, then their main line of business (municipal bond insurance for city infrastructure projects) becomes impossible for them to perform. By 2009, the monolines have all crashed.

=== January 2008 to August 2008 ===
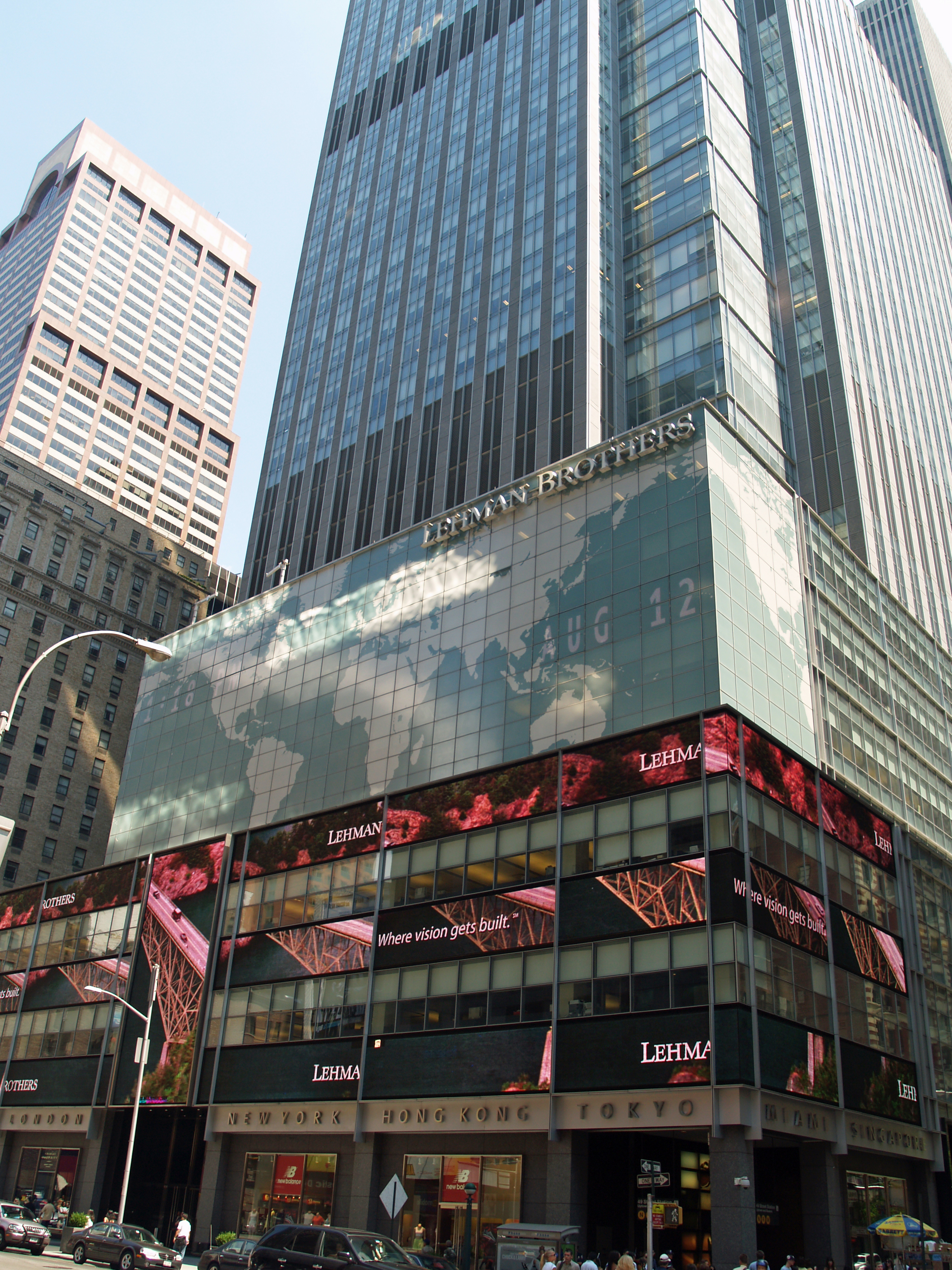
The New York City headquarters of Lehman Brothers.

Financial crisis escalates with collapse of major lenders and investors.

  - January 2–21: January 2008 stock market downturn.
  - January 24: The National Association of Realtors (NAR) announces that 2007 had the largest drop in existing home sales in 25 years, and "the first price decline in many, many years and possibly going back to the Great Depression."
  - February 7: The market for auction rate securities freezes up—investors decline to bid.
  - March 1–June 18: 406 people are arrested for mortgage fraud in an FBI sting across the U.S., including buyers, sellers and others across the wide-ranging mortgage industry.
  - March 10: Dow Jones Industrial Average at the lowest level since October 2006, falling more than 20% from its peak just five months prior.
  - March 14: Bear Stearns gets Fed funding as shares plummet.
  - March 16: Bear Stearns is acquired for $2 a share by JPMorgan Chase in a fire sale avoiding bankruptcy. The deal is backed by the Federal Reserve, providing up to $30B to cover possible Bear Stearn losses.
  - May 6: UBS AG Swiss bank announces plans to cut 5500 jobs by the middle of 2009.
  - June 18: As the chairman of the Senate Banking Committee Connecticut's Christopher Dodd proposes a housing bailout to the Senate floor that would assist troubled subprime mortgage lenders such as Countrywide Bank, Dodd admitted that he received special treatment, perks, and campaign donations from Countrywide, who regarded Dodd as a "special" customer and a "Friend of Angelo". Dodd received a $75,000 reduction in mortgage payments from Countrywide. The Chairman of the Senate Finance Committee Kent Conrad and the head of Fannie Mae Jim Johnson also received mortgages on favorable terms due to their association with Countrywide CEO Angelo R. Mozilo.
  - June 19: Cioffi and Tannin, managers of the Bear Stearns CDO hedge funds that crashed in 2007, are arrested by the Federal Bureau of Investigation. They are accused of misrepresenting their funds true condition to investors; both are acquitted.
  - July 11 Indymac Bank, a subsidiary of Independent National Mortgage Corporation (Indymac), is placed into the receivership of the Federal Deposit Insurance Corporation by the Office of Thrift Supervision. It was the fourth-largest bank failure in United States history, and the second-largest failure of a regulated thrift. Before its failure, IndyMac Bank was the largest savings and loan association in the Los Angeles area and the seventh-largest mortgage originator in the United States.
  - July 14: Barney Frank characterizes future prospects of Fannie Mae and Freddie Mac as "solid" going forward.
  - July 17: Major banks and financial institutions had borrowed and invested heavily in mortgage backed securities and reported losses of approximately $435 billion as of 17 July 2008.
  - July 30: President Bush signs into law the Housing and Economic Recovery Act of 2008, which authorizes the Federal Housing Administration to guarantee up to $300 billion in new 30-year fixed rate mortgages for subprime borrowers if lenders write-down principal loan balances to 90 percent of current appraisal value.

=== September 2008 ===
  - September 7: Federal takeover of Fannie Mae and Freddie Mac, which at that point owned or guaranteed about half of the U.S.'s $12 trillion mortgage market, effectively nationalizing them. This causes panic because almost every home mortgage lender and Wall Street bank relied on them to facilitate the mortgage market and investors worldwide owned $5.2 trillion of debt securities backed by them.
  - September 14: Merrill Lynch is sold to Bank of America amidst fears of a liquidity crisis and Lehman Brothers collapses after bids to purchase the company by Bank of America and Barclays fail.
  - September 15: Lehman Brothers files for Chapter 11 bankruptcy protection, holding $613 billion in assets. It remains the largest bankruptcy filing in US history.
  - September 16: Moody's and Standard and Poor's downgrade ratings on AIG's credit on concerns over continuing losses to mortgage-backed securities, sending the company into fears of insolvency. In addition, the Reserve Primary Fund "breaks the buck" leading to a run on the money market funds. Over $140 billion is withdrawn vs. $7 billion the week prior. This leads to problems for the commercial paper market, a key source of funding for corporations, which suddenly could not get funds or had to pay much higher interest rates.
  - September 17: The US Federal Reserve lends $85 billion to American International Group (AIG) to avoid bankruptcy.
  - September 18: Treasury Secretary Henry Paulson and Fed Chairman Ben Bernanke meet with key legislators to propose a $700 billion emergency bailout through the purchase of toxic assets. Bernanke tells them: "If we don't do this, we may not have an economy on Monday."
  - September 19: Paulson financial rescue plan is unveiled after a volatile week in stock and debt markets.
  - September 23: The Federal Bureau of Investigation discloses that it had been investigating the possibility of fraud by mortgage financing companies Fannie Mae and Freddie Mac, Lehman Brothers, and insurer American International Group, bringing to 26 the number of corporate lenders under investigation.
  - September 25: Washington Mutual is seized by the Federal Deposit Insurance Corporation, and its banking assets are sold to JP MorganChase for $1.9 billion.
  - September 29: Emergency Economic Stabilization Act is defeated 228–205 in the United States House of Representatives; Federal Deposit Insurance Corporation announces that Citigroup Inc. would acquire banking operations of Wachovia.
  - September 30: US Treasury changes tax law to allow a bank acquiring another to write off all of the acquired bank's losses for tax purposes

=== October 2008 ===
  - October 1: The U.S. Senate passes HR1424, their version of the $700 billion bailout bill.
  - October 1: The financial crisis spreads to Europe.
  - October 3: President George W. Bush signs the Emergency Economic Stabilization Act, creating a $700 billion Troubled Assets Relief Program to purchase failing bank assets. It contains easing of the accounting rules that forced companies to collapse because of the existence of toxic mortgage-related investments. Also key to winning GOP support was a decision by the Securities and Exchange Commission to ease mark-to-market accounting rules that require financial institutions to show the deflated value of assets on their balance sheets."
  - October 3: Using tax law change made September 30, Wells makes a higher offer for Wachovia, scooping it from Citigroup
  - October 6–10: Worst week for the stock market in 75 years. The Dow Jones loses 22.1 percent, its worst week on record, down 40.3 percent since reaching a record high of 14,164.53 October 9, 2007. The Standard & Poor's 500 index loses 18.2 percent, its worst week since 1933, down 42.5 percent in since its own high October 9, 2007.
  - October 6: Fed announces that it will provide $900 billion in short-term cash loans to banks.
  - October 7: Fed makes emergency move to lend around $1.3 trillion directly to companies outside the financial sector.
  - October 7: The Internal Revenue Service (IRS) relaxes rules on US corporations repatriating money held overseas in an attempt to inject liquidity into the US financial market. The new ruling allows the companies to receive loans from their foreign subsidiaries for longer periods and more times a year without triggering the 35% corporate income tax.
  - October 8: Central banks in USA (Fed), England, China, Canada, Sweden, Switzerland and the European Central Bank cut rates in a coordinated effort to aid world economy.
  - October 8: Fed also reduces its emergency lending rate to banks by half a percentage point, to 1.75 percent.
  - October 8: White House considers taking ownership stakes in private banks as a part of the bailout bill. Warren Buffett and George Soros criticized the original approach of the bailout bill.
  - October 11: The Dow Jones Industrial Average caps its worst week ever with its highest volatility day ever recorded in its 112-year history. Over the last eight trading days, the DJIA has dropped 22% amid worries of worsening credit crisis and global recession. Paper losses now on US stocks now total $8.4 trillion from the market highs of the previous year.
  - October 11: The G7, a group of central bankers and finance ministers from the Group of Seven leading economies, meet in Washington and agree to urgent and exceptional coordinated action to prevent the credit crisis from throwing the world into depression. The G7 did not agree on the concrete plan that was hoped for.
  - October 14: Following a model initiated by the United Kingdom bank rescue package announced on October 8, the US taps into the $700 billion available from the Emergency Economic Stabilization Act and announces the injection of $250 billion of public money into the US banking system. The form of the rescue will include the US government taking an equity position in banks that choose to participate in the program in exchange for certain restrictions such as executive compensation. Nine banks agreed to participate in the program and will receive half of the total funds: 1) Bank of America, 2) JPMorgan Chase, 3) Wells Fargo, 4) Citigroup, 5) Merrill Lynch, 6) Goldman Sachs, 7) Morgan Stanley, 8) Bank of New York Mellon and 9) State Street. Other US financial institutions eligible for the plan have until November 14 to agree to the terms.
  - October 21: The US Federal Reserve announces that it will spend $540 billion to purchase short-term debt from money market mutual funds. The large amount of redemption requests during the credit crisis have caused the money market funds to scale back lending to banks contributing to the credit freeze on interbank lending markets. This government is hoping the injection will help unfreeze the credit markets making it easier for businesses and banks to obtain loans. The structure of the plan involves the Fed setting up four special purpose vehicles that will purchase the assets.

=== November 2008 ===
  - November 4: Federal Reserve loans $133 billion through various credit facilities, 39% of which goes to two foreign institutions-German Irish Bank Depfa and Dexia Credit of Belgium.
  - November 12: Treasury Secretary Paulson abandons plan to buy toxic assets under the $700 billion Troubled Asset Relief Program (TARP). Mr. Paulson said the remaining $410 billion in the fund would be better spent on recapitalizing financial companies.
  - November 15: The group of 20 of the world's largest economies meets in Washington DC and releases a statement of the meeting. Although no detailed plans were agreed upon, the meeting focused on implementing policies consistent with five principles: strengthening transparency and accountability, improving regulation, promoting market integrity, reinforcing cooperation and reforming international institutions.
  - November 17: The Treasury gives out $33.6 billion to 21 banks in the second round of disbursements from the $700 billion bailout fund. This payout brings the total to $158.56 billion so far.
  - November 24: The US government agrees to rescue Citigroup after an attack by investors causes the stock price to plummet 60% over the last week under a detailed plan that including injecting another $20 billion of capital into Citigroup bringing the total infusion to $45 billion.
  - November 25: The US Federal Reserve pledges $800 billion more to help revive the financial system. $600 billion will be used to buy mortgage bonds issued or guaranteed by Fannie Mae, Freddie Mac, and the Federal Home Loan Banks.
  - November 28: The Bank for International Settlements (BIS), the global organization behind the Basel Accord, issues a consultative paper providing supervisory guidance on the valuation of assets. The paper provides ten principles that should be used by banks to value assets at fair market value.

== 2010 ==
- April 16: The Securities and Exchange Commission sues Goldman Sachs for fraud, for allegedly having failed to disclose vital information to investors in one of its "Abacus" mortgage-backed CDOs in 2007. The CDO was allegedly 'designed to fail' by the hedge fund of John Paulson, so that Paulson could make large profits by betting against it. Allegedly this was not disclosed to investors by Goldman, and they lost roughly a billion dollars, while Paulson & Co profited.
- October: A foreclosures crisis occurs due to many foreclosures being carried out even without the necessary paper-work being in place, instead relying on "robo-signing" of the legal documents. Many demand that all foreclosures be halted nationwide until the systemic issues of extrajudicial practices have come under control.

== 2011 ==
January

The U.S. Financial Crisis Inquiry Commission reported its findings in January 2011. It concluded that "the crisis was avoidable and was caused by: Widespread failures in financial regulation, including the Federal Reserve’s failure to stem the tide of toxic mortgages; Dramatic breakdowns in corporate governance including too many financial firms acting recklessly and taking on too much risk; An explosive mix of excessive borrowing and risk by households and Wall Street that put the financial system on a collision course with crisis; Key policy makers ill prepared for the crisis, lacking a full understanding of the financial system they oversaw; and systemic breaches in accountability and ethics at all levels.“

April

The US Senate Permanent Committee on Investigations releases the Levin-Coburn report, "Wall Street and the Financial Crisis: Anatomy of a Financial Collapse". It presents new details about the activities of Goldman Sachs, Deutsche Bank, Moody's, and other companies preceding the financial crisis.

Former NY Governor Eliot Spitzer says that if the Attorney General cannot bring a case against Goldman Sachs, after the revelations of the Levin-Coburn report, then he should resign.

== See also ==
- Credit rating agencies and the subprime crisis
- Global financial crisis in September 2008
- Global financial crisis in October 2008
- Global financial crisis in November 2008
- Global financial crisis in December 2008
- Global financial crisis in 2009
- Timeline of the 2000s United States housing bubble for the pre-subprime crisis timeline
