= Countrywide Financial political loan scandal =

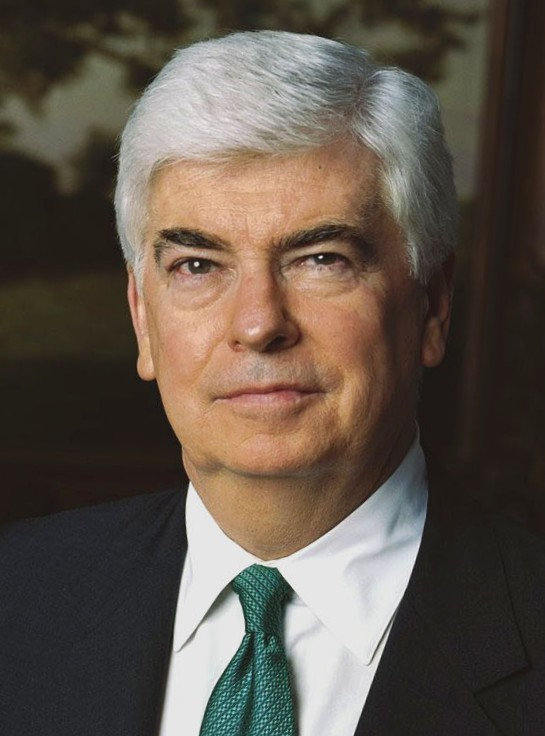
Chairman of the Senate Banking Committee Christopher Dodd (D-CT)

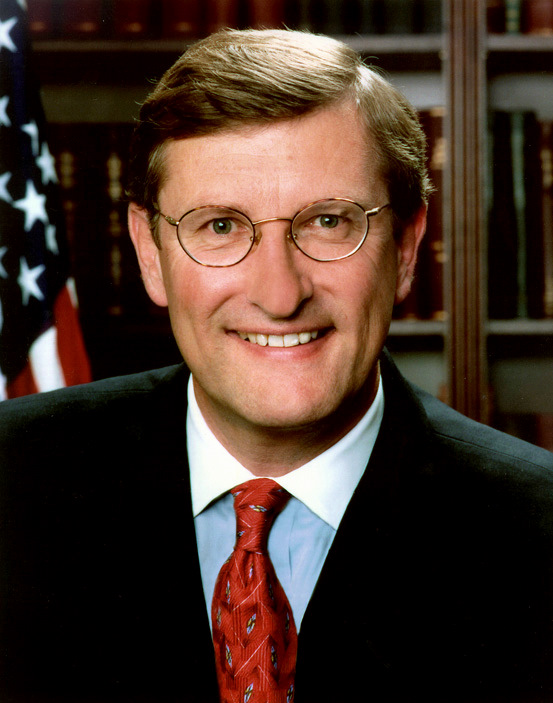
Chairman of the Senate Budget Committee Kent Conrad (D-ND)

The Countrywide financial political loan scandal in 2008-2009 involved U.S. politicians who allegedly received favorable mortgage rates.

In June 2008 Conde Nast Portfolio reported that numerous Washington, DC politicians over recent years had received mortgage financing at noncompetitive rates at Countrywide Financial because the corporation placed the officeholders in a program called "FOA's"--"Friends of Angelo", Countrywide's Chief Executive Angelo Mozilo. The politicians extended such favorable financing included the chairman of the Senate Banking Committee, Christopher Dodd (D-CT), and the chairman of the Senate Budget Committee, Kent Conrad (D-ND). The article also noted Countrywide's political action committee had made large donations to Dodd's campaign. The largest recipient of campaign contributions from Countrywide, though, was Rep. Ed Royce (R-CA), House Financial Services Committee), who has received $37,500 since 1989. Dodd has advocated that the federal government, through the Federal Housing Administration, insure up to $300 billion in refinanced mortgages for distressed homeowners.

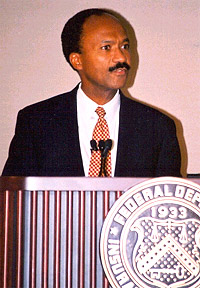
Franklin Raines, then Chairman and Chief Executive Officer of Fannie Mae, on July 31, 2002

It was reported by The Wall Street Journal on 6 June 2008 that two former CEOs of Fannie Mae, Franklin Raines and James A. Johnson, who was also an adviser to then-Democratic presidential candidate Barack Obama, had received loans from Countrywide. On July 16, 2008, The Washington Post reported that Franklin Raines had "taken calls from Barack Obama's presidential campaign seeking his advice on mortgage and housing policy matters." However, Raines and the Obama campaign both allege that Raines has never advised Obama. See Raines and Obama.

On 18 June 2008, a Congressional ethics panel started examining allegations that Democratic Senators Christopher Dodd of Connecticut (the sponsor of a major $300 billion housing rescue bill) and Kent Conrad of North Dakota received preferential loans by troubled mortgage lender Countrywide Financial Corp.

Dodd has faced criticism for his role in this scandal from Connecticut's largest newspaper, the Hartford Courant as well as from the Connecticut Republican party. Citizens Against Government Waste (CAGW) named Dodd its June 2008 "Porker of the Month" for accepting a preferential mortgage deal from Countrywide Financial which stands to benefit from a mortgage bill he is pushing through Congress.

On January 6, 2010, Dodd announced that he would not run for re-election.

On January 18, 2011, Conrad announced that he would not run for re-election in 2012, but would retire.

== See also ==
- Friends of Angelo program
