= Grayton Mortgage =

American mortgage provider

Grayton Mortgage, Inc.
- Company type: Private
- Industry: Mortgage
- Founded: 2013
- Founder: Kevin Leibowitz
- Headquarters: New York City, United States
- Services: Mortgage financing

Grayton Mortgage, Inc. is an American mortgage provider offering financing products and services to customers in the United States. The company is headquartered in New York City and has offices in North Carolina and California.

== History ==
Grayton Mortgage was founded in 2013 with the goal of assisting clients who have been underserved in the lending market. The company was founded by Kevin Leibowitz, a financial mortgage market analyst. Before founding the company, he worked on Wall Street as an analyst and trader of mortgage securities at Bear Stearns, Countrywide, Deutsche Bank and S&P. Leibowitz frequently shares his insights through various media outlets, providing a perspective on mortgage trends and lending practices.

In 2024, Grayton Mortgage was ranked among the top 20 mortgage companies in New York City by Expertise.com, a service discovery platform in Los Angeles. The company was also honored as the "Best Mortgage Broker" in New York City and Raleigh.
