= David Loeb =

David Loeb may refer to:

- David Loeb (composer) (born 1939), American composer
- David S. Loeb (1924–2003), cofounder and former chairman of Countrywide Financial and IndyMac Bank
- David Loeb (Canadian businessman) (1924–2016), owner of the Ottawa Rough Riders, 1969–77
