= John M. Reich =

American banker

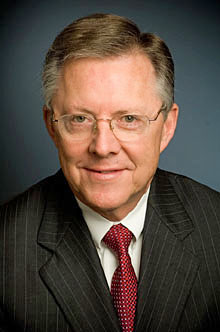

Director of the Office of Thrift Supervision
- In office August 9, 2005 – February 27, 2009
- President: George W. Bush; Barack Obama
- Succeeded by: OTS Chief Counsel John Bowman (acting)

Personal details
- Party: Republican
- Education: Southern Illinois University
- Profession: Banker

John M. Reich was a Director of the Federal Deposit Insurance Corporation (FDIC). He was sworn in on January 15, 2001, following an appointment by President of the United States Bill Clinton and served on the FDIC Board for eight years. Reich served as Vice Chairman of the Board of the FDIC from November 2002 until he was nominated on June 7, 2005 by President George W. Bush to be Director of the Office of Thrift Supervision (OTS), and the U.S. Senate confirmed his nomination on July 29, 2005. He also served as Acting Chairman of the FDIC from July to August 2001. As Deputy Chairman, 2001–2005, Reich served as the Chair of FDIC's Audit Committee during a time when the General Accounting Office issued reportable conditions regarding information security at the Corporation.

Reich took the oath of Director of OTS on August 9, 2005 and continued in that capacity as well as serving as a member of the FDIC Board of Directors until he resigned on February 12, 2009 and stepped down February 27, 2009.

== OTS during and after Reich ==
Under Director Reich, the Office of Thrift Supervision saw the failure or near-failure of at least five major institutions - IndyMac Bank, AIG, Washington Mutual, Downey Financial and Countrywide Financial. These constituted some of the largest financial failures in modern history to that point. OTS later acknowledged that in the case of AIG it failed to take regulatory actions it should appropriately have taken as early as 2004. In the case of IndyMac, after Director Reich and OTS both denied responsibility for the failure, the Office of Inspector General of the United States Treasury found that OTS both inappropriately failed to act and inappropriately and knowingly allowed regulatory misconduct.

On June 17, 2009, President Barack Obama announced his intention to disband the Office of Thrift Supervision as part of a program of regulatory reform, citing "loopholes that have allowed important institutions to cherry-pick among banking rules".

== Career highlights ==
Prior to coming to Washington, D.C., Reich spent 23 years as a community banker in Illinois and Florida, including 10 years as president and CEO of the National Bank of Sarasota, in Sarasota, Florida, which he led as it grew from a two-office, $17 million institution to a $450 million institution with 19 offices.

Reflecting on his community banking experience, Reich, then Director of OTS, said in remarks to the New York Bankers Association, New York, NY, April 6, 2006:

I am deeply concerned that community banks will continue to disappear from our landscape, with local communities and consumers across the country being the ultimate losers. The loss of these community human resources not only impacts local banking relationships with small businesses and individuals, it reduces human resources available for leadership of community service organizations on which senior bank officers and their directors serve. There is an unquantified social cost to industry consolidation that is attributable to the weight of accumulated regulatory burden. This is a growing problem in communities across the country, with implications that are largely ignored by policymakers.

Reich also served 12 years on the staff of U.S. Senator Connie Mack (R-FL), before joining the FDIC. From 1998 through 2000, he was Senator Mack's Chief of Staff, directing and overseeing all of the Senator's offices and committee activities, including those at the Senate Banking Committee.

== Regulation and reform ==
An opponent of bureaucratic red tape, Reich spent considerable time and testimony trying to alleviate the burden of regulation on banks, including heading an inter-agency review of all federal regulations on banks for three years starting in 2005, as required by the Economic Growth and Regulatory Paperwork Reduction Act of 1996. As head of OTS, Reich strongly advocated greater regulatory autonomy for his own agency.

On April 6, 2006, Reich voiced his concern that banks were allowing an overall slippage in underwriting due to increased competition in certain market segments and geographical areas as banks tried to feed loan volumes after the real estate market peaked. He also cited the increased sales of alternative or nontraditional mortgage lending products like "interest-only" and "pay option" adjustable rate mortgage (ARMs). These loan products were legitimate and valuable, according to Reich, suggesting the main danger was from institutions with limited experience in these loans and managing the associated risks, particularly the inherent credit risks. However, of the five leading issuers of option adjustable-rate mortgages, three — IndyMac Bank, Washington Mutual and Downey Financial — would fail. Countrywide Financial, the largest, was forced to sell itself to Bank of America for a small fraction of its previous value or fail. AIG Financial Products, regulated by OTS, would also fail, . AIG FP was a major issuer of Credit Default Swaps related to the securitized, outstanding interest of these and other subprime loans.

On July 21, 2008, following the failure of IndyMac but before the failures of Washington Mutual, AIG and Downey Financial, Reich described his agency's "Financial Institution Reform Initiative":

I believe Congress should help create a level, scrupulous and well-regulated playing field so consumers and investors have confidence in the transparency, fairness and integrity of all mortgage originations. The standards of the under-regulated segments of the market must be raised to the level followed by the federally regulated segments. All entities that originate home loans should be required to comply with basic credit principles, such as conducting a reasonable assessment of each borrower's ability to repay.

In those same remarks, he described the role he felt his agency should play:

Selecting a strong regulator to monitor this new level playing field is critical for protecting consumers and restoring market confidence. I won't pretend to be a disinterested party, but I know that the OTS has the most extensive expertise of any regulatory agency in the oversight and supervision of mortgage banking operations and I believe the OTS is in the best position to assume federal authority to regulate the currently unregulated players in mortgage banking.

== Role In IndyMac Bank controversy ==
The failure of IndyMac Bank on July 11, 2008, was the fourth largest bank failure in United States history. Prior to IndyMac's failure on July 11, 2008, the bank had come to rely heavily on higher cost, less stable, brokered deposits, as well as secured borrowings, to fund its operations. The bank had focused on stated income and other aggressively underwritten loans in areas with rapidly escalating home prices, particularly in California and Florida.

On June 26, 2008, Senator Charles E. Schumer publicly released letters he had previously sent to Reich's agency and others, suggesting that IndyMac bank was in danger of failing and that the danger was being ignored. In the weeks that followed, Director Reich blamed Schumer's release of the letters for instigating IndyMac's collapse.

On July 21, 2008, Reich described "interference with the regulatory process by reporting and disseminating speculation about the condition of financial institutions, thereby undermining public confidence in those institutions and causing serious harm" as a contributor to the failure of IndyMac as well as Fannie Mae, Freddie Mac and Lehman Brothers.

On December 22, 2008, Reich removed his agency's western director, Darrel W. Dochow for allowing IndyMac to backdate a capital infusion of $18 million from its parent company so that the bank would appear "well capitalized" in its 10-Q for the period ending March 31, 2008. According to a source with knowledge of the incident, at another point Mr. Dochow limited the scope of a review by OTS regulators of IndyMac's portfolio of loans and other assets, overruling the advice of others in the agency. Mr. Dochow played a central role in the savings-and-loan scandal of the 1980s, overriding a recommendation by federal bank examiners in San Francisco to seize Lincoln Savings, the giant savings and loan owned by Charles Keating. Mr. Reich called the backdating irregularity "a relatively small factor" in the collapse of IndyMac.

On February 12, 2009, Reich resigned, announcing he would step down February 27.

On February 26, 2009, the Treasury Department's inspector general released a report citing laxity at the OTS under Reich for adding significantly to the $10.7 billion in FDIC losses from the IndyMac failure, as well as the estimated $270 million in losses suffered by uninsured depositors. The report concluded that, under the law, OTS should have taken Prompt Corrective Action against IndyMac in May, 2008.

Commenting on the report, Inspector General Eric Thorson dismissed Reich's claim that Senator Schumer's letters caused the failure. Marla Freedman, the assistant inspector general for audit, detailed a pattern of excess risk-taking and abuse of the lending process at IndyMac and the OTS's consistent and concurrent failure to act. Mr. Reich said in a letter to the inspector general that he agreed with the agency's filings.

On February 27, 2009, Reich stepped down amidst the continuing audit of backdating at IndyMac and four other institutions. Scott Polakoff, OTS senior deputy director and chief operating officer, hired under Mr. Reich, became acting director on his departure.

On March 26, 2009, Polakoff was removed and placed on leave by United States Secretary of the Treasury Timothy Geithner, amidst an announced further review and investigation of the backdating scandal by the U.S. Treasury's Inspector General.

== Role in AIG Controversy ==
In a May 2006 congressional hearing, Reich addressed the issue of OTS's regulating of international financial holding companies through its special office of Complex and International Organizations. Reich said he was working to ensure that the financial companies under his watch wouldn't be burdened by added "regulatory scrutiny" in Europe. Among other things, he said the OTS designation meant U.S. companies operating in Europe could avoid testing "the qualifications of key personnel" and requirements to keep more cash and assets in reserve to cushion against losses.

In a March 2007 report on financial regulation, the Government Accountability Office looked at the OTS and found "a disparity between the size of the agency and the diverse firms it oversees." The report noted a lack of specialized skills at the OTS, which had just one insurance specialist to oversee several insurers such as AIG.

In March 2008, Acting Director Polakoff admitted told a U.S. Senate panel that the Office of Thrift Supervision "fell short" in its oversight of American International Group Inc. Polakoff admitted that the regulator "did not sufficiently assess the susceptibility of highly illiquid, complex instruments," to ratings downgrades and "should have directed the company to stop originating credit-default swap products before December 2005." In response to a Senator Mel Martinez's remark that OTS might be "the regulator that we've been looking for", Polakoff acknowledged that OTS was "the one".

== Civic activities ==
Reich's community service includes serving as chairman of the board of trustees of a public hospital facility in Ft. Myers, Florida, and chairman of the board of directors of the Sarasota Family YMCA. He has also served as a board member for a number of civic organizations, and was active for many years in youth baseball programs in Sarasota, FL. In Washington, DC, Reich has served as an elder and trustee of the National Presbyterian Church, and chairman of the National Presbyterian Church Fund for Charitable Giving. In March 2009, he became a member of the board of directors of the Senior Housing Crime Prevention Foundation.

== Education ==
Reich holds a B.S. degree from Southern Illinois University and an M.B.A. from the University of South Florida. He is also a graduate of Louisiana State University's School of Banking of the South.
