= Franklin Raines =

American businessman (born 1949)

Frank Raines
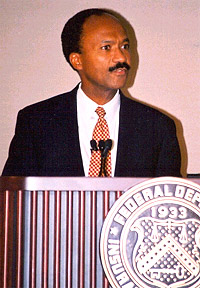
- Raines in 2002

31st Director of the Office of Management and Budget
- In office April 13, 1996 – May 21, 1998
- President: Bill Clinton
- Preceded by: Alice Rivlin
- Succeeded by: Jack Lew

Personal details
- Born: Franklin Delano Raines; January 14, 1949 (age 77) Seattle, Washington, U.S.
- Party: Democratic
- Education: Harvard University (BA, JD); Magdalen College, Oxford

Franklin Delano Raines (born January 14, 1949), known as Frank Raines, is an American business executive. He is the former chairman and chief executive officer of the Federal National Mortgage Association, commonly known as Fannie Mae, who served as White House budget director under President Bill Clinton. His role leading Fannie Mae has come under scrutiny. He has been called one of the "25 People to Blame for the Financial Crisis" according to Time magazine.

== Early life ==
Raines was born in Seattle, Washington, the son of a janitor. Raines graduated from Harvard College, Harvard Law School; and Magdalen College, Oxford University, as a Rhodes Scholar.

== Career ==
In 1969, Raines first worked in national politics, preparing a report for the Nixon administration on the causes and patterns of youth unrest around the country related to the Vietnam War. He served in the Carter Administration as associate director for economics and government in the Office of Management and Budget and assistant director of the White House Domestic Policy Staff from 1977 to 1979. Then he joined Lazard Freres and Co., where he worked for 11 years and became a general partner. In 1991 he became Fannie's Mae's vice chairman, a post he left in 1996 in order to join the Clinton Administration as the director of the U.S. Office of Management and Budget, where he served until 1998. In 1999, he returned to Fannie Mae as CEO.

On December 21, 2004, Raines accepted what he called "early retirement" from his position as CEO while U.S. Securities and Exchange Commission investigators continued to investigate alleged accounting irregularities. He was accused by The Office of Federal Housing Enterprise Oversight (OFHEO), the regulating body of Fannie Mae, of abetting widespread accounting errors, which included the shifting of losses so senior executives, such as himself, could earn large bonuses.

In 2006, the OFHEO announced a suit against Raines in order to recover some or all of the $90 million in payments made to Raines based on the overstated earnings, initially estimated to be $9 billion but have been announced as $6.3 billion.

Civil charges were filed against Raines and two other former executives by the OFHEO in which the OFHEO sought $110 million in penalties and $115 million in returned bonuses from the three accused. On April 18, 2008, the government announced a settlement with Raines together with J. Timothy Howard, Fannie's former chief financial officer, and Leanne G. Spencer, Fannie's former controller dismissing its charges. The three executives maintained their denial of the charges but agreed to the payment of fines totaling about $3 million, which were paid by Fannie's insurance policies. Raines also agreed to donate to charity the proceeds from the sale of $1.8 million of his Fannie stock newly issued to him by the company and to give up stock options, which were valued at $15.6 million when issued. The stock options however had no value. The OFHEO press release said Raines also gave up an estimated $5.3 million of "other benefits" said to be related to his pension and forgone bonuses. Raines denied that he gave up any such benefits or paid any money out of pocket for the settlement.

A 2008 editorial in The Wall Street Journal called it a "paltry settlement" which allowed Raines and the other two executives to "keep the bulk of their riches". In 2003 alone, Raines's compensation was over $20 million.

A statement issued by Raines said of the consent order, it "is consistent with my acceptance of accountability as the leader of Fannie Mae and with my strong denial of the allegations made against me by OFHEO".

The OFHEO charges were repeated in a class action securities fraud lawsuit filed on September 23, 2004, by the Ohio Attorney General on behalf of Ohio state pension funds and other investors. On September 20, 2012, Federal District Court Judge Richard Leon granted summary judgment to Raines and dismissed him from the suit. The judge noted that over its eight-year history "the parties produced nearly 67 million pages of documents, deposed 123 fact witnesses, and engaged 35 expert witnesses". Despite all of that discovery, Judge Leon found, "plaintiffs have not identified any evidence that Raines knew or, indeed had any reason to know, that Fannie Mae's accounting violated GAAP (Generally Accepted Accounting Principles). Further, plaintiffs have not identified any evidence that Raines intentionally misled investors through his statements concerning the implementation and operation of these accounting policies." The judge also refused to give any credence to the original OFHEO reports. He wrote, "the OFHEO reports were part of an effort to prepare administrative charges against the individual defendants and raise substantial questions of trustworthiness." (Memorandum Opinion September 20, 2012, Judge Richard Leon, United States District Court for the District of Columbia, In re Fannie Mae Securities Litigation MDL No. 1668, Consolidated Civil Action No. 04-1639)

In a settlement with OFHEO and the Securities and Exchange Commission, Fannie paid a record $400 million civil fine. Fannie, which is the largest American financier and guarantor of home mortgages, also agreed to make changes in its corporate culture and accounting procedures and ways of managing risk. The SEC and the Justice Department never brought any charges against Raines.

In June 2008, The Wall Street Journal reported that Franklin Raines was one of several people who may have received below market rates loans at Countrywide Financial because the corporation considered the officeholders "FOA's"--"Friends of Angelo" (Countrywide Chief Executive Angelo Mozilo). But the article acknowledged that it had insufficient data to confirm whether the rates were below market. He received loans for over $3 million while CEO of Fannie Mae. Raines has denied that he received any loan terms from Countrywide other than those for which he qualified based on his credit standing.

== Role in the subprime mortgage crisis ==
Whether the GSEs (Government-Sponsored Enterprises) caused or greatly contributed to the 2008 financial crisis is controversial. The overwhelming consensus of those who have examined the issue find that their connection in to the crisis was minor at best. The Financial Crisis Inquiry Commission (FCIC) completed its analysis of the financial crisis and found that the GSE's "contributed to the crisis, but were not a primary cause". There was a strong dissent by one member of the commission. The FCIC found that the GSE's were late to the subprime lending game, entering the market in a substantial way in 2005. The GSE's followed rather than led the race to purchase subprime loan securities. The GSE's increased their involvement in the subprime securitization market because they were significantly losing market share and were feeling less relevant in the mortgage lending marketplace. In accordance with the mission of Fannie Mae to enable home ownership by a greater proportion of the population, Franklin Raines, while chairman and CEO, began a pilot program in 1999 to ease credit requirements on loans that Fannie Mae purchased from banks. Raines promoted the program saying that it would allow consumers who were "a notch below what our current underwriting has required" to get home loans. The move was intended in part to increase the number of minority and low income home owners.

The Investor's Business Daily editorial staff has noted that the expansion of easy credit to home buyers with a lesser ability to pay them back was one of the major contributing factors to the subprime mortgage crisis. Raines himself stated before Congress, "In 1994, we launched our trillion-dollar commitment, a pledge to provide $1 trillion in financing for 10 million underserved families before the decade was over ... In 2000 ... we launched a redoubled new pledge ... to provide $2 trillion for 18 million underserved families before this decade is over. ... we are one of the best capitalized financial institutions in the world, when compared to the risk of our business ... these assets are so riskless that their capital for holding them should be under 2 percent."

While the Fannie Mae pilot program described above sought to expand housing opportunities for under-served consumers, these loans did not result in major losses and performed significantly better than private label subprime loans. Phil Angelides, the chair of the FCIC commented that "the FCIC analyzed the performance of roughly 25 million mortgages outstanding at the end of each year from 2006 to 2009, and found that delinquency rates for the loans that Fannie Mae and Freddie Mac purchased or guaranteed were substantially lower than for mortgages securitized by other financial firms. This holds true even for loans to borrowers with similar credit scores or down payments. For example, data compiled by the FCIC for a subset of borrowers with scores below 660 shows that by the end of 2008, far fewer GSE mortgages were seriously delinquent than non-GSE securitized mortgages: 6.2 percent versus 28.3 percent." Although under Raines, Fannie Mae invested in some securities backed by subprime loans, it didn't start buying subprime and Alt-A loans directly (and bundling them into securities) until 2006 after Raines had left Fannie Mae. Purchasing of subprime and alt-A mortgages expanded under the guidance of Raines's successor Daniel H. Mudd. (See also Subprime lending.)

On December 9, 2008, Raines testified before the United States House Committee on Oversight and Government Reform on Capitol Hill regarding Fannie Mae, Freddie Mac, and financial market instability.

== Alleged connection to Obama ==
On July 16, 2008 The Washington Post reported that Franklin Raines had "taken calls from Barack Obama's presidential campaign seeking his advice on mortgage and housing policy matters". Also, in an editorial on August 27, 2008, titled "Tough Decision Coming", The Washington Post editorial staff wrote that "Two members of Mr. Obama's political circle, James A. Johnson and Franklin D. Raines, are former chief executives of Fannie Mae." On September 18, 2008, John McCain's campaign published a campaign ad that quoted The Washington Post reporting regarding Raines and Obama. The ad also notes that "Raines made millions and then left Fannie Mae while it was under investigation for accounting irregularities".

Neither Raines nor the Obama campaign had disputed the Post's reporting before the ad. The text in question consisted of one sentence in each article. After McCain's ad however, both denied that Raines was or had been a provider of advice to Obama or the Obama campaign.

In later commentary The Washington Post (the original source) described McCain's attempts to connect Obama with Raines based on their reporting as "a stretch" and said all reporting they did about the matter actually stems from a single conversation a reporter had with Raines in which she recalls Raines said he "had gotten a couple of calls from the Obama campaign". When the reporter queried Raines to the nature of the calls he said "oh, general housing, economy issues".

Additionally, an email hoax falsely claimed that Raines was made "chief economic advisor" for the Obama presidential campaign.

== See also ==
- Raines v. Byrd
- Raines' Rules

Political offices
Preceded by Alice Rivlin	Director of the Office of Management and Budget; 1996–1998	Succeeded by Jack Lew
