= Fremont General Corporation =

- Type: public company
- Industry: Financial services
- Predecessor: Tomar Financial Corp
- Founded: 1963
- Defunct: 2010
- Fate: bankruptcy
- Successor: Signature Group Holdings LLC
- Headquarters: Santa Monica, California, United States
- Area served: United States
- Key people: James A. McIntyre (CEO, 1976-2004)
- Services: Subprime mortgage lenders, investments, loans
- Website: fremontgeneral.com

Fremont General Corporation was an American holding company for Fremont Investment & Loan, an industrial bank based in Santa Monica, California.

At its peak, during the early and mid 2000s, it was one of the largest subprime mortgage lenders in the United States. The company filed for bankruptcy in 2008 during the 2008 financial crisis.

== History ==
=== Foundation and early years ===
The company was founded in 1963 and incorporated in 1972 under the name Lemac Corporation. It changed its name in March 1973 to Fremont General Corporation and served as a holding company. It went public in 1977. The company primarily owned insurance businesses during its early years, including property, casualty and life insurance. Their workers' compensation insurance business was the seventh largest in the United States.

The insurance operations gradually ceased, with the last, Fremont Indemnity, discontinued in 2001. The state of California took over supervision of the worker's compensation business in 2000, and the company agreed to cease its insurance operations, with the state assuming conservatorship in 2003.

The company was headed by James A. McIntyre, who served as the company's CEO from 1976 to 2004, and as chairman of the board from 1989 to January 2008.

=== Subprime lending business 1990s ===
In 1990, the company acquired Tomar Financial Corp, which owned two state-chartered industrial banks, Investors Thrift & Loan and Liberty Thrift & Loan. At the time, the two banks had combined assets of about $182 million (~$385 million in 2024). The two banks were merged and their name changed to Fremont Investment & Loan, based in Brea, California.

The bank's assets reached $12.7 billion at the end of 2006, with deposits of $10.1 billion. The bank was among the largest subprime mortgage lenders in the U.S., ranking sixth in 2005 and 2006 in the dollar volume of subprime mortgage originations. The bank was also among the largest issuers of subprime mortgage-backed securities in the U.S., ranking eighth in 2005 and fourth in 2006 in the dollar volume of subprime MBS issuances.

The company had a net loss of $202 million in 2006, and a net loss of $856 million in the first nine months of 2007. Fremont Investment & Loan was forced out of the subprime lending business in 2007 after their regulators, the Federal Deposit Insurance Corporation, filed a cease and desist notice against the bank.

The bank also sold their commercial lending business in May 2007 to iStar Financial.

The next year, the company relocated their headquarters from Santa Monica to Brea, California.

=== Bankruptcy 2008 ===
Fremont General Corp. filed for Chapter 11 bankruptcy in June 2008. Fremont Investment & Loan's assets were sold off and it surrendered its state banking charter. The bank's retail business, including its deposits, were sold in 2008 to CapitalSource Inc. in Chevy Chase, Maryland (which operated as CapitalSource Bank). The bank's mortgage servicing rights were sold to Litton Loan Servicing (owned at the time by Goldman Sachs, now owned by Ocwen).

The company emerged from bankruptcy in 2010 and was acquired by Signature Group Holdings LLC. Fremont General Corp.'s name was changed to Signature Group Holdings Inc. Its primary asset was almost $1 billion in net operating loss tax carryforwards. Investor Sam Zell acquired control of the company in 2013, and the name was changed to Real Industry, Inc. after its acquisition of Real Alloy, an aluminum recycling company.

=== Predatory practices and class action litigations ===
A consolidated securities class action was filed in the United States District Court for the Central District of California against Fremont in 2007. The suit alleged violations of federal securities laws concerning statements about its loan portfolio and financial condition. The action was dismissed with prejudice in April 2010. The plaintiffs filed an appeal.

In June 2009, the company agreed to a legal settlement with the State of Massachusetts regarding predatory lending practices. They agreed to pay $10 million in consumer relief, civil penalties and costs. The company had made adjustable-rate mortgage loans without considering the customers ability to pay after the initial teaser rate had expired.

A separate Employee Retirement Income Security Act of 1974 class action was filed in 2010 by participants in Fremont's retirement and employee stock plans. In 2011, the court approved a settlement under which insurance carriers agreed to pay $21 million to resolve the claims.
