= Institutional customers =

Financial services, pension funds and corporations, from the financial sector perspective

Institutional customers is a term used in the financial services industry to differentiate customers that are financial institutions or financial advisors, such as banks, insurance companies, and investment management companies, or high asset-customers, from retail and small business customers.

In some jurisdictions, institutional customers such as financial institutions may be able to enter transactions under a more lax regulatory environment than other categories of customer.
