= New Century Financial =

American real estate investment trust

New Century Financial Mortgage Corporation
- Genre: Mortgage Bank
- Fate: Bankrupt in 2007
- Headquarters: Irvine, California, United States
- Number of employees: 7,200 (2007)
- Website: ncen.com

New Century Financial Mortgage Corporation was a real estate investment trust that originated mortgage loans in the United States through its operating subsidiaries, New Century Mortgage Corporation and Home123 Corporation.

It was founded in 1995. In 2004 it converted to a real estate investment trust. In 2006, the company was second only to HSBC Finance in issuing subprime mortgages.

In the spring of 2007, New Century ran into financial difficulties, and trading of its stock on the NYSE was halted. On April 2, 2007, it filed for Chapter 11 bankruptcy. In July 2010, three officers of the company agreed to pay $90 million in settlements and were barred from serving as directors of public companies for five years.

== History ==
=== Founding of the company ===
It was founded in 1995 by a trio of former managers and cofounders at Option One Mortgage, including Brad Morrice, who became chief executive. It was headquartered in Irvine, California. It originally employed 50 people in 1996, when it began originating and purchasing loans. From 1997 until 2004, stock value rose 561 percent.

In 2004 it converted to a real estate investment trust and was listed on the New York Stock Exchange. In that year it originated $42.2 billion in mortgages and its stock reached a high of nearly $64 per share by the end of the year. In Fiscal year 2005 its net income was $417 million. The company had 35 regional operating centers as of late 2005, with headquarters remaining in Irvine, California. In 2005, 37 percent of its business was in California.

As of September 30, 2006, New Century reported that it had $25.1 billion in total assets, with total liabilities at $23 billion. At the end of the year, it reported $350 million in cash and liquidity. In 2006, the company was second only to HSBC Finance in issuing subprime mortgages, making $51.6 billion in subprime loans. Subprime mortgage loans are made to borrowers with limited or bad credit history. With a higher rate of default than prime loans, subprime mortgage loans are priced based on the risk assumed by the lender. In marketing the company, New Century's Home123 Mortgage division engaged Bob Vila as an advertising spokesman for several years. It also entered into a sponsorship deal with NASCAR, as the Official Mortgage Company of NASCAR and sponsor the Chip Ganassi Racing with Felix Sabates team, in both the Cup and Busch series.

By 2007, New Century had been the largest independent provider of subprime mortgages in the United States. On January 1, 2007, New Century had approximately 7,200 full-time employees and a market capitalization of $1.75 billion. As of January 1, 2007, it was headed by Brad Morrice as president and CEO. Frederic J. Forster, a lead independent director, served as chairman.

=== Financial difficulties ===
Loans began to slow in the second half of 2006.

In the spring of 2007, New Century went into a "death spiral". On March 8 it announced it would stop accepting loan applications. Four days later trading of its stock on the NYSE was halted.

On March 2, 2007, it announced it was the subject of two criminal probes by the federal government, and that its auditor KPMG had worries about the company's ability to stay solvent. Over the subsequent week, the company lost 78% of its stock value.

In early March, it reported that it had failed to meet certain financial requirements of its lenders.

While New Century's problems became public news in February & March 2007, primarily as a result of the pullback of more than half of its 11 warehouse lenders, (who funded New Century's loan closings until they could be securitized), mortgage insiders heard rumors of New Century's loss of some of its (wholesale/warehouse) lines of credit as early as the end of the third quarter, 2006.

On March 8, 2007, New Century Financial Corporation announced that it was stopping new loans while it sought new funding. Early on March 12, it said that its financing had been cut off from most creditors, or that most planned to do so, and warned that many of its loan obligations were in default.

New Century Financial Corporation also said that one of its financial backers had demanded that the company repurchase some loans pursuant to repurchase provisions contained in loan purchase agreements.

In a filing on March 12, 2007, it said that its lenders could demand $8.4 billion in loan repayments which it couldn't fulfill. It was announced that the $8.4 billion in obligations which could come due immediately, with the company considered close to bankruptcy, as it did not have the cash to do so.

On March 12, 2007, the New York Stock Exchange halted trading of the New Century Financial Corporation, delisting the company. Beforehand, the company's shares had plunged 89% that month. But on March 13, 2007, the NYSE delisted the corporation and by the next day its market capitalization was less than $55 million. New Century was now trading on the over the counter pink sheets, where its stock traded at $0.10 per share in 2007.

On March 13, 2007, New Century Financial Corporation reported in a regulatory filing that it has received a grand jury subpoena from the U.S. Attorney's Office for the Central District of California as well as a letter from the Securities and Exchange Commission notifying the company of a preliminary investigation. The filing stated that the U.S. Attorney's office indicated in a letter dated February 28, 2007 that it was conducting a criminal inquiry in connection with trading in the company's securities as well as accounting errors regarding the company's allowance for repurchase losses. The filing further stated that the Securities and Exchange Commission has requested a meeting with the company to discuss the company's previous announcement that it would restate certain financial statement.

On March 14, 2007, it was reported that Barclays had demanded that New Century immediately pay back $900 million of mortgage loans. Just days before, New Century had said it had less than $60 million of cash on hand.

New Century Financial Corporation and Home123 Corporation received a cease and desist notice on March 14, 2007, from Connecticut Banking Commissioner Howard F. Pitkin, for failing to meet agreements. That day it was also blocked from making loans in New Hampshire, on the grounds that it hadn't informed the state of its financial difficulties. New Jersey did the same that day. New Century said it intended to comply with the orders, pending any appeals. The company received cease and desist orders from the states of Connecticut, Maryland, Rhode Island and Tennessee on March 14 and 15, and by March 19, it was under such orders in eight states total, including Pennsylvania. California followed on March 16.

On March 20, 2007, New Century Financial Corporation said that it could no longer sell mortgage loans to Fannie Mae or act as the primary servicer of mortgage loans for the government sponsored enterprise. In a filing with the Securities and Exchange Commission, New Century Financial Corporation said that Fannie Mae terminated "for cause" a mortgage selling and servicing contract with it citing alleged breaches of that contract and others.

=== Bankruptcy ===
On April 2, 2007, it filed for Chapter 11 bankruptcy. New Century Financial Corporation and its related entities filed voluntary petitions for relief under Chapter 11 of the United States Bankruptcy Code in the United States Bankruptcy Court, District of Delaware located in Wilmington, Delaware. New Century Financial Corporation listed liabilities of more than $100 million. New Century Financial Corporation also announced that the employment of about 3,200 people, more than half the workforce, would be terminated.

At the time it filed for bankruptcy, it had already fired 3,200 employees, or 54% of its work force, with plans to quickly sell assets in the upcoming month and a half. The company secured $150 million of financing from CIT Group Inc. and Greenwich Capital so that it could continue to operate during the bankruptcy process. It was reported it had about 100,000 creditors.

On May 25, 2007, they filed their 8-K form, a day after stating that they "...probably overstated 2005 earnings."

On June 8, 2007, New Century Financial warned that its effort to liquidate assets could be stymied if GE Capital was allowed to proceed with plans to seize computers and other equipment it leased to the bankrupt housing lender. GE Capital, arguing that New Century owes it $8.7 million on leased equipment and can't stay current on payments, asked a judge to lift the protection normally granted to companies in Chapter 11. That would enable the firm, a unit of General Electric, to repossess the equipment, which includes computer servers, and chairs. New Century said that would disrupt its effort to wind down operations and repay creditors. New Century said "much of the data and information" involving its assets and business operations, including accounting information, is stored on the computers, or generated by them. New Century also said "it is critical for the debtors to use the equipment" so that the loan-servicing business it recently sold to Carrington Capital Management can be kept "operating as a going concern." Carrington paid $188 million for the business.

In March 2008, during the liquidation of New Century Financial Corporation, a private company in Northern Illinois acquired only the brand assets in the bankruptcy. New Century Financial held several brands including Home123. The brand Home123 was reintroduced to the market as a real estate marketing and technology firm focused on bringing people, resources, and information together.

The New Century brand as of 2008 was being positioned for sale.

=== Lawsuits and settlements ===
On March 26, 2008, an unsealed report by bankruptcy court examiner Michael J. Missal outlined a number of "significant improper and imprudent practices related to its loan originations, operations, accounting and financial reporting processes," and accused auditor KPMG with helping the company conceal the problems during 2005 and 2006.

On December 7, 2009, federal regulators sued three former officers of New Century Financial Corp. (Brad Morrice, Patti M. Dodge and David N. Kenneally), accusing them of misleading the company's investors about the company's prospects, as pervasive bad acts in the mortgage industry began to become widely known.

In July 2010, three officers of the company agreed to pay $90 million in settlements and were barred from serving as directors of public companies for five years.

On July 31, 2010, the Los Angeles Times reported that settlements had been reached between the SEC, plaintiffs representing a class of investors, and directors and officers of New Century. The SEC settlement, which involved an action brought by the SEC against three officers of New Century (Brad Morrice, Patti M. Dodge and David N. Kenneally), barred them from serving as directors of public companies for five years, and levied fines and profit-disgorgement on them. None of the defendants admitted any wrongdoing. The directors of New Century were not sued or barred by the SEC. On the same day the SEC settlement was announced, New Century, and its directors and officers settled civil class actions claims brought against them and the company. The same three officers listed above were parties to that civil settlement, as were the following former directors of New Century: co-founder Robert K. Cole, the estate of co-founder Edward Gotschall, Fredrick J. Forster, Michael M. Sachs, Harold A. Black, Donald E. Lange, Terrence P. Sandvik, Richard A. Zona, Marilyn A. Alexander, David Einhorn and William J. Popejoy.

== In popular culture ==
In The Big Short (2015), young investors Charlie Geller and Jamie Shipley have bet heavily on the failure of sub-prime mortgage bonds, but have to endure an excruciating wait while the spike in defaults seems to leave the housing market unaffected. But on 2 April 2007, they learn of New Century's bankruptcy while watching CNN, and realize the collapse of the market has begun in earnest.

== See also ==
- United States housing bubble
- 2007 subprime mortgage financial crisis
- Countrywide Financial
