= Angelo Mozilo =

American banker (1938–2023)

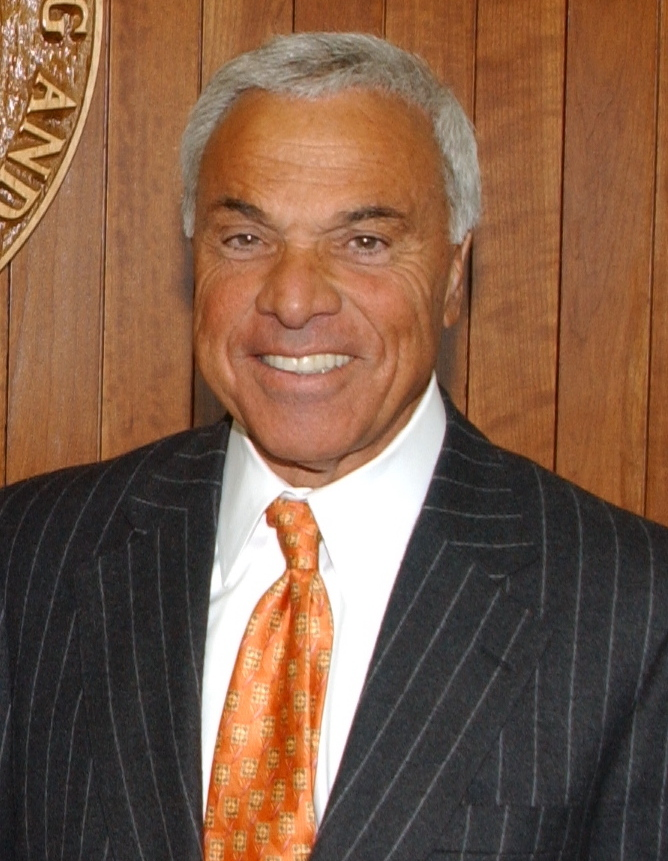
- Mozilo in 2002
- Born: Angelo Robert Mozilo; December 16, 1938; New York City, U.S.
- Died: July 16, 2023 (aged 84); Montecito, California, U.S.
- Education: Fordham University; Mount Saint Michael Academy
- Occupation: Business executive
- Employer: Countrywide Financial
- Spouse: Phyllis Ardese (m. 1961; died 2017)
- Children: 5

Angelo Robert Mozilo (December 16, 1938 – July 16, 2023) was an American mortgage industry banker who was co-founder, chairman of the board, and chief executive officer of mortgage giant Countrywide Financial until July 1, 2008. Mozilo retired shortly after the sale to Bank of America for a total of $4.1 billion in stock. The company's status as a major lender of subprime mortgages made it a central player in a subsequent mortgage crisis which collapsed the industry, bursting a housing bubble which had accumulated throughout the 2000s, and contributing heavily to the Great Recession. Mozilo later paid over $67 million in fines to settle a series of federal charges related to his conduct at the company.

== Early life and education ==
Angelo Robert Mozilo was born in the Bronx on December 16, 1938. His grandparents were Italian immigrants and his father was a butcher. He attended Catholic schools as a child, and helped his father with his business from age 12. When he was 14, he began working as a messenger for a mortgage broker. He was a graduate of Fordham University.

== Career ==
In 1969, he and his former mentor David S. Loeb, who had already started a mortgage lending company, founded Countrywide Credit Industries in New York. They later moved the headquarters to Pasadena, California, and then to Calabasas, California, in Los Angeles County. Mozilo and Loeb cofounded IndyMac Bank, which was originally known as Countrywide Mortgage Investment, before being spun off as an independent bank in 1997. IndyMac collapsed and was seized by federal regulators on July 11, 2008. Mozilo did not hold any managerial, executive, or chair positions at any time leading up to this event.

After Countrywide was listed on the NYSE in 1984, Mozilo sold $406 million (~$1.03 billion in 2024) worth of its stock, mostly obtained through stock option grants. $129 million (~$187 million in 2024) of this was realized in the 12 months ending August 2007.

In the beginning, Countrywide was a pioneer in the nationwide non-bank mortgage industry, and grew to become one of the biggest mortgage lending companies in the United States. Mozilo was very concerned with the quality of credit borrowers and the quality of their loans. When subprime loans came onto the scene in the late 1980s (Guardian S&L) and 1990s (The Money Store), his company did not participate. He privately described the subprime loan mavericks of the 1990s as "crooks". However, his company began to lose business to the subprime lenders. He had to compete with them or keep losing market share. Thus, by the early 2000s, Countrywide began using subprime loans.

Perhaps more than any single individual, Mozilo has come to symbolize, and bear the blame for, the subprime mortgage crisis. In a New York Times feature on October 20, 2008, Henry G. Cisneros, former secretary of HUD and member of the Countrywide board of directors, described Mozilo as "sick with stress—the final chapter of his life is the infamy that's been brought on him, or that he brought on himself." CNN named Mozilo as one of the 'Ten Most Wanted: Culprits' of the 2008 financial collapse in the United States, a theory further supported in Inside Job, an Academy Award-winning documentary on the 2008 financial crisis. For years afterward, Mozilo denied that the subprime mortgage industry bore any responsibility for the crisis, instead attributing it to a credit crunch.

=== Compensation ===
Mozilo's compensation during the United States housing bubble of 2001–06 later came under scrutiny. During that period, his total compensation (including salary, bonuses, options and restricted stock) approached $470 million. His compensation also included payment for equity memberships and annual country club dues at Sherwood Country Club in Thousand Oaks, CA, The Quarry at La Quinta golf club in La Quinta, California, and at the Robert Trent Jones Golf Club in Gainesville, Virginia. Mozilo testified before the United States House Committee on Oversight and Government Reform on March 7, 2008, calling reports of his pay "grossly exaggerated" in some instances and pointing out that he lost millions as well. He defended the pay: The compensation was a function of how the company did ahead of the mortgage crisis.

== SEC accusation regarding insider sales ==
Over many years, Mozilo sold hundreds of millions of dollars in stock, even while publicly touting the stock and using shareholder funds to buy back stock to support the share price. On June 4, 2009, the U.S. Securities and Exchange Commission charged him with insider trading and securities fraud.

=== Settlement with SEC ===
On October 15, 2010, Mozilo reached a settlement with the Securities and Exchange Commission over securities fraud and insider trading charges. Mozilo agreed to pay $67.5 million in fines, and accepted a lifetime ban from serving as an officer or director of any public company. It is the largest settlement by an individual or executive connected to the 2008 housing collapse. Robert Khuzami, director of the SEC's Division of Enforcement, said in a statement that "Mozilo's record penalty is the fitting outcome for a corporate executive who deliberately disregarded his duties to investors by concealing what he saw from inside the executive suite." By settling the SEC charges, Mozilo avoided a trial that could have led to future criminal charges.

The terms of the settlement allowed Mozilo to avoid acknowledgment of wrongdoing. Countrywide was to pay $20 million of the $67.5 million penalty because of an indemnification agreement that was part of Mozilo's employment contract.

In February 2011, the US dropped its criminal investigation into the facts behind the civil settlement.

== Friends of Angelo (FOA) VIP program ==
In June 2008, Conde Nast Portfolio reported that several influential lawmakers and politicians, including Senate Banking Committee Chairman Christopher Dodd, Senate Budget Committee Chairman Kent Conrad, and former Fannie Mae CEO Jim Johnson, received favorable mortgage financing from Countrywide by virtue of being "Friends of Angelo".

Democratic Senator Dodd received a $75,000 reduction in mortgage payments from Countrywide at allegedly below-market rates on his Washington, D.C., and Connecticut homes. Dodd nonetheless called for stronger regulation of mortgage lenders and proposed that predatory lenders should face criminal charges.

Clinton Jones III, senior counsel of the House Financial Services Subcommittee on Housing and Community Opportunity, and "an adviser to ranking Republican members of Congress responsible for legislation of interest to the financial services industry and of importance to Countrywide." was given special treatment. Jones is now state director for federal residential-mortgage bundler Freddie Mac. Alphonso Jackson, acting secretary of HUD at the time and long-time friend and Texas neighbor of President Bush, received a discounted mortgage for himself and sought one for his daughter. "In 2003, using V.I.P. loans for nearly $1 million apiece, Franklin Raines, Fannie Mae’s chairman and C.E.O. from 1999 to 2004, twice refinanced his seven-bedroom home, which has a pool and movie theater."

Though Mozilo donated extensively to both parties during the Clinton Administration, he himself was reportedly a registered Republican. Speaker of the House Nancy Pelosi's son Paul Pelosi Jr. also received a loan with Countrywide. Barbara Boxer, Adam H. Putnam, Richard C. Holbrooke, James E. Clyburn, and Donna Shalala are among those with mortgages from Countrywide. CBS News obtained a list of then-Fannie Mae employees whose names have been turned over to investigators as having received VIP loans from Countrywide.

== Personal life and death ==
Mozilo married Phyllis Ardese in 1961. They had five children and were together until her death in 2017.

Mozilo was a resident of Montecito, California, where he died on July 16, 2023, at age 84, of natural causes.

== In media ==
In the documentary film Inside Job, Mozilo is cited as one of the persons responsible for the economic meltdown of 2008 and named in Time magazine as one of the "25 People to Blame for the Financial Crisis". Condé Nast Portfolio ranked Mozilo second-worst on their list of "Worst American CEOs of All Time". (Note: Mozilo was ranked second-worst, one spot worse than Kenneth Lay at third-worst, and just ahead of Dick Fuld at worst overall.)

In the 2011 four-part investigative series Meltdown, Al Jazeera named Mozilo as one of the people responsible for the trend of making subprime loans to borrowers with poor credit history.

== Accolades ==
- Horatio Alger Association of Distinguished Americans Award
- Ellis Island Medal of Honor
- Albert Schweitzer Award
- National Italian American Foundation Special Achievement Award for Humanitarian Service
- National Association of Home Builders Hall of Fame
- American Banker Lifetime Achievement Award

== See also ==
- Subprime mortgage crisis
- Countrywide financial political loan scandal
