= IndyMac =

Defunct bank in the United States

IndyMac Bank
- Type: Savings bank/federally-owned bridge bank
- Industry: Banking
- Founded: July 16, 1985 (as Countrywide Mortgage Investment); July 1, 1997 (as independent entity)
- Founder: David S. Loeb; Angelo Mozilo
- Defunct: July 11, 2008
- Fate: Chapter 7 bankruptcy and seized by the Federal Deposit Insurance Corporation
- Successors: OneWest Bank
- Headquarters: Pasadena, California, United States
- Products: Alt-A mortgages and reverse mortgages
- Total assets: $32.01 billion (at time of seizure by FDIC)
- Subsidiaries: IndyMac Federal Bank; Financial Freedom; New York Mortgage Company; Barrington Capital Corporation

IndyMac, a contraction of Independent National Mortgage Corporation, was an American bank based in California that failed in 2008 and was seized by the United States Federal Deposit Insurance Corporation (FDIC).

Before its failure, IndyMac Bank was the largest savings and loan association in the Los Angeles area and the seventh largest mortgage originator in the United States. The failure of IndyMac Bank on July 11, 2008, was the fourth largest bank failure in United States, and the second largest failure of a regulated thrift at that time. "Mac" is an established contraction for "Mortgage Corporation", usually associated with government sponsored entities such as "Freddie Mac" (Federal Home Loan Mortgage Corporation) and "Farmer Mac" (Federal Agricultural Mortgage Corporation). Indymac, however, had always been a private corporation with no relationship to the government.

It was heavily involved in Alt-A mortgages and reverse mortgages which in part resulted in its dramatic rise and has been suggested as the cause for its demise, as a large number of these questionable loans failed during the U.S. subprime mortgage crisis of 2007–2009.

The FDIC put the assets up for auction and the bulk of the business was sold to IMB HoldCo LLC who turned this into OneWest Bank. The FDIC kept some of the assets and liabilities that it could not sell in a holding entity known as IndyMac Federal Bank, which would be slowly wound down.

== History ==
IndyMac Bank was founded as Countrywide Mortgage Investment in 1985 by David S. Loeb and Angelo Mozilo as a means of collateralizing Countrywide Financial loans too big to be sold to Freddie Mac and Fannie Mae. In 1997, Countrywide spun off IndyMac as an independent company run by Mike Perry, who remained its CEO until the downfall of the bank in July 2008.

=== Growth and acquisitions ===
In July 2000, IndyMac Mortgage Holdings, Inc. acquired SGV Bancorp, the parent of First Federal Savings and Loan Association of San Gabriel Valley. IndyMac changed its name to IndyMac Bank and became the ninth largest bank headquartered in California. IndyMac Bank, operating as a combined thrift and mortgage bank, provided lending for the purchase, development, and improvement of single-family housing. IndyMac Bank also issued secondary mortgages secured by such housing, and other forms of consumer credit.

IndyMac Bancorp, a holding company headquartered in Pasadena, California, eventually acquired:

- Financial Freedom, an originator and servicer of reverse mortgage loans, on July 16, 2004;
- New York Mortgage Company, an East Coast mortgage bank, on April 2, 2007;
- Barrington Capital Corporation, a West Coast mortgage bank, in September 2007.

=== Decline ===
The primary causes of IndyMac's failure were largely associated with its business strategy of originating and securitizing Alt-A loans on a large scale. This strategy resulted in rapid growth and a high concentration of risky assets. From its inception as a savings association in 2000, IndyMac grew to the seventh largest savings and loan and ninth largest originator of mortgage loans in the United States. During 2006, IndyMac originated over $90 billion of mortgages.

IndyMac's aggressive growth strategy, use of Alt-A and other nontraditional loan products, insufficient underwriting, credit concentrations in residential real estate in the California and Florida markets, and heavy reliance on costly funds borrowed from the Federal Home Loan Bank (FHLB) and from brokered deposits, led to its demise when the mortgage market declined in 2007.

IndyMac often made loans without verification of the borrower's income or assets, and to borrowers with poor credit histories. Appraisals obtained by IndyMac on underlying collateral were often questionable as well. As an Alt-A lender, IndyMac's business model was to offer loan products to fit the borrower's needs, using an extensive array of risky option-adjustable-rate-mortgages (option ARMs), subprime loans, 80/20 loans, and other nontraditional products. Ultimately, loans were made to many borrowers who simply could not afford to make their payments. The thrift remained profitable only as long as it was able to sell those loans in the secondary mortgage market. IndyMac resisted efforts to regulate its involvement in those loans or tighten their issuing criteria: see the comment by Ruthann Melbourne, Chief Risk Officer, to the regulating agencies.

=== Turning point ===
May 12, 2008, in a small note in the "Capital" section of what would become its last 10-Q released before receivership, IndyMac revealed—but did not admit—that it was no longer a well-capitalized institution and that it was headed for insolvency.

IndyMac reported that during April 2008, Moody's and Standard & Poor's downgraded the ratings on a significant number of Mortgage-backed security (MBS) bonds including $160 million of those issued by Indymac and which the bank retained in its MBS portfolio. Indymac concluded that these downgrades would have negatively impacted the Company's risk-based capital ratio as of June 30, 2008. Had these lowered ratings been in effect at March 31, 2008, Indymac concluded that the bank's capital ratio would have been 9.27% total risk-based. Indymac warned that if its regulators found its capital position to have fallen below “well capitalized” (minimum 10% risk-based capital ratio) to “adequately capitalized” (8-10% risk-based capital ratio) the bank might no longer be able to use brokered deposits as a source of funds. Indymac further warned that if its level of deposit liquidity was reduced in this way, the bank anticipated that it would reduce its assets and, most likely, curtail its lending activities. This statement was comparable to those adopted by other Southern California banks that were experiencing liquidity problems, such as Pomona First Federal (PFF) and Vineyard Bank.

Senator Charles Schumer (D-NY) would later point out that brokered deposits made up more than 37 percent of Indymac's total deposits and ask the Federal Deposit Insurance Corporation (FDIC) whether it had considered ordering IndyMac to reduce its reliance on these deposits. With $18.9 billion in total deposits reported on March 31, Senator Schumer would have been referring to a little over $7 billion in brokered deposits. While the breakout of maturities of these deposits is not known exactly, a simple averaging would have put the threat of brokered deposits loss to IndyMac at $500 million a month, had the regulator disallowed IndyMac from acquiring new brokered deposits on June 30.

IndyMac had suffered its third-consecutive quarterly loss. The bank reported that nonperforming loans totaled $1.85 billion as of March 31, increasing 40.56% from just the previous quarter. In the 10-Q filing, the company stated it expected "to have an even higher level of non-performing loans in the future due to the continued market disruption".

IndyMac was taking new measures to preserve capital, such as deferring interest payments on some preferred securities. Dividends on common shares had already been suspended for the first quarter of 2008, after being cut in half the previous quarter. The company still had not secured a significant capital infusion nor found a ready buyer.

According to IndyMac's 10-Q, the bank's risk-based capital ratio had dropped to 10.26% as of March 31, from 10.81% the previous quarter. This ratio, which factors in asset quality and loan-loss reserve coverage, needs to be at least 10% for an institution to be considered well-capitalized under regulatory guidelines. IndyMac reported that the bank's risk-based capital was only $47 million above the minimum required for this 10% mark. But it did not reveal some of that $47 million it claimed it had as of March 31, 2008 was actually a fiction.

=== Collapse ===
When home prices declined in the latter half of 2007 and the secondary mortgage market collapsed, IndyMac was forced to hold $10.7 billion of loans it could not sell in the secondary market. Its reduced liquidity was further exacerbated in late June 2008 when account holders withdrew $1.55 billion or about 7.5% of IndyMac's deposits. This “run” on the thrift followed the public release of a letter from Senator Charles Schumer to the FDIC and OTS. The letter outlined the Senator's concerns with IndyMac. While the run was a contributing factor in the timing of IndyMac's demise, the underlying cause of the failure was the unsafe and unsound manner in which the thrift was operated.

On June 26, 2008, Senator Charles Schumer (D-NY), a member of the Senate Banking Committee, chairman of Congress' Joint Economic Committee and the third-ranking Democrat in the Senate, released several letters he had sent to regulators, which warned that “the possible collapse of big mortgage lender IndyMac Bancorp Inc. poses significant financial risks to its borrowers and depositors, and regulators may not be ready to intervene to protect them”. Some worried depositors began to withdraw money.

On July 7, 2008, IndyMac announced on the company blog that it had failed to raise capital since its May 12 quarterly earnings report and had been notified by bank and thrift regulators that IndyMac Bank was no longer deemed “well-capitalized”.

On the same day, IndyMac also announced the closure of both its retail lending and wholesale divisions, halted new loan submissions, and cut 3,800 jobs.

On July 8, 2008, IndyMac announced the sale of its Retail Lending Group to Prospect Mortgage Company, LLC. That day, the bank's shares closed at $0.44 in trading on the New York Stock Exchange, a loss of over 99% from its high of $50 in 2006. Additionally, analyst Paul J. Miller Jr. cut his price target on IndyMac to $0 from $1, rating the company's share price “Underperform”. On July 9, Standard & Poor's cut IndyMac's counterparty credit risk rating to “CCC”, just a few steps above default, from “B”, the fifth highest junk level, and said it may cut them again. The following day, the bank's shares reached a 52-week closing low of $0.31.

On July 11, 2008, citing liquidity concerns, the FDIC put IndyMac Bank into conservatorship. A bridge bank, IndyMac Federal Bank, FSB, was established to assume control of IndyMac Bank's assets, its secured liabilities, and its insured deposit accounts. The FDIC announced plans to open IndyMac Federal Bank, FSB on Monday July 14, 2008. Until then, depositors would have to access their insured deposits through ATMs, their existing checks, and their existing debit cards. Telephone and Internet account access would also be restored on Monday, when the bank reopened. The FDIC guarantees the funds of all insured accounts up to US$100,000, and has declared a special advance dividend to the roughly 10,000 depositors with funds in excess of the insured amount, guaranteeing 50% of any amounts in excess of $100,000. Yet, even with the pending sale of Indymac to IMB Management Holdings, an estimated 10,000 uninsured depositors of Indymac are still at a loss of over $270 million. In response, Congress increased the FDIC insurance limit to $250,000 for any bank that failed since January 1, 2008, as part of the Dodd-Frank Act, including retroactive payments to depositors for any amount up to the new limit not already covered by dividend distributions or the old $100,000 limit.

With $32 billion in assets, IndyMac Bank is one of the largest bank failures in American history, after the 1984 failure of Continental Illinois National Bank, with $40 billion of assets, and the 1988 failure of American Savings and Loan Association of Stockton, California. due to large losses in mortgage-backed securities.

IndyMac Bancorp filed for Chapter 7 bankruptcy on July 31, 2008.

=== US Senator accused of causing run ===
IndyMac's dire condition and the failure of regulators resulted in something of a bank run after Senator Charles Schumer warned the public of them. IndyMac depositors, fearing the worst, withdrew about 7.5% of deposits from IndyMac. Shifting focus from the financial condition of the bank to Senator Schumer, regulators and others in the financial sector quickly criticized Schumer for publicly releasing his letters, which they attempted to discredit and claimed further destabilized the bank.

Leading the criticism was John M. Reich, director of the OTS, who said that the Federal Deposit Insurance Corporation (FDIC) and Office of Thrift Supervision (OTS) “do not comment on open and operating institutions”. Mr. Reich spoke widely of “dissemination of incomplete or erroneous information” and “rumors and innuendo” and the “strict policy of privacy” at OTS and FDIC.

Mr. Reich would later be forced to remove OTS western regional director Darrel W. Dochow, for improperly allowing 5 banks to make backdated capital adjustments. On February 12, 2009, Reich would resign and step down February 27, 2009, amidst a Treasury Department investigation and audit of OTS failures and misconduct. On March 26, 2009, Scott Polakoff—former OTS senior deputy director and chief operating officer, hired by Reich, who became acting director upon Reich's departure—was removed and placed on leave, pending an expanded Treasury Department investigation and audit. A February 26, 2009 report by the Office of Inspector General for the Treasury Department would later conclude that IndyMac was already a doomed institution and that Prompt Corrective Action should have been taken in May 2008. The IG dismissed the idea that Mr. Schumer's letters led to the downfall of the bank.

=== Backdating scandal ===
IndyMac backdated an $18 million contribution from its parent company in order to preserve the bank's appearance as a “well-capitalized” institution. Mr. Dochow allowed IndyMac Bank to receive $18 million from its parent company and book the money as if it had arrived by the end of the March 31 quarter when, in fact, it had arrived on May 9, only three days before IndyMac filed the 10-Q for that March 31 quarter. Had Mr. Dochow not allowed this irregular, retroactive contribution to capital, Indymac would have been forced to report that its capital had already slipped below the minimum level that regulators require for classifying banks as well capitalized, thus putting $6.8 billion in brokered deposits—or 37 percent of Indymac's total deposits—at risk, as noted in the previous section. It also would have prevented IndyMac from luring new customers by offering deposit rates which exceeded the limitations prescribed in FDIC regulations. In the final two months before IndyMac was placed into receivership, it was allowed to bring in at least $90 million in new uninsured deposits.

The irregularity allowed by Mr. Dochow let IndyMac hide from publicity the fact that the threat to IndyMac's brokered deposits was not just a possible outcome but was a situation which had already begun—months before the disclosure of Senator Schumer's concerns about OTS and IndyMac. Investigators reported that similar officially approved backdating occurred at four other institutions.

Mr. Dochow played a central role in the Savings and Loan crisis of the 1980s, overriding a recommendation by federal bank examiners in San Francisco to seize Lincoln Savings, the giant savings and loan owned by Charles Keating. Lincoln became one of the biggest institutions to collapse. Mr. Keating served four and a half years in prison before his fraud and racketeering convictions were overturned. He later pleaded guilty to more limited charges, and was sentenced to the time already served.

William K. Black, a senior bank regulator during the savings and loan crisis and the author of The Best Way to Rob a Bank is to Own One, said Mr. Dochow's lenience highlighted the longstanding unwillingness of the Office of Thrift Supervision to take charge.

“The O.T.S. did nothing effective to regulate any of the specialized large nonprime lenders,” Mr. Black said. “So what you got was what the F.B.I. accurately described as early as 2004 as an epidemic of mortgage fraud”.

=== Treasury Department Inspector General's investigation ===
On February 26, 2009, the Treasury Department's inspector general concluded that federal regulators failed to catch warning signs that presaged the IndyMac Bank's collapse. The U.S. government watchdog said the Pasadena, Calif., savings and loan pursued an overly aggressive growth strategy that included failing to verify borrowers' income and relying on expensive deposits to fund its operations. The Office of Thrift Supervision, IndyMac's regulator, recognized the red flags but did nothing to stop them, the Treasury inspector general said.

“We found that OTS identified numerous problems and risks, including the quantity and poor quality of nontraditional mortgage products,” the report said. Yet the “OTS did not take aggressive action to stop those practices from continuing to proliferate,” according to the report.

The report also rejected much of the blame targeted at Sen. Charles Schumer (D., N.Y.) Mr. Schumer came under fire in June 2008 for making public a letter he sent to regulators questioning IndyMac's ability to stay afloat as a business.

The Treasury inspector general found that the letter was a “contributing factor” in the timing of IndyMac's collapse, but that “the underlying cause of the failure was the unsafe and unsound manner in which the thrift was operated”.

“Also, the thrift was already on a course for probable failure by the time Mr. Schumer's letter was made public,” the report said.

On March 27, 2009, A spokesman said the U.S. Treasury Inspector General is reviewing actions by the Office of Thrift Supervision on backdating banks’ capital injections after the regulator's acting director was removed and placed on leave. Inspector General Eric Thorson gave findings “regarding certain actions by management” at OTS to Treasury Secretary Timothy Geithner, replaced Acting Director Scott Polakoff pending an investigation, according to separate statements. John Bowman, the deputy director and chief counsel, was named the agency's acting director, OTS said. The OTS permitted five banks, including failed lender IndyMac Bancorp Inc., to revise capital reports for the first quarter to show higher levels after the period ended. The action allowed lenders, such as IndyMac, to avoid further regulatory restriction.

=== Other investigations ===
On June 30, 2008, the Center for Responsible Lending, a Washington think tank, released a report compiling information from various lawsuits filed by customers and former employees of IndyMac Bank, and alleged that managers and supervisors were being pressured to approve loans or risk being fired. Before its collapse, IndyMac denied the allegations in the report.

On July 16, 2008, an unnamed US government official said that the FBI was investigating IndyMac for possible fraud. While it is not clear if the investigation began before the bank was taken over by the FDIC, the investigation appears to have been focused on the company itself, and not individuals within the company.

== See also ==
- 2008 United States bank failures
- Subprime mortgage crisis
