= David S. Loeb =

American businessman and banker

- Born: January 19, 1924
- Died: June 30, 2003 (aged 79); Sparks, Nevada, U.S.
- Education: Maine Maritime Academy; New York University
- Occupations: Businessman; banker
- Spouse: Ingrid Heidi Loeb
- Children: 3 biological, 1 stepchild

David S. Loeb (January 19, 1924 – June 30, 2003) was the co-founder of both Countrywide Financial Corp and IndyMac Bank along with former protégé and longtime business partner Angelo Mozilo. Loeb served as president and chairman of Countrywide from 1969 to 2000 and Chairman of IndyMac from its 1985 inception until his retirement in 2003.

Loeb graduated in 1943 from the Maine Maritime Academy with a bachelor's degree in nautical science and later served on the academy's board of trustees. He was a benefactor of the academy's Loeb-Sullivan School of International Business and Logistics. Maine Maritime awarded him an honorary doctorate in 2002. Loeb served as a navigator in the Merchant Marine during World War II. He received a bachelor's degree in accounting from New York University in 1951 and served on the board of overseers of the NYU/Stern School of Business, where he endowed a professorship in finance.

David Loeb was also active in real estate development. His Wingfield Nevada Group/Loeb Enterprises, LLC developed planned communities including a 1,350-acre (5.5 km^{2}) development in Sparks, Nevada, called Wingfield Springs.

Loeb died on June 30, 2003, at the age of 79 in his home at the Wingfield Springs community of Sparks, Nevada. He is survived by his wife Ingrid Heidi Loeb; three daughters, Tracey Loeb, Heidi Loeb and Wendy Lumsden; and a stepson, Nicholas Casini.
