= James A. Johnson (businessman) =

American businessman and political figure (1943–2020)

Jim Johnson
- Born: December 24, 1943; Benson, Minnesota, U.S.
- Died: October 18, 2020 (aged 76); Washington, D.C., U.S.
- Education: University of Minnesota, Twin; Cities (BA); Princeton University (MPA)
- Political party: Democratic
- Website: Official website

James A. Johnson (December 24, 1943 – October 18, 2020) was an American businessman, Democratic Party political figure, and chairman and chief executive officer of Fannie Mae. He was the campaign chairman for Walter Mondale's unsuccessful 1984 presidential bid and chaired the vice presidential selection committee for the presidential campaign of John Kerry. He briefly led the vice-presidential selection process for the 2008 Democratic presidential nominee, Senator Barack Obama.

Before working for Fannie Mae, Johnson co-founded the private consulting firm Public Strategies with diplomat Richard Holbrooke. They sold the company to Shearson Lehman Brothers in 1985, after which Johnson served as a managing director at Lehman Brothers. After leading Fannie Mae from 1991 to 1998, Johnson became a board member of the investment bank Goldman Sachs as well as several other companies including Target Corporation and UnitedHealth Group. He was also chairman of both the Kennedy Center for the Arts and the Brookings Institution.

== Early life and education ==
Johnson was born on December 24, 1943, in Benson, Minnesota. He was the son of Adeline, a schoolteacher, and Alfred I. Johnson, who was a member of the Minnesota House of Representatives from 1941 to 1958, and served as speaker of the house in 1955 and 1957.

At the University of Minnesota, Johnson was student body president and graduated with a B.A. in political science in 1966, and a Master of Public Affairs degree from the School of Public and International Affairs at Princeton University in 1968.

== Career ==
While a student at the University of Minnesota, Johnson began his political career as a volunteer on the 1968 presidential campaign of Eugene McCarthy. He was later a faculty member at Princeton University.

In the 1972 Democratic Party presidential primaries, Johnson started as the national campaign coordinator for Senator Edmund Muskie, whose primary campaign came to an end despite early victories in Iowa and Illinois. From 1973 to 1976, Johnson served as director of public affairs at the Dayton-Hudson Corporation (now Target Corporation). During this period, Johnson also worked for Senators George McGovern and Walter Mondale. In 1974, Mondale considered a run in the 1976 presidential primaries with an exploratory committee which Johnson helped create. In 1976, he was deputy director of Mondale's vice-presidential campaign and was executive assistant to the Vice President during the entire Carter Administration.

In 1981, Johnson co-founded Public Strategies, a private consulting firm, with diplomat Richard Holbrooke. During that time, he was the campaign manager for Walter Mondale's unsuccessful 1984 presidential bid. After selling Public Strategies to Shearson Lehman Brothers in 1985, Johnson was a managing director at Lehman Brothers from 1985 to 1990.

In 1990, Johnson became vice chairman of Fannie Mae, or the Federal National Mortgage Association, a United States government-sponsored enterprise and publicly traded company. In 1991, he was appointed chairman and chief executive officer of Fannie Mae, a position he held until 1998. In 1996 Johnson published a book, Showing America a New Way Home.

An Office of Federal Housing Enterprise Oversight (OFHEO) report from September 2004 found that, during Johnson's tenure as CEO, Fannie Mae had improperly deferred $200 million in expenses. This enabled top executives, including Johnson and his successor, Franklin Raines, to receive substantial bonuses in 1998. A 2006 OFHEO report found that Fannie Mae had substantially under-reported Johnson's compensation. Originally reported as $6–7 million, Johnson actually received approximately $21 million.

In the 2011 book Reckless Endangerment: How Outsized Ambition, Greed and Corruption Led to Economic Armageddon, authors Gretchen Morgenson and Joshua Rosner wrote that Johnson was one of the key figures responsible for the 2008 financial crisis. Morgenson described him in an NPR interview as "corporate America's founding father of regulation manipulation". Andrew Ross Sorkin wrote in The New York Times in 2012, "In fairness to Mr. Johnson, the vast majority of losses racked up by Fannie were the results of loans bought after he departed."

Johnson was one of the first outside directors and the longest-serving board member of the investment bank Goldman Sachs. From 1999, when the company went public, until May 2018, he served as chairman of the compensation committee at Goldman Sachs. He also served on the board of Forestar Group, Gannett Company, Inc., KB Home, Target Corporation, Temple-Inland, and UnitedHealth Group. Johnson was also the vice chairman of the private banking firm Perseus.

Johnson chaired the vice presidential selection committee for the unsuccessful 2004 presidential campaign of John Kerry. There was speculation that, had Kerry won, Johnson might have been named Kerry's chief of staff, or Secretary of the Treasury.

On June 4, 2008, Barack Obama announced the formation of a three-person committee to vet vice presidential candidates, including Johnson, Caroline Kennedy, and Eric Holder. However, Johnson soon became a source of controversy when it was reported that he had received $7 million in cut-rate mortgage loans directly from Angelo Mozilo, the CEO of Countrywide Financial, a company implicated in the U.S. subprime mortgage crisis. Johnson resigned from the vice presidential search committee on June 11, 2008, stating that he had done nothing wrong but did not want to distract attention from Obama's "historical effort". He continued to assist in efforts to recruit former Hillary Clinton supporters to the Obama campaign. On September 19, 2008, the John McCain campaign released an ad critical of Obama for his connections to Johnson and for appointing him to the vice presidential search committee.

== Other memberships ==
Johnson has served as chairman of the Kennedy Center for the Arts (1996–2004) where he created and endowed the center's Millennium Stage. He was also chairman of the Brookings Institution (1994–2003) and continued thereafter to serve on the advisory council of the Brookings Institution's Hamilton Project. Since 2011, he has been chairman of the advisory council for the Stanford University Center on Longevity. He was a member of the American Academy of Arts and Sciences, the American Friends of Bilderberg, the Council on Foreign Relations, and the Trilateral Commission. Johnson was also a member of the steering committee of the Bilderberg Group and participated in all of their conferences since 1998 except in 1999 and 2004.

== Honors and accolades ==
In 1994, Johnson received the Honor Award from the National Building Museum for his contributions to the U.S.'s building heritage during his tenure at Fannie Mae. He was also named as a Washingtonian of the Year by Washingtonian magazine in 1998.

Johnson received an Honorary Doctor of Laws from Colby College in 1997, an Honorary Doctor of Humane Letters from Howard University in 1999, and Doctor of Laws from Skidmore College in 2002 and the University of Minnesota in 2006.

== Personal life ==
Johnson's first marriage was to Katherine Marshall. After they divorced, he married Maxine Isaacs, who served as press secretary for Mondale's 1984 election campaign. Together, they had a son (Alfred). They separated in 2010 and subsequently divorced. He married Heather Muir Kirby, a managing director at Deutsche Bank, in 2016.

Johnson's son, Alfred Johnson, served as Deputy Chief of Staff in the Department of the Treasury. He previously served in the Obama Administration, working as an aide to Rahm Emanuel.

Johnson died on October 18, 2020, at his home in Washington, D.C., at age 76; he had suffered from a neurological condition in the time leading up to his death.
