= Bank of America Home Loans =

Home loan division of Bank of America

- Type: Division of Bank of America
- Founded: March 14, 1969 (Countrywide); April 2009 (Bank of America Home Loans)
- Headquarters: Calabasas, California, USA (Countrywide Financial); Charlotte, North Carolina, USA (Bank of America)
- Revenue: $6,061,437,000 US$ (2007)
- Operating income: ▼$1,310,274,000 US$ (2007)
- Net income: ▼$703,538,000 US$ (2007)
- Parent: Bank of America
- Website: Bank of America Home Loans

Bank of America Home Loans is the mortgage unit of Bank of America. It previously existed as an independent company called Countrywide Financial from 1969 to 2008. In 2008, Bank of America purchased the failing Countrywide Financial for $4.1 billion. In 2006, Countrywide financed 20% of all mortgages in the United States, at a value of about 3.5% of the United States GDP, a proportion greater than any other single mortgage lender.

== History ==
Countrywide was founded in 1969 by David S. Loeb and Angelo Mozilo. Loeb died in 2003. The initial public offering was less than successful, with company stock trading over the counter at less than $1 per share. In 1985 Countrywide stock was re-listed on the New York Stock Exchange under the ticker symbol CFC.

Countrywide's stock has been described as the "23,000% stock" by Fortune magazine. Between 1982 and 2003, Countrywide delivered investors a 23,000.0% return, exceeding the returns of Washington Mutual, Walmart, and Warren Buffett's Berkshire Hathaway.

On January 11, 2008, Bank of America announced that it planned to purchase Countrywide Financial for $4.1 billion in stock. On June 5, 2008, Bank of America Corporation announced it had received approval from the Board of Governors of the Federal Reserve System to purchase Countrywide Financial Corporation. Then, on June 25, 2008, Countrywide announced it had received the approval of 69% of its shareholders to the planned merger with Bank of America. Finally, on July 1, 2008, Bank of America Corporation completed its purchase of Countrywide Financial Corporation. In 1997, Countrywide spun off Countrywide Mortgage Investment as an independent company called IndyMac Bank. Federal regulators seized IndyMac on July 11, 2008, after a week-long bank run.

== Businesses ==
Bank of America Home Loans is composed of:

- Mortgage Banking, which originates, purchases, securitizes, and services mortgages. During the year ended December 31, 2005, the Mortgage Banking segment generated 59% of the company's pre-tax earnings.
- Banking, which operates a federally chartered thrift that primarily invests in mortgage loans and home equity lines of credit primarily sourced through its mortgage banking operation.
- Capital Markets, which operates as an institutional broker-dealer that primarily specializes in trading and underwriting mortgage-backed securities.
- Global Operations, which provides mortgage loan application processing and loan servicing.

=== Mortgage banking ===
The Mortgage Banking segment produces mortgage loans through various channels on a national scale. Nearly all the mortgage loans the company produces in this segment are sold into the secondary market, mainly in mortgage-backed securities. In 2006, 45% of those mortgages were conventional non-conforming loans, loans too large to sell to Fannie Mae. The company generally performs the ongoing servicing functions related to the mortgage loans that it produces. It also provides various loan closing services, such as title, escrow, and appraisal.

The Mortgage Banking segment comprises three distinct sectors: Loan Production, Loan servicing, and Loan Closing Services.

==== Loan production ====
The role of Loan Production is to originate and fund new loans and to acquire already-funded loans through purchases from other lenders. Loan Production produces mortgage loans through four divisions of Countrywide Home Loans: Consumer Markets, Full Spectrum Lending, Wholesale Lending, and Correspondent Lending.

Consumer Markets and Full Spectrum Lending offer loans directly to consumers. Loans produced by these two retail divisions are originated, funded, and sold by Countrywide. Consumer Markets offers various products, whereas Full Spectrum Lending focuses primarily on products appropriate for customers with less than prime-quality credit.

Wholesale Lending offers loans to consumers whose loans are originated by another mortgage broker. These loans are funded and sold by Countrywide but originated by other lenders.

Correspondent Lending purchases mortgage loans from other lenders, which include mortgage bankers, commercial banks, savings and loan associations, home builders, and credit unions. These loans may be sold by Countrywide to end-investors on the secondary market but are originated and funded by other lenders.

==== Loan servicing ====
Loan servicing services loans, i.e., collect payments from the borrower, handles escrow accounts, tax and insurance payments (if applicable), then remit "advances" to the investor's trustee as specified in the Pooling and Servicing Agreement (PSA).

Loan servicing typically retains a fraction of the payment made (normally 25 – 75 basis points of the unpaid principal balance) as a "servicing fee".

Loan servicing also generates income in the form of interest on monies received and held before paying scheduled advances to the trustee, fees charged for late payments, force-placed insurance, document requests, legal fees, payoff statements, etc.

==== Loan closing services ====
LandSafe and its subsidiaries offer loan closing services, including real estate appraisal services, automated credit reporting products, flood determination services, and residential title services for the six major counties of Southern California.

=== Banking ===
The Banking segment consisted of Countrywide Bank, FSB, and Countrywide Warehouse Lending. Formerly, the bank was known as Countrywide Bank, N.A.. This nationally chartered bank was regulated jointly by the Office of the Comptroller of the Currency and the Federal Reserve. Still, it converted its charter to a federally chartered thrift that is regulated by the Office of Thrift Supervision. Countrywide Bank is the 3rd largest Savings and Loan institution and is the fastest-growing bank in United States history. Assets from deposits are currently approaching $125 billion.

Countrywide Bank primarily originates and purchases mortgage loans and home equity lines of credit for investment purposes. Most of these loans are sourced through its mortgage banking subsidiary, Countrywide Home Loans. In addition, the Bank obtains retail deposits, primarily certificates of deposit, through the Internet, call centers, and more than 200 financial centers, many of which were located in Countrywide Home Loans' retail branch offices as of April 1, 2007.

Countrywide Warehouse Lending provides warehouse lines of credit to mortgage bankers, who use these funds to originate loans. These mortgage bankers are primarily customers of Countrywide Home Loans' Correspondent Lending division and the Capital Markets divisions; the mortgage bankers use warehouse lines of credit from Countrywide Warehouse Lending to help originate loans, then sell those loans to Countrywide through Correspondent Lending or Capital Markets.

=== Capital markets ===
The Capital Markets segment primarily operates as a registered securities broker-dealer, a residential mortgage loan manager, and a commercial mortgage loan originator. CFC also operates broker-dealers in Japan and the United Kingdom, an introducing broker-dealer of futures contracts, an asset manager, and a broker of mortgage servicing rights. Except its commercial mortgage activities, the company transacts only with institutional customers, such as banks, other depository institutions, insurance companies, asset managers, mutual funds, pension plans, other broker-dealers and governmental agencies. Customers of its commercial real estate finance business are the owners or sponsors of commercial properties, who can be individuals or institutions.

Countrywide Asset Management Corporation manages the acquisition and disposition of loans from third parties and loans originated by Countrywide Home Loans on behalf of Countrywide Home Loans. These are typically delinquent or otherwise illiquid residential mortgage loans, which have primarily originated under Federal Housing Administration (FHA) and Veterans Administration (VA) programs. The Company attempts to rehabilitate the loans, using the servicing operations of Countrywide Home Loans, to securitize those loans that become eligible for securitization. The remaining loans are serviced through foreclosure and liquidation, including collecting government insurance and guarantee proceeds relating to defaulted FHA and VA program loans.

Securities trading activities include trading debt securities in the secondary market after the original issuance of the security. Underwriting activities encompass the assumption of the risk of buying a new issue of securities from the issuer and reselling the securities to investors, either directly or through dealers. Capital Markets primarily underwrites mortgage-related debt securities.

=== Insurance ===
The Insurance segment activities include offering property, casualty, life, and credit insurance as an underwriter and as an insurance agency and providing reinsurance coverage to primary mortgage insurers through two business units: Balboa Life and Casualty Operations, and Balboa Reinsurance Company.

Balboa Life and Casualty Group underwrite property, casualty, life, and credit insurance in all 50 states. Its products include Lender-Placed Property and Auto, which includes lender-placed auto insurance and lender-placed, real-property hazard insurance; Voluntary Homeowners and Auto, which underwrites retail homeowners insurance and home warranty plans for consumers; and Life and Credit, which underwrites term life, credit life, and credit disability insurance products.

Balboa Reinsurance Company provides a mezzanine layer of reinsurance coverage for losses between minimum and maximum specified amounts to the insurance companies that provide private mortgage insurance (PMI) on loans in its servicing portfolio. It provides this coverage concerning substantially all of the loans in the Company's portfolio that are covered by PMI, which generally includes all conventional loans with an original loan amount over 80% of the property's appraised value. It earns a portion of the PMI premiums in return for providing this coverage.

=== Global operations ===
The primary activities of the Global Operations segment was Global Home Loans (GHL): a UK third-party administrator (TPA) formed out of a joint venture between Countrywide and Woolwich plc in 1998. Activities included Loan Processing and subservicing, providing mortgage loan application processing, and mortgage loan subservicing in the United Kingdom.

Following the acquisition of Woolwich by Barclays plc, this relationship developed further, with GHL adding the servicing of the Barclays mortgage portfolio and expanding operations with the transfer of ownership of the Barclays mortgage operation in Leeds to GHL in 2003.

By 2005, GHL operation processed more than £11.3 billion ($20.3 billion) in loans, all of which are subserviced for Barclays, PLC, the joint venture partner. As of December 31, 2005, Global's subservicing portfolio was £59 billion ($102 billion).

In November 2005, Barclays announced that it intended to terminate the third party administration arrangement with GHL and bring the mortgage originations and servicing operations back in-house. This resulted in Countrywide buying out Barclays' remaining 30% stake in GHL. Barclays brought the operation back in-house in February 2006.

Following that acquisition Global's presence in the UK was confined to providing support to Barclays and Prudential Assurance, who continued to use the proprietary originations, servicing and arrears processing systems developed for GHL and Countrywide by Countrywide Technology Group (CWTG) until those systems were decommissioned in 2012.

A second venture in the UK, Valuation Services, provided one of the first electronic residential property valuation services to third parties in the United Kingdom through a majority-owned joint venture. This was sold to First American in 2007.

Offshore Services commenced operations in India in 2004. Set up to exploit the strategic advantage of employing systems specialists based in the sub-continent, it provides business process and technology services to the Parent Company and its subsidiaries in both the United States and the United Kingdom.

== Controversies ==
=== Employee and contract labor issues ===
In 2003, Countrywide was the subject of a class-action lawsuit alleging overtime violations. Countrywide was charged with working employees 10–15 hours per day, 6 to 7 days per week without compensating them for overtime wages. The lawsuit was settled in May 2005, with the payment of $30 million in compensation to 400 account executives. Additionally, Countrywide is one of many companies that conducts in-depth background searches of new employee applicants. The background search goes beyond typical employment, education, and criminal history searches, and enables a company to view the applicant's credit, and public record documents such as lawsuits and divorce records. Although it must be authorized by the applicant, Countrywide explicitly does not consider applicants who deny authorization for a search. This policy has led to otherwise qualified applicant complaints and dispute filings which claim this policy is discriminatory, invasive, and compromises the applicant's privacy.

Countrywide maintains a policy of not filing the legally required Internal Revenue Service Form 1099 to independent brokers. The validity of this is questionable however.

=== Minority and subprime borrowers ===
Countrywide agreed to a settlement with New York state attorney general Eliot Spitzer to compensate black and Hispanic borrowers improperly steered by Countrywide salespeople to higher-cost loans. The company also agreed to improve training and oversight of its loan officers and to pay New York state $200,000 to cover costs of the investigation.

Countrywide subprime documents show a policy of lending to families with as little as $1000 of disposable income, often compromising their ability to pay living expenses.

Economist Stan Liebowitz writes that the Fannie Mae Foundation singled out Countrywide Financial as a "paragon" of a nondiscriminatory lender who works with community activists, following "the most flexible underwriting criteria permitted." The chief executive of Countrywide is said to have bragged that in order to approve minority applications, "lenders have had to stretch the rules a bit." Countrywide's commitment to low-income loans had grown to $600 billion by early 2003.

=== Hurricanes Katrina, Gustav and Rita complaints ===
Some customers have complained that after the devastating hurricanes Katrina, Gustav and Rita, Countrywide told loan customers in the affected areas that they could take a break on payments without any late fees, and the payments would be added back to the end of the loan. They now contend that Countrywide forced the loan customers to pay the missed payments in a lump sum, along with late fees they were told they did not have to pay, within 30 days or face foreclosure.

=== "Friends of Angelo" VIP program ===
In June 2008 Conde Nast Portfolio reported that numerous Washington D.C. politicians over recent years had received mortgage financing at noncompetitive rates because the corporation considered the officeholders "FOA's" — "Friends of Angelo" (Countrywide Chief Executive Angelo Mozilo). The politicians extended such favorable financing included the chairman of the Senate Banking Committee, Christopher Dodd, and the chairman of the Senate Budget Committee, Kent Conrad. The article also noted Countrywide's political action committee had made large donations to Dodd's campaign. Senator Dodd proposed that the federal government buy up to $400 billion in defaulted mortgages. Citizens for Responsibility and Ethics in Washington (CREW) has called for House and Senate to investigate Senators Conrad and Dodd.

It was reported that James Johnson, former CEO of Fannie Mae and an adviser to presidential candidate Barack Obama, had received loans under the "Friends of Angelo". Johnson announced he would step down from the vice-presidential vetting position on June 11, 2008, in order to avoid being a distraction to Obama's campaign.

In June 2008 The Wall Street Journal reported that Franklin Raines, a former CEO of Fannie Mae, received below market rates loans at Countrywide Financial because the corporation also considered him an "FOA". He received loans for over $3 million while CEO of Fannie Mae. On July 16, 2008, The Washington Post reported that Franklin Raines had "taken calls from Barack Obama's presidential campaign seeking his advice on mortgage and housing policy matters." Subsequent attempts to connect Obama's campaign with Franklin Raines were characterized by The Washington Post as "a stretch".

=== Lawsuits ===
The office of Attorney General of Illinois, Lisa Madigan, filed a civil lawsuit in Cook County Circuit Court against Countrywide Financial Corporation on June 25, 2008. The lawsuit cites information gathered from documents obtained via a subpoena in the fall of 2007. Madigan's office claims the "mortgage lender engaged in "unfair and deceptive" practices to get homeowners to apply for risky mortgages far beyond their means."

California Attorney General, Jerry Brown, followed suit by filing a similar lawsuit on June 25, 2008, accusing the lender of breaking the state's laws against false advertising and unfair business practices. The lawsuit also claims the defendant mislead many consumers by misinforming them about the workings of certain mortgages such adjustable-rate mortgages, interest-only loans, low-documentation loans and home-equity loans while telling borrowers they would be able to refinance before the interest rate on their loans adjusted.

In August 2008, Connecticut Attorney General Richard Blumenthal also brought suit against Countrywide, alleging that deceptive lending practices had ripped off Connecticut homeowners.

The suit was settled in October 2008 after Bank of America acquired Countrywide. The settlement involves the modifying of troubled 'predatory loans' up to $8.4 billion. The states currently involved in the settlement are Arizona, California, Connecticut, Florida, Iowa, Michigan, North Carolina, Ohio, Texas, and Washington. Other states may also join the settlement.

There is also a shareholder class action lawsuit for investors in asset-backed securities from Countrywide.

== Subprime mortgage crisis ==
=== Secondary market disruption ===
When Countrywide finances mortgage loans, they usually packaged them for sale to large investors as mortgage-backed securities. Fannie Mae or Freddie Mac can only buy loans which conform to the standards of government-sponsored enterprises. Non-conforming mortgages securities must be sold in the private, secondary market to alternative investors. On August 3, 2007, this secondary market essentially stopped trading most of the non-conforming securities. Secondary mortgage market disruptions had happened previously, but, the new disruption appeared more serious, both larger in range and likely duration. Alt-A mortgages (loans given to apparently creditworthy borrowers without much or any documentation) completely stopped at ratings lower than AAA. Difficulties extended to much of AAA-rated mortgage-backed securities. Only securities with conforming mortgages were trading. Countrywide Financial issued a statement that its mortgage business has access to a nearly $50 billion funding cushion.

After the collapse of American Home Mortgage on August 6, 2007, attention returned to Countrywide Financial which at the time had issued about 17% of all mortgages in the United States. Only days later, Countrywide Financial disclosed to the U.S. Securities and Exchange Commission (SEC) that these disruptions in the secondary mortgage markets could hurt it financially:

Since the company is highly dependent on the availability of credit to finance its operations, disruptions in the debt markets or a reduction in our credit ratings could have an adverse impact on our earnings and financial condition, particularly in the short term… Current conditions in the debt markets include reduced liquidity and increased credit risk premiums for certain market participants. These conditions, which increase the cost and reduce the availability of debt, may continue or worsen in the future…. There can be no assurance, however, that the Company will be successful in these efforts, that such facilities will be adequate or that the cost of debt will allow us to operate at profitable levels.

This raised speculation that Countrywide was a potential bankruptcy risk. On August 10, a run on the bank began as the secondary mortgage market shut down, curtailing new mortgage funding.

The perceived risk of Countrywide bonds rose. Fitch, Moody's and Standard & Poor's credit ratings agencies downgraded Countrywide 1 or 2 grades, some to near junk status. The cost of insuring its bonds rose 22% overnight. This also limited its access to commercial paper. Some institutional investors admitted trying to sell Countrywide paper. Fifty other mortgage lenders had already filed for Chapter 11 bankruptcy, and Countrywide Financial was cited as a possible bankruptcy risk by Merrill Lynch and others on August 15. This combined with news that its ability to issue new commercial paper might be severely hampered put severe pressure on the stock. Its shares fell $3.17 to $21.29, which was its biggest fall in a single day since the crash of 1987 – the shares had fallen 50% so far that year. On August 15, 2007, Merrill Lynch advised its clients to sell their stock in Countrywide.

=== Announcement of problems and bailouts ===
On Thursday, August 16, 2007, the company expressed concerns over liquidity because of the decline of the secondary market for securitized mortgage obligations. Countrywide also announced its intent to draw on the entire $11.5 billion credit line from a group of 40 banks including JPMorgan Chase. On Friday August 17, many depositors sought to withdraw their bank accounts. Countrywide also planned to make 90% of its loans conforming. By this point stock shares had lost about 75% of their peak value and speculation of bankruptcy broadened. At the same time the Federal Reserve Bank lowered the discount rate 0.5% in a last-minute, early morning conference call. The Fed accepted about $17.2 billion in repurchase agreements for mortgage backed securities to aid in liquidity. This also helped calm the stock market and investors promptly responded positively with the Dow posting gains.

Additionally, the firm was forced to restate income it had claimed from accrued but unpaid interest on "exotic" mortgages where the initial pay rate was less than the amortization rate. In 2007 it became apparent much of this interest had become uncollectable.

In a letter dated August 20, Federal Reserve agreed to waive banking regulations at the request of Citigroup and Bank of America. The Fed agreed to exempt both banks from rules that limited the amount that federally insured banks can lend to related brokerage companies to 10% of bank capital. Until then, banking regulation was that banks with federally insured deposits should not be put at risk by brokerage subsidiaries' activities. On August 23, Citibank and Bank of America said that they and two other banks accessed $500 million in 30-day financing at the Fed's discount window. The same day, Countrywide Financial obtained $2 billion of new capital from Bank of America Corp. For this the Bank of America brokerage arm would get convertible preferred stock.

On November 26, 2007, Countrywide stock was hammered on the NYSE, dropping over 10% to a level of $8.64/share; less than half the share's value in August when the firm faced bankruptcy rumors and a fraction of its value in 2006. One proximate cause was reports that the Atlanta Federal Home Loan Bank had extended a large amount of its credit to Countrywide to offset its inability to raise funds in the private market. Senator Chuck Schumer called for an investigation as to the prudence of the FHLBB's action in this regard.

From 2005 to 2007, Angelo R. Mozilo sold much of his CFC stock realizing $291.5 million in profits. A class action suit was filed on behalf of shareholders alleging securities violations.

In September 2008, Countrywide sent letters to its mortgage customers to inform that one of their employees had stolen identity information that contained social security numbers and birth dates. Countrywide apologized in the letter and offered free credit monitoring for 90 days.

=== 'Protect Our House' PR campaign ===
In September 2007, after months of negative publicity and the announcement of a reduction of 20% of its workforce, Countrywide launched a public relations campaign aimed at demoralized employees. Employees were expected to sign a loyalty oath to "demonstrate their commitment to our efforts" and "to tell the Countrywide story to all". Those who signed the pledge received a green rubber Protect Our House wristband while, according to a senior CFC officer, those not signing would lose their jobs.

=== Takeover ===
The endgame in Bank of America's $4 billion takeover of Countrywide Financial began with a December phone call from Countrywide Chief Executive Angelo Mozilo to his Bank of America counterpart, Kenneth D. Lewis. And on January 11, 2008, Bank of America announced it had agreed to buy Countrywide for $4 billion in an all-stock transaction. The stock's value settled at about $5½ per share following the announcement; it had been as low as $4.43 before the Bank of America deal was announced. Bank of America Corp finally acquired Countrywide in 2008 for $2.5 billion.

After more than six months of financial deterioration at Countrywide—despite a $2 billion infusion of cash from Bank of America in August—Mozilo said he was ready to throw in the towel, according to Lewis.

At the same time, having watched Countrywide dramatically retool its operations in a bid to survive, Bank of America executives began to believe Countrywide's big U.S. mortgage business might be worth having.

The ability to get that kind of size and scale became more appealing as we saw the business model change to a model we could accept," Lewis said. "We considered the lawsuits, the negative publicity that Countrywide had. We weighed the short-term pain versus what we think will be a very good deal for our shareholders.

Bank of America deployed 60 analysts from its headquarters in Charlotte, N.C., to Countrywide's headquarters in Calabasas, Calif. After four weeks analyzing Countrywide's legal and financial predicament, and modeling how its loan portfolio was likely to perform, Bank of America offered an all-stock deal valued at $4 billion for Countrywide—a fraction of the company's $24 billion market value a year ago. Countrywide shareholders approved the deal on June 25, 2008, and it closed July 2, 2008. Bank of America announced on June 26, 2008, that the takeover of Countrywide Financial Corp. will result in the loss of 7,500 jobs over the next two years.

The deal was a landmark in the housing crisis, given Countrywide's prominence as the nation's largest mortgage lender, at the time. It was to prove more costly to Bank of America, however, than was perceived at the time: in August 2014, Bank of America was forced to agree to a near-$17 billion deal to settle claims against it relating to the sale of toxic mortgage-linked securities, a large percentage of which had been sold by Countrywide.

=== SEC charges ===
On June 4, 2009, the U.S. Securities and Exchange Commission charged former CEO Angelo Mozilo with insider trading and securities fraud, and former COO David Sambol and former CFO Eric Sieracki with securities fraud for failing to disclose Countrywide's lax lending standards in Countrywide's 2006 annual report. Despite these charges, Countrywide, and then its successor Bank of America, were awarded the Property Management contract with the Veterans Administration. A July 22, 2008, memo from Judith Caden, VA Director of Loan Guaranty Service issued this proclamation in Circular 26-08-10. Bank of America still retained this position with VA until 2011.

== See also ==
- United States housing bubble
- New Century Financial
