= Flannery (disambiguation) =

Flannery is a convention in the game of contract bridge.

Flannery may also refer to:

== People ==
=== Surname ===
- Austin Flannery (1925–2008), a Dominican priest, editor, publisher and social justice campaigner
- Brian Flannery (born 1974), Irish hurler
- Brian P. Flannery, physicist who variously worked as an astrophysicist and as a climate modeller for ExxonMobil
- Bridget Flannery (born 1959), Irish painter
- Bryan Flannery (born 1967), American politician
- Chris Flannery (rugby league) (born 1980), Australian rugby player
- Christopher Dale Flannery (1948–1985), Australian hitman
- Constance O'Day-Flannery, American author
- Dan Flannery, rugby league footballer
- Daniel Flannery (born 1952), American artist, producer, director, and designer
- Denis Flannery (1928–2012), Australian rugby player
- Edward Flannery (1912–1998), American priest and author
- Fearghal Flannery (born 1991), Irish hurler
- Frank Flannery, political consultant and Fine Gael's former Director of Organisations and Strategy
- Harry Flannery (1900–1975), America journalist and author
- J. Harold Flannery (1898–1961), American politician
- Jack Flannery (1952–2010), American off-road racing driver
- James Flannery (Ohio politician) (1938–2005), American politician
- James Fortescue Flannery (1851–1943), British engineer and politician
- Jerry Flannery (born 1978), Irish rugby player
- John Flannery (American football) (born 1969), American football player
- John L. Flannery (born 1962), American business executive
- Jude Flannery (died 1997), American triathlete
- Kate Flannery (born 1964), American actress
- Kent V. Flannery (born 1934), American archaeologist
- Lot Flannery (1836–1922), American sculptor
- Mark Flannery, American economist
- Martin Flannery (Australian politician) (1885–1935), Australian politician
- Martin Flannery (British politician) (1918–2006), British politician
- Michael Flannery (1902–1994), Irish republican who fought in the Irish War of Independence and the Irish Civil War
- Mick Flannery (born 1983), Irish singer-songwriter
- Nathan Flannery (born 1992), New Zealand rower
- Niall Flannery (born 1991), English hurdler
- Nickoletta Flannery (born 1999), Australian footballer
- Paddy Flannery (born 1976), British football player
- Pat Flannery (born 1957), American basketball coach
- Paula Flannery (born 1974), New Zealand cricketer
- Peter Flannery (born 1951), British playwright
- Ray Flannery (physicist) (1941–2013), Irish theoretical physicist
- Sarah Flannery (born 1982), Irish computer scientist
- Susan Flannery (born 1939), American actress
- Thomas Aquinas Flannery (1918–2007), American judge
- Tim Flannery (baseball) (born 1957), American baseball player
- Tim Flannery (born 1956), Australian scientist and activist
- Tom Flannery (born 1966), American singer-songwriter
- Tony Flannery (born 1948), Irish writer
- William Flannery (1898–1959), American art director
- William Flannery (bridge), American bridge player

=== Given name ===
- Flannery O'Connor (1925–1964), American writer

== Other uses ==
- Cape Flannery, at the west end of Thule Island in the South Sandwich Islands
- Flannery baronets, a title in the Baronetage of the United Kingdom
- Flannery (Pokémon), a fictional character in the Pokémon universe

== See also ==
- Flanery, an Irish surname, variant of Flannery
