= Association of Catholics in Ireland =

Association of Roman Catholic laity

The Association of Catholics in Ireland (ACI) is a voluntary association of Roman Catholic laity in Ireland. The association was established in November 2012 with the objective of pursuing a reform and renewal agenda in the Irish Catholic Church based on the pastoral teachings of the Second Vatican Council. The Association is organised on an all-island basis and membership is open to all who share its objectives. The views of the association may be contrasted with those who support Traditionalist Catholic positions.

== Objectives ==
At a meeting held in the Regency Hotel, Drumcondra on 10 November 2012, the interim steering committee proposed a statement of objectives and a programme of work. The assembled members approved the text below :

"The Association of Catholics in Ireland is committed to the pursuit of a reform and renewal agenda in the Irish Catholic Church based on the letter and spirit of Vatican II. We are committed to helping to re-build, through words and deeds, a united Church based on the teachings of Jesus Christ – a Church that is inclusive, compassionate, accepts the equality of all believers, based on baptism, and which acknowledges its failures."

The programme of work that was also approved by the assembly hopes to bring about:

- a renewed understanding of the primacy of the individual conscience
- the full participation of women in every aspect of the Church
- a recognition of the wisdom of God's people in the shaping of Catholic teaching, especially in the areas of sexuality, ecumenism and ecology
- justice, in accordance with Gospel values, in our Church and society.

== Background ==
The Roman Catholic Church in Ireland has been the subject of criticism following publication of state sponsored reports into abuses such as the Ferns Report, the Ryan Report and the Murphy Report. Among other things, the reports found:

- that some bishops and senior church figures did not act on complaints of abuse, allowed abusers to continue in office amid a "culture of self-serving secrecy", and that government inspectors failed to stop the abuses.
- that the Dublin Archdiocese's preoccupations in dealing with cases of child sexual abuse, at least until the mid-1990s, were the maintenance of secrecy, the avoidance of scandal, the protection of the reputation of the Church, and the preservation of its assets.
- that the welfare of children and justice for victims, were subordinated to these priorities.

These scandals and the perceived inadequacy of the ecclesiastical response had the effect of eroding the trust placed by the laity in the hierarchy. The response of the Holy See was to send Apostolic visitors to Ireland whose report was published in 2012. The reaction of One in Four lobby group was that "the Vatican is still not accepting responsibility for its role in creating the culture of purposeful cover-ups of the sexual abuse of children". The report notes that many lay people have experienced a loss of trust in their pastors, while many good priests and religious have felt unjustly tainted by association.

In an attempt to bridge this communications gap between the laity and the institutional church, the Association of Catholic Priests was formed:

"The ACP wants to have a conversation about the realities of Irish Church life today and about issues we believe the Irish Church urgently needs to discuss....At a time when our Church has lost so much credibility in so many areas, we need the pastoral and intellectual credibility of a robust debate in the Irish Church and the much-needed confidence that will bring.

Following the annual general meeting (AGM) of the Association of Catholic Priests, it was agreed that there was a need for a related but separate association for lay people. An interim meeting, convened with the assistance of the ACP took place in All Hallows College, Drumcondra in May 2012.

== Leadership and structure ==
At the interim meeting, a steering committee prepared the organisation's next steps. There are eight members of this committee: Tom Curran (Meath Diocese), Martin Murray (Down and Connor Diocese and "Voice of the Faithful"), Tony Corcoran (Pobal Dé and Dublin Diocese), Jacqueline Nelson ("We are Church Ireland" and Dublin Diocese), Noel McCann, Cathy Molloy (theologian), Patricia Higgins. Speaking at the meeting, Tom Curran said "we have a very close relationship with the ACP, and it is from them that we have emerged". The interim leadership emphasises that it is a mainstream organisation in communion with the Holy See:

We are a main-stream [sic] organisation and won't allow ourselves be marginalised.

Committee member Noel McCann said their intention was to build a coalition of people to represent groups and individuals across the country:

We hope that by creating a critical mass of people in terms of numbers, we will get a voice at the table and be sufficiently strong to be able to articulate our views in a way that we will be listened to.

At the approval meeting of the ACI, which was attended by about 350 people, it was agreed to set up a website and governance structures, with elections to be held at an AGM to be convened at an unspecified date in 2013. At that time, a formal public launch is planned to take place accompanied by a recruitment campaign. In launching their website, the organisation hopes to facilitate the building of an on-line community and that the website will play a central role in empowering members in terms of expressing their views and influencing the direction which the association will take in the years ahead.

=== Activities ===
The ACI organised an event in April 2018 to discuss the forthcoming World Meeting of Families in Ireland which was due to be attended by Pope Francis. The ACI chairman — Anthony Neville — said that the ACI wanted to see a Church that "accepts the equality of all believers by virtue of their baptism":

"We are conscious of the possibility that at the World Meeting the bishops will present the 'perfect' Catholic family: mother, father, two children attending Mass every week, and everything in the garden is rosy"
