= Government policies and the subprime mortgage crisis =

Government policies and the subprime mortgage crisis covers the United States government policies and its impact on the subprime mortgage crisis of 2007–2009. The U.S. subprime mortgage crisis was a set of events and conditions that led to the 2008 financial crisis and subsequent recession. It was characterized by a rise in subprime mortgage delinquencies and foreclosures, and the resulting decline of securities backed by said mortgages. Several major financial institutions collapsed in September 2008, with significant disruption in the flow of credit to businesses and consumers and the onset of a severe global recession.

Government housing policies, over-regulation, failed regulation and deregulation have all been claimed as causes of the crisis, along with many others. While the modern financial system evolved, regulation did not keep pace and became mismatched with the risks building in the economy. The Financial Crisis Inquiry Commission (FCIC) tasked with investigating the causes of the crisis reported in January 2011 that: "We had a 21st-century financial system with 19th-century safeguards."

Increasing home ownership has been the goal of several presidents, including Roosevelt, Reagan, Clinton, and George W. Bush. Some experts say the events were driven by the private sector, with the major investment banks at the core of the crisis not subject to depository banking regulations such as the CRA. In addition, housing bubbles appeared in several European countries at the same time, although U.S. housing policies did not apply there. Further, subprime lending roughly doubled (from below 10% of mortgage originations, to around 20% from 2004 to 2006), although there were no major changes to long-standing housing laws around that time. Only 1 of the 10 FCIC commissioners argued housing policies were a primary cause of the crisis, mainly in the context of steps Fannie Mae and Freddie Mac took to compete with aggressive private sector competition.

Failure to regulate the non-depository banking system (also called the shadow banking system) has also been blamed. The non-depository system grew to exceed the size of the regulated depository banking system, but the investment banks, insurers, hedge funds, and money market funds were not subject to the same regulations. Many of these institutions suffered the equivalent of a bank run, with the notable collapses of Lehman Brothers and AIG during September 2008 precipitating a financial crisis and subsequent recession.

The government also repealed or implemented several laws that limited the regulation of the banking industry, such as the repeal of the Glass-Steagall Act and implementation of the Commodity Futures Modernization Act of 2000. The former allowed depository and investment banks to merge while the latter limited the regulation of financial derivatives.

Note: A general discussion of the causes of the subprime mortgage crisis is included in Subprime mortgage crisis, Causes and Causes of the Great Recession. This article focuses on a subset of causes related to affordable housing policies, Fannie Mae and Freddie Mac and government regulation.

== Legislative and regulatory overview ==
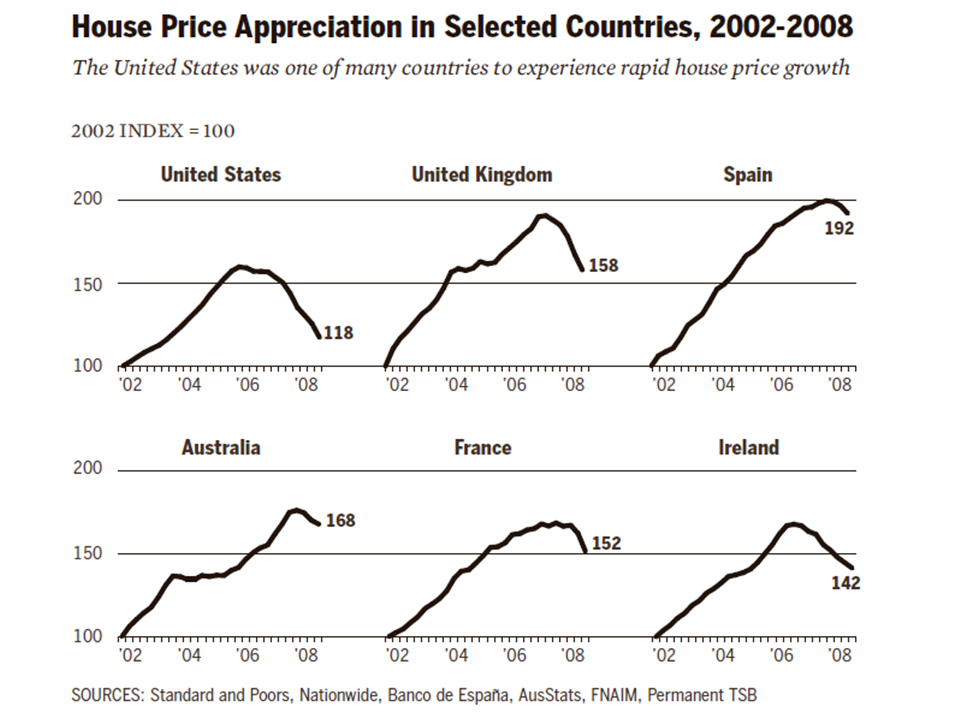
Housing price appreciation in selected countries, 2002–2008. The nature of the housing bubble in both the U.S. and Europe indicates U.S. housing policies were not a primary cause.

Deregulation, excess regulation, and failed regulation by the federal government have all been blamed for the subprime mortgage crisis in the United States.

Conservatives have claimed that the financial crisis was caused by too much regulation aimed at increasing home ownership rates for lower income people. They have pointed to two policies in particular: the Community Reinvestment Act (CRA) of 1977 (particularly as modified in the 1990s), which they claim pressured private banks to make risky loans, and HUD affordable housing goals for the government-sponsored enterprises ("GSEs") — Fannie Mae and Freddie Mac — which they claim caused the GSEs to purchase risky loans, and led to a general breakdown in underwriting standards for all lending. As early as February 2004, in testimony before the U.S. Senate Banking Committee, Alan Greenspan (chairman of the Federal Reserve) raised serious concerns regarding the systemic financial risk that Fannie Mae and Freddie Mac represented. He implored Congress to take actions to avert a crisis. The GSEs dispute these studies and dismissed Greenspan's testimony.

Liberals have claimed that GSE loans were less risky and performed better than loans securitized by more lightly regulated Wall Street banks. They also suggest that CRA loans mandated by the government performed better than subprime loans that were purely market-driven. They also present data which suggests that financial firms that lobbied the government most aggressively also had the riskiest lending practices, and lobbied for relief from regulations that were limiting their ability to take greater risks. In testimony before Congress both the Securities and Exchange Commission (SEC) and Alan Greenspan claimed failure in allowing the self-regulation of investment banks. Further, the five largest investment banks at the core of the crisis (including Bear Stearns and Lehman Brothers) were not subject to the CRA or other depository banking regulations, and they did not originate mortgages.

The Financial Crisis Inquiry Commission issued three concluding documents in January 2011: 1) The FCIC "conclusions" or report from the six Democratic Commissioners; 2) a "dissenting statement" from the three Republican Commissioners; and 3) a second "dissenting statement" from Commissioner Peter Wallison. Both the Democratic majority conclusions and Republican minority dissenting statement, representing the views of nine of the ten commissioners, concluded that government housing policies had little to do with the crisis. The majority report stated that Fannie Mae and Freddie Mac "were not a primary cause of the crisis" and that the Community Reinvestment Act "was not a significant factor in subprime lending or the crisis." The three Republican authors of their dissenting statement wrote: "Credit spreads declined not just for housing, but also for other asset classes like commercial real estate. This tells us to look to the credit bubble as an essential cause of the U.S. housing bubble. It also tells us that problems with U.S. housing policy or markets do not by themselves explain the U.S. housing bubble."

However, Commissioner Wallison's dissenting statement did place the blame squarely on government housing policies, which in his view contributed to an excessive number of high-risk mortgages: "...I believe that the sine qua non of the financial crisis was U.S. government housing policy, which led to the creation of 27 million subprime and other risky loans—half of all mortgages in the United States—which were ready to default as soon as the massive 1997–2007 housing bubble began to deflate. If the U.S. government had not chosen this policy path—fostering the growth of a bubble of unprecedented size and an equally unprecedented number of weak and high risk residential mortgages—the great financial crisis of 2008 would never have occurred."

In a working paper released in late 2012 to the National Bureau of Economic Research (NBER) (the arbiters of the Business Cycle), 4 economists presented their thesis "Did the Community Reinvestment Act Lead to Risky Lending?" The economists compared "the lending behavior of banks undergoing CRA exams within a given census tract in a given month (the treatment group) to the behavior of banks operating in the same census tract-month that did not face these exams (the control group). This comparison clearly indicates that adherence to the CRA led to riskier lending by banks." They concluded: "The evidence shows that around CRA examinations, when incentives to conform to CRA standards are particularly high, banks not only increase lending rates but also appear to originate loans that are markedly riskier. This paper has been criticized as being based a logical fallacy: that claims to "prove causality" are "impossible given their methodology". Additionally it was criticized for not considering an alternate explanation: "that bank officers deliberately make bad loans."

== Deregulation ==
The FCIC placed significant blame for the crisis on deregulation, reporting: "We conclude widespread failures in financial regulation and supervision proved devastating to the stability of the nation’s financial markets. The sentries were not at their posts, in no small part due to the widely accepted faith in the self-correcting nature of the markets and the ability of financial institutions to effectively police themselves. More than 30 years of deregulation and reliance on self-regulation by financial institutions, championed by former Federal Reserve chairman Alan Greenspan and others, supported by successive administrations and Congresses, and actively pushed by the powerful financial industry at every turn, had stripped away key safeguards, which could have helped avoid catastrophe. This approach had opened up gaps in oversight of critical areas with trillions of dollars at risk, such as the shadow banking system and over-the-counter derivatives markets. In addition, the government permitted financial firms to pick their preferred regulators in what became a race to the weakest supervisor." Similarly, a detailed report by the independent not-for-profit consumer watchdog organizations Essential Information and the Consumer Education Foundation identifies a dozen steps of deregulation that set the stage for the 2007-2008 meltdown, including:

- the 1999 repeal of the Glass-Steagall Act, which had prohibited commercial banks from undertaking investment banking operations (and vice versa);
- repeal of regulations banning off-balance sheet accounting practices, which entail accounting maneuvers that enable financial institutions to cloak their liabilities;
- preventing the Commodity Futures Trading Commission from regulating derivatives;
- the prohibition by the Commodity Futures Modernization Act of 2000 of the regulation of derivatives;
- adoption in 2004 by the Securities and Exchange Commission of "voluntary regulation" for investment banks;
- adoption of rules by global regulators to allow commercial banks to determine their own capital reserve requirements;
- refusal by regulators to prohibit rampant predatory lending and their ceasing of the enforcement of regulations that were already on the books that banned such lending practices;
- preempting, by federal bank regulators, of state consumer laws that restrict predatory lending; federal rules preventing victims of predatory lending from suing financial firms that purchased mortgages from the banks that had issued the original loan to the victims;
- expansion by Fannie Mae and Freddie Mac into the subprime mortgage market;
- ignoring of traditional anti-trust legal principles and thus allowing financial institutions to continue to expand and to merge, which led to the emergence of huge banking conglomerates that were deemed "too big to fail;"
- allowing private credit rating companies to score incorrectly the risks associated with mortgage-backed securities despite their conflicts of interest;
- the 2006 enactment of a statute to restrict regulation by the SEC of financial institution.

To achieve these deregulatory aims, the financial industry, including commercial and investment banks, hedge funds, real estate companies and insurance companies, made $1.725 billion in political campaign contributions and spent $3.4 billion on industry lobbyists during the years 1998–2008. In 2007, close to 3,000 federal lobbyists worked for the industry. Overall, the financial industry spent more than $5 billion over a decade to strengthen its political clout in Washington, DC.

== Mortgage and banking regulation ==
=== Alternative Mortgage Transaction Parity Act of 1982 ===
In 1982, Congress passed the Alternative Mortgage Transactions Parity Act (AMTPA), which allowed non-federally chartered housing creditors to write adjustable-rate mortgages. Among the new mortgage loan types created and gaining in popularity in the early 1980s were adjustable-rate, option adjustable-rate, balloon-payment and interest-only mortgages. These new loan types are credited with replacing the long-standing practice of banks making conventional fixed-rate, amortizing mortgages. Among the criticisms of banking industry deregulation that contributed to the savings and loan crisis was that Congress failed to enact regulations that would have prevented exploitations by these loan types. Subsequent widespread abuses of predatory lending occurred with the use of adjustable-rate mortgages. Approximately 90% of subprime mortgages issued in 2006 were adjustable-rate mortgages.

=== The Housing and Community Development Act of 1992 ===
This legislation established an "affordable housing" loan purchase mandate for Fannie Mae and Freddie Mac, and that mandate was to be regulated by HUD. Initially, the 1992 legislation required that 30% or more of Fannie's and Freddie's loan purchases be related to "affordable housing" (borrowers who were below normal lending standards). However, HUD was given the power to set future requirements, and HUD soon increased the mandates. This encouraged "subprime" mortgages. (See HUD Mandates, below.)

=== Repeal of the Glass Steagall Act ===
The Glass–Steagall Act was enacted after the Great Depression. It separated commercial banks and investment banks, in part to avoid potential conflicts of interest between the lending activities of the former and rating activities of the latter. In 1999, President Bill Clinton signed into law Gramm-Leach-Bliley Act, which repealed portions of the Glass-Steagall Act. Economist Joseph Stiglitz criticized the repeal of the Act. He called its repeal the "culmination of a $300 million lobbying effort by the banking and financial services industries..." He believes it contributed to this crisis because the risk-taking culture of investment banking dominated the more risk-averse commercial banking culture, leading to increased levels of risk-taking and leverage during the boom period.

"Alice M. Rivlin, who served as a deputy director of the Office of Management and Budget under Bill Clinton, said that GLB was a necessary piece of legislation because the separation of investment and commercial banking 'wasn't working very well.'" Bill Clinton stated (in 2008): "I don't see that signing that bill had anything to do with the current crisis." Luigi Zingales argues that the repeal had an indirect effect. It aligned the formerly competing investment and commercial banking sectors to lobby in common cause for laws, regulations and reforms favoring the credit industry.

Economists Robert Kuttner and Paul Krugman have supported the contention that the repeal of the Glass–Steagall Act contributing to the subprime meltdown although Krugman reversed himself several years late saying that repealing Glass-Steagall is "not what caused the financial crisis, which arose instead from 'shadow banks.'" Andrew Ross Sorkin believes the repeal was not the problem. The vast majority of failures were either due to poorly performing mortgage loans, permissible under Glass-Steagall, or losses by institutions who did not engage in commercial banking and thus were never covered by the act.

Peter J. Wallison points out that none of the major investment banks that were hit by the crisis, "Bear, Lehman, Merrill, Goldman, or Morgan Stanley — were affiliated with commercial banks" but were stand-alone investment banks allowable by Glass-Steagall. The mortgage banks, Wachovia, Washington Mutual, and IndyMac, were also independent banks existing before the repeal of Glass.

=== Capital requirements and risk classification ===
Capital requirements refer to the amount of financial cushion that banks must maintain in the event their investments suffer losses. Depository banks will take deposits and purchase assets with them, assuming not all deposits will be called back by depositors. The riskier the assets the bank selects, the higher the capital requirements to offset the risk. Depository banks were subject to extensive regulation and oversight prior to the crisis. Deposits are also guaranteed by the FDIC up to specific limits.

However, depository banks had moved sizable amounts of assets and liabilities off-balance sheet, via complex legal entities called special purpose vehicles. This allowed the banks to remove these amounts from the capital requirements computation, allowing them to take on more risk, but make higher profits during the pre-crisis boom period. When these off-balance sheet vehicles encountered difficulties beginning in 2007, many depository banks were required to cover their losses. Martin Wolf wrote in June 2009: "...an enormous part of what banks did in the early part of this decade – the off-balance-sheet vehicles, the derivatives and the 'shadow banking system' itself – was to find a way round regulation."

Unlike depository banks, investment banks raise capital to fund underwriting, market-making and trading for their own account or their clients; they are not subject to the same oversight or capital requirements. Large investment banks at the center of the crisis in September 2008, such as Lehman Brothers and Merrill Lynch, were not subject to the same capital requirements as depository banks (see the section on the shadow banking system below for more information). The ratio of debt to equity (a measure of the risk taken) rose significantly from 2003 to 2007 for the largest five investment banks, which had $4.1 trillion in debt by the end of 2007.

FDIC Chair Sheila Bair cautioned during 2007 against the more flexible risk management standards of the Basel II accord and lowering bank capital requirements generally: "There are strong reasons for believing that banks left to their own devices would maintain less capital—not more—than would be prudent. The fact is, banks do benefit from implicit and explicit government safety nets. Investing in a bank is perceived as a safe bet. Without proper capital regulation, banks can operate in the marketplace with little or no capital. And governments and deposit insurers end up holding the bag, bearing much of the risk and cost of failure. History shows this problem is very real … as we saw with the U.S. banking and S & L crisis in the late 1980s and 1990s. The final bill for inadequate capital regulation can be very heavy. In short, regulators can't leave capital decisions totally to the banks. We wouldn't be doing our jobs or serving the public interest if we did."

== Boom and collapse of the shadow banking system ==
The non-depository banking system grew to exceed the size of the regulated depository banking system. However, the investment banks, insurers, hedge funds, and money market funds within the non-depository system were not subject to the same regulations as the depository system, such as depositor insurance and bank capital restrictions. Many of these institutions suffered the equivalent of a bank run with the notable collapses of Lehman Brothers and AIG during September 2008 precipitating a financial crisis and subsequent recession.

The FCIC report explained how this evolving system remained ineffectively regulated: "In the early part of the 20th century, we erected a series of protections—the Federal Reserve as a lender of last resort, federal deposit insurance, ample regulations—to provide a bulwark against the panics that had regularly plagued America’s banking system in the 19th century. Yet, over the past 30-plus years, we permitted the growth of a shadow banking system—opaque and laden with shortterm debt—that rivaled the size of the traditional banking system. Key components of the market—for example, the multitrillion-dollar repo lending market, off-balance-sheet entities, and the use of over-the-counter derivatives—were hidden from view, without the protections we had constructed to prevent financial meltdowns. We had a 21st-century financial system with 19th-century safeguards."

=== Significance of the parallel banking system ===
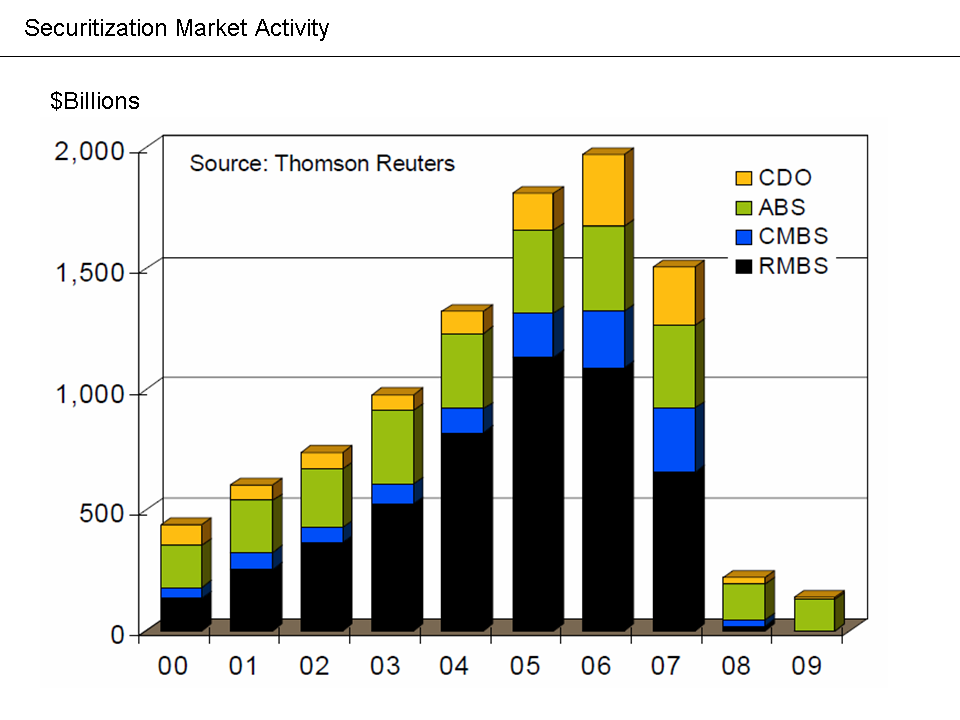
Securitization markets were impaired during the crisis

In a June 2008 speech, U.S. Treasury Secretary Timothy Geithner, then President and CEO of the NY Federal Reserve Bank, placed significant blame for the freezing of credit markets on a "run" on the entities in the "parallel" banking system, also called the shadow banking system. These entities became critical to the credit markets underpinning the financial system, but were not subject to the same regulatory controls. Further, these entities were vulnerable because they borrowed short-term in liquid markets to purchase long-term, illiquid and risky assets.

This meant that disruptions in credit markets would make them subject to rapid deleveraging, selling their long-term assets at depressed prices. He described the significance of these entities: "In early 2007, asset-backed commercial paper conduits, in structured investment vehicles, in auction-rate preferred securities, tender option bonds and variable rate demand notes, had a combined asset size of roughly $2.2 trillion. Assets financed overnight in triparty repo grew to $2.5 trillion. Assets held in hedge funds grew to roughly $1.8 trillion. The combined balance sheets of the then five major investment banks totaled $4 trillion. In comparison, the total assets of the top five bank holding companies in the United States at that point were just over $6 trillion, and total assets of the entire banking system were about $10 trillion." He stated that the "combined effect of these factors was a financial system vulnerable to self-reinforcing asset price and credit cycles."

=== Run on the shadow banking system ===
Economist Paul Krugman described the run on the shadow banking system as the "core of what happened" to cause the crisis. "As the shadow banking system expanded to rival or even surpass conventional banking in importance, politicians and government officials should have realized that they were re-creating the kind of financial vulnerability that made the Great Depression possible—and they should have responded by extending regulations and the financial safety net to cover these new institutions. Influential figures should have proclaimed a simple rule: anything that does what a bank does, anything that has to be rescued in crises the way banks are, should be regulated like a bank." He referred to this lack of controls as "malign neglect." Some researchers have suggested that competition between GSEs and the shadow banking system led to a deterioration in underwriting standards.

For example, investment bank Bear Stearns was required to replenish much of its funding in overnight markets, making the firm vulnerable to credit market disruptions. When concerns arose regarding its financial strength, its ability to secure funds in these short-term markets was compromised, leading to the equivalent of a bank run. Over four days, its available cash declined from $18 billion to $3 billion as investors pulled funding from the firm. It collapsed and was sold at a fire-sale price to bank JP Morgan Chase March 16, 2008.

American homeowners, consumers, and corporations owed roughly $25 trillion during 2008. American banks retained about $8 trillion of that total directly as traditional mortgage loans. Bondholders and other traditional lenders provided another $7 trillion. The remaining $10 trillion came from the securitization markets, meaning the parallel banking system. The securitization markets started to close down in the spring of 2007 and nearly shut-down in the fall of 2008. More than a third of the private credit markets thus became unavailable as a source of funds. In February 2009, Ben Bernanke stated that securitization markets remained effectively shut, with the exception of conforming mortgages, which could be sold to Fannie Mae and Freddie Mac.

The Economist reported in March 2010: "Bear Stearns and Lehman Brothers were non-banks that were crippled by a silent run among panicky overnight "repo" lenders, many of them money market funds uncertain about the quality of securitized collateral they were holding. Mass redemptions from these funds after Lehman's failure froze short-term funding for big firms."

== Fannie Mae and Freddie Mac ==
Fannie Mae and Freddie Mac (also called FNMA and FHLMC) are government sponsored enterprises (GSEs) that purchase mortgages, buy and sell mortgage-backed securities (MBS), and guarantee a large fraction of the mortgages in the U.S.

=== Financial Crisis Inquiry Commission ===
The Financial Crisis Inquiry Commission (FCIC) reported in 2011 that Fannie Mae & Freddie Mac "contributed to the crisis, but were not a primary cause." The FCIC reported that:

- "all but two of the dozens of current and former Fannie Mae employees and regulators interviewed on the subject told the FCIC that reaching the goals was not the primary driver of the GSEs' purchases of riskier mortgages"; that
- until 2005, the homeownership goals for GSEs — 50% of mortgage purchases were to be made up of low- or moderate-income families — were so unchallenging as to be satisfied by the "normal course of business", although in 2005 the goal was raised and reached 55% in 2007;
- most Alt-A loans — which are included in riskier mortgages for which the GSEs are criticized for buying — "were high-income-oriented", purchased to increase profits, not with an eye towards meeting low- and moderate-income homeownership goals; that
- much of the GSEs' efforts to boost homeownership were marketing and promotional efforts — housing fairs, and outreach programs — that had nothing to do with reducing or loosening lending standards; that
- the law mandating lending to increase homeownership allowed both Fannie and Freddie "to fall short of meeting housing goals that were `infeasible` or that would affect the companies' safety and soundness", and that the GSE's availed themselves of that loophole when they felt the need to; and that
- in the end, examination of the loans found only a small number (for example 4% of all loans purchased by Freddie between 2005 and 2008) were purchased "specifically because they contributed to the [homeownership] goals".

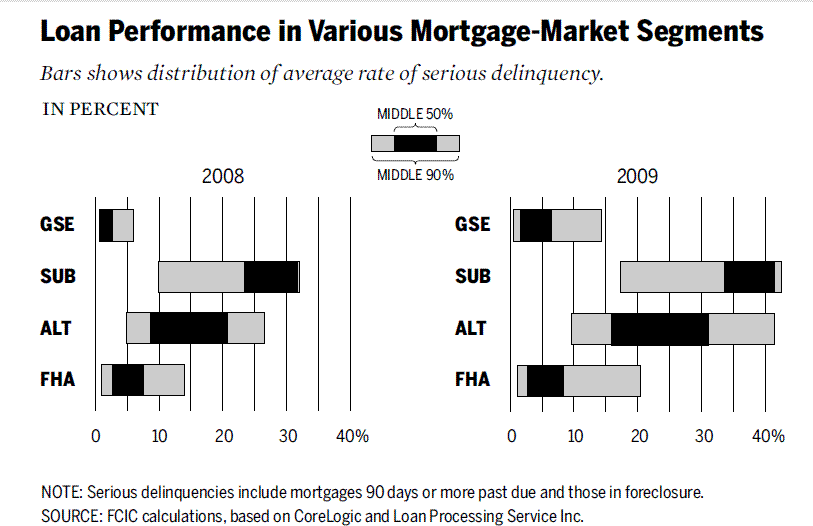
* GSE refers to loans either purchased or guaranteed by government sponsored entities Fannie Mae (FNMA) and Freddie Mac (FHLMC) *SUB refers to loans that were sold into private label securities labeled subprime by issuers *ALT refers to loans sold into private label Alt-a securitizations (not as risky as subprime loans) *FHA refers to loans guaranteed by the Federal Housing Administration or Veterans Administration (source: Final Report of the National Commission on the Causes of the Financial and Economic Crisis in the United States, p. 218, figure 11.3)

The Commission found GSE loans had a delinquency rate of 6.2% in 2008 versus 28.3% for non-GSE or private label loans. Taking the roughly 25 million mortgages outstanding at the end of each year from 2006 through 2009 and subdividing them into 500+ subgroups according to characteristics like credit scores, down payment and mortgage size, mortgage purchaser/guaranteer, etc., the Commission found the average rate of serious delinquencies much lower among loans purchased or guaranteed by government sponsored organizations such as the FHA, Fannie Mae and Freddie Mac, than among non-prime loans sold into "private label" securitization. (see "Loan Performance in Various Mortgage-Market Segments" chart)

The Commission found that GSE mortgage securities

essentially maintained their value throughout the crisis and did not contribute to the significant financial firm losses that were central to the financial crisis. The GSEs participated in the expansion of subprime and other risky mortgages, but they followed rather than led Wall Street and other lenders

into subprime lending. Writing in January 2011, three of the four Republicans on the FCIC Commission though dissenting from other conclusions of the majority, found that U.S. housing policy was, at the most, only one of the causes of the crisis. The three wrote:

"Credit spreads declined not just for housing, but also for other asset classes like commercial real estate. This tells us to look to the credit bubble as an essential cause of the U.S. housing bubble. It also tells us that problems with U.S. housing policy or markets do not by themselves explain the U.S. housing bubble."

==== Wallison's Dissent ====
In his lone dissent to the majority and minority opinions of the FCIC, Commissioner Peter J. Wallison of the American Enterprise Institute (AEI) blamed U.S. housing policy, including the actions of Fannie & Freddie, primarily for the crisis, writing: "When the bubble began to deflate in mid-2007, the low quality and high risk loans engendered by government policies failed in unprecedented numbers. The effect of these defaults was exacerbated by the fact that few if any investors—including housing market analysts—understood at the time that Fannie Mae and Freddie Mac had been acquiring large numbers of subprime and other high risk loans in order to meet HUD’s affordable housing goals." His dissent relied heavily on the research of fellow AEI member Edward Pinto, the former Chief Credit Officer of Fannie Mae. Pinto estimated that by early 2008 there were 27 million higher-risk, "non-traditional" mortgages (defined as subprime and Alt-A) outstanding valued at $4.6 trillion. Of these, Fannie & Freddie held or guaranteed 12 million mortgages valued at $1.8 trillion. Government entities held or guaranteed 19.2 million or $2.7 trillion of such mortgages total. As of January 2008, the total value of U.S. mortgage debt outstanding was $10.7 trillion.

Wallsion publicized his dissent and responded to critics in a number of articles and op-ed pieces, and New York Times Columnist Joe Nocera accuses him of "almost single-handedly" creating "the myth that Fannie Mae and Freddie Mac caused the financial crisis".

=== Other debate about the role of Fannie and Freddie in creating the financial crisis ===
==== Critics of Fannie Mae and Freddie Mac ====
Critics contend that Fannie Mae and Freddie Mac affected lending standards in many ways - ways that often had nothing to do with their direct loan purchases:

===== Aggressive promotion of easy automated underwriting standards =====
In 1995 Fannie and Freddie introduced automated underwriting systems, designed to speed-up the underwriting process. These systems, which soon set underwriting standards for most of the industry (whether or not the loans were purchased by the GSEs) greatly relaxed the underwriting approval process. An independent study of about 1000 loans found that the same loans were 65 percent more likely to be approved by the automated processes versus the traditional processes. The GSE were aggressive in promoting the new, liberalized systems, and even required lenders to use them. In a paper written in January 2004, OFHEO described the process: "Once Fannie Mae and Freddie Mac began to use scoring and automated underwriting in their internal business operations, it was not long before each Enterprise required the single-family lenders with which it does business to use such tools. The Enterprises did so by including the use of those technologies in the conforming guidelines for their seller/servicers."

===== Aggressive promotion of easy collateral appraisal systems =====
In the mid-1990s Fannie and Freddie also promoted Automated Valuation Systems (AVMs). Before long the two GSEs decided that, in many cases, on-site physical inspections were not needed. Rather, the AVM, which relied mostly on comparable sales data, would suffice. Some analysts believe that the use of AVMs, especially for properties in distressed neighborhoods, led to overvaluation of the collateral backing mortgage loans.

===== Promotion of thousands of small mortgage brokers =====
In 2001 some mainstream banks told the Wall Street Journal that Fannie and Freddie were promoting small, thinly capitalized mortgage brokers over regulated community banks, by providing these brokers with automated underwriting systems. The Wall Street Journal reported that the underwriting software was "made available to thousands of mortgage brokers" and made these "brokers and other small players a threat to larger banks." The theory was that "brokers armed with automated-underwriting software" could sell loans directly to F&F, thereby "cutting banks out of the loan-making business." At the peak of the housing boom there were about 75,000 small mortgage brokers across the United States, and it is believed that many of these accounted for the slip-shod and predatory loan practices that led to the subprime mortgage crisis.

===== Creation of the low-quality loan products offered by private lenders =====
Many of the loan products sold by mortgage lenders, and criticized for their weak standards, were designed by Fannie or Freddie. For example, the "Affordable Gold 100" line of loans, designed by Freddie, required no down payment and no closing costs from the borrower. The closing costs could come from "a variety of sources, including a grant from a qualified institution, gift from a relative or an unsecured loan."

===== Close relationship to loan aggregators =====
Countrywide, a company reported to have financed 20 percent of all United States mortgages in 2006, had a close business relationship with Fannie Mae. This relationship is described in Chain of Blame by Muolo and Padilla: "Over the next 15 years [starting in 1991] Countrywide and Fannie Mae – Mozilo and Johnson and then Mozilo and Franklin Raines, Johnson's successor – would be linked at the hip." "Depending on the year, up to 30 percent of Fannie's loans came from Countrywide, and Fannie was so grateful that it rewarded Countrywide with sweetheart purchase terms – better than those offered to real (solid and reputable) banks."

===== False reporting of subprime purchases =====
Estimates of subprime loan purchases by Fannie and Freddie have ranged from zero to trillions of dollars. For example, in 2008 Economist Paul Krugman erroneously claimed that Fannie and Freddie "didn't do any subprime lending, because they can't; the definition of a subprime loan is precisely a loan that doesn't meet the requirement, imposed by law, that Fannie and Freddie buy only mortgages issued to borrowers who made substantial down payments and carefully documented their income."

Economist Russell Roberts cited a June 2008 Washington Post article which stated that "[f]rom 2004 to 2006, the two [GSEs] purchased $434 billion in securities backed by subprime loans, creating a market for more such lending." Furthermore, a 2004 HUD report admitted that while trading securities that were backed by subprime mortgages was something that the GSEs officially disavowed, they nevertheless participated in the market. Both Fannie and Freddie reported some of their subprime purchases in their annual reports for 2004, 2005, 2006, and 2007. However, the full extent of GSE subprime purchases was not known until after the 2008 financial crisis. In December 2011, the U.S. Securities and Exchange Commission charged 6 ex-executives of Fannie and Freddie with Securities Fraud, and the SEC alleged that their companies held, in reality, over $2 trillion in subprime loans as of June 2008 (a month before Krugman made his exonerating statement).

===== Estimates of the subprime loan and securities purchases of Fannie and Freddie =====
Critics claim that the amount of subprime loans reported by the two GSEs are wildly understated. In an early estimate of GSE subprime purchases, Peter J. Wallison of the American Enterprise Institute and Calomiris estimated that the two GSEs held about $1 trillion of subprime as of August 2008. A subsequent estimate by Edward Pinto, a former Fannie Mae Executive, was about $1.8 trillion, spread among 12 million mortgages. That would be, by number, nearly half of all subprime loans outstanding in the United States. The highest estimate was produced by Wallison and Edward Pinto, based on amounts reported by the Securities and Exchange Commission in conjunction with its securities fraud case against former executives of Fannie and Freddie. Using the SEC information, Wallison and Pinto estimated that the two GSEs held over $2 trillion in substandard loans in 2008.

The discrepancies can be attributed to the estimate sources and methods. The lowest estimate (Krugman's) is simply based on what is legally allowable, without regard to what was actually done. Other low estimates are simply based on the amounts reported by Fannie and Freddie in their financial statements and other reporting. As noted by Alan Greenspan, the subprime reporting by the GSEs was understated, and this fact was not widely known until 2009: "The enormous size of purchases by the GSEs [Fannie and Freddie] in 2003–2004 was not revealed until Fannie Mae in September 2009 reclassified a large part of its securities portfolio of prime mortgages as subprime."

The estimates of Wallison, Calomiris, and Pinto are based upon analysis of the specific characteristics of the loans. For example, Wallison and Calomiris used 5 factors which, they believe, indicate subprime lending. Those factors are negative loan amortization, interest-only payments, down-payments under 10 percent, low-documentation, and low FICO (credit) scores.

===== Cheerleading for subprime =====
When Fannie or Freddie bought subprime loans they were taking a chance because, as noted by Paul Krugman, "a subprime loan is precisely a loan that doesn't meet the requirement, imposed by law, that Fannie and Freddie buy only mortgages issued to borrowers who made substantial down payments and carefully documented their income." As noted, the SEC has alleged that Fannie and Freddie both ignored the law with regard to the purchase of subprime loans. However, some loans were so clearly lacking in quality that Fannie and Freddie wouldn't take a chance on buying them. Nevertheless, the two GSEs promoted the subprime loans that they could not buy. For example: "In 1997, Matt Miller, a Director of Single-Family Affordable Lending at Freddie Mac, addressed private lenders at an Affordable Housing Symposium. He said that Freddie could usually find a way to buy and securitize their affordable housing loans 'through the use of Loan Prospector research and creative credit enhancements … .' Then, Mr. Miller added: 'But what can you do if after all this analysis the product you are holding is not up to the standards of the conventional secondary market?' Matt Miller had a solution: Freddie would work with "several firms" in an effort to find buyers for these [subprime] loans." .

The GSEs had a pioneering role in expanding the use of subprime loans: In 1999, Franklin Raines first put Fannie Mae into subprimes, following up on earlier Fannie Mae efforts in the 1990s, which reduced mortgage down payment requirements. At this time, subprimes represented a tiny fraction of the overall mortgage market. In 2003, after the use of subprimes had been greatly expanded, and numerous private lenders had begun issuing subprime loans as a competitive response to Fannie and Freddie, the GSE's still controlled nearly 50% of all subprime lending. From 2003 forward, private lenders increased their share of subprime lending, and later issued many of the riskiest loans. However, attempts to defend Fannie Mae and Freddie Mac for their role in the crisis, by citing their declining market share in subprimes after 2003, ignore the fact that the GSE's had largely created this market, and even worked closely with some of the worst private lending offenders, such as Countrywide. In 2005, one out of every four loans purchased by Fannie Mae came from Countrywide. Fannie Mae and Freddie Mac essentially paved the subprime highway, down which many others later followed.

==== Defenders of Fannie Mae and Freddie Mac ====
Economist Paul Krugman and attorney David Min have argued that Fannie Mae, Freddie Mac, and the Community Reinvestment Act (CRA) could not have been primary causes of the bubble/bust in residential real estate because there was a bubble of similar magnitude in commercial real estate in America — the market for hotels, shopping malls and office parks scarcely affected by affordable housing policies. Their assumption, implicitly, is that the financial crisis was caused by the bursting of a real estate "bubble."

“Members of the Right tried to blame the seeming market failures on government; in their mind the government effort to push people with low incomes into home ownership was the source of the problem. Widespread as this belief has become in conservative circles, virtually all serious attempts to evaluate the evidence have concluded that there is little merit in this view.”

— Joseph Stiglitz

Countering Krugman's analysis, Peter Wallison argues that the crisis was caused by the bursting of a real estate bubble that was supported largely by low or no-down-payment loans, which was uniquely the case for U.S. residential housing loans. Also, after researching the default of commercial loans during the financial crisis, Xudong An and Anthony B. Sanders reported (in December 2010): "We find limited evidence that substantial deterioration in CMBS [commercial mortgage-backed securities] loan underwriting occurred prior to the crisis." Other analysts support the contention that the crisis in commercial real estate and related lending took place after the crisis in residential real estate. Business journalist Kimberly Amadeo reports: "The first signs of decline in residential real estate occurred in 2006. Three years later, commercial real estate started feeling the effects. Denice A. Gierach, a real estate attorney and CPA, wrote:

...most of the commercial real estate loans were good loans destroyed by a really bad economy. In other words, the borrowers did not cause the loans to go bad, it was the economy.

In their book on the crisis, journalists McLean and Nocera argue that the GSEs (Fannie and Freddie) followed rather than led the private sector into subprime lending.

"In 2003, Fannie Mae's estimated market share for bonds backed by single-family housing was 45%. Just one year later, it dropped to 23.5%. As a 2005 internal presentation at Fannie Mae noted, with some alarm, `Private label volume surpassed Fannie Mae volume for the first time.` ... There was no question about why this was happening: the subprime mortgage originators were starting to dominate the market. They didn't need Fannie and Freddie to guarantee their loans ... As Fannie's market share dropped, the company's investors grew restless ...
Citigroup had been hired to look at what Citi called `strategic alternatives to maximize long term ... shareholder value` [at Fannie Mae]. Among its key recommendations for increasing ... market capitalization: ... begin guaranteeing `non-conforming residential mortgages`"

"Non-conforming" loans meaning not conforming to prime lending standards.

In a 2008 article on Fannie Mae, the New York Times describes the company as responding to pressure rather than setting the pace in lending. By 2004, "competitors were snatching lucrative parts of its business. Congress was demanding that [it] help steer more loans to low-income borrowers. Lenders were threatening to sell directly to Wall Street unless Fannie bought a bigger chunk of their riskiest loans"

Federal Reserve data found more than 84% of the subprime mortgages in 2006 coming from private-label institutions rather than Fannie and Freddie, and the share of subprime loans insured by Fannie Mae and Freddie Mac decreasing as the bubble got bigger (from a high of insuring 48% to insuring 24% of all subprime loans in 2006). According to economists Jeff Madrick and Frank Partnoy, unlike Wall Street, the GSEs "never bought the far riskier collateralized debt obligations (CDOs) that were also rated triple-A and were the main source of the financial crisis." A 2011 study by the Fed using statistical comparisons of geographic regions which were and were not subject to GSE regulations, found "little evidence" that GSEs played a significant role in the subprime crisis.

Another argument against Wallison's thesis is that the numbers for subprime mortgages provided for him by Pinto are inflated and "don’t hold up". Krugman cited the work of economist Mike Konczal: "As Konczal says, all of this stuff relies on a form of three-card monte: you talk about “subprime and other high-risk” loans, lumping subprime with other loans that are not, it turns out, anywhere near as risky as actual subprime; then use this essentially fake aggregate to make it seem as if Fannie/Freddie were actually at the core of the problem." In Pinto's analysis, "non-traditional mortgages" include Alt-A mortgages, which are not used by low and moderate income borrowers and have nothing to do with meeting affordable housing goals.

According to Journalist McLean, "the theory that the GSEs are to blame for the crisis" is a "canard", that "has been thoroughly discredited, again and again." The Commission met with Pinto to analyze his figures and, according to McLean, "Pinto’s numbers don’t hold up".

The Government Accountability Office estimated a far smaller number for subprime loans outstanding than Pinto. Pinto stated that, at the time the market collapsed, half of all U.S. mortgages — 27 million loans — were subprime. The GAO estimated (in 2010) that only 4.59 million such loans were outstanding by the end of 2009, and that from 2000 to 2007 only 14.5 million total nonprime loans were originated.

Pinto's data, included in Wallison's FCIC dissenting report estimated Fannie and Freddie purchased $1.8 trillion in subprime mortgages, spread among 12 million mortgages. However, according to journalist Joe Nocera, Pinto's mortgage numbers are "inflated", by classifying "just about anything that is not a 30-year-fixed mortgage as `subprime.`"

The judgments made above (by Konczal, Krugman, McLean, the GAO, and the Federal Reserve) were made prior to the SEC charging, in December 2011, Fannie Mae and Freddie Mac executives with securities fraud. Significantly, the SEC alleged (and still maintains) that Fannie Mae and Freddie Mac reported as subprime and substandard less than 10 percent of their actual subprime and substandard loans. In other words, the substandard loans held in the GSE portfolios may have been 10 times greater than originally reported. According to Wallison, that would make the SEC's estimate of GSE substandard loans higher than Edward Pinto's estimate.

According to David Min, a critic of Wallison at the Center for American Progress,

as of the second quarter of 2010, the delinquency rate on all Fannie and Freddie guaranteed loans was 5.9 percent. By contrast, the national average was 9.11 percent. The Fannie and Freddie Alt-A default rate is similarly much lower than the national default rate. The only possible explanation for this is that many of the loans being characterized by the S.E.C. and Wallison/Pinto as “subprime” are not, in fact, true subprime mortgages.

Still another criticism of Wallison is that insofar as Fannie and Freddie contributed to the crisis, its own profit seeking and not government mandates for expanded homeownership are the cause. In December 2011, after the Securities and Exchange Commission charged 6 ex-executives of Fannie and Freddie with Securities Fraud, Wallison stated, as did the SEC, that the full extent of GSE subprime purchases was hidden during the crisis. Based upon the SEC charges, Wallison estimated that Fannie and Freddie held, in reality, over $2 trillion in subprime loans as of June 2008. However, journalist Joe Nocera contends that the "SEC complaint makes almost no mention of affordable housing mandates" and instead alleges the executives bought the subprime mortgages (in the words of Nocera) "belatedly ... to reclaim lost market share, and thus maximize their bonuses." According to Jeff Madrick and Frank Partnoy, what put Fannie and Freddie into conservatorship in September 2008 "had little to do with pursuit of the original goals of `affordable lending`. The GSEs were far more concerned to maximize their profits than to meet these goals; they were borrowing at low rates to buy high-paying mortgage securities once their accounting irregularities were behind them. ... Most disturbing about the GSEs, they refused to maintain adequate capital as a cushion against losses, despite demands from their own regulators that they do so."

Nocera's contention notwithstanding, at least one executive at Fannie Mae had an entirely different viewpoint, stating in an interview:

Everybody understood that we were now buying loans that we would have previously rejected, and that the models were telling us that we were charging way too little, but our mandate was to stay relevant and to serve low-income borrowers. So that's what we did." Fannie and Freddie were both under political pressure to expand purchases of higher-risk affordable housing mortgage types, and under significant competitive pressure from large investment banks and mortgage lenders.

Wallison has cited New York Times columnist Gretchen Morgenson and her book Reckless Endangerment as demonstrating that "the Democratic political operative" Jim Johnson turned Fannie Mae "into a political machine that created and exploited the government housing policies that were central to the financial crisis and led the way for Wall Street". However, in a review of Morgenson's book, two economist critics of Wallison (Jeff Madrick and Frank Partnoy) point out Morgenson does not defend Wall Street as misled by Fannie, but states “of all the partners in the homeownership push, no industry contributed more to the corruption of the lending process than Wall Street.”

=== Federal takeover of Fannie Mae and Freddie Mac ===
By 2008, the GSE owned, either directly or through mortgage pools they sponsored, $5.1 trillion in residential mortgages, about half the amount outstanding. The GSE have always been highly leveraged, their net worth as of 30 June 2008 being a mere US$114 billion. When concerns arose regarding the ability of the GSE to make good on their nearly $5 trillion in guarantee and other obligations in September 2008, the U.S. government was forced to place the companies into a conservatorship, effectively nationalizing them at the taxpayers expense. Paul Krugman noted that an implicit guarantee of government support meant that "profits are privatized but losses are socialized," meaning that investors and management profited during the boom-period while taxpayers would take on the losses during a bailout.

Announcing the conservatorship on 7 September 2008, GSE regulator Jim Lockhart stated: "To promote stability in the secondary mortgage market and lower the cost of funding, the GSEs will modestly increase their MBS portfolios through the end of 2009. Then, to address systemic risk, in 2010 their portfolios will begin to be gradually reduced at the rate of 10 percent per year, largely through natural run off, eventually stabilizing at a lower, less risky size."

According to Jeff Madrick and Frank Partnoy, the GSEs ended up in conservatorship because of the sharpness of the drop in housing prices, and despite the fact that they "never took nearly the risks that the private market took." Jason Thomas and Robert Van Order argue that the downfall of the GSEs “was quick, primarily due to mortgages originated in 2006 and 2007. It … was mostly associated with purchases of risky-but-not-subprime mortgages and insufficient capital to cover the decline in property values.” In their paper on the GSEs they did "not find evidence that their crash was due much to government housing policy or that they had an essential role in the development of the subprime mortgage - backed securities market".

== Community Reinvestment Act ==
The CRA was originally enacted under President Jimmy Carter in 1977. The Act was set in place to encourage banks to halt the practice of lending discrimination. There is debate among economists regarding the effect of the CRA, with detractors claiming it encourages lending to uncreditworthy consumers and defenders claiming a thirty-year history of lending without increased risk.

=== Conclusions of the Financial Crisis Inquiry Commission ===
The Financial Crisis Inquiry Commission (majority report) concluded in January 2011 that: "...the CRA was not a significant factor in subprime lending or the crisis. Many subprime lenders were not subject to the CRA. Research indicates only 6% of high-cost loans—a proxy for subprime loans—had any connection to the law. Loans made by CRA-regulated lenders in the neighborhoods in which they were required to lend were half as likely to default as similar loans made in the same neighborhoods by independent mortgage originators not subject to the law."

The three Republican authors of a dissenting report to the FCIC majority opinion wrote in January 2011: "Neither the Community Reinvestment Act nor removal of the Glass-Steagall firewall was a significant cause. The crisis can be explained without resorting to these factors." The three authors further explained: "Credit spreads declined not just for housing, but also for other asset classes like commercial real estate. This tells us to look to the credit bubble as an essential cause of the U.S. housing bubble. It also tells us that problems with U.S. housing policy or markets do not by themselves explain the U.S. housing bubble."

=== Debate about the role of CRA in the crisis ===
Detractors assert that the early years of the CRA were relatively innocuous; however, amendments to CRA, made in the mid-1990s, increased the amount of home loans to unqualified low-income borrowers and, for the first time, allowed the securitization of CRA-regulated loans containing subprime mortgages. In the view of some critics, the weakened lending standards of CRA and other affordable housing programs, coupled with the Federal Reserve's low interest-rate policies after 2001, was a major cause of the 2008 financial crisis.

CPA Joseph Fried wrote that there is a paucity of CRA loan performance data, based on a response by only 34 of 500 banks surveyed. Nevertheless, estimates have been attempted. Edward Pinto, former Chief Credit Officer of Fannie Mae (1987–89) and Fellow at the American Enterprise Institute, estimated that, at June 30, 2008, there were $1.56 trillion of outstanding CRA loans (or the equivalent). Of this amount, about $940 billion (about 6.7 million loans) was, according to Pinto, subprime.

Economist Paul Krugman notes the subprime boom "was overwhelmingly driven" by loan originators who were not subject to the Community Reinvestment Act. One study, by a legal firm which counsels financial services entities on Community Reinvestment Act compliance, found that CRA-covered institutions were less likely to make subprime loans (only 20–25% of all subprime loans), and when they did the interest rates were lower. The banks were half as likely to resell the loans to other parties.

Federal Reserve Governor Randall Kroszner and Federal Deposit Insurance Corporation Chairman Sheila Bair have stated that the CRA was not to blame for the crisis. In a 2008 speech delivered to The New America Foundation conference, Bair remarked, "Let me ask you: where in the CRA does it say: make loans to people who can't afford to repay? No-where! And the fact is, the lending practices that are causing problems today were driven by a desire for market share and revenue growth ... pure and simple." Bair is literally correct: The CRA doesn't tell banks to make loans to those who can't pay. However, research suggests that many banks felt heavily pressured. For example, Bostic and Robinson found that lenders seem to view CRA agreements "as a form of insurance against the potentially large and unknown costs..." of lending violations.

Federal Reserve Governor Randall Kroszner says the CRA is not to blame for the subprime mess, "First, only a small portion of subprime mortgage originations are related to the CRA. Second, CRA-related loans appear to perform comparably to other types of subprime loans. Taken together… we believe that the available evidence runs counter to the contention that the CRA contributed in any substantive way to the current mortgage crisis," Kroszner said: "Only 6%of all the higher-priced loans were extended by CRA-covered lenders to lower-income borrowers or neighborhoods in their CRA assessment areas, the local geographies that are the primary focus for CRA evaluation purposes."

According to American Enterprise Institute fellow Edward Pinto, Bank of America reported in 2008 that its CRA portfolio, which constituted 7% of its owned residential mortgages, was responsible for 29 percent of its losses. He also charged that "approximately 50 percent of CRA loans for single-family residences ... [had] characteristics that indicated high credit risk," yet, per the standards used by the various government agencies to evaluate CRA performance at the time, were not counted as "subprime" because borrower credit worthiness was not considered. However, economist Paul Krugman argues that Pinto's category of "other high-risk mortgages" incorrectly includes loans that were not high-risk, that instead were like traditional conforming mortgages. Additionally, another CRA critic concedes that "some of this CRA subprime lending might have taken place, even in the absence of CRA. For that reason, the direct impact of CRA on the volume of subprime lending is not certain."

James Kourlas points out that ”industry participants … were convinced that they could handle the new lending standards and make a profit. They were convinced that they could safely fund the massive expansion of housing credit. That they were wrong is not proof in and of itself that they were willing to sacrifice profits for altruistic ideals. That government started the ball rolling doesn’t fully explain why the industry took the ball and ran with it.”

The CRA was revived in the 1990s, during the merger fever among banks. The fragmented banking system was a legacy of state-level anti-branching laws. Without branches and national diversification, banks were subject to local economic downturns. In the aftermath of the Savings and loan crisis a decade of mergers consolidated the banking industry. One of the criteria for government approval for a merger was “good citizenship” exhibited by lending to under-serviced markets.

During the Clinton administration, the CRA was reinvigorated and used to control mergers. President Clinton said the CRA “was pretty well moribund until we took office. Over 95 percent of the community investment … made in the 22 years of that law have been made in the six and a half years that I’ve been in office.” The CRA became an important tool in Clinton's “third way” as an alternative to both laissez-faire and government transfer payments to directly construct housing.

CRA ratings, however, and not CRA loans, were the main tools of altering banking practices. A poor rating prevented mergers. Community activist groups became an important part of the merger process. Their support was crucial to most mergers and in return the banks supported their organizations. By 2000 banks gave $9.5 billion of support to activist groups and in return these groups testified in favor of select mergers. The creation by mergers of the mega-bank WaMu in 1999 came with a ten-year CRA $120 billion agreement to fund housing activist efforts. In return CRA activists back the merger of one of “worst-run banks and among the largest and earliest banks to fail in the 2007–09 subprime crisis.”

Banks that refused to abandon traditional credit practices remained small. By controlling mergers, CRA ratings created “believer banks” that not only originated loans labeled CRA-loans but extended easy credit across the board. By controlling the merger process the government was able to breed easy-credit banks by a process of artificial selection.

Steven D. Gjerstad and Vernon L. Smith, reviewing the research on the role of the CRA, find that CRA loans were not significant in the crisis but CRA scoring (bank ratings) played an important role. They conclude "the CRA is neither absolved of playing a role in the crisis nor faulted as a root cause." It justified easy credit to those of modest means and indirectly affected all lending to the borrowers it targeted. It was, however, part of an emerging consensus among lenders, government and the public for easy credit.

== Government "affordable homeownership" policies ==
=== Overview ===
The Financial Crisis Inquiry Commission (FCIC), Federal Reserve economists, business journalists Bethany McLean and Joe Nocera, and several academic researchers have argued that government affordable housing policies were not the major cause of the financial crisis. They also argue that Community Reinvestment Act loans outperformed other "subprime" mortgages, and GSE mortgages performed better than private label securitizations.

According to the Financial Crisis Inquiry Commission, "based on the evidence and interviews with dozens of individuals involved" in HUD's (Department of Housing and Urban Development) "affordable housing goals" for the GSEs, "we determined these goals only contributed marginally to Fannie’s and Freddie’s participation in "risky mortgages".

Economists Paul Krugman and David Min point out that the simultaneous growth of the residential, commercial real estate—and also consumer credit—pricing bubbles in the US and general financial crisis outside it, undermines the case that Fannie Mae, Freddie Mac, CRA, or predatory lending were primary causes of the crisis, since affordable housing policies did not effect either US commercial real estate or non-US real estate.

[T]here was no federal act driving banks to lend money for office parks and shopping malls; Fannie and Freddie weren’t in the CRE [commercial real estate] loan business; yet 55 percent — 55 percent! — of commercial mortgages that will come due before 2014 are underwater.

Writing in January 2011, three of the four Republicans on the FCIC Commission also agreed that the concurrent commercial real estate boom showed that U.S. housing policies were not the sole cause of the real estate bubble:

"Credit spreads declined not just for housing, but also for other asset classes like commercial real estate. This tells us to look to the credit bubble as an essential cause of the U.S. housing bubble. It also tells us that problems with U.S. housing policy or markets do not by themselves explain the U.S. housing bubble."

Countering the analysis of Krugman and members of the FCIC, Peter Wallison argues that the crisis was caused by the bursting of a real estate bubble that was supported largely by low or no-down-payment loans, which was uniquely the case for U.S. residential housing loans.

Krugman's analysis is also challenged by other analysis. After researching the default of commercial loans during the financial crisis, Xudong An and Anthony B. Sanders reported (in December 2010): "We find limited evidence that substantial deterioration in CMBS [commercial mortgage-backed securities] loan underwriting occurred prior to the crisis." Other analysts support the contention that the crisis in commercial real estate and related lending took place after the crisis in residential real estate. Business journalist Kimberly Amadeo reports: "The first signs of decline in residential real estate occurred in 2006. Three years later, commercial real estate started feeling the effects. Denice A. Gierach, a real estate attorney and CPA, wrote:

...most of the commercial real estate loans were good loans destroyed by a really bad economy. In other words, the borrowers did not cause the loans to go bad, it was the economy.

Critics of U.S. affordable housing policies have cited three aspects of governmental affordable housing policy as having contributed to the financial crisis: the Community Reinvestment Act, HUD-regulated affordable housing mandates imposed upon Fannie Mae and Freddie Mac, and HUD's direct efforts to promote affordable housing through state and local entities. In his 2010 book The Housing Boom and Bust, Thomas Sowell wrote: "Lax lending standards used to meet 'affordable housing' quotas were the key to the American mortgage crisis.".

=== Department of Housing and Urban Development (HUD) ===
==== HUD mandates for affordable housing ====
The Department of Housing and Urban Development (HUD) loosened mortgage restrictions in the mid-1990s so first-time buyers could qualify for loans that they could never get before. In 1995, the GSE began receiving affordable housing credit for purchasing mortgage backed securities which included loans to low income borrowers. This resulted in the agencies purchasing subprime securities.

The Housing and Community Development Act of 1992 established an affordable housing loan purchase mandate for Fannie Mae and Freddie Mac, and that mandate was to be regulated by HUD. Initially, the 1992 legislation required that 30 percent or more of Fannie's and Freddie's loan purchases be related to affordable housing. However, HUD was given the power to set future requirements. In 1995 HUD mandated that 40 percent of Fannie and Freddie's loan purchases would have to support affordable housing. In 1996, HUD directed Freddie and Fannie to provide at least 42% of their mortgage financing to borrowers with income below the median in their area. This target was increased to 50% in 2000 and 52% in 2005. Under the Bush Administration HUD continued to pressure Fannie and Freddie to increase affordable housing purchases – to as high as 56 percent by the year 2008. In addition, HUD required Freddie and Fannie to provide 12% of their portfolio to "special affordable" loans. Those are loans to borrowers with less than 60% of their area's median income. These targets increased over the years, with a 2008 target of 28%.

To satisfy these mandates, Fannie and Freddie announced low-income and minority loan commitments. In 1994 Fannie pledged $1 trillion of such loans, a pledge it fulfilled in 2000. In that year Fannie pledged to buy (from private lenders) an additional $2 trillion in low-income and minority loans, and Freddie matched that commitment with its own $2 trillion pledge. Thus, these government sponsored entities pledged to buy, from the private market, a total of $5 trillion in affordable housing loans.

Until relatively recently, "subprime" was praised by at least some members of the U.S. government. In a 2002 speech in the Housing Bureau for Senior's Conference, Edward Gramlich, a former Governor of the Federal Reserve Board, distinguished predatory lending from subprime lending: "In understanding the problem, it is particularly important to distinguish predatory lending from generally beneficial subprime lending… Subprime lending … refers to entirely appropriate and legal lending to borrowers who do not qualify for prime rates…." Mr. Gramlich also cited the importance of subprime lending to the government's afforable housing efforts: " Much of this increased [affordable housing] lending can be attributed to the development of the subprime mortgage market…."

Joseph Fried, author of "Who Really Drove the Economy Into the Ditch?" believes it was inevitable that the looser lending standards would become widespread: "…it was impossible to loosen underwriting standards for people with marginal credit while maintaining rigorous standards for people with good credit histories. Affordable housing policies led to a degrading of underwriting standards for loans of all sizes."

==== HUD's "National Homeownership Strategy" ====
"The National Homeownership Strategy: Partners in the American Dream", was compiled in 1995 by Henry Cisneros, President Clinton's HUD Secretary. This 100-page document represented the viewpoints of HUD, Fannie Mae, Freddie Mac, leaders of the housing industry, various banks, numerous activist organizations such as ACORN and La Raza, and representatives from several state and local governments." The strategy was not limited to the loan purchases of Fannie and Freddie, or to Community Reinvestment Act loans. "This was a broad, governmental plan for the entire lending industry, comprising '100 proposed action items,' ostensibly designed to 'generate up to 8 million additional homeowners' in America.

As part of the 1995 National Homeownership Strategy, HUD advocated greater involvement of state and local organizations in the promotion of affordable housing. In addition, it promoted the use of low or no-down payment loans and undisclosed second, unsecured loans to the borrower to pay their down payments (if any) and closing costs. This idea manifested itself in “silent second” loans that became extremely popular in several states such as California, and in scores of cities such as San Francisco. Using federal funds and their own funds, these states and cities offered borrowers loans that would defray the cost of the down payment. The loans were called “silent” because the primary lender was not supposed to know about them. A Neighborhood Reinvestment Corporation (affiliated with HUD) publicity sheet explicitly described the desired secrecy: “[The NRC affiliates] hold the second mortgages. Instead of going to the family, the monthly voucher is paid to [the NRC affiliates]. In this way the voucher is “invisible” to the traditional lender and the family (emphasis added).

HUD also praised Fannie and Freddie for their efforts to promote lending flexibility: "In recent years many mortgagees have increased underwriting flexibility. This increased flexibility is due, at least in part to … liberalized affordable housing underwriting criteria established by secondary market investors such as Fannie Mae and Freddie Mac." To illustrate the desirable flexibility the Strategy cited a Connecticut program that "allows for nontraditional employment histories, employment histories with gaps, short-term employment, and frequent job changes."

Criticism of the HUD strategy and the resultant relaxation of standards was criticized by at least one research company years prior to the subprime mortgage crisis. In 2001, the independent research company, Graham Fisher & Company, stated: "While the underlying initiatives of the [strategy] were broad in content, the main theme … was the relaxation of credit standards." Graham Fisher cited these specifics:

- "The requirement that homebuyers make significant down payments was eliminated in the 1990s. The [strategy] urged and approved increasingly larger reductions in requirements. Down payment requirements have dropped to record low levels."
- "Over the past decade Fannie Mae and Freddie Mac have reduced required down payments on loans that they purchase in the secondary market. Those requirements have declined from 10% to 5% to 3% and in the past few months Fannie Mae announced that it would follow Freddie Mac's recent move into the 0% down payment mortgage market."
- "Private mortgage insurance requirements were relaxed."
- New, automated underwriting software, developed by Fannie and Freddie, allows reduced loan documentation and "higher debt to income levels than does traditional underwriting." The underwriting systems were approved "even though they were stress-tested using only a limited number and breadth of economic scenarios."
- The house appraisal process "is being compromised. We have spoken with real estate appraisers, fraud appraisers and national appraisal organizations and have been told, almost unanimously, that the changes in the appraisal process, over the past decade, have jeopardized the soundness of the process and skewed real estate prices."

Government housing policies guaranteed home mortgages and/or promoting low or no down payment have been criticized by economist Henry Hazlitt as "inevitably" meaning "more bad loans than otherwise", wasting taxpayer money, " leading to "an oversupply of houses" bidding up[ the cost of housing. In "the long run, they do not increase national production but encourage malinvestment." These risks were realized as the housing bubble peaked in 2005–2006 and deflated thereafter, contributing to the crisis.

=== Role of the Federal Home Loan Banks ===
The Federal Home Loan Banks (FHLB) are less understood and discussed in the media. The FHLB provides loans to banks that are in turn backed by mortgages. Although they are one step removed from direct mortgage lending, some of the broader policy issues are similar between the FHLB and the other GSEs. According to Bloomberg, the FHLB is the largest U.S. borrower after the federal government. On January 8, 2009, Moody's said that only 4 of the 12 FHLBs may be able to maintain minimum required capital levels and the U.S. government may need to put some of them into conservatorship.

=== Policies of the Clinton Administration ===
As noted, the National Homeownership Strategy, which advocated a general loosening of lending standards, at least with regard to affordable housing, was devised in 1995 by HUD under the Clinton Administration. During the rest of the Clinton Administration HUD set increasingly rigorous affordable housing loan requirements for Fannie and Freddie.

In 1995 the Clinton Administration made changes to the CRA. The changes were extensive and, in the opinion of critics, very destructive. Under the new rules, banks and thrifts were to be evaluated "based on the number and amount of loans issued within their assessment areas, the geographical distribution of those loans, the distribution of loans based on borrower characteristics, the number and amount of community development loans, and the amount of innovation and flexibility they used when approving loans." Some analysts maintain that these new rules pressured banks to make weak loans.

=== Policies of the Bush Administration ===
President Bush advocated the "Ownership society." According to a New York Times article published in 2008, "he pushed hard to expand home ownership, especially among minorities, an initiative that dovetailed with his ambition to expand the Republican tent — and with the business interests of some of his biggest donors. But his housing policies and hands-off approach to regulation encouraged lax lending standards."

There appears to be ample evidence that the Bush administration recognized both the risk of subprimes, and specifically the risks posed by the GSE's who had an implicit guarantee of government backing. For example, in 2003, the Bush administration, recognizing that the current regulators for Fannie and Freddie were inadequate, proposed that a new agency be created to regulate the GSE's. This new agency would have been tasked specifically with setting capital reserve requirements, (removing that authority from Congress), approving new lines business for the GSE's, and most importantly, evaluating the risk in their ballooning portfolios. It was in specific response to this regulatory effort that Barney Frank made his now infamous statement "These two entities -- Fannie Mae and Freddie Mac -- are not facing any kind of financial crisis, the more people exaggerate these problems, the more pressure there is on these companies, the less we will see in terms of affordable housing." Had this new regulatory agency been put in place in 2003, it likely would have uncovered the accounting fraud regarding executive bonuses which was occurring at that time at Fannie Mae. This accounting scandal would later force the resignation of Franklin Raines and others executives. This new agency may also have slowed or stopped the further movement of the entire mortgage industry into subprime loans by exposing the full extent of the risks then taken by Fannie and Freddie, who at this time, controlled nearly half of all subprime loans being issued.

Republican Mike Oxley, the former chairman of the House Financial Services Committee, has pointed out that the House of Representatives did in fact pass a law strengthening regulation of the GSEs (the Federal Housing Finance Reform Act of 2005) but the Bush White House scuttled it. In Oxley's words, "All the hand wringing and bedwetting is going on without remembering how the House stepped up on this. What did we get from the White House? We got a one-finger salute."

Efforts to control GSE were thwarted by intense lobbying by Fannie Mae and Freddie Mac. In April 2005, Secretary of the Treasury John Snow repeated call for GSE reform, saying "Events that have transpired since I testified before this Committee in 2003 reinforce concerns over the systemic risks posed by the GSEs and further highlight the need for real GSE reform to ensure that our housing finance system remains a strong and vibrant source of funding for expanding homeownership opportunities in America … Half-measures will only exacerbate the risks to our financial system." Then Senate Minority Leader Harry Reid rejected legislation saying " we cannot pass legislation that could limit Americans from owning homes and potentially harm our economy in the process." A 2005 Republican effort for comprehensive GSE reform was threatened with filibuster by Senator Chris Dodd (D-CT).

== Role of the Federal Reserve Bank ==
Some economists, such as John Taylor, have asserted that the Fed was responsible, or at least partially responsible, for the United States housing bubble which occurred prior to the 2007 recession. They claim that the Fed kept interest rates too low following the 2001 recession, The housing bubble then led to the credit crunch. Then-Chairman Alan Greenspan disputes this interpretation. He points out that the Fed's control over the long-term interest rates critics have in mind is only indirect. The Fed did raise the short-term interest rate over which it has control (i.e. the federal funds rate), but the long-term interest rate (which usually follows the former) did not increase.

The Federal Reserve's role as a supervisor and regulator has been criticized as being ineffective. Former U.S. Senator Chris Dodd, then-chairman of the United States Senate Committee on Banking, Housing, and Urban Affairs, remarked about the Fed's role in the present economic crisis, "We saw over the last number of years when they took on consumer protection responsibilities and the regulation of bank holding companies, it was an abysmal failure."

According to Bethany McLean and Joe Nocera, Federal Reserve chairman Alan Greenspan's ideologically opposition to government regulation was unmoved either by complaints by grassroots "housing advocates" about the damage to low income communities by predatory mortgage lending in the early 1990s, by the failure of market forces to prevent an early, smaller subprime bubble and bust in the late 1990s, or by appeals by Reserve board governor Edward Gramlich to take a more active role in policing the subprime business.

A related criticism is made by economist Raghuram Rajan (Governor of Reserve Bank of India) who in a book on the financial crisis also argues that the low interest rate policy of the Greenspan Fed both allowed and motivated investors to seek out risk investments offering higher returns, leading to the subprime crisis (as well as the Dot-com bubble). The underlying cause for the American economy's tendency to go "from bubble to bubble", according to Rajan, was the "economy’s weak safety nets” for the unemployed, which made “the US political system ... acutely sensitive to job growth" and prone to unsustainable monetary stimulation.

== Lack of enforcement of laws and regulations ==
Many existing laws and regulations were not effectively enforced prior to the crisis. The SEC was criticized for relaxing investment bank oversight and requiring inadequate risk disclosures by banks. The FDIC allowed banks to shift large amounts of liabilities off-balance sheet, thereby circumventing depository banking capital requirements. The Federal Reserve was criticized for not properly monitoring the quality of mortgage originations. The oligarchy of top financial firms had substantial clout in Washington and promoted an ideology of deregulation and a culture of "industry self-regulation" and the idea that rational business actors avoid taking undue risks. As a result of this culture and the revolving door between Wall Street and Washington, regulators failed to act notwithstanding important warning signs in the form of a series of financial crises, including the savings and loan crisis, the Long-Term Capital Management (LTCM) crisis, each of which necessitated major bailouts, and the derivatives scandals of 1994. These warning signs were ignored as financial deregulating continued, as career SEC investigators were removed, and as finance industry employees were installed in key posts in regulatory agencies. The 1998 bailout of LTCM sent the signal to large "too-big-to-fail" financial firms that they would not have to suffer the consequences of the great risks they take.

Once the crisis hit its critical stage in September 2008, the regulators did not consistently apply remedies available to them, thereby increasing uncertainty. A primary example was allowing the demise of investment bank Lehman Brothers in September 2008, despite the Fed and Treasury Department facilitating a rescue/merger for Bear-Stearns in March 2008 and the Merrill-Lynch merger with Bank of America in September 2008.

Journalist Gretchen Morgenson cites the Financial Crisis Inquiry Commission as noting with disapproval that during the course of the housing boom from 2000 to 2006, the Federal Reserve "referred a grand total of three institutions to prosecutors for possible fair-lending violations in mortgages." The report also quotes a former fraud investigator in the savings-and-loan crisis — William K. Black — lamenting as “terrible” that the “FBI got virtually no assistance from the regulators, the banking regulators and the thrift regulators.”

=== SEC and the net capital rule ===
Leverage ratios of investment banks increased significantly between 2003 and 2007.

During the investment banking crisis in 2008, some analysts blamed the Securities and Exchange Commission (SEC) for its 2004 decision that, they claimed, allowed greater leverage. This leverage enabled investment banks to substantially increase the level of debt they were taking on, fueling the growth in mortgage-backed securities supporting subprime mortgages. Subsequent analysis brings these claims into question.

The critics note that the top five US investment banks each significantly increased their financial leverage during the 2004–2007 time period (see diagram), which increased their vulnerability to the MBS losses. These five institutions reported over $4.1 trillion in debt for fiscal year 2007, a figure roughly 30% the size of the U.S. economy. Three of the five either went bankrupt (Lehman Brothers) or were sold at fire-sale prices to other banks (Bear Stearns and Merrill Lynch) during 2008, creating instability in the global financial system. The remaining two converted to commercial bank models in order to qualify for Troubled Asset Relief Program funds (Goldman Sachs and Morgan Stanley).

While the nominal 8% capital requirements (i.e., 12.5 to 1 leverage ratio) had not been changed by the regulatory authorities, risk-based weighing allowed capital requirements to be reduced for A rated securities and higher. This change, still more stringent than the international Basel accords, was motivated by the goal of keeping American banks competitive with European banks. The reduced capital requirements encouraged banks to hold the less risky A rated securities (according to rating agency standards) rather than the more risky higher-leveraged (i.e. embedded leverage) first-loss tranches. The reduction in capital reserves (and increased explicit leveraged) was accompanied by the reduction of risky lower rated securities that had higher internal leverage.

At least one prominent official within the SEC has rejected the notion that the 2004 SEC changes caused the banks to reduce their capital reserves. In an April 9, 2009 speech, Erik Sirri, then Director of the SEC's Division of Trading and Markets, stated "[t]he Commission did not undo any leverage restrictions in 2004," nor did it intend to make a substantial reduction. Although the SEC rule changes provided flexibility that could be used by banks to minimize their capital balances, Sirri explained that this was not applicable in the case of the 5 banks in the Consolidated Supervised Entity (CSE) program. Those 5 entities used an alternative standard, and had done so for decades. Specifically, they calculated capital requirements as a percentage of customer receivables (and not on the basis of the investments they held). Under the standard in use, the emphasis was on their ability to meet customer-related obligations - not on overall bank financial stability."

Some argue that leverage ratios did not change as dramatically as claimed by critics. Consider, for example, this statement made by the Government Accountability Office (GAO): "In our prior work on Long-Term Capital Management (a hedge fund), we analyzed the assets-to-equity ratios of four of the five broker-dealer holding companies that later became CSEs and found that three had ratios equal to or greater than 28-to-1 at fiscal year-end 1998, which was higher than their ratios at fiscal year-end 2006 before the crisis began."

Erik Sirri, then Director of the SEC's Division of Trading and Markets, concluded: "Since August 2008, commenters in the press and elsewhere have suggested that the 2004 amendments … allowed these firms to increase their debt-to-capital ratios to unsafe levels well-above 12-to1, indeed to 33-to-1…. While this theme has been repeated often in the press and elsewhere, it lacks foundation in fact."

The SEC is also responsible for establishing financial disclosure rules. Critics have argued that disclosure throughout the crisis was ineffective, particularly regarding the health of financial institutions and the valuation of mortgage-backed securities. The SEC is investigating these claims.

== Regulation of derivatives ==
The Commodity Futures Modernization Act of 2000 exempted derivatives from regulation, supervision, trading on established exchanges, and capital reserve requirements for major participants. Concerns that counterparties to derivative deals would be unable to pay their obligations caused pervasive uncertainty during the crisis. Particularly relevant to the crisis are credit default swaps (CDS), a derivative in which Party A pays Party B what is essentially an insurance premium, in exchange for payment should Party C default on its obligations. Warren Buffett famously referred to derivatives as "financial weapons of mass destruction" in early 2003.

Like all swaps and other derivatives, CDS may either be used to hedge risks (specifically, to insure creditors against default) or to profit from speculation. Derivatives usage grew dramatically in the years preceding the crisis. The volume of CDS outstanding increased 100-fold from 1998 to 2008, with estimates of the debt covered by CDS contracts, as of November 2008, ranging from US$33 to $47 trillion. Total over-the-counter (OTC) derivative notional value rose to $683 trillion by June 2008, of which about 8% were CDS.

CDS are lightly regulated. As of 2008, there was no central clearing house to honor CDS in the event a party to a CDS proved unable to perform his obligations under the CDS contract. Required disclosure of CDS-related obligations has been criticized as inadequate. Insurance companies such as American International Group (AIG), MBIA, and Ambac faced ratings downgrades because widespread mortgage defaults increased their potential exposure to CDS losses. These firms had to obtain additional funds (capital) to offset this exposure. AIG's having CDSs insuring $440 billion of MBS resulted in its seeking and obtaining a Federal government bailout.

Like all swaps and other pure wagers, what one party loses under a CDS, the other party gains; CDSs merely reallocate existing wealth [that is, provided that the paying party can perform]. Hence the question is which side of the CDS will have to pay and will it be able to do so. When investment bank Lehman Brothers went bankrupt in September 2008, there was much uncertainty as to which financial firms would be required to honor the CDS contracts on its $600 billion of bonds outstanding.

Economist Joseph Stiglitz summarized how credit default swaps contributed to the systemic meltdown: "With this complicated intertwining of bets of great magnitude, no one could be sure of the financial position of anyone else-or even of one's own position. Not surprisingly, the credit markets froze."

Former President Bill Clinton and former Federal Reserve Chairman Alan Greenspan indicated they did not properly regulate derivatives, including credit default swaps (CDS). A bill (the "Derivatives Markets Transparency and Accountability Act of 2009") (H.R. 977) was unsuccessfully introduced to further regulate the CDS market and establish a clearinghouse. This bill would provide the authority to suspend CDS trading under certain conditions.

Author Michael Lewis wrote that CDS and synthetic CDO derivatives enabled speculators to stack bets on the same mortgage bonds and CDO's. This is analogous to allowing many persons to buy insurance on the same house. Speculators that bought CDS insurance were betting that significant defaults would occur, while the sellers (such as AIG) bet they would not. A theoretically infinite amount could be wagered on the same housing-related securities, provided buyers and sellers of the CDS could be found. He referred to this as a "Doomsday Machine."

NY Insurance Superintendent Eric Dinallo argued in April 2009 for the regulation of CDS and capital requirements sufficient to support financial commitments made by institutions. "Credit default swaps are the rocket fuel that turned the subprime mortgage fire into a conflagration. They were the major cause of AIG's – and by extension the banks' – problems...In sum, if you offer a guarantee – no matter whether you call it a banking deposit, an insurance policy, or a bet – regulation should ensure you have the capital to deliver." He also wrote that banks bought CDS to enable them to reduce the amount of capital they were required to hold against investments, thereby avoiding capital regulations. U.S. Treasury Secretary Timothy Geithner has proposed a framework for legislation to regulate derivatives.

== Regulation of credit rating agencies ==
Rating agencies such as Moody's and Standard and Poor's provide risk ratings for securities such as bonds and the mortgage-backed securities at the heart of the crisis. They are paid by the company issuing the bonds, which presents an independence issue. The rating agencies grossly erred in their assessment of risky mortgage-backed securities, providing the highest safety rating to securities that later became worthless.

The Financial Crisis Inquiry Commission reported in January 2011 that: "The three credit rating agencies were key enablers of the financial meltdown. The mortgage-related securities at the heart of the crisis could not have been marketed and sold without their seal of approval. Investors relied on them, often blindly. In some cases, they were obligated to use them, or regulatory capital standards were hinged on them. This crisis could not have happened without the rating agencies. Their ratings helped the market soar and their downgrades through 2007 and 2008 wreaked havoc across markets and firms."

== Other topics ==
=== Federal regulatory influence of states ===
Some have argued that, despite attempts by various U.S. states to prevent the growth of a secondary market in repackaged predatory loans, the Treasury Department's Office of the Comptroller of the Currency, at the insistence of national banks, struck down such attempts as violations of Federal banking laws.

=== Conservative criticism before Congress ===
During March 1995 congressional hearings William A. Niskanen, chair of the Cato Institute, criticized the proposals for political favoritism in allocating credit and micromanagement by regulators, and that there was no assurance that banks would not be expected to operate at a loss. He predicted they would be very costly to the economy and banking system, and that the primary long-term effect would be to contract the banking system. He recommended Congress repeal CRA.

Gerald P. O'Driscoll, former vice president at the Federal Reserve Bank of Dallas, stated that Fannie Mae and Freddie Mac had become classic examples of crony capitalism. Government backing let Fannie and Freddie dominate the mortgage underwriting. "The politicians created the mortgage giants, which then returned some of the profits to the pols - sometimes directly, as campaign funds; sometimes as "contributions" to favored constituents."

Some lawmakers received favorable treatment from financial institutions involved in the subprime industry. (See Countrywide financial political loan scandal). In June 2008 Conde Nast Portfolio reported that numerous Washington, DC politicians over recent years had received mortgage financing at noncompetitive rates at Countrywide Financial because the corporation considered the officeholders under a program called "FOA's"—"Friends of Angelo". Angelo being Countrywide's Chief Executive Angelo Mozilo. On 18 June 2008, a Congressional ethics panel started examining allegations that chairman of the Senate Banking Committee, Christopher Dodd (D-CT), and the chairman of the Senate Budget Committee, Kent Conrad (D-ND) received preferential loans by troubled mortgage lender Countrywide Financial Corp. Two former CEOs of Fannie Mae Franklin Raines and James A. Johnson also received preferential loans from the troubled mortgage lender. Fannie Mae was the biggest buyer of Countrywide's mortgages.

On September 10, 2003, U.S. Congressman Ron Paul gave a speech to Congress in which he argued that the then-current government policies encouraged lending to people who couldn't afford to pay the money back, and he predicted that this would lead to a bailout, and he introduced a bill to abolish these policies.

=== State and local governmental programs ===
As part of the 1995 National Homeownership Strategy, HUD advocated greater involvement of state and local organizations in the promotion of affordable housing. In addition, it promoted the use of low or no-down payment loans and second, unsecured loans to the borrower to pay their down payments (if any) and closing costs. This idea manifested itself in "silent second" loans that became popular in several states such as California, and in scores of cities such as San Francisco. Using federal funds and their own funds, these states and cities offered borrowers loans that would defray the cost of the down payment. The loans were called "silent" because the primary lender was not supposed to know about them. A Neighborhood Reinvestment Corporation (affiliated with HUD) publicity sheet explicitly described the desired secrecy: "[The NRC affiliates] hold the second mortgages. Instead of going to the family, the monthly voucher is paid to [the NRC affiliates]. In this way the voucher is "invisible" to the traditional lender and the family (emphasis added).

In addition to the use of "silent seconds" HUD condoned and promoted the use of down payment gifting programs. These programs generally worked as follows: "Let's say someone wanted to buy a $100,000 house but didn't have the required down payment and closing costs, which we will say totaled $6,000. A nonprofit 'affordable housing' organization would provide the required $6000 to the homebuyer as a 'gift' and, simultaneously, collect the same amount — plus a tidy fee (usually 1% or a flat fee) — from the seller. The amount collected from the seller was called a 'donation' but, in reality, it was simply money laundering, conducted by pious organizations that talked about the poor and needy while raking in millions in revenues. Although HUD's Inspector General urged, in 2000, that seller-funded gift programs be banned, HUD resisted until 2008, well after the beginning of the subprime mortgage crisis. Seller-funded down payments were finally banned by an act of Congress in 2008.

=== Importance of home equity extraction to economic growth ===
A significant driver of economic growth during the Bush administration was home equity extraction, in essence borrowing against the value of the home to finance personal consumption. Free cash used by consumers from equity extraction doubled from $627 billion in 2001 to $1,428 billion in 2005 as the housing bubble built, a total of nearly $5 trillion over the period. Using the home as a source of funds also reduced the net savings rate significantly. By comparison, GDP grew by approximately $2.3 trillion during the same 2001–2005 period in current dollars, from $10.1 to $12.4 trillion.

Economist Paul Krugman wrote in 2009: "The prosperity of a few years ago, such as it was — profits were terrific, wages not so much — depended on a huge bubble in housing, which replaced an earlier huge bubble in stocks. And since the housing bubble isn't coming back, the spending that sustained the economy in the pre-crisis years isn't coming back either." Niall Ferguson stated that excluding the effect of home equity extraction, the U.S. economy grew at a 1% rate during the Bush years. Since GDP growth is a significant indicator of the success of economic policy, the government had a vested interest in not fully explaining the role of home equity extraction (borrowing) in driving the GDP measure pre-crisis.

=== Moral hazard from other bailouts ===
A taxpayer-funded government bailout of financial institutions during the savings and loan crisis may have created a moral hazard and acted as encouragement to lenders to make similar higher risk loans.
