= Flanery =

Flanery is a surname of Irish origin. Variants include Flannery, Flannary, Flanary, O'Flannery, and others.

People with this name include:

- Bridget Flanery (born 1970), American actress
- Jim Flanery (born 1965), women's basketball coach at Creighton University, in Omaha, Nebraska, U.S.
- Lola Flanery, actress who starred in the American-Canadian sci-fi series The 100.
- Mary Elliott Flanery (1867–1933), American social reformer, suffragist, politician, and journalist
- Patrick Flanery (born 1975), American author and academic resident in Australia
- Sean Patrick Flanery (born 1965), American actor

== See also ==
- Flannery (disambiguation)
- Flanery Branch, a stream in St. Francois County in Missouri, U.S.
