= M. E. Sharpe =

American publisher

- Status: Part of Routledge as of 2014
- Founded: 1958
- Founder: Myron Sharpe
- Country of origin: United States
- Headquarters location: Armonk, New York
- Publication types: Books, academic journals
- Nonfiction topics: Social sciences, humanities, business management, public administration
- Imprints: East Gate Books, Sharpe Reference
- Official website: mesharpe.com

M. E. Sharpe, Inc., an academic publisher, was founded by Myron Emanuel Sharpe in 1958 with the original purpose of publishing translation journals from Russian social sciences and humanities, with a special emphasis on international studies. In the 1960s, the translation project was expanded to include other European languages, featuring English articles, then Chinese and later Japanese. In the 1980s, the book division was expanded and it currently publishes approximately 60 new titles a year, including works in economics, business, management, public administration, political science, history and literature. At present, the firm publishes over 35 periodicals including Challenge: The Magazine of Economic Affairs, Journal of Management Information Systems, International Journal of Electronic Commerce, Journal of Post-Keynesian Economics and Problems of Post-Communism.

Several Nobel Prize winners, including Kenzaburō Ōe and Wassily Leontief, are among M. E. Sharpe authors, as is the acclaimed American novelist Howard Fast, author of Spartacus. The East Gate Books imprint is widely recognized as representing the best in Asian Studies.

In 1995, Sharpe Reference was founded to provide essential reference material for the high school, undergraduate, and general reader—again, building on Sharpe's areas of strength in American studies and global studies. The full, updated content of many of these reference sets is also available in electronic editions published by Sharpe Online Reference.

M. E. Sharpe, Inc. started in New York City and was originally called International Arts and Sciences Press. After twelve years in the city, the firm moved to White Plains, New York. Its offices have been based in Armonk, New York, since 1980.

M. E. Sharpe was sold to Routledge in 2014.

== Books ==
M. E. Sharpe specializes in social sciences, humanities, business management and public administration.

== Journals ==
Some journals published by M.E. Sharpe include:

- Challenge: The Magazine of Economic Affairs
- European Education
- Problems of Post-Communism
- Journal of Economic Issues
- Journal of Management Information Systems
- Journal of Post Keynesian Economics
- International Journal of Political Economy
