= Angela Kerins =

Irish businesswoman

Angela Kerins (née MacCarthy; born 1956) is an Irish business person and former chief executive officer of the Rehab Group.

== Background ==
Born Angela MacCarthy in Waterford, Ireland in 1958, Kerins grew up in Cashel and Tramore.

== Education ==
Kerins attended secondary school at the Presentation Convent in Cashel, and subsequently trained as a nurse at Orsett Hospital School of Nursing in Essex, United Kingdom. She then undertook postgraduate training in midwifery. As a student, Kerins campaigned to improve pay for trainee nurses.

== Career ==
At the request of her parents, Kerins returned to Ireland to work at the Meath Hospital in Dublin. She then moved to the United Arab Emirates where she worked in emergency medicine, oncology, and intensive care. Later, Kerins moved to Dhahran in Saudi Arabia, where she ran a rehabilitation centre.

When Kerins returned to Ireland again, she was appointed to the Board of the National Council for the Elderly. She later served as Chair of the Women's Political Association, of the European Year of People with Disabilities (2003), and of the Equality Authority (2007–2012). She has been a member of the National Rehabilitation Board, the Broadcasting Commission of Ireland, the Commission for Communications Regulation Consumer Advisory Panel, the board of the Dublin Dental Hospital, the Board of FÁS International, the Health Information and Quality Authority, and the National Executive of the Irish Business and Employers Confederation. It was through the National Rehabilitation Board that she met Frank Flannery of The Rehab Group.

=== Rehab Group ===
Kerins joined the Rehab Group in 1991 and was appointed Director of Public Affairs and Group Development. In 1995, she formed RehabCare, the Group's health and social division, and became its chief executive. From 1996, she served as the Rehab Group's permanent representative at the United Nations Economic and Social Council. In 1999, Kerins was appointed as the first chair of the National Disability Authority. Kerins was appointed chief executive of the Rehab Group in 2006. Kerins also served a period as the President of the European Platform for Rehabilitation.

Kerins was registered as Director of Rehab UK on 14 July 2005 and was listed as Chief Executive of Rehab Group Services Limited from 23 October 2006. She was listed as Director and Chief Executive of Momentum Scotland from 6 September 2001.

Kerins was previously listed as Director of 3 other UK companies, which are now dissolved:

- Direct Time Limited: 28 March 1989 – 23 February 2010
- The Training and Business Group Limited: 31 March 1989 – 17 May 2011
- The Training and Business Factory (South London) Limited: 18 January 1990 – 23 February 2010

On 27 February 2014, Kerins was called before the Public Accounts Committee (PAC) of Dáil Éireann, the Irish parliament. Kerins resigned as head of the Rehab Group on 2 April 2014, amid controversy over management salaries and low profits from the Rehab Lottery; she was in receipt of €240,000 per annum but according to an Irish Times report she "initially refused to disclose her salary", which was eventually disclosed by the Rehab Group following "sustained pressure". Her salary was, according to Anne Hannify head of Fundraising Ireland, "actually quite out of kilter with even what the top CEO's of charities are being paid at the moment". Kerins also cited threats to her personal safety as a factor in her resignation.

==== Legal action ====
In 2016, Kerins commenced legal action against the PAC in the Irish High Court, alleging that the content and scope of the Committee's questions were inappropriate and beyond their remit. Kerins also stated that the encounter contributed to a March 2014 suicide attempt and to her later resignation from her role as CEO. Kerins lost her case, a decision which she subsequently appealed to the Supreme Court of Ireland.

On 27 February 2019, the Supreme Court ruled in favour of Kerins on several issues, including that the PAC had acted outside its remit. The Court determined that the PAC had violated the legislation as a whole by departing significantly from its mandate and the terms of an invitation to Ms. Kerins, which allowed for inquiries regarding her pay and the management of three State-funded programmes by Rehab. In September 2025, Kerins submitted a claim for legal costs of €2.1 million arising from the case.

== Awards ==
In 2003, Kerins was awarded an honorary Doctor of Laws degree at University College Dublin.

== Personal life ==
Kerins is married to Seán Kerins, whom she met at a party at the Richmond Hospital in Dublin. They have a daughter and a son. Kerins is a former member of Fianna Fáil.
