= Rehab Group =

Healthcare and training charity

- Predecessor: Rehabilitation Institute
- Formation: 1949
- Founded at: Dublin, Ireland
- Type: Nonprofit
- Registration no.: 20006716 (Charities Regulator of Ireland); 1012691 (Charity Commission for England and Wales)
- Legal status: Charity
- Purpose: "provides services for [..] people with disabilities or disadvantage in their communities throughout Ireland and the UK"
- Location: Dublin, Ireland
- CEO: Laura Keane
- Revenue: €146,083,000 (2019)
- Staff: 106 (2018)
- Website: https://www.rehab.ie/

The Rehab Group is an international not-for-profit organisation providing health and social care, training and education, rehabilitation, employment and commercial services. Operating primarily in Ireland and the United Kingdom, it was originally established in 1949 as the Rehabilitation Institute, and provided training services to people with tuberculosis. In 2014 and 2015, a number of controversies involving the Rehab Group (and several other charities in Ireland) resulted in the resignation of the organisation's then CEO, a reduction in donations to several charities, and changes to the regulation of charities in Ireland.

== Services ==
The organisation operates in several countries and provides services to people with disabilities (physical, sensory and intellectual), people with autism, people with acquired brain injury, people with mental health issues, older people, carers and others who are marginalised.

In Ireland, Rehab Group operates through a number of divisions. These include RehabCare (a health and social care division providing resource centres, residential and supported accommodation, outreach and respite care services), National Learning Network (a training and employment provider), and Rehab Enterprises (a commercial provider of recycling, logistics, packaging and retail services). The latter is described by the charity as "Ireland's largest non-government employer of people with disabilities".

In the United Kingdom, Rehab Group operates through a number of organisations. These include TBG Learning (a training and employment provider of learning and employability supports to people in Wales and England), Momentum (a rehabilitation, training and care service provider operating in Scotland and England), and the Chaseley Trust (which operates a residential home and independent living accommodation in Eastbourne). A further division, Rehab JobFit, is a partnership which supports the Department for Work and Pensions in delivering the Work Programme and the Mandatory Work Activity Programme in Wales and South West England.

In the Netherlands and Poland, the Rehab group provides service through its Rehab Enterprises division. In Poland, this division provides logistics, computer keyboard printing and electronic equipment repair services, while in the Netherlands, it manages product returns for software manufacturers.

== Controversies ==
=== Salaries ===
In 2014 and 2015, there was significant controversy when it was revealed that Rehab Chief Executive Angela Kerins was in receipt of a "high" salary of €240,000 and that former board member Frank Flannery had been paid more than €400,000 in "consultancy fees". It was also reported that the charity had used state funds (intended for charitable purposes) to lease cars for its staff. Following additional focus on the low profits from the charity's lotteries, Kerins retired "due to the impact of the controversies on the Rehab Group and on her family". In December 2015 it was reported that donations dropped by "36 per cent [..] in the wake of the pay scandal". Other charities also reported a drop in donations attributed to "mismanagement" in Rehab and other charities such as the Central Remedial Clinic. Rehab's reputation in Ireland was also described as "tarnished" in 2017, after the Irish Times revealed that the charity's fundraising scratchcard scheme was performing extremely poorly and that "Rehab had made profits of only €9,452 on €4 million in scratchcard sales".

=== Protests ===
In November 2018 a group of twenty people occupied the Rehab offices in Park West (Dublin), protesting over the lack of supports offered to people with polio. The protestors claimed that following a merger with the Polio Fellowship of Ireland, Rehab possessed €8m in assets and income, which was not being used to support people with polio. They claimed that "these assets were bought with funds raised by polio survivors, their families and friends. Only 7 per cent of this money has been spent on people who had polio".

=== Incidents and investigations ===
In early 2020 it was reported that the charity was investigating an "alleged fraud" involving one of its wholly owned subsidiaries.

In March 2022 the group advised the Data Protection Commissioner that it was the target of a ransomware attack. and since then external specialists have been examining their systems. Ossian Smyth told RTÉ News that the attackers had tried to get patient details and financial information, but that there was no evidence that it had been misused or that scams had been reported in connection with the attack. As of late March 2020, there had been no disruption of services.

== Patronage ==
From 1975 until 2018, the group organised the "People of the Year Awards". This was a set of awards which recognised contributions to Irish and international society.

== See also ==
- European Platform for Rehabilitation
