= Jeff Madrick =

American journalist, author and economics columnist

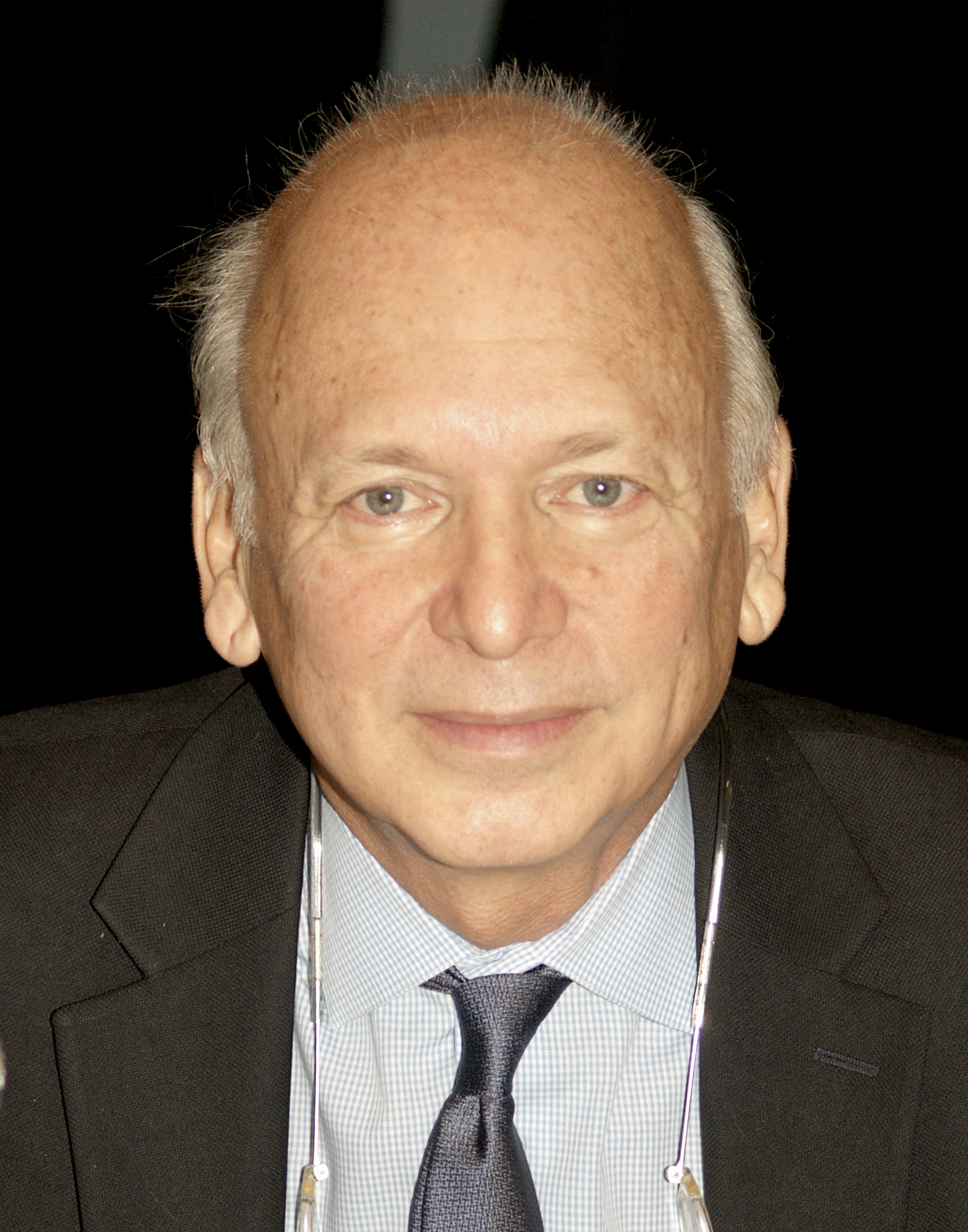
- Madrick at the 2010 Brooklyn Book Festival
- Born: Jeffrey G. Madrick
- Spouse: Kim Baker

Academic background
- Education: Harvard University

Academic work
- Institutions: The Cooper Union
- Main interests: Economic policy
- Website: jeffmadrick.com

Jeffrey G. Madrick is an American journalist and author specializing in economic policy matters. He is editor of Challenge: The Magazine of Economic Affairs, a visiting professor at The Cooper Union, and Director of the Bernard L. Schwartz Rediscovering Government Initiative at the Century Foundation. He is a regular contributor to The New York Review of Books and a former economics columnist for The New York Times and Harper's Magazine. He has also contributed to online publications such as The Daily Beast and Huffington Post.

He has written for many other publications, including Boston Review, The Boston Globe, The Washington Post, Los Angeles Times, Institutional Investor, The Nation, American Prospect, Newsday, and the business, op-ed, and magazine sections of The New York Times. He has appeared on Charlie Rose, The NewsHour with Jim Lehrer, NOW With Bill Moyers, Frontline, CNN, CNBC, CBS, and NPR. He has served as a policy consultant for Sen. Edward M. Kennedy and other U.S. legislators.

Madrick is the author of numerous books. The Case for Big Government was a Finalist (runner-up) for the PEN Galbraith General Non-Fiction Award for 2007–2008. Taking America and The End of Affluence were New York Times Notable Books of the Year. His 2011 book Age of Greed argued that the anti-government rhetoric of the 1970s, combined with deregulation of the financial sector, resulted in tremendous damage to the American economy.

Madrick was educated at New York University and Harvard University, and was a Shorenstein Fellow at Harvard. From the 1970s to 1990s, he held various journalistic positions including finance editor of Business Week, Wall Street editor of Money Magazine, and NBC News reporter and commentator. He has been honored with an Emmy and a Page One Award.

== Bibliography ==
=== Books ===
- Taking America: How We Got from the First Hostile Takeover to Megamergers, Corporate Raiding, and Scandal. New York: Bantam Books. 1987. ISBN 978-0553052299.
- The End of Affluence: The Causes and Consequences of America's Economic Dilemma. New York: Random House, 1995. ISBN 978-0679436232
- Unconventional Wisdom: Alternative Perspectives on the New Economy, edited by Jeff Madrick. New York: Century Foundation Press, 2000. ISBN 978-0870784446
- Why Economies Grow: The Forces That Shape Prosperity and How to Get Them Working Again. New York: Basic Books, 2002. ISBN 978-0465043118
- The Case for Big Government. Princeton, N.J.: Princeton University Press, 2008. ISBN 978-0691123318
- Age of Greed: The Triumph of Finance and the Decline of America, 1970 to the Present. New York: Alfred A. Knopf, 2011. ISBN 978-1400041718
- Seven Bad Ideas: How Mainstream Economists Have Damaged America and the World. New York: Alfred A. Knopf, 2014. ISBN 978-0307961181
- How Big Should Our Government Be?, co-authored with Jon Bakija, Lane Kenworthy, Peter Lindert. University of California Press, 2016. ISBN 978-0520291829
- Invisible Americans: The Tragic Cost of Child Poverty. New York: Alfred A. Knopf, 2020. ISBN 978-0451494184

=== Essays and reporting ===
- Economic Returns from Transportation Investment (Report). Lansdowne, VA: Eno Transportation Foundation. 1996. LCCN 97168759. Prepared by Jeffrey Madrick.
- Madrick, Jeff (1 January 2009). "No New Tax Cuts: The Case for Big Government". Boston Review.
- Madrick, Jeff (November 2012). "The Entitlement Crisis That Isn't". The Anti-Economist. Harper's Magazine. Vol. 325, no. 1950. pp. 11–13.
- Madrick, Jeff (12 March 2013). "We Need a Shadow CBO". The Anti-Economist. Harper's Magazine.
- Galbraith, John Kenneth (2017) [1992]. "New Foreword by Jeff Madrick". The Culture of Contentment. Princeton University Press. ISBN 978-0691171654.
