= Challenge (economics magazine) =

Magazine

Challenge: The Magazine of Economic Affairs
- Editor: Jeff Madrick
- Categories: Economics
- Frequency: Bimonthly
- Publisher: Routledge
- First issue: 1952; 74 years ago
- Website: Homepage
- ISSN: 0577-5132
- OCLC: 241545833

Challenge: The Magazine of Economic Affairs is a bimonthly magazine covering current affairs in economics. It is published by Routledge and the editor-in-chief is Jeff Madrick (The Cooper Union).

== History ==
The magazine was established in 1952 and originally published by the Institute of Economic Affairs (New York University). It ceased publishing in 1967 but was revived in 1973 and published by M. E. Sharpe which was later taken over by Routledge.

== Abstracting and indexing ==
The magazine is abstracted and indexed in:

- Association for Asian Studies
- EBSCO databases
- EconLit
- InfoTrac databases
- International Bibliography of the Social Sciences
- International Bibliography of Periodical Literature
- International Atomic Energy Agency
- PAIS International
- ProQuest databases
