= Frank Partnoy =

Frank Partnoy is a Professor of Law at the University of California Berkeley School of Law. He served as the George E. Barrett Professor of Law and Finance and established the Center on Corporate and Securities Law at the University of San Diego, where he taught for 21 years. He is a scholar of the complexities of modern finance and financial market regulation. He worked as a derivatives structurer at Morgan Stanley and CS First Boston during the mid-1990s and wrote F.I.A.S.C.O.: Blood in the Water on Wall Street, a book about his experiences there.

== Biography ==
Since 1997, he has been a law professor, and writing and speaking about markets to Congress, regulators, academics, and investors. He has written opinion pieces for The New York Times and the Financial Times, and more than two dozen scholarly articles published in academic journals including The Journal of Finance.

His books include Infectious Greed: How Deceit and Risk Corrupted the Financial Markets, a corporate law casebook, and The Match King: Ivar Kreuger, The Financial Genius Behind a Century of Wall Street Scandals, about the 1920s markets and Ivar Kreuger, who many consider the father of modern financial schemes, which was a finalist for the Financial Times/Goldman Sachs Business Book of the Year in 2009. His most recent book is WAIT: The Art and Science of Delay, published by PublicAffairs in June 2012.

Partnoy also has been a consultant to many corporations, banks, pension funds, and hedge funds regarding various aspects of financial markets and regulation.

== Scholarship ==
=== Casebooks ===
- CORPORATIONS: A CONTEMPORARY APPROACH (Thomson 2010) (with Alan R. Palmiter)
- BUSINESS ORGANIZATION AND FINANCE, LEGAL AND ECONOMIC PRINCIPLES (with John C. Coffee, Jr. and William A. Klein) (Thomson 2010)

=== Book chapters ===
- How Financial Regulation Might Harness the Power of Markets, in RULES FOR GROWTH: PROMOTING INNOVATION AND GROWTH THROUGH LEGAL REFORM (Ewing Marion Kauffman Foundation 2011)
- Overdependence on Credit Ratings Was a Primary Cause of the Crisis, in THE PANIC OF 2008: CAUSES, CONSEQUENCES, AND IMPLICATIONS FOR REFORM (Edward Elgar Press 2010, Lawrence Mitchell and Arthur Wilmarth, eds.)
- Gap Filling, Hedge Funds, and Financial Innovation, in NEW FINANCIAL INSTRUMENTS AND INSTITUTIONS: OPPORTUNITIES AND POLICY CHALLENGES (Brookings Institution Press 2007, Yasuyuki Fuchita and Robert E. Litan, eds.) (with Randall Thomas)
- How and Why Credit Rating Agencies Are Not Like Other Gatekeepers, in FINANCIAL GATEKEEPERS: CAN THEY PROTECT INVESTORS? (Brookings Institution Press 2006, Yasuyuki Fuchita and Robert E. Litan, eds.)
- Enron and the Derivatives World, in ENRON: CORPORATE FIASCOS AND THEIR IMPLICATIONS (Foundation Press 2004, Nancy B. Rapoport and Bala G. Dharan, eds.)
- ISDA, NASD, CFMA, and SDNY: The Four Horsemen of Derivatives Regulation?, in BROOKINGS-WHARTON PAPERS ON FINANCIAL SERVICES (Brookings Institution Press 2002, Robert E. Litan and Richard Herring, eds.)
- The Paradox of Credit Ratings, in THE ROLE OF CREDIT REPORTING SYSTEMS IN THE INTERNATIONAL ECONOMY (Kluwer Academic Publishers 2002, Richard M. Levitch, Giovanni Majnoni, and Carmen Reinhart, eds.)

=== Published articles ===
- Partnoy, Frank (10 June 2020). "The Looming Bank Collapse". The Atlantic (July/August 2020). ISSN 1072-7825.. Partnoy warns that collateralized loan obligations and other financial practices could lead American banking to collapse after the COVID-19 crisis.
- The Abraham L. Pomerantz Lecture: Don't Blink: Snap Decisions and Securities Regulation, 77 BROOKLYN LAW REVIEW 151 (2011)
- Patents as Options, in Perspectives on Commercializing Innovation (F. Scott Keefe, ed.) (with Shaun P. Martin) (Cambridge University Press 2011)
- Credit Rating Agencies under the Dodd-Frank Act, 30 BANKING & FINANCIAL SERVICES POLICY REPORT 1 (Dec. 2011) (with Aline Darbellay)
- Credit Default Swap Spreads as Viable Substitutes for Credit Ratings, 158 UNIVERSITY OF PENNSYLVANIA LAW REVIEW 2085 (2010) (with Mark J. Flannery and Joel F. Houston)
- Bring Transparency to Off-Balance Sheet Accounting, Roosevelt Institute White Paper, Mar. 2010 (with Lynn E. Turner)
- Historical Perspectives on the Financial Crisis: Ivar Kreuger, the Credit Rating Agencies, and Two Theories about the Function, and Dysfunction, of Markets, 26 YALE JOURNAL ON REGULATION 431 (2009)
- Shapeshifting Corporations, 76 UNIVERSITY OF CHICAGO LAW REVIEW 261 (2009)
- Rethinking Regulation of Credit Rating Agencies: An Institutional Investor Perspective, Council of Institutional Investors White Paper, Apr. 2009
- The Match King, Chapter 9: The Author’s Cut, 1207 (2009) in the Michigan State Law Review
- The New Shareholder Activism (with Randall S. Thomas)
- The Returns to Hedge Fund Activism, 64 FINANCIAL ANALYSTS JOURNAL 27 (2008) (with Alon Brav, Wei Jiang, and Randall Thomas)
- Hedge Fund Activism, Corporate Governance, and Firm Performance, 63 JOURNAL OF FINANCE 1729 (2008) (with Alon Brav, Wei Jiang, and Randall Thomas)
- The Promise and Perils of Credit Derivatives, 75 UNIVERSITY OF CINCINNATI LAW REVIEW 1019 (2007) (invited symposium) (with David A. Skeel, Jr.)
- Second-Order Benefits from Standards, 47 BOSTON COLLEGE LAW REVIEW 169 (2007)
- Alternative Structures and Strategies for Investors, 1 JOURNAL OF BUSINESS & TECHNOLOGY LAW 84 (2006)
- Financial Innovation and Corporate Law, 36 JOURNAL OF CORPORATION LAW 799 (2006)
- Encumbered Shares, 2005 UNIVERSITY OF ILLINOIS LAW REVIEW 775 (2005) (with Shaun P. Martin)
- Synthetic Common Law, 53 UNIVERSITY OF KANSAS LAW REVIEW 281 (2005)
- Strict Liability for Gatekeepers: A Reply to Professor Coffee, 84 BOSTON UNIVERSITY LAW REVIEW 365 (2004)
- A Revisionist View of Enron and the Sudden Death of "May," 48 VILLANOVA LAW REVIEW 1245 (2003) (invited symposium), reprinted in ENRON AND WORLD FINANCE: A CASE STUDY IN ETHICS (2006)
- Multinational Regulatory Competition and Single-Stock Futures, 21 NORTHWESTERN JOURNAL OF LAW AND INTERNATIONAL BUSINESS 641 (2001)
- Finance and Patent Length, University of San Diego Law & Economics Research Paper No. 19 (2001)
- Barbarians at the Gatekeepers?: A Proposal for a Modified Strict Liability Regime, 79 WASHINGTON UNIVERSITY LAW QUARTERLY 491 (2001)
- Some Policy Implications of Single-Stock Futures, FUTURES & DERIVATIVES LAW REPORT, Mar. 2001
- Derivatives on TV: A Tale of Two Derivatives Debacles in Prime-Time, GREENBAG (2001) (with Kimberly D. Krawiec and Peter H. Huang), reprinted at 2 DERIVATIVES REP. 15 (2001)
- The Shifting Contours of Global Derivatives Regulation, 22 UNIVERSITY OF PENNSYLVANIA JOURNAL OF INTERNATIONAL ECONOMIC LAW 421 (2001)
- Why Markets Crash and What Law Can Do About It, 61 UNIVERSITY OF PITTSBURGH LAW REVIEW 741 (2000)
- Adding Derivatives to the Corporate Law Mix, 34 GEORGIA LAW REVIEW 599 (2000)
- The Siskel and Ebert of Financial Markets: Two Thumbs Down for the Credit Rating Agencies, 77 WASHINGTON UNIVERSITY LAW QUARTERLY 619 (1999), reprinted at 33 SECURITIES LAW REVIEW 161 (2001)
- Financial Derivatives and the Costs of Regulatory Arbitrage, 22 JOURNAL OF CORPORATION LAW 211 (1997)

== Bibliography ==
- F.I.A.S.C.O.: Blood in the Water on Wall Street
- Infectious Greed: How Deceit and Risk Corrupted the Financial Markets
- The Match King: Ivar Kreuger, The Financial Genius Behind a Century of Wall Street Scandals
- WAIT: The Art and Science of Delay
