= Association of Catholic Priests =

Irish organisation

- Cumann na Sagart Caitliceach
- Abbreviation: ACP
- Established: 1 September 2010 (16 years, 2 months)
- Type: Catholic, voluntary association
- Region served: Ireland
- Members: 1000
- Leaders: Tim Hazelwood; Roy Donovan; Gerry O'Connor; John Collins
- Key people: Brian D'Arcy; Tony Flannery
- Affiliations: Association of Catholics in Ireland
- Website: associationofcatholicpriests.ie

The Association of Catholic Priests (ACP) is an independent and voluntary association of Catholic clergy in Ireland. The association was established on 1 September 2010 with the objective of having "a forum, and a voice to reflect, discuss and comment on issues affecting the Irish Church and society today". Its lay, sister organisation is the Association of Catholics in Ireland.

The group was founded by priests as a "forum to discuss theological issues" and as an "independent body to fight for the rights of priests and defend them in situations where their bishops have refused support".

Since inception the ACP have frequently called for a synodal pathway and increased transparency from Irish bishops and have challenged their purported lack of openness as at odds with the approach of Pope Francis and the Second Vatican Council. These have included in handling cases of clerical abuse, greater involvement of lay people within church governance, results of public consultations, the treatment of priests.

In 2012 Fr Brendan Hoban, co-founder of the ACP, wrote in The Irish Times, "If ever we needed to speak the truth as we see it, then surely this is the time." Following the publication of the national synthesis document response in 2022, the Irish Times reflected on the ACPs call for change "Ten years later it would appear that no less a person than the Catholic Primate, Archbishop Eamon Martin, is thinking along the same lines."

== Theology ==
The ACP has said that they follow the teaching of the Church and fully accept the Creed. Their position is that they do not seek to overturn the teaching of the Church but believe there is confusion between the teaching of the Church and Church governance.

The ACP's acceptance of the Creed and adherence to defined teaching of the Catholic Church has been challenged by some conservative news sites such as The Catholic World Report. This is due in part to the association adopting a neutral position in the 2015 referendum which would allow same sex couples to have civil marriages, and in the 2018 abortion referendum where they asked parishses to stop allowing referendum campaigners to use the pulpit during Mass.

== Vocations ==
In June 2014, the issue of vocations was discussed at the Irish Catholic Bishops Conference in Maynooth. The ACP called for the Church to have a plan for vocations. Father Sean McDonagh stated that the Church is "facing an implosion in terms of vocations to the priesthood." In this regard, the ACP advocates the appointment of female deacons. According to McDonagh:

It's fairly clear historically that women have served in the Church, despite every effort to silence their voices since the 4th century.

The ACP also called for men who left the priesthood to marry to be called back to ministry in some form. McDonagh claimed that if the ACP's recommendations were not acted on, parish churches could be forced to close down.

In October 2019, former President of Ireland Mary McAleese spoke at a conference organised by the Association of Catholic Priests, which was titled 'Women and the Church: Equality of Opportunity?'.

== Communion ==
The report of the apostolic visitation to Ireland expressed some concerns about the communio (communion or unity) of the Church. The ACP claims "We cherish and we value and we wish to further the unity of all our people, with our fellow clergy, with Religious, with our bishops and with the Successor of Peter."

== Censure ==
Members of the association have been censured by the Roman Curia. The Congregation for the Doctrine of the Faith (CDF) placed restrictions on the association's founder, Fr Tony Flannery who is a member of the Redemptorist Congregation. He was advised by Rome to go to a monastery where he might "pray and reflect" on his views and his role with the association. His monthly column in the congregation's monthly magazine, "Reality", has been discontinued. Restrictions have also been imposed on the magazine itself and its editor, Fr Gerard Moloney.

Supporters of the censure cite that the Vatican has "a sacred obligation to investigate any religious whose teaching is contrary to that of the church: to defend those sacred teachings: and to protect the faithful from all taint of error and corruption." Other supporters advocate that those censured by the CDF are free to set up a rival church:

Those with strong private theories and opinions have plenty of churches to choose from and, if they find none to their liking, they can always set up another.

Since that time, it has emerged that three other priests have also been silenced: Marist priest Fr Seán Fagan, Capuchin priest Fr Owen O'Sullivan and Passionist priest Fr Brian D'Arcy.

At a conference organised by the ACP in Dublin's Regency Hotel, Fr Brendan Hoban told the gathering "that clamping down on "wayward" opinions was not the way to deal with issues".

Following the publication of the National Synethesis document in 2022, the Irish Times acknowledged the contribution of ACP co-founder Fr Tony Flannery and called for his re-instatement, saying he was:

[...] now 10 years out of public ministry in the church because he called for the changes subsequently repeated in the National Synthesis document. His continuous exile to limbo is itself a scandal and smacks now of mere, petty revenge. It is an ongoing and grave injustice and he should be reinstated to full ministry.

== Achievements ==
Its intervention in the case of Fr Kevin Reynolds, who was libelled in RTÉ's "Prime Time Investigates" programme – Mission to Prey – in May 2011 was instrumental in securing an apology from the broadcaster.

In April 2012 it published a survey that it commissioned which revealed that nine out of 10 of the 1,000 interviewed practising Catholics (35 per cent attend Mass once a week, 51 per cent once or more each month and 20 per cent a few times a year) said priests should be allowed to marry, with 77 per cent believing women should be ordained and three-quarters of respondents not seeing Catholic Church teachings on sexuality as relevant to them or to their family.

On 30 May 2012, a steering group under the umbrella of the ACP met in All Hallows College, Dublin. The meeting, was attended by about 200 people and resulted in the establishment of a new lay organisation for Irish Catholics with an interim title of the "Association of Catholics in Ireland". The new association committed itself to "the renewal of the Catholic faith in the changed and changing circumstances of the 21st century and to the reform of the institutional church which, at this time, is experiencing conflict, crisis and lack of credibility". In November 2012, at a meeting attended by over 300 people, the objectives of the Association of Catholics in Ireland were formally approved.

In 2018 they wrote to the Irish Bishops Conference calling for a synodal assembly on church reform. In 2021 the bishops announced a national synod to discuss the way forward for the church in Ireland. In 2022 the results of the National Synthesis Document were sent to the Vatican, which confirmed that the majority of Irish Catholics wanted major change in areas including lay participation, the church's attitude to women and the removal of mandatory celibacy for priests. The response was sent to the Vatican with The Irish Times reporting "the contribution of the Association of Catholic Priests over the past 10 years be underestimated, particularly of co-founders Fr Brendan Hoban and Fr Tony Flannery". Former President of Ireland Mary McAleese commented on the final document "Clearly there was a very, very strong movement for reform and change and this is reflected fairly and truthfully [...] There's no denying those voices now. I hope when it is received in Rome it will be fully honoured."

== Criticism ==
The ACP has been criticised by the conservative Catholics in The Irish Catholic and The Catholic World Report.

Writing in The Catholic World Report, founder of the Iona Institute and conservative columnist David Quinn described ACP as a "sub-section of priests who want the Catholic Church to adopt the failed project of liberal Protestantism."

In 2019 Michael Kelly, editor of The Irish Catholic disputed the suggestion by the ACP that ordaining married men and women would reverse the decline in vocations for the priesthood, citing the steep decline in membership and vocations in the Church of England and mainstream Protestant denominations in Northern Europe, all of which ordain married men and women.

The founder of the right-wing Catholic conservative media group Church Militant has referred to the ACP as a "group of dissident priests".

== See also ==
- We Are Church
- Call To Action
