= Tony Flannery =

Religious writer and former Redemptorist Roman Catholic priest

The Reverend Dr. Tony Flannery CSsR
- Born: January 1947 (age 79)
- Church: Catholic Church
- Ordained: 1974
- Congregations served: Congregation of the Most Holy Redeemer

Anthony "Tony" Flannery, CSsR (born January 1947) is an Irish Catholic religious writer and a suspended Redemptorist priest. He is the founder of the Irish Association of Catholic Priests. For 14 years, he has been writing a monthly article for Reality Magazine published by the Redemptorists, and has contributed to many other publications.

Flannery was suspended by the Vatican in 2012. He said he was told by the Vatican that he would be allowed to return to ministry only if he agreed to write, sign and publish a statement agreeing, among other things, that women can never be ordained as priests and that he would adhere to church orthodoxy on matters like contraception and homosexuality. The Congregation for the Doctrine of the Faith pointed out that Flannery's views could be construed as "heresy" under church law, and threatened "canonical penalties," including excommunication, if he did not change his views.

== Views ==
In the past he has denied the church's teachings on a variety of controversial issues, including the ordination of women. As a result, he was investigated by the Vatican's Congregation for the Doctrine of the Faith. In April 2012 he was penalized by the Congregation.

As of January 2013 he was reported to have rejected the Vatican's orders to remain silent, stating, "I refuse to be terrified into submission." In a piece published in 2010 in Reality Magazine Flannery expressed doubt regarding transmission of priestly authority from Jesus to the priests of the Catholic Church, raising the possibility that the claim of authority was made by a group of early priests on their own behalf:

It is more likely that some time after Jesus, a select and privileged group within the community who had abrogated power and authority to themselves, interpreted the occasion of the Last Supper in a manner that suited their own agenda.

Recanting that assertion is one of the Catholic Church's demands.

On 1 October 2020 it was reported that the Congregation for the Doctrine of the Faith was insisting that Flannery sign four oaths before being returned to ministry. Some theologians see this as a throwback to the past in silencing theologians. Some also find fault with the principle that those in religious congregations cannot speak with the Congregation directly, but only through their religious superior.

== Personal life ==
He is the youngest in a family of four. He has two brothers: Peter, who is still a Redemptorist at Esker Monastery in Athenry, and Frank, the Fine Gael Director of Organisation and Strategy. He also has a sister, Geraldine, who is an acupuncturist in Tuam.

== Bibliography ==
- The Death of Religious Life? (Columba Publishing 1977)
- From the Inside (Mercier Press 1999)
- For Love or Money (Mercier Press 2001)
- Waiting in Hope: Reflections on Advent (Veritas 2003)
- Come back to Me: Reflections on Lent (Veritas 2004)
- Keeping the Faith (Mercier) 2006
- A Question of Conscience (Londubh Books 2013)

== See also ==
- Association of Catholic Priests
