= The Culture of Contentment =

1992 book by John Kenneth Galbraith

- First edition
- Author: John K. Galbraith
- Language: English
- Genre: Non-fiction
- Publisher: Houghton Mifflin Company
- Publication date: 1992

The Culture of Contentment is an essay by economist John K. Galbraith, analyzing the situation of the Western industrial world, which was first published in 1992 by Houghton Mifflin Company.

Galbraith traces the growth of a stultifying contentment in the Western industrial world, represented by the G7 group of countries. He pays particular attention to the self-serving economic comfort achieved by the fortunate and politically dominant community and contrasts this to the condition of the underclass which he sees as being for the first time in these countries stalled in poverty.

The essay is published in paperback by Mariner Books, ISBN 978-0-395-66919-8.
