= Flanery Branch =

Stream in the American state of Missouri

Coordinates: 37.767829°N 90.478457°W

Flanery Branch is a stream in St. Francois County in the U.S. state of Missouri. It is a tributary of the St. Francis River.

Flanery Branch has the name of the original owner of the site.

== See also ==
- List of rivers of Missouri
