= Patricia Higgins =

American politician

Member of the New Hampshire House of Representatives
- In office 2012–2018
- Constituency: Grafton 12

Personal details
- Party: Democratic

Patricia Higgins is an American politician from New Hampshire. She served in the New Hampshire House of Representatives.
