= Harry Flannery =

American journalist and author (1900–1975)

Harry William Flannery
- Born: Harry W. Flannery; March 13, 1900; Greensburg, Pennsylvania
- Died: March 11, 1975 (aged 74); Santa Monica, California
- Education: University of Notre Dame
- Occupations: Journalist; Radio broadcaster; Author
- Known for: On-the-spot radio reports from Berlin during World War II.; Author of best-seller Assignment To Berlin
- Spouses: Ruth Carmody; Mary Heinemann
- Children: Patricia Anne Yoder

Harry W. Flannery (March 13, 1900 – March 11, 1975) was an American journalist and author. He was the Berlin correspondent for the news division of the Columbia Broadcasting System in the years leading up to the United States involvement in World War II. In 1942, he published a bestseller about the experience, Assignment To Berlin. In 1968, he co-authored Which Way Germany, a study of the rise of fascism in pre-war Germany in the context of the Cold War Germany. In 1950, Flannery launched a failed bid for Congress as a Democrat for the 15th District in California. He briefly hosted a television talk show, Harry's Hat Rack and worked for the AFL–CIO in public relations until his retirement in 1967.

== Death ==
Harry died on 11 March 1975 in Santa Monica, California.

== External links and references ==
- Washington Reports to the People via John F. Kennedy Presidential Library And Museum, Edward R. Murrow Interview with Harry W. Flannery, 26 July 1963.
