= European Education =

- Discipline: Education
- Language: English
- Edited by: Cathryn Magno; Noah W. Sobe

Publication details
- History: 1969–present
- Publisher: Taylor & Francis
- Frequency: Quarterly

Standard abbreviations
- ISO 4: Eur. Educ.

Indexing
- ISSN: 1056-4934

Links
- Journal homepage

European Education: A Journal of Issues and Studies is a quarterly academic journal covering European education that was established in 1969 and is published by Taylor and Francis. The journal covers education policy, theory, and practice with least one thematic issue per year. The editors-in-chief are Cathryn Magno (University of Fribourg) and Noah W. Sobe (Loyola University Chicago).

== Abstracting and indexing ==
European Education is abstracted and indexed in SCOPUS, British Education Index, Education Resources Information Center, Educational Research Abstracts Online, International Bibliography of Periodical Literature, Sociology of Education Abstracts, and Wilson Education Index.
