= Jude Flannery =

American triathlete (c. 1940–1997)

Judy Flannery
- Born: Judith Marie Flannery c. 1940
- Died: April 2, 1997 (aged 57)
- Occupation: Triathlete

Judith "Judy" Marie Flannery (c. 1940 – April 2, 1997) was an American triathlete who won six consecutive US national championships between 1991 and 1996. She died after a collision with a car while training in 1997.

== Early life ==
Flannery attended a Catholic school, and was nicknamed "Saint Judy, Our Lady of Perpetual Motion." Flannery studied at the College of New Rochelle, where she completed a bachelor's degree in biochemistry. She then worked at the Rockefeller University, where she met her future husband Dennis Flannery. He was an attorney, and later served in the Army, and the couple married in 1964. In 1972, the couple moved to Chevy Chase, Maryland, and they had five children.

== Triathlon career ==
At the age of 38, Flannery took up running. Aged 47, she took up triathlon. Between 1991 and 1996, Flannery won six consecutive US age group national championships, and in 1997 she finished second in the US age group national championship. She also won four world age-group triathlon championships. She also competed at the Ironman World Championship, finishing second in her age category. Her last triathlon was in Birmingham, Alabama a week before her death. In March 1997, Flannery was named the Master Female Triathlete of the Year; aged 57, she was the oldest women ever to receive the award. In the same year, Flannery set up the United States Triathlon Women’s Commission. In 2008, she was posthumously inducted into the USA Triathlon Hall of Fame.

== Death and tributes ==
On April 2, 1997, Flannery was on a 55-mile (89 km) training ride with friends when she was involved in a collision with a car. The car was being driven by an unlicensed 16-year-old, later named as Timothy Rinehart, and Flannery was hit head-on. She died later that day. Rinehart was later given a community service order.

In 1997, the USA Triathlon Women's Committee set up the Spirit of Judy Flannery Award in memory of Flannery, and in the same year, friends of Flannery rode the Race Across America under the name "Team Jude Flannery". Flannery had planned to ride the race in order to raise money for domestic violence awareness. In November 1997, Flannery's cycling partner Cary Bland, who had been injured in the collision that resulted in Flannery's death, attempted to sue the driver for $1 million.
