= Voice of the Faithful =

Movement of practicing Catholics

Voice of the Faithful (VOTF) is a movement of practicing Catholics, founded in Boston, Massachusetts, in 2002 in the wake of allegations regarding child abuse by Catholic clergy, perceived mishandling of cases of known or suspected abuse, and pastoral failures of Catholic bishops in response to abusers and abuse survivors alike. According to Notre Dame church scholar R. Scott Appleby, Voice is "not challenging the bishops' authority but calling them to account for mismanagement". However, that view has been disputed.

== History ==
VOTF began when a small group of parishioners met in the basement of St. John the Evangelist Church in Wellesley, Massachusetts, to pray over allegations that priests in the Archdiocese of Boston had abused local youngsters. Its meetings soon became well attended, as well as attracting media attention. At its first conference in July 2002, VOTF attracted more than 4,000 lay Catholics, victims of clergy sexual abuse, theologians, priests, and religious from around the United States. Less than a year after its founding, VOTF had grown to 30,000 members worldwide, and it continues to be a voice for its thousands of members. William D'Antonio and Anthony Pogorelc documented the early history of this social movement in Voices of the Faithful: Loyal Catholics Striving for Change (2007 Crossroad Publishing) This book presents both the hard statistics about the group’s membership and frank and appreciative analysis of the group’s influence.

Its founders ran into trouble early on with language calling for a "Continental Congress" to counterbalance the hierarchy. Voice of the Faithful members were among the protesters who gathered each Sunday at the height of the crisis in the predominantly Hispanic community that is home to the Cathedral of the Holy Cross.

Three years after Voice of the Faithful formed to protest the transfers of abusive priests within the Boston Archdiocese, the movement focused on charting a more relevant strategy as a network of affiliates eager to engage bishops."When I have asked the leadership to tell me what they mean by their third goal, 'to shape structural change within the church,' they have been unable to clearly articulate its meaning or implications," Indianapolis Archbishop Daniel M. Buechlein said.

In March 2014 VOTF expressed "deep disappointment" with remarks made by Pope Francis in an interview with the Italian newspaper Corriere della Sera. In response to a question about "fanaticism and the bad faith of the secularized world that doesn’t respect childhood much", Francis replied,

I wish to say two things. The cases of abuse are terrible because they leave very profound wounds. Benedict XVI was very courageous and opened the way. And, following that way, the Church advanced a lot, perhaps more than anyone. The statistics on the phenomenon of violence against children are shocking, but they also show clearly that the great majority of the abuses come from the family environment and from people who are close. The Catholic Church is perhaps the only public institution that moved with transparency and responsibility. No one else did as much. And yet, the Church is the only one being attacked.

VOTF responded, "That the Church may have been the only institution attacked, as in the recent U.N. report, does not matter...We are disappointed that Pope Francis, with his care for the marginalized, desire for social justice and focus on clericalism and reform of the Curia, does not see that holding bishops accountable for coverups and a full release of all secret files are essential for true reform and healing.

Following his installment in December, Bishop of Bridgeport, Frank Caggiano immediately spoke with VOTF members, He met with them again on March 13, 2014 in a meeting he described as "the beginning of a conversation.' On March 19, members of VOTF joined with SNAP (Survivors Network of those Abused by Priests) demonstrated outside the Bridgeport, Connecticut Catholic Center, calling on Caggiano to hire an outside firm to investigate allegations against two priests. Caggiano agreed to meet with the demonstrators; their spokesperson said that "she would prefer to do so after he agrees to the investigation."

== Programs ==
Among VOTF's goals are: supporting clergy abuse survivors; supporting priests who are helping to heal survivors and correct institutional flaws in the Church; and working to reform governing structures in the Church so that abuse of authority could not happen again.

- "Voice of Compassion fund" takes donations from Catholics who did not want to contribute to the Archbishop's Annual Appeal, and offers the funds to Catholic Charities, bypassing the archdiocese.
- Affirming their responsibilities for the good of the Church, VOTF members offer their experiences of faith and their competencies in the Church. The Santa Barbara, California chapter drafted a program to improve implementation of the Los Angeles archdiocese's "Safeguard the Children", the system to ensure that all parishes know what to do in the event of an abuse incident.
- "Measuring and Ranking Diocesan Online Financial Transparency", ranks 177 dioceses on the availability of their financial statements and other criteria.
- Survivor Support
- Priest Support
- Bishop Selection

== Observations ==
With a membership of practicing Catholics, VOTF has always been committed to working within the Church. Early on, the group was endorsed by a number of American Catholic theologians. A 2007 article in Commonweal called the group "one of the most interesting and hopeful developments to come out of the Catholic Church’s sexual-abuse crisis."

David Zizik, founder of the diocesan Parish Leadership Forum, disputes VOTF's claim to work in and with existing church structures, citing its refusal to support interim Bishop Richard Lennon’s 2003 Lenten Prayer Initiative and opting instead for a so-called "Silent Watch", in which VOTF "called for its supporters to protest at the archdiocesan chancery between noon and 3 p.m. each day during Lent".“We are at loggerheads because many groups within the church have adopted a kind of adversarial [approach]." Such a mindset, says Zizik, is appropriate for a justice system, not a Catholic faith community.

In her 2011 book Faithful Revolution: How Voice of the Faithful Is Changing the Church, Tricia Colleen Bruce, Ph.D., Associate Professor of Sociology at Maryville College in Maryville, Tennessee, looked at the development of Voice of the Faithful and its efforts to advocate for internal change while being accepted as legitimately Catholic. Drawing on three years of field observation and interviews with VOTF founders, leaders, and participants, Bruce's book explores the nature of a religious movement operating within the confines of a larger institution, an example of what the author calls an intrainstitutional social movement. In the concluding section of her book, she writes, "VOTF gave Catholics a space to express outrage at the scandal along with frustration and hope for the contemporary, post-Vatican II Catholic Church."

== Demographics ==
In 2004, two years after its founding, a study conducted by Catholic University of America found that VOTF members "share a deep and highly involved commitment to their Church," The study also found that the majority of members were women, that a small minority had some experience of formation for priesthood or religious life, and that one third were retired. Composition of VOTF membership "leans heavily toward the Pre-Vatican II and Vatican II generations". A large percentage of VOTF members are not members of an affiliate but follow the movement on the internet. Many are active in their local parish community as serving on parish committees, as lectors, or extraordinary ministers of Holy Communion.
