= Mark Flannery =

American economist

Mark Jeffrey Flannery is an American economist, since 2024 the Bank of America Eminent Scholar professor emeritus at the Warrington College of Business at the University of Florida. From 2000 to 2005, he was the Editor of the Journal of Money, Credit and Banking. From 2014 to 2016, Flannery was Director of the U.S. Securities and Exchange Commission's Division of Economic and Risk Analysis.

Flannery received his BA from Princeton University in 1972 and his PhD in economics from Yale University in 1978. Before joining the University of Florida in 1989, he was a faculty member at the University of Pennsylvania's Wharton School and the University of North Carolina's Business School. He has also held visiting positions at a number of universities, and was a Resident Scholar in 2009-2010 and a Visiting Scholar in 2013–2014 at the New York Federal Reserve Bank Research Department. He has also served on a part-time basis as co-director of the FDIC Center for Financial Research. Flannery was elected President of the Financial Management Association, serving in 2003–2004, and was President of the Financial Intermediation Research Society in 2008–2010.

Publications

Although best known as a banking scholar, Flannery has published articles on other topics. His most cited article is "Partial Adjustment Toward Target Capital Structure" (with Kasturi Rangan), published in the 2006 Journal of Financial Economics. In total, Flannery has over 24,000 citations on Google Scholar.

Flannery was an early proponent of contingent convertible bonds, known as cocos, for financial institutions. In 2005, before the 2008 financial crisis, he published a book chapter discussing the advantages of this type of security. Cocos, which are used in Europe but not in the U.S., are convertible bonds that automatically convert into equity, and thus increase the amount of equity capital and reduce the amount of debt, if a bank finds itself in financial distress. The rationale for cocos is that the equityholders of a bank that finds itself in financial distress may not want the bank to issue more equity, because the increased equity will benefit bondholders and government insurance funds, transferring wealth from existing stockholders. This unwillingness to issue equity when there would be a wealth transfer away from existing shareholders is known as the "debt overhang" problem. By raising cash via a coco issuance, the bank places itself in a situation where if it does get into financial distress, the cocos will convert into equity, and thus reduce the amount of debt, possibly avoiding a default or government bailout.

== Bibliography ==
- Mark J. Flannery (2010). The 2007-09 Financial Crisis and Bank Opaqueness. Federal Reserve Bank of San Francisco.
- Mark J. Flannery; Dwight M. Jaffee (1973). The economic implications of an electronic monetary transfer system. Lexington Books. ISBN 978-0-669-84806-9. OCLC 572780.
