= Frank Flannery =

Irish political consultant

Director of Organisation and Strategy
- In office 2002–2014

Personal details
- Party: Fine Gael

Frank Flannery (born 04/12/1944) is an Irish political consultant and Fine Gael's former Director of Organisations and Strategy.

== Early career ==
Born and raised in Kiltullagh in County Galway, he studied at University College Galway, where he joined Fine Gael. He served as president of Aontas na Mac Léinn in Éirinn (AMLÉ), formerly the Union of Students in Ireland (USI) between 1971 and 1972. Her then went on to complete an MBA in University College Dublin in 1978. After he finished his studies, he worked for The Rehab Group, a non-governmental organisation, involved with providing care and education for people with disabilities. He became chief executive officer of the group in 1981. He retired from the position in 2006.

== Fine Gael ==
Originally working as an activist within Fine Gael, he became one of Garret FitzGerald's handlers and chief strategists during the three elections between 1981 and 1982.

In the aftermath of the 2002 general election, which was a disastrous election for Fine Gael, he authored the Flannery Report which proposed a series of changes in the organisation and structure of the party. In 2002 he was made Fine Gael's director of Organisation and Strategy and was charged with implementing the report. The restructuring bore fruit for Fine Gael in the 2004 local elections and the 2007 general election, both of which saw gains for Fine Gael.

He served as National Director of Elections for Fine Gael in the 2009 local elections, which resulted in the party becoming the largest party of local government for the first time in its history. In June 2009 in the run up to the European and local elections, he caused controversy when he stated that Fine Gael would be willing to take part in a coalition government which would include Sinn Féin in order put Fianna Fáil out of government, a comment which was criticised within the party and led to his temporary demotion by party leader Enda Kenny.

== Controversy ==
In March 2014, Flannery confirmed his departure from his role as director of elections with Fine Gael, amid the fallout from the controversy about salaries at the Rehab Group in which he was a director before also leaving this role. At the height of the Rehab controversy, it emerged that he had received payments of more than €409,000 from Rehab for consultancy work which included political lobbying on their behalf when he was a part of Fine Gael hierarchy. He declined to appear before the Public Accounts Committee to discuss the payments.

His name also appeared in the Panama Papers as having used the services of an offshore law office. He facilitated meetings between the Fine Gael government and Richard Barrett's Bartra property-development/investment company, a firm through which the Chinese government arranges some of its overseas activities. He denied any wrongdoing.

== Personal life ==
Frank Flannery is the brother of the priest Tony Flannery.
