= Hubert H. Humphrey Building =

Office building in Washington, D.C.

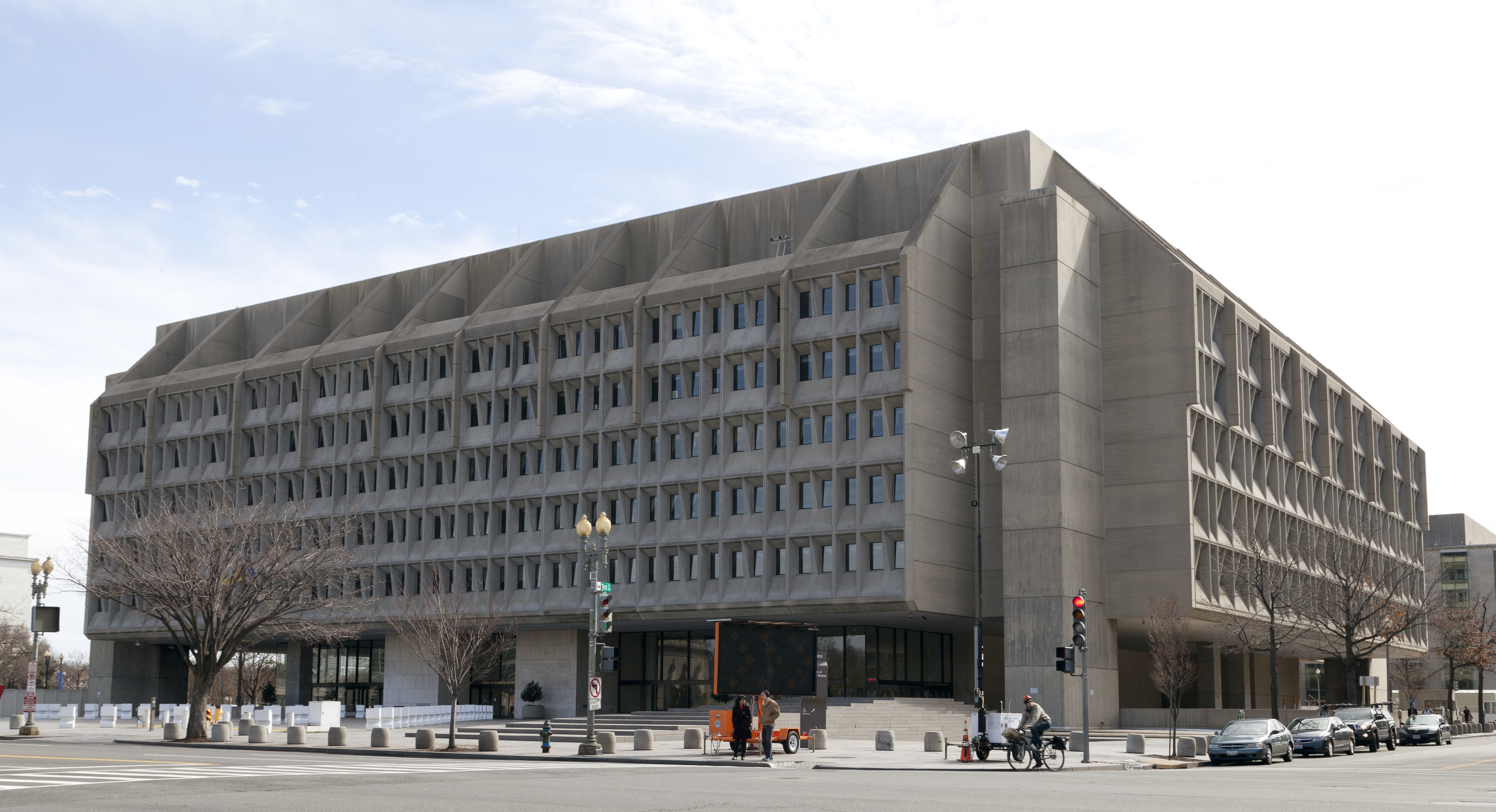
- Seen in 2012

- Location within Central Washington, D.C.
- Former names: South Portal Building
- Alternative names: United States Department of Health and Human Services headquarters building

General information
- Type: Government office building
- Architectural style: Postmodern, brutalist
- Location: 200 Independence Avenue SW, Washington, D.C., United States
- Coordinates: 38°53′12″N 77°0′52″W
- Named for: Hubert H. Humphrey
- Construction started: May 1972
- Completed: November 1, 1977
- Owner: United States General Services Administration

Technical details
- Material: Steel and precast concrete
- Floor count: 8

Design and construction
- Architect: Marcel Breuer
- Main contractor: Hass & Haynie, Blake Construction Company (joint venture)

Website
- GSA.gov
- Hubert H. Humphrey Building
- U.S. National Register of Historic Places
- NRHP reference No.: 100010786
- Added to NRHP: September 12, 2024

The Hubert H. Humphrey Building (originally the South Portal Building) is the headquarters of the United States Department of Health and Human Services (HHS), located at 200 Independence Avenue SW in Southwest Washington, D.C., United States. The eight-story office building, owned by the U.S. federal government, was built by the General Services Administration as the headquarters of the United States Department of Health, Education, and Welfare (HEW). It was completed in 1977 and designed by Marcel Breuer in the brutalist style. The building is one of two that Breuer designed for the U.S. federal government in the District of Columbia, along with the Robert C. Weaver Federal Building, and is listed on the National Register of Historic Places.

Planning for a generic federal structure on the site began in the mid-1960s, and HEW secretary Wilbur J. Cohen decided to move the department's executive offices there. Construction began in May 1972 after several changes to plans. The Hubert H. Humphrey Building was dedicated on November 1, 1977, in honor of former U.S. vice president and sitting U.S. senator Hubert H. Humphrey. After the HEW's education component was given to the newly created United States Department of Education in 1979, the HHS continued to occupy the structure.

The design of the building was influenced by its location above a sewage line, the Third Street highway tunnel, and adjoining air ducts. The Humphrey Building is set back significantly from Independence Avenue, and there is a large concrete plaza outside. The lowest two floors are set back from the upper stories, which are suspended from steel trusses above. The facade is composed of travertine, along with cast-in-place and precast concrete. The ground floor has spaces such as a lobby, exhibition space, and an auditorium, and there are additional amenity areas on the second floor. There are also three basements. The interiors are broken up by the main support columns and three cores, which contain elevators and other essential infrastructure. The third through seventh stories are mostly identical in layout, except for the sixth floor, which has the HHS secretary's suite. The interior walls were prefabricated with infrastructure such as wiring and piping. Meeting, office, and dining facilities occupy the penthouse level of the building, which is surrounded by a balcony. Commentary on the design has been mixed.

== Site ==
The Hubert H. Humphrey Building is located at 200 Independence Avenue SW in the Southwest section of Washington, D.C., United States. It occupies a 1.25-acre (0.51 ha) site bounded clockwise from the north by Independence Avenue and 2nd, C, and 3rd streets SW. The structure faces the National Mall, a landscaped park, directly to the north. The adjacent blocks include the United States Botanic Garden to the northeast, the American Veterans Disabled for Life Memorial to the east, the O'Neill House Office Building to the south, the Mary E. Switzer Memorial Building to the southwest, the Wilbur J. Cohen Federal Building to the west, and the National Museum of the American Indian to the northwest. It is located near the Washington Metro's Federal Center SW station.

The Humphrey Building is placed above a major sewage line, the Third Street highway tunnel, and air ducts that serve the tunnel. As such, the building essentially functions like a bridge above the sewer and tunnel, which run under two-thirds of the site. The sewer and tunnel run diagonally under the site, in contrast to the Frances Perkins Building at the Third Street Tunnel's northern end, where the highway runs parallel to that building. The building's plaza incorporates grilles from the tunnel, and the building itself had to include ventilation towers. The design was further constrained because, while the ducts had to rise at least 60 feet (18 m), any structure on the site had a height restriction of 90 feet (27 m).

=== Previous site use ===
During the 19th century, the surrounding area had been isolated from the rest of D.C. by the Washington City Canal to the north. After the canal was infilled in the 1870s, the Humphrey Building's site was developed with houses and tolley depots. The northeast corner of the site was cut off by Canal Street, which ran diagonally to the District of Columbia's street grid. When Independence Avenue and C Street SW were widened in 1941, the site assumed its final pentagonal shape.

In 1946, the United States Congress had passed the District of Columbia Redevelopment Act, which established the District of Columbia Redevelopment Land Agency and provided for clearance of land and redevelopment funds in the capital. After a decade of public comment and negotiations, the Southwest Urban Renewal Plan was approved in November 1956. In part, the plan cleared the way for General Services Administration (GSA) to build new large federal office buildings between Independence Avenue SW and Southeast Freeway, along with mid-rise apartment buildings in the same area.

== History ==
=== Development ===
The Humphrey Building was the last of six federal office buildings built as part of the Southwest redevelopment, in part due to issues regarding its site and tenant. By the 1960s, the Third Street Tunnel was being built under the National Mall, but its construction was repeatedly delayed. To alleviate opposition to the tunnel's existence, the Humphrey Building was supposed to be built atop the tunnel's south portal; the United States Department of Labor building would be built at the north portal. The south portal site was intended as the headquarters of the United States Department of Health, Education and Welfare (HEW). The agency, which at the time occupied a site near the United States Capitol, had grown substantially in scope as a result of President Lyndon B. Johnson's Great Society initiatives.

Funding for a HEW building had been allocated in the 1959 Public Buildings Act. In 1962, President John F. Kennedy established the Ad Hoc Committee on Federal Office Space and charged it with developing new guidelines for the design of federal office buildings. On May 23 of that year, the Ad Hoc Committee issued a one-page report, Guiding Principles for Federal Architecture, which established these new design principles. The document encouraged federal planners to consider and build structures that "reflect the dignity, enterprise, vigor and stability of the American National Government" and "embody the finest contemporary American architectural thought." At the time, few new federal buildings in Washington, D.C., were being designed in neoclassical styles, but neither were architecturally distinctive, contemporary-styled federal buildings being built. Kennedy issued a directive based on the Guiding Principles report that June.

==== Planning ====
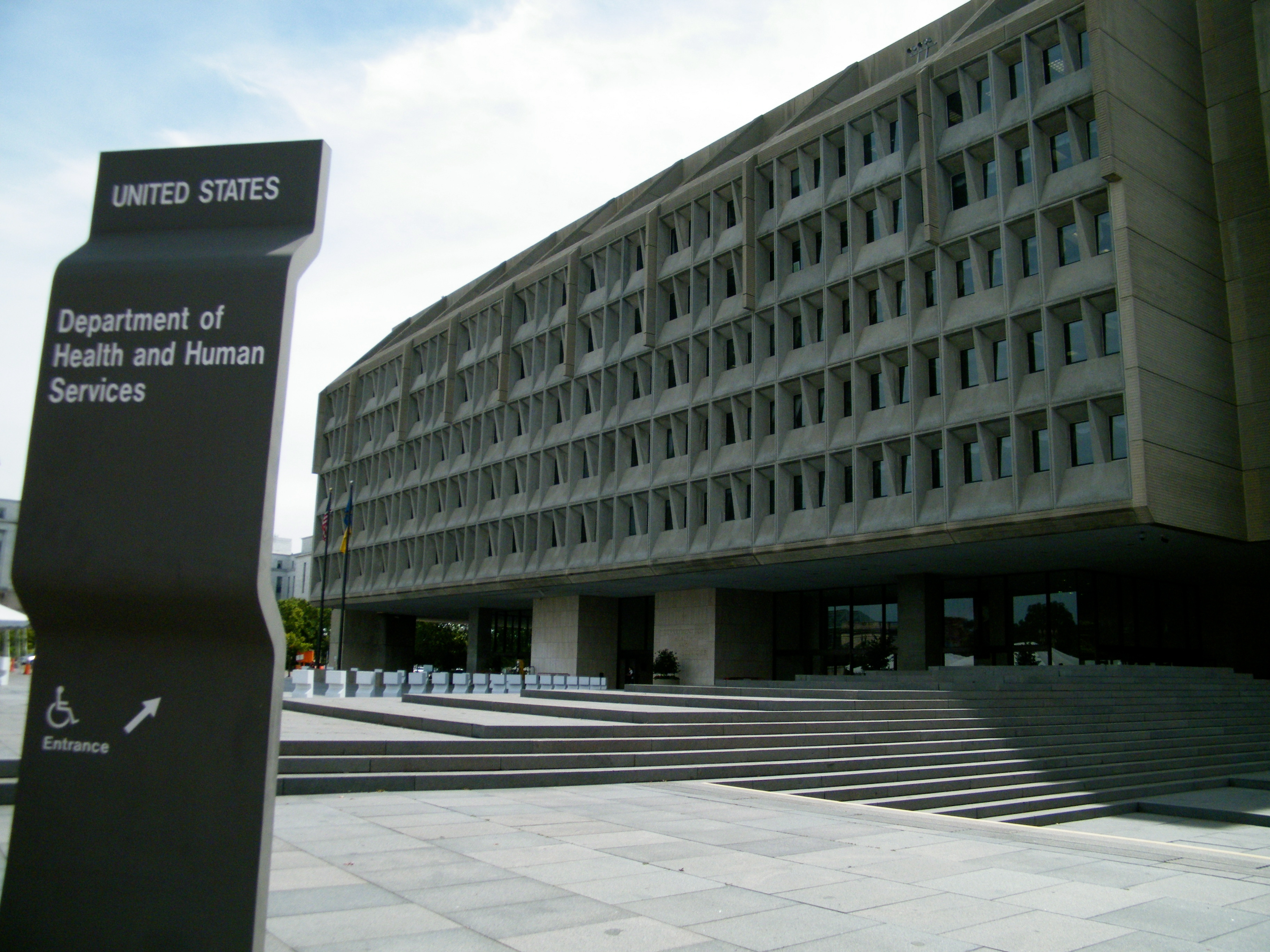
Signage outside the building

Planning for a generic federal structure on the site began about 1965 or 1966. Marcel Breuer, his associate Herbert Beckhard, and Nolan-Swinburne & Associates received a contract for a feasibility study of the building—known tentatively as the "Air Rights Building" for its location—on March 28, 1966. The three had previously designed a nearby headquarters building for the United States Department of Housing and Urban Development, which would be completed in 1968 for substantially less than its budget. Breuer received the commission for the Air Rights Building after positive reception to the HUD design. The site immediately posed difficulties because of its location above the highway and sewage line. As a result, unlike traditional buildings, most of the Air Rights Building could not be supported from directly underneath. Breuer's initial drawings, published in August 1966, vaguely resembled the final design. The plans called for a concrete building with the two lower stories recessed from the five upper stories, which would have stair towers at each corner. There would have been two interior lightwells.

In early 1967, the GSA requested $1 million in Congressional funds for the Air Rights Building's substructure, which were approved that May. Two federal agencies, the National Capital Planning Commission (NCPC) and the United States Commission of Fine Arts (CFA), approved the design in mid-1967. The Architect of the Capitol's (AOC) office rejected the plans, requiring that the building be set back from Independence Avenue to avoid obstructing views of the Rayburn House Office Building to the east. A new design contract for the "South Portal Building" on the same site was signed in December 1967, and the NCPC, CFA, and AOC approved the revised plans over the next two years. The original design was largely retained, but the building was placed further back from Independence Avenue, requiring multiple changes. Breuer designed a public plaza on Independence Avenue, repositioned the vehicular entrance, and removed the two planned lightwells from the interior.

Initially, the South Portal Building was budgeted at $29 million. No tenant was selected until HEW Secretary Wilbur J. Cohen agreed to move the department's offices there in December 1968. The department's existing building, later the Cohen Building, (Note: The structure known as the Cohen Building, at 300 Independence Avenue SW, was given that name in 1988, more than three decades after HEW moved in.) had 5,000 workers. The GSA wrote to the architects in September 1969, recommending several design changes to reduce the rapidly growing construction estimates. Cohen's successor, Robert H. Finch, announced the next month that he would postpone development of the new HEW building, as the cost had increased to $40.5 million. Despite this, the architects had drawn up the final plans by April 1970, and Breuer, Beckhard, and the GSA began designing the interiors. The GSA was responsible for most of the interior spaces, but Breuer and Beckhard were assigned some of the larger spaces (such as the lobby, auditorium, and conference rooms) in their original design contract.

==== Construction ====
Foundation work commenced in December 1969, Congress approved the building's construction sometime in 1970, and the construction documents were approved that October. After a joint venture between Hass & Haynie and Blake Construction Company received the general contract in April 1972, construction began early the next month. The construction contract was awarded for 18% below official estimates, and Breuer was reportedly pleased at the cost savings compared with other federal government structures. Work on the building progressed relatively quickly: The first pieces of the concrete core were being poured by October 1972, and the facade was being installed within thirteen months. The steelwork and floor plates had largely been completed up to the seventh-story level by early 1974, when the GSA proposed that parts of the interior scheme be modified in February.

The building's completion date was postponed to August 1975 and later to September 1976. During the construction, there were plans to build a sauna and some squash courts inside, to the consternation of Congress members. As such, in 1975, Congress proposed to take over the building and use it for office space for the United States House of Representatives. At the time, the building was estimated to cost $43.4 million, and the House's 10,000 staff were working in overcrowded offices. The Congressional takeover did not occur, and some House offices were ultimately moved to House Annex 2, a nearby building formerly occupied by the Federal Bureau of Investigation.

Multiple artworks were also commissioned under the GSA's Art in Architecture program. Following a 1974 congressional bill that authorized a major piece of public art to be placed at the south entrance to the Humphrey Building, Beckhard first proposed incorporating artwork in the building's design that December. No action was taken for nearly a year, when the National Endowment for the Arts (NEA) appointed trustees to review proposed artworks for the building, and a committee was established in 1976 to select art for the building and its plaza. Initially, Beckhard proposed a lobby sculpture, but the plans were revised when the original $172,000 art allocation was cut to $129,000; if the remaining funding were not spent before September 30, 1976, that allocation would also be eliminated. These time constraints prompted the NEA panelists to select three tapestries and one sculpture, all of which were either under design or already completed; these sculptures were selected on September 20, ten days before the appropriation was to expire. Ultimately, the HEW building was one of two federal structures to receive GSA funding for artwork during the 1977 fiscal year.

=== Usage ===
==== 1970s ====
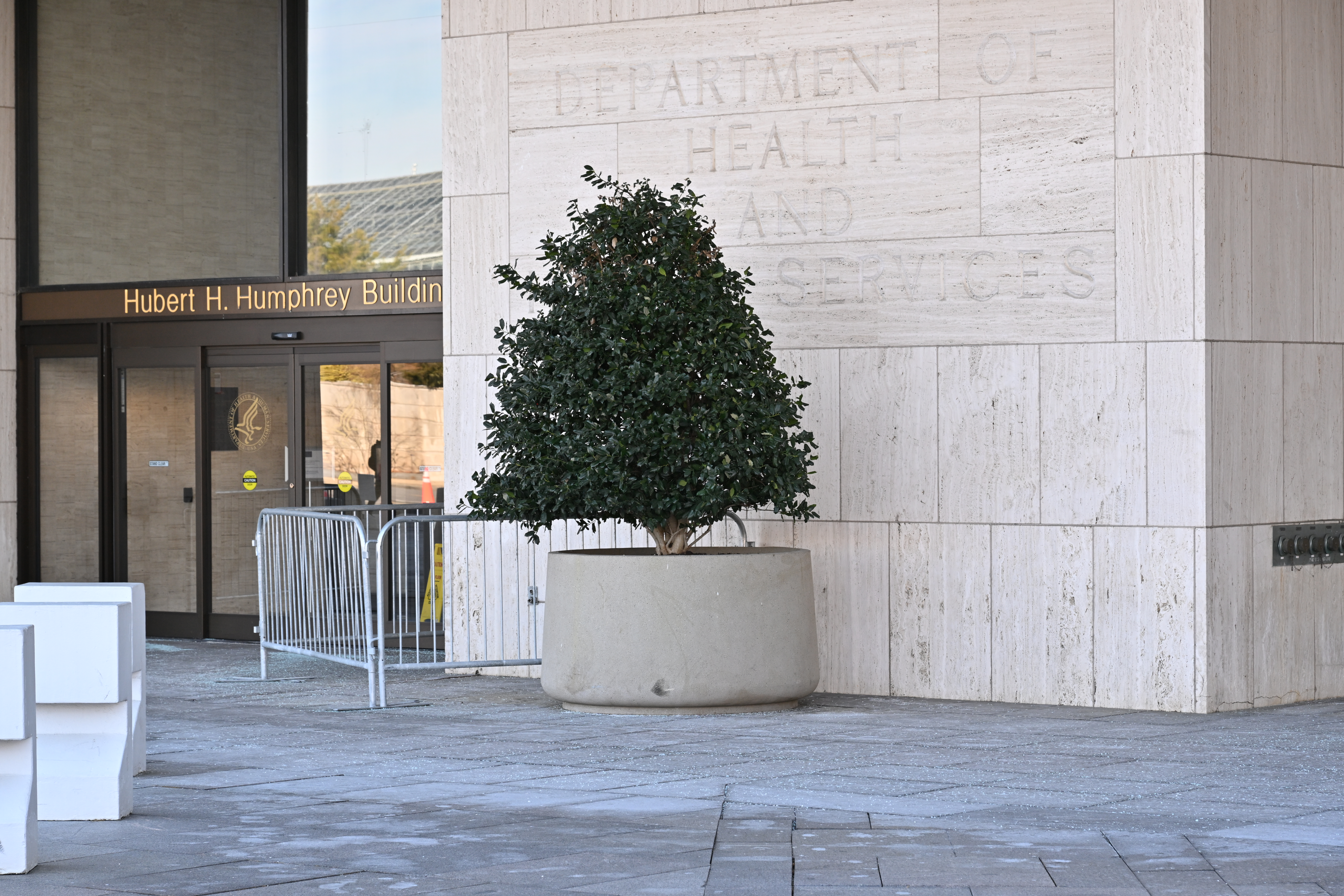
The main entrance, with Humphrey's name over the door at left

HEW's executive officers began moving into the new HEW building in September 1976, though the agency retained offices in the Cohen Building. The HEW headquarters and the J. Edgar Hoover Building were the newest federal buildings in Washington, D.C., for more than a decade, when the Environmental Protection Agency built a facility along the Anacostia River. As the HEW building was being completed, one of the welds connecting the hanging interior walls to the roof truss cracked in April 1977, causing the roof to sag 19 inches (48 cm). Two hundred or three hundred workers had to be evacuated from the upper stories while the beam was pulled back into position and rewelded into place. That July, two tapestries by Breuer and Jan Yoors were installed in the lobby; a contemporary source wrote that they added color to the otherwise-dull space. The concrete work on the structure was poor in some places, and softball-sized chunks of concrete came loose shortly before the building was dedicated.

The idea of renaming the building for Hubert H. Humphrey, the former U.S. vice president and then-current U.S. Senator from Minnesota, was introduced by his Senate colleague, Bob Dole of Kansas. The bill was introduced in the Senate on October 3, 1977; every U.S. Senator except Humphrey cosponsored the bill, which passed. The House of Representatives then passed the bill on October 13, and President Jimmy Carter signed it on October 23. Carter supported renaming the building, citing Humphrey's role in helping underprivileged Americans. The HEW building was dedicated as the Hubert H. Humphrey Building on November 1, 1977. It was the first time a federal building had been named for a living person, although at that time it was publicly known that Humphrey was terminally ill with cancer. Humphrey died on January 13, 1978, just seventy-five days after the dedication.

When the building opened, the GSA placed 25 tropical plants inside, which were part of the building's interior design, and a portrait of Humphrey by Charles Levitan was temporarily lent to the HHS and displayed inside the building. The lobby was also used as an art exhibition area, and the cafeteria on the penthouse level was open to visitors and served breakfast and lunch. At the outset, the building lacked some energy-saving features such as a central climate control system, and HEW Secretary Joseph A. Califano Jr. had a private air-conditioning unit installed in his office for $10,000. Disabled occupants reported that the design had several inaccessible features, including payphones that were placed too high and a gymnasium that could be reached only by taking several elevators. In 1979, HEW's Architectural and Transportation Barriers Compliance Board ordered that parts of the interior be modified to allow handicapped access. These modifications cost $200,000. The board also requested that HEW install an accessible passenger elevator, which the agency refused due to high costs; instead, the existing freight elevators were retrofitted to accommodate handicapped passengers.

==== 1980s and 1990s ====
HEW became the United States Department of Health and Human Services (HHS) in 1980, after Congress passed the Department of Education Organization Act to create the separate Department of Education. As such, some signage on the building had to be replaced. When Ronald Reagan became president in 1981, his administration refused to buy Levitan's portrait of Humphrey. Some of Humphrey's friends and family raised $3,000 to acquire the portrait, which was dedicated there the next year. The GSA was considering "cooperative uses" for the Humphrey Building by 1983, seeking a private partner to potentially adapt some of the space for other purposes, including commercial or cultural use. The HHS also expanded the building's telephone banks that year after setting up a hotline for HIV/AIDS-related queries.

The diplomat Joseph J. Jova and Humphrey's sister Frances commissioned the sculptor Gabriel Ponzanelli to create a bronze bust of Humphrey. This bust was dedicated in 1985 and subsequently installed in the Humphrey Building. After several of the building's workers developed hypersensitivity pneumonitis the mid-1980s, NIOSH inspectors found that the building's cafeteria was leaking grease onto workers' desks and sickening them. The building gained a reputation for being one of the "sickest buildings in the country", as The Washington Post described it in a 1988 article, due to its high levels of indoor pollution.

The GSA announced plans for a play area at the Humphrey Building in 1990. Early the same decade, Senator Ted Kennedy also proposed moving the collection of the National Museum of Health and Medicine to the eastern portion of the Humphrey Building's plaza, but he never introduced a Senate bill to allow this relocation. The National Institute for Occupational Safety and Health (NIOSH) moved some of its offices into the building in April 1994. The same year, the Social Security Administration (SSA), until then part of the HHS, was converted into an independent federal government agency, and SSA officials were relocated out of the Humphrey Building. A government contractor replaced the Humphrey Building's rooftop chiller during the 1990s. Vehicle barriers were installed around the building later that decade, and the GSA proposed limiting parking on the surrounding block as part of an increase to federal building security following the 1995 Oklahoma City bombing.

==== 2000s to present ====
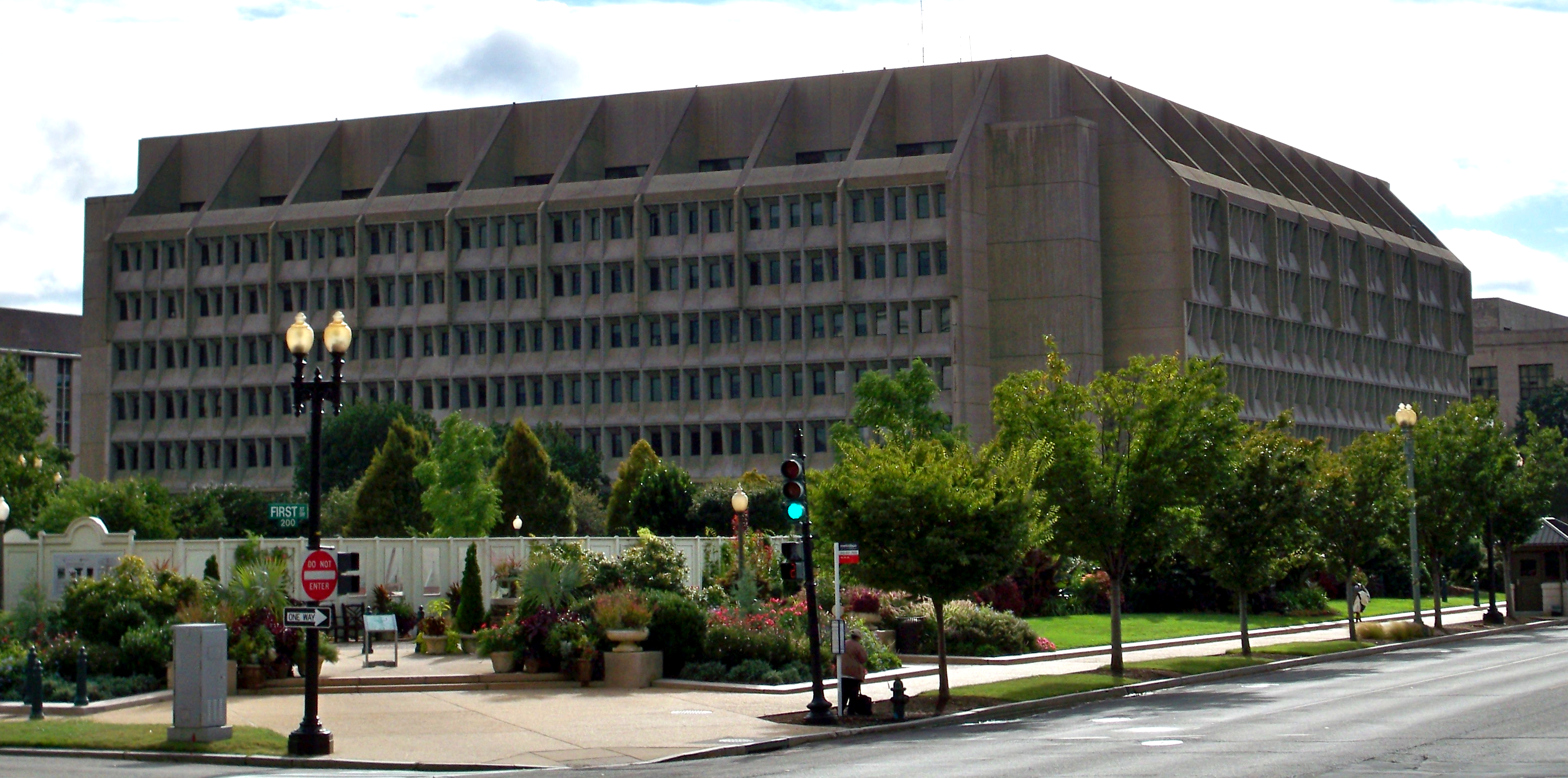
The building as seen from the northeast

The building remains HHS's headquarters in the 21st century, though the interiors have been reconfigured over the years. A portrait of Humphrey was dedicated by outgoing HHS Secretary Donna Shalala in 2001. Her successor, Tommy G. Thompson, built a command center on the sixth floor across from his office, taking space that had formerly been occupied by an auditorium. The command center was constructed partially in response to terrorism and health threats such as the September 11 attacks and the anthrax attacks in 2001. The command center took 59 days to construct and was dedicated in December 2002 at a cost of either $3.5 million or $3.7 million. After the command center was completed, it was used to monitor health threats and host simulations of responses to bioterrorism attacks.

By the mid-2000s, the Office of the National Coordinator for Health Information Technology had been relocated to the Humphrey Building's fifth floor. The headquarters of the Centers for Medicare & Medicaid Services were also situated there. In April 2014, the GSA announced that it would spend $6.7 million to renovate the Humphrey Building. The modifications, which would create open workspace, would allow the Office of the Chief Information Officer to move into the structure. The next year, the CFA approved plans for new signage at the building. The GSA proposed appropriating $20.4 million for fire alarm upgrades in 2022 as part of a larger $81.1 million project, which was approved by a U.S. House committee that year. By that time, HHS staffers complained that the building had pest infestations, were confusing to navigate, and was decorated inconsistently. When the Administration for Strategic Preparedness and Response was elevated to a federal agency in 2022, it was also headquartered at the Humphrey Building.

The District of Columbia Historic Preservation Review Board designated the Hubert H. Humphrey Building as a city historic landmark in July 2024, following a request from the GSA. It was subsequently added to the National Register of Historic Places on September 12, 2024. During the second presidency of Donald Trump, the GSA announced plans to list the building for sale in March 2025 before withdrawing that proposal. That June, U.S. Senator Joni Ernst introduced the FOR SALE Act, proposing that the Humphrey Building and five other federal structures be sold off. The CFA approved plans later the same year for modifications to the building's rooftop antennas.

== Architecture ==
The Hubert H. Humphrey Building was primarily designed by Marcel Breuer in the brutalist style. It was one of Breuer's final designs, as he retired from his architectural practice in 1976. The Humphrey Building is also the second of Breuer's two designs in Washington, D.C., after the Robert C. Weaver Federal Building, Herbert Beckhard and Nolen-Swinburne & Associates assisted with the design, having previously collaborated with him in the design of the Weaver Building. In addition, the Humphrey Building includes multiple works of art, since Breuer had preferred to incorporate visual art in his buildings. Breuer, Annette Kaplan, James Rosati, and Jan Yoors were commissioned to design the building's original artworks, including tapestries and sculptures.

The Humphrey Building was one of nine brutalist federal government buildings constructed in Southwest Washington, D.C., in the third quarter of the 20th century. When it opened, Breuer's office issued a fact sheet calling it "a large building which still maintains a human scale".

=== Form ===
The Humphrey Building has a rectangular floor plan measuring 340 by 310 feet (104 by 94 m) across. It has eight above-ground stories including a set-back penthouse; the upper stories are cantilevered outward above the two lowest stories. There are recessed stair towers at each corner of the upper stories, which extend to the ground as free-standing structures. Near the building's roof are 25-foot-thick (7.6 m) trusses, which extend outward, tapering at the building's perimeter. The trusses are sloped at a 45-degree angle to conform to height restrictions. The walls and floors hang from these trusses in a similar manner to Breuer's earlier Armstrong Rubber Building in New Haven, Connecticut. The trusses are supported by 28 columns, including the stair towers at the corners.

==== Plaza ====
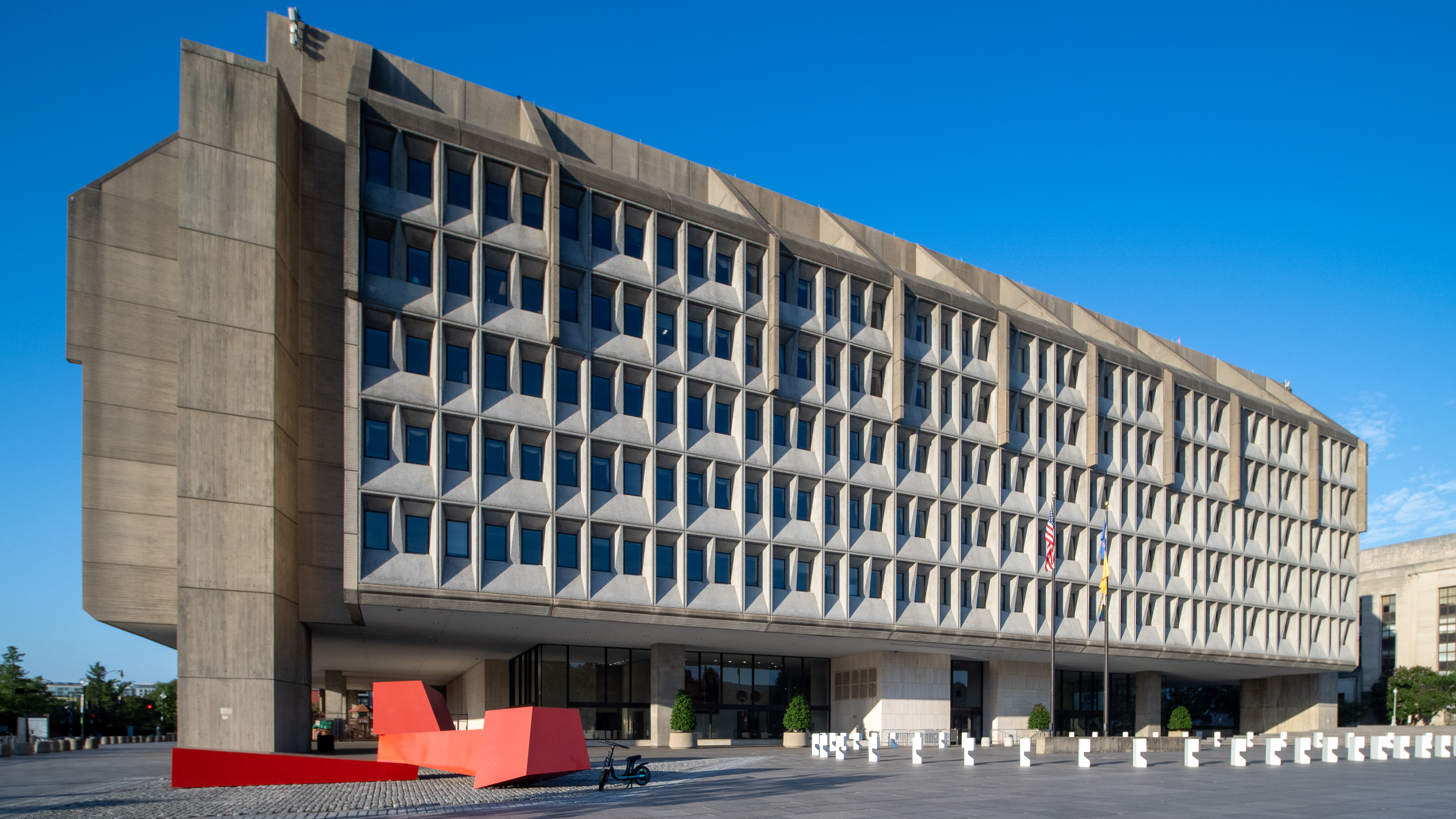
The building's north elevation as seen from the plaza

There is a large concrete plaza outside the building. Spanning 1.1 acres (0.45 ha), it surrounds the building on all sides except the southern, and it continues underneath the cantilevered upper stories. The building is set back about 135 feet (41 m) or 138 feet (42 m) from Independence Avenue to address the Architect of the Capitol's objections to the original plans. The plaza is surrounded by short, cylindrical concrete bollards and is paved in dark-gray granite slabs. There is a seating area at the northwestern corner, which is made of concrete and is partially underneath the cantilevered upper floors. This seating area steps downward at its western (3rd Street) end and upward at its southeastern end. At the center of the plaza's northern elevation is a concrete parapet with two flagpoles. Short, rectangular concrete lampposts flank a driveway that travels under the upper floors. Breuer included granite decorative effects, which were intended as hardscaping.

On 3rd Street SW to the west, there is a curb cut, leading to a ramp that descends to the parking garage. This ramp measures 15 feet (4.6 m) wide and has a parking attendant's shelter and concrete sidewalls. South of the building (on C Street SW), there are some trees on the sidewalk, in addition to a glass-and-steel security booth. Plants and trees could not be grown in the rest of the plaza due to its placement above the Third Street Tunnel. At the eastern end of the building, under the cantilever, are concrete benches and a play area. There is also a raised brick platform, which originally contained a planting bed.

Outside the northeast corner of the building is James Rosati's Heroic Shore Points I, an aluminum piece painted bright red, which was dedicated in 1977. This artwork measures 9 3/4 by 24 by 31 5/6 feet (3.0 by 7.3 by 9.7 m) across and is a larger-scale replica of a similar artwork that Rosati had created in 1968, Shore Points I. It consists of multiple rectangular and geometrical shapes stacked atop each other. Rosati helped personally install the artwork, which cost $64,000 (equivalent to $340,000 in 2025 (Note: 1634–1699: McCusker, J. J. (1997). How Much Is That in Real Money? A Historical Price Index for Use as a Deflator of Money Values in the Economy of the United States: Addenda et Corrigenda (PDF). American Antiquarian Society. 1700–1799: McCusker, J. J. (1992). How Much Is That in Real Money? A Historical Price Index for Use as a Deflator of Money Values in the Economy of the United States (PDF). American Antiquarian Society. 1800–present: Federal Reserve Bank of Minneapolis. "Consumer Price Index (estimate) 1800–".)). The sculpture was removed during a 2000 renovation and was not reinstalled for several years due to opposition from the HHS secretary at the time.

=== Facade ===
The facade is made of travertine, along with light-hued cast-in-place and darker-toned precast concrete. The stair towers, along with the columns on the north, east, and west elevations, are each made of cast-in-place concrete. This material is also used for the south elevation and the adjoining sections of the east and west elevations, while precast concrete is used in the rest of the facade. The facade is divided vertically into bays on the north elevation, 49 on the south elevation, and 45 on the west and east elevations. The cast-in-place concrete was poured into wooden formwork boards, creating vertical grooves at the stair towers and horizontal grooves elsewhere.

==== Lower stories ====
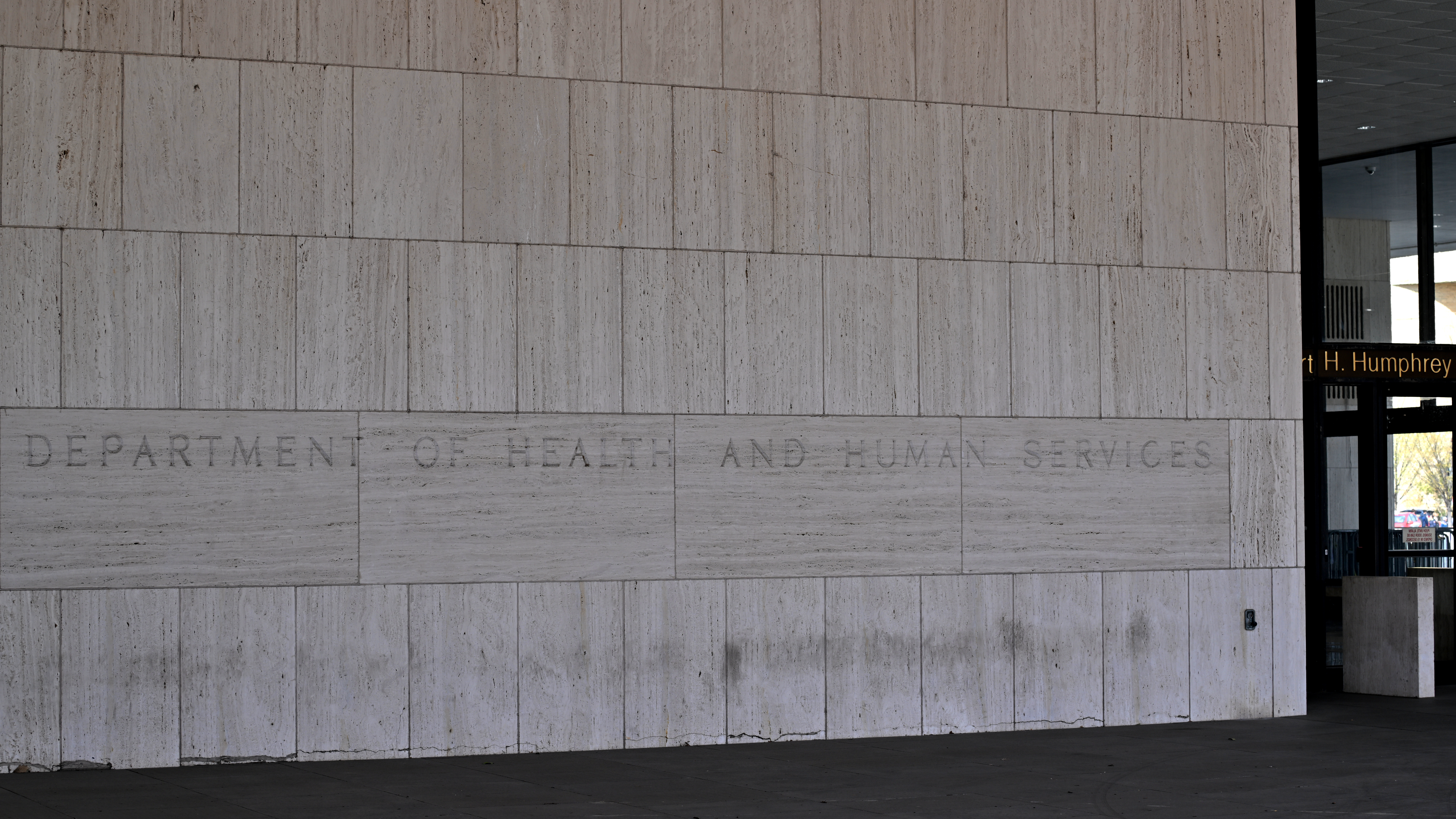
Wall outside the ground floor

The northern elevation of the lowest two stories contain full-height glass curtain walls, interspersed with enclosures that are clad in solid travertine; the glass walls surround the lobbies inside. The cantilevered portions are illuminated by lights in the soffit above the second floor (under the cantilevered upper stories). On the first story, there are two aluminum doorways in the inward-facing elevations of each stair tower. On the nearly identical west and east elevations, the northern portion also has full-height glass curtain walls, while the rest of these elevations have a travertine facade. The south elevation has an exposed concrete facade at basement level, alongside a loading dock to the east under the cantilevered upper stories to the east.

The lobby's main entrance on Independence Avenue faces north, although the other three elevations also have entrances. The building's name and the Department of Health and Human Services' name are displayed near several of the entrances. The main entrance, consisting of two sliding doors flanked by sidelights, is located between a pair of travertine columns with ventilation openings. A stone nearby bears the names of U.S. President Gerald R. Ford, GSA Administrator Arthur F. Sampson, and the year 1975. The east and west elevations have another entrance to the lobby near their respective northern ends, along with a steel service doorway near their respective southern ends. The south elevation has a double-door service entrance near its western end.

==== Upper stories ====
Precast concrete panels with thin granite veneers are used on the third to seventh floors, and there are two large windows in each panel. Each window opening consists of an immovable sash window with an aluminum frame, which is recessed into the facade. The windows are topped by sloping concrete brises soleil to reduce sunlight exposure. On the eighth floor, slanted trusses divide the facade at intervals of five bays. The roof itself is a flat gravel-and-concrete surface separated by the trusses atop the building.

=== Interior ===
In addition to the eight above-ground stories, there are three basement levels. The basements are utilitarian, with a parking garage, mechanical plant, and emergency shelter. The first floor was configured as a series of large spaces, and as such, it contains a lobby, exhibition space, and an auditorium. Because of the first floor's many double-height spaces, the second floor is smaller than any of the other above-ground stories. The third to seventh floors are generally used as offices, including the main office suite of the United States Secretary of Health and Human Services on the sixth floor. Above are the roof and penthouse, which are used for dining and as mechanical space. These spaces cover 803,555 square feet (74,652.7 m^{2}).

The internal steel superstructure, concealed by the facade cladding, acts like a bridge over the sewer and the Third Street Tunnel, suspended from the roof trusses. The configuration of the superstructure created large column-free spaces inside and allowed the outermost 30 feet (9.1 m) of each of the upper stories to be supported solely by the trusses. Structurally, the floor slabs are made of cellular steel decks.

The center of each floor is open space, broken up by the main support columns and three mechanical cores. A stair and five passenger elevators are each located in the northeast and northwest cores, while there are two freight elevators in the south core. On each floor, the passenger elevator lobbies have finishes such as acoustic tile ceilings and travertine floors; the walls are clad with square slate tiles measuring 8 inches (200 mm) across. The freight elevator lobbies have finishes including concrete walls, plaster ceilings, and concrete or vinyl-tile floors. Additional vertical circulation is through the stair towers at each corner. The stair towers typically contain concrete steps and walls, along with stainless steel rails, and connect the upper stories to ground level. The treads are carpeted in the northwestern tower (which continues to the basement) and covered with terrazzo in the other towers.

==== Lobby and vestibules ====
The first-floor lobby is accessed by a public vestibule to the north, which has a sliding door, and an employee vestibule to the west, which have two swinging aluminum doors. Both these vestibules have travertine floor tiles; glass-paneled exterior walls; and travertine side walls with heating grilles. The vestibules have acoustic ceiling tiles, which continue into the lobby itself.

The double-height T-shaped lobby, on the building's north side, has a west–east public section, along with a "great hall" with exhibition space to the south. The lobby floor is variously cited as being paved with terrazzo, travertine, or gray slate. The lobby has travertine walls, and the double-height ceiling is made of acoustic tiles with cylindrical lamps. The section nearest the north vestibule (at the intersection of the T) has a wooden check-in desk, a travertine guard's desk, and travertine benches. The guard's desk, to the east, abuts a telephone lobby with a travertine counter. To the west is a lobby for HHS secretary's private elevator, which contains a plaque commemorating the building's dedication, alongside a bust and plaque commemorating Hubert Humphrey. The south wall has elevators to the parking garage below. Floor plans from the building's construction labeled the west arm as a "library" and the east arm as "meeting rooms".

Breuer's Floating (1977)

There are two tapestries in the lobby. The first, Yoors's Symphony (1977), is a 144-by-180-inch (3,700 by 4,600 mm) collage of streaks and shapes. Costing $16,000, it is tinged in various shades of red, orange, blue, and purple was commissioned just before his death. The other is Marcel Breuer's Floating (1977), a 173-by-143-inch (4,400 by 3,600 mm) collage of rectangles, commissioned for $21,000. Consisting of red, yellow, blue, and gray shapes, Floating was specifically intended to complement the design of the travertine walls. Also in the main lobby is Happy Mother (1993), a bronze sculpture. The Happy Mother sculpture and the Floating tapestry are housed in the lobby's east arm.

There are doorways at the southeast and southwest corners of the T-shaped floor plan, which lead to the passenger elevator lobbies. These contain cabinets, chairs, and signage. The eastern elevator lobby also has the Symphony tapestry, a portrait of Humphrey, and the Great Seal of the United States in bronze. A second-story overpass crosses the great hall just south of the public areas, and there are concrete columns next to the overpass. The rest of the great hall is used for exhibits and has a temporary stage, movable furniture, and portraits of past HEW and HHS secretaries on the walls.

==== Other lower-story spaces ====
East of the great hall is the auditorium, a double-height rectangular room reached from the eastern elevator lobby, with carpeted, acoustic-plaster, and wood finishes. From north to south, it contains a projection booth, rows of seats facing a stage, and two rooms for a recording studio. To the west of the great hall are offices (originally a store) and an adjoining daycare center, whose finishes have been replaced over the years. These spaces are connected by a west–east passageway at the first floor's southern end, which have glass-and-steel doors leading outside at either end. South of this passageway are various service areas, offices, and closets. The lower floor of a two-story fitness center occupies the west end of this space.

The second-story spaces are connected by an overpass, which is made of concrete and tapers at its center. This overpass leads to passenger elevator lobbies on either side. The lobby on the west side abuts a credit union and the upper portion of the fitness center, while the lobby to the east adjoins a health clinic. The south end of the second story has a projection booth. In general, the second-floor rooms have acoustic ceiling tiles, plaster walls, and carpets, while the overpass has a terrazzo floor.

Within the three basements, the parking garage extends to all sides of the building except the eastern. The garage has utilitarian concrete finishes and is accessed from the Third Street SW entrance ramp, along with the freight elevators, the HHS secretary's private elevator, and several staircases. The third basement level houses the emergency shelter, while the first basement's southern end contains a tunnel to the Cohen Federal Building on the west.

==== Third to seventh stories ====
The third through seventh stories have identical layouts (except at the sixth story), with offices at the perimeter being connected by circulation corridors. The corridors have carpeted floors, gypsum-board walls with directory boards, and acoustic ceiling tiles. On these stories, the northwest and northeast cores flank a conference room. The executive suites on the north side of each floor have offices with built-in furniture; restrooms; a conference room; and a reception room. These spaces have finishes such as teak, cloth, and fabric.

The sixth floor contains the HHS secretary's suite, which takes up much of the north and east sides of that story, as well as the space between the passenger elevator cores. The secretary's suite contains a dining room, kitchen, emergency operation center, and multiple conference rooms, in addition to the rooms found in the executive suites. The finishes in the secretary's suite include carpets, travertine and wood walls, built-in furniture, and acoustic ceilings. An emergency command center, spanning 5,600 square feet (520 m^{2}), is next to the secretary's suite. The command center has separate ventilation systems from the rest of the building, a backup power generator, and large television screens. The center has a computerized communication and surveillance system similar to that at the World Health Organization's emergency command center, which the HHS subsequently helped develop.

The remaining offices on the third to seventh stories are divided into a grid of square modules measuring 5 1/6 feet (1.6 m) wide; in early plans, the modules were supposed to be 3 feet (0.91 m) wide. In general, the offices have finishes such as acoustic tiles, carpeting, and wood paneling. The prefabricated walls contain embedded electrical wiring, HVAC, and plumbing, and other essential infrastructure. The use of prefabricated modules reduced the cost from $40 million to $30 million, and it allowed the interiors to be reconfigured without the need to completely reconfigure the electrical or mechanical systems. The circulation corridors surround additional work areas, which were built as open plan spaces with half-height partitions. By the 1990s, permanent floor-to-ceiling partitions had been added.

==== Penthouse ====
The penthouse has dining facilities, meeting rooms, offices, restrooms. and mechanical spaces. These spaces are located at the roof's northern end, surrounded by an outdoor balcony. At the center of the penthouse is Kaplan's Evolutionary Notes to WK (1976), a 7-by-23-foot (2.1 by 7.0 m) tapestry depicting a tan-and-black landscape, which was commissioned for $7,000. Kaplan's tapestry was manufactured in three sections and was woven in such a way that the colors were also visible from the back. The conference room at the penthouse's northwest corner and the offices at the northeast corner have carpets, plaster walls, half-height partitions, and acoustic ceilings. To the south are the dining facilities, which have gypsum walls and carpeted or vinyl tile floors. The dining area has a white ceiling and a wall overlooking several congressional office buildings.

== Impact ==
=== Reception ===
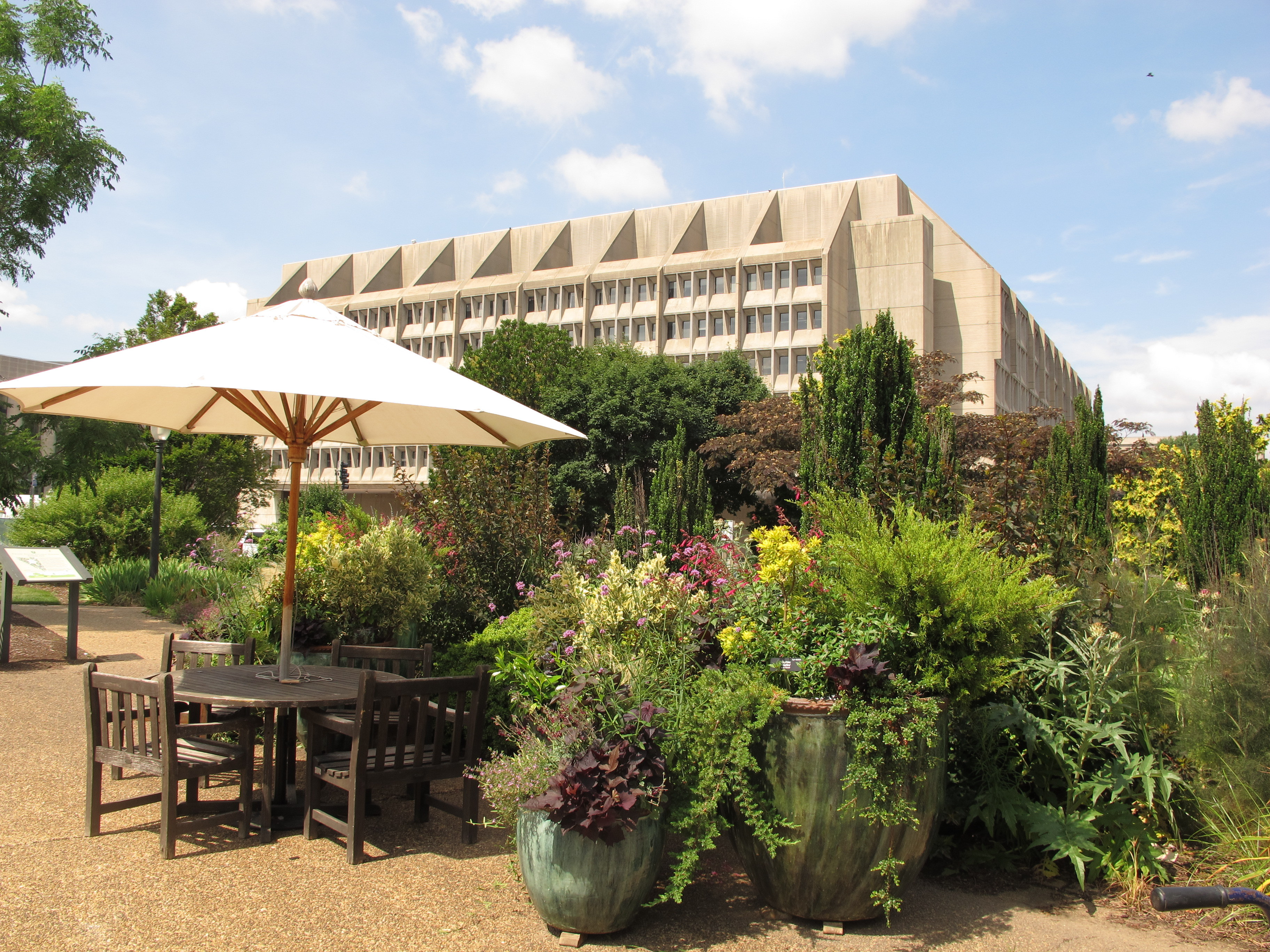
Seen from the U.S. Botanic Garden

The writer Isabelle Hyman said that the "structural innovations and creative technology" of both the Weaver and Humphrey buildings received frequent praise from architects. When the plans were first announced in 1972, Wolf Von Eckardt of The Washington Post lauded the building's structural design as "ingenious". Benjamin Forgey of The Washington Star wrote in 1975 that the building's style differed both from previous modernist designs such as the Department of Labor building, which he saw as "faceless", and from neoclassical designs such as the Rayburn Building, which he saw as corruptions of the original architectural style. Although Forgey generally praised the style, he also saw it as intimidating and compared it to a fortress. Forgey, who later became the Post's architectural critic, wrote in 1984 that Rosati's sculpture outside the building was so badly placed that it blended in with bollards and sidewalks nearby. The writer Arthur Cotton Moore wrote in 1998 that the building had "the world's worst urban plaza" but that the structure itself was nonetheless hailed for its style.

The building was reviewed more harshly by the public, often being criticized by the news media and even by HHS's own secretaries. An architectural critic for The Washington Times wrote in 2007 that the Weaver and Humphrey buildings were "two of the ugliest buildings in town" and that Breuer's designs were "stark, unfriendly buildings fronted by empty plazas". A 2014 article by BuzzFeed News ranked it as the District of Columbia's third-ugliest building. Former HHS official Andy Slavitt said of the building: "It's so ugly, it's beautiful", while another former official, Brian Harrison, similarly expressed the sentiment that the building was D.C.'s ugliest. Other HHS employees variously described the building as "functional", and "kind of sad-looking". Donald Trump, in the final days of his first presidency in 2021, signed an executive order criticizing Brutalism and specifically Breuer's Weaver and Humphrey buildings; his successor Joe Biden revoked the order.

During the 2020s, The Washington Post compared the building to "a floating monolith", and another article in the same newspaper likened the building's openings to "narrowed, conniving eyes" while praising Brutalist architecture overall. A writer for the Architectural Record said in 2024 that the negative sentiment toward the Humphrey Building was part of a trend of antipathy toward Brutalist-style U.S. federal buildings.

=== Media ===
The Humphrey Building and other Brutalist buildings in the District of Columbia were depicted in a 2023 exhibit at the Southern Utah Museum of Art, which was moved in 2025 to the National Building Museum. As part of the exhibit, the architectural firm BLDUS presented a design for a possible adaptive reuse project for the building, proposing that the building become a "Temple of Play" with slides throughout it. The Wall Street Journal wrote of BLDUS's proposal: "The architects seem to have realized that to retrofit a Brutalist stronghold is a fool's errand, and that you might as well have fun." The building was used as a filming location for the 2007 film Evan Almighty.

== See also ==
- List of Brutalist architecture in the United States
- List of Marcel Breuer works
- National Register of Historic Places listings in central Washington, D.C.
