= Robert C. Weaver Federal Building =

Office building in Washington, D.C.

- Alternative names: Department of Housing and Urban Development Headquarters

General information
- Type: Government office building
- Architectural style: Brutalist
- Location: 451 7th Street SW, Washington, D.C.
- Coordinates: 38°53′2″N 77°1′22″W
- Construction started: 1965
- Completed: September 9, 1968

Design and construction
- Architect: Marcel Breuer
- Other designers: Herbert Beckhard; firm of Nolen-Swinburne
- Main contractor: John McShain, Inc.
- U.S. Department of Housing and Urban Development
- U.S. National Register of Historic Places
- D.C. Inventory of Historic Sites
- Location within Central Washington, D.C. Location within the District of Columbia
- Area: 5.5 acres (2.2 ha)
- NRHP reference No.: 08000824

Significant dates
- Added to NRHP: August 26, 2008
- Designated DCIHS: June 26, 2008

The Robert C. Weaver Federal Building is a ten-story office building in Washington, D.C., United States. Owned by the U.S. federal government, it was built by the General Services Administration as the headquarters of the United States Department of Housing and Urban Development (HUD). Designed by Marcel Breuer in the brutalist style, it was completed in 1968. The building is one of two that Breuer designed for the U.S. federal government in the District of Columbia, along with the Hubert H. Humphrey Building, and is listed on the National Register of Historic Places.

The building was first conceived in 1962, when President John F. Kennedy established the Ad Hoc Committee on Federal Office Space. Work began after Kennedy's successor Lyndon B. Johnson signed the Housing and Urban Development Act of 1965. A cornerstone-laying ceremony took place in November 1966, and the building was formally dedicated on September 21, 1968. The plaza was redesigned in the 1990s by Martha Schwartz. The structure was renamed for Dr. Robert C. Weaver, the first Secretary of Housing and Urban Development and the first African American Cabinet member, in 2000. After HUD announced plans to move out of the building in 2025, the federal government considered demolishing it.

The Weaver Building has a curvilinear precast concrete facade, similar to Breuer's previous UNESCO Headquarters and IBM La Gaude. It is shaped like two back-to-back "Y"s, with four curving wings extending off an elongated core. Breuer designed a 6-acre (2.4 ha) plaza, which serves as the roof for an underground parking garage. The facade contains concrete panels with deeply recessed rectangular windows; the ground floor is recessed behind concrete pilotis. As built, there were two basements, a ground-level lobby and communal area, and nine office floors above. Although the building's design received architectural praise when it was built, its brutalist style and the unoriginality of its design have also received negative commentary, especially from several HUD secretaries.

== Site ==
The Robert C. Weaver Federal Building (originally the HUD Headquarters) is located at 451 7th Street SW in the Southwest Federal Center section of Southwest Washington, D.C.. The building's site spans 5.5 acres (2.2 ha). The building is surrounded by wide roads and a highway; clockwise from the north, the building occupies a city block bounded by 7th Street SW, D Street SW, 9th Street SW, and Interstate 395. On the east (7th Street) and north (D Street) sides, the Weaver Building faces other large structures, specifically the Constitution Center to the east and GSA Regional Office Building to the north. To the west, the building faces L'Enfant Plaza. An entrance to the Washington Metro's L'Enfant Plaza station is located next to the building on D Street.

During the 19th century, the surrounding area had been isolated from the rest of D.C. by the Washington City Canal and the RF&P Subdivision railroad tracks to the north. By the end of the century, the Weaver site was filled with two churches, along with low-rise rowhouses and commercial structures. The neighborhood became rundown during the mid-20th century. In 1946, the United States Congress had passed the District of Columbia Redevelopment Act, which established the District of Columbia Redevelopment Land Agency and provided for the clearance of land and redevelopment funds in the capital. After a decade of discussion, public comment, and negotiations with landowners and developers, the Southwest Urban Renewal Plan was approved in November 1956. In part, the plan cleared the way for the General Services Administration (GSA) to build new large federal office buildings between Independence Avenue SW and Southeast Freeway, along with mid-rise apartment buildings in the same area. The HUD building was constructed on the site specifically because of its proximity to both the interstate and the then-planned Washington Metro station.

== History ==
=== Development ===
The building was originally conceived for the Housing and Home Finance Agency (HHFA), created in 1947 and later superseded by the U.S. Department of Housing and Urban Development (HUD). The United States Congress passed and President Lyndon B. Johnson signed the Housing and Urban Development Act of 1965 on August 10, 1965. The legislation greatly expanded funding for existing federal housing programs, and added new programs to provide rent subsidies, grants, and urban beautification, among other things. Four weeks later, President Johnson signed legislation establishing HUD, which started operations in November 1965. The building's later namesake, HHFA Administrator Robert C. Weaver, was named the first HUD Secretary in January 1966; he was the first African American member of the cabinet of the United States. HHFA (and later HUD) occupied 20 sites in and around the District of Columbia in the mid-1960s, only a small number of which were owned by the federal government. For the other buildings, the federal government had to pay $1.4 million in annual rent.

Funding for a HHFA building had been allocated in the 1959 Public Buildings Act. In 1962, President John F. Kennedy established the Ad Hoc Committee on Federal Office Space and charged it with developing new guidelines for the design of federal office buildings. On May 23 of that year, the Ad Hoc Committee issued a one-page report, Guiding Principles for Federal Architecture, which established these new design principles. The document encouraged federal planners to consider and build structures that "reflect the dignity, enterprise, vigor and stability of the American National Government" and "embody the finest contemporary American architectural thought." At the time, few new federal buildings in Washington, D.C., were being designed in neoclassical styles, but neither were architecturally distinctive, contemporary-styled federal buildings being built. Kennedy issued a directive based on the Guiding Principles report that June.

==== Site selection and design ====
The General Services Administration, which was responsible for the development of nearly all U.S. federal buildings, oversaw the building's construction. In January 1963, the District Redevelopment Land Agency proposed constructing a building for HHFA within the Southwest Urban Renewal area, at the corner of 7th and D streets SW. This was to be the sixth federal building in the redevelopment area. A site had not been selected by that April, when the United States House Committee on Appropriations approved $3 million in funding for site selection and further planning activities. The GSA acquired a 4-acre (1.6 ha) site from the District Redevelopment Land Agency that June.

In August 1963, the GSA awarded the design contract to Marcel Breuer & Associates of New York City and Nolan-Swinburne & Associates of Philadelphia. The building, to be located on D Street SW between 7th and 9th streets SW, was to house several federal urban-renewal and development agencies across about 1,350,000 square feet (125,000 m^{2}). (Note: These agencies included the housing offices of the United States Department of Transportation, Federal National Mortgage Association, Public Housing Administration, and Urban Renewal Administration.) At the time, the engineering work was supposed to be completed in February 1965 so construction could begin the next year. One unidentified federal official said of Breuer's involvement that "a sense of victory attends [his] selection", expressing optimism that the building's design would conform to contemporary "cultural values". Karel Yasko, the GSA's assistant commissioner for design and construction, oversaw the design process in accordance with the Ad Hoc Committee's guidelines. Yasko said of the plans, "We're proving that it costs no more to hire a good architect than a poor one."

The HUD building was intended to showcase the Ad Hoc Committee's design guidelines, while also conforming to the site's limited area and local height restrictions. Additionally, it was supposed to include space for up to 6,000 employees. When the plans were presented to the United States Commission of Fine Arts in June 1964, commission members raised concerns about minor parts of the design (such as windowsill height), although they viewed the plans favorably. The National Capital Planning Commission (NCPC) delayed its own approval of the plans while NCPC members and Weaver debated how many parking spaces the new building should have. The NCPC approved the plans in July 1964 after acceding to Weaver's proposal that the building include one parking space per 11 employees, although those extra spaces were never built. The next month, the United States Congress allocated $26 million for the project.

By late 1964, Breuer and Nolen-Swinburne had drawn up plans for a ten-story building, costing $26 million, to be made largely of concrete. The material was used because it symbolized "enterprise and vigor", two of Kennedy's Guiding Principles. Breuer gave the final drawings to the GSA in April 1965, and the GSA detailed plans for the building at the White House Conference on Natural Beauty the next month.

==== Construction ====
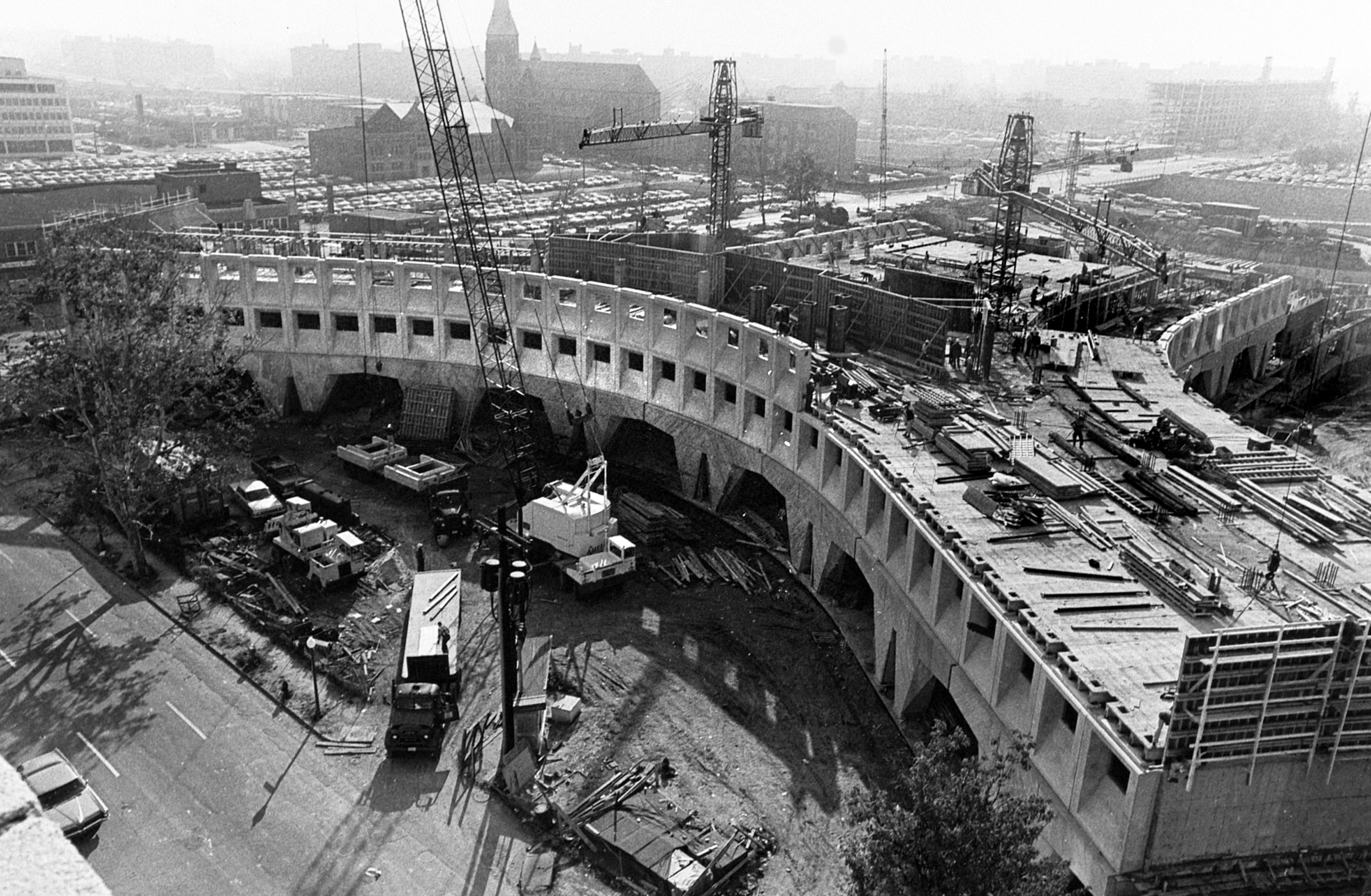
The building under construction

Congress's total appropriation came to $29 million (about $199 million in 2024 dollars). John McShain, Inc., a major federal building contractor in the Washington, D.C., area, was named the general contractor, receiving a $22.3 million construction contract in June 1965. Work began on July 20 of that year, and site preparation began in November 1965. When work began, the project was variously expected to cost $22 million (about $162 million in 2024 dollars) or $32 million (about $236 million in 2024 dollars).

The project was originally planned to be finished in late 1967, but a May 1966 strike by the United Brotherhood of Carpenters and Joiners of America temporarily delayed construction. The building's cornerstone was laid during a ceremony on November 10, 1966, attended by Vice President Hubert H. Humphrey. The facade contractor had had no previous experience producing architectural concrete, but instead had supplied precast forms for bridges and parking garages. The facade panels also had to be installed in an extremely precise manner because of the facade's curvature.

During the HUD building's construction, the 3-foot (0.91 m)-thick footings for the western portion of the building, extending 23 feet (7.0 m) underground, were accidentally built 1.5 to 3.5 feet (0.46 to 1.07 m) over the property line. When L'Enfant Properties, leaseholder of the property abutting the HUD site, began construction of L'Enfant Plaza Hotel in 1971, the company sued John McShain, Inc. and the Redevelopment Land Agency for removal of the footings, stabilization of the HUD structure, and associated costs. The action spawned several lengthy court battles, which lasted through the 1970s. Also during construction, the top floor and roof of the building were severely damaged by a fire in November 1967. The building's final finishes were in the process of installation by 1968.

=== 20th-century use ===
==== Opening and early years ====
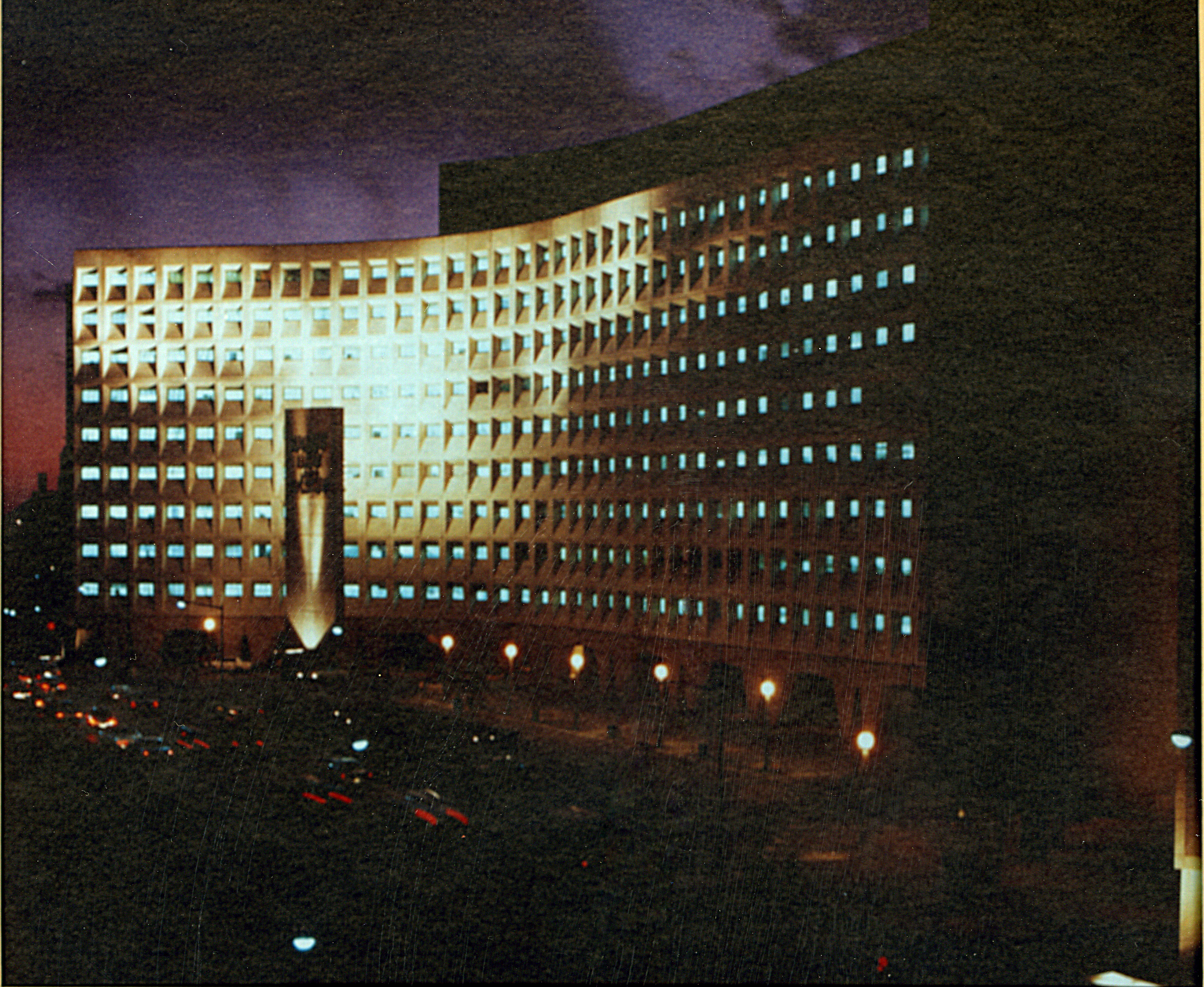
The building as seen at night

HUD moved its headquarters to the new Southwest D.C. building starting in May 1968. The Federal National Mortgage Association moved its headquarters to the building the next month. HUD's relocation took place over 15 weekends to minimize work disruptions, but even so, HUD employees complained that the relocation had been disorganized. That August, Johnson hosted a press conference outside the building, signing the Housing and Urban Development Act of 1968 there. The HUD headquarters building was formally dedicated on September 8, 1968; Johnson and Weaver attended the opening ceremony.

The final cost was less than anticipated, at $26 million (about $178 million in 2024 dollars), amounting to about $17 per square foot ($180/m^{2}) of gross floor area. (Note: According to the National Park Service, the office area is 700,000 square feet (65,000 m^{2}) and the gross floor area is 1.325 million square feet (123,100 m^{2}). The building cost $26 million; thus, the cost per square foot of gross area is $19.62 per square foot ($211.2/m^{2}). If only office area is included, then the cost per square foot of office area is $37.14 per square foot ($399.8/m^{2}).) The office space took up only about half of the gross floor area, giving the building a cost of $38 per square foot ($410/m^{2}) of office space. The office costs elicited criticism from U.S. Senator Jennings Randolph, who claimed that a private office building across the street could be built for about 60% that amount. Nonetheless, Breuer was reportedly pleased at the cost savings compared with other federal government structures.

At the time of its opening, the building had 4,300 employees. George W. Romney, who had succeeded Weaver as HUD Secretary, said the building enabled HUD to have all its activities in a single facility. The structure was equipped with a computing center, which consolidated various computer systems that HUD had used previously. Originally, HUD installed furniture from its previous buildings within the offices, but the carpets and desks were brand-new. The interior was subdivided into cubicles with undistinguished furniture designs similar to those in other office buildings. The entrance lobbies were open only to HUD employees and were heavily guarded. The outdoor plaza was originally supposed to contain a flagstone pavement with lights, benches, and bollards, along with a tall sculpture at the primary vehicular entrance. These features were not included in the original construction, and the entrance court was thus described as having a bleak ambiance.

==== 1970s and 1980s ====
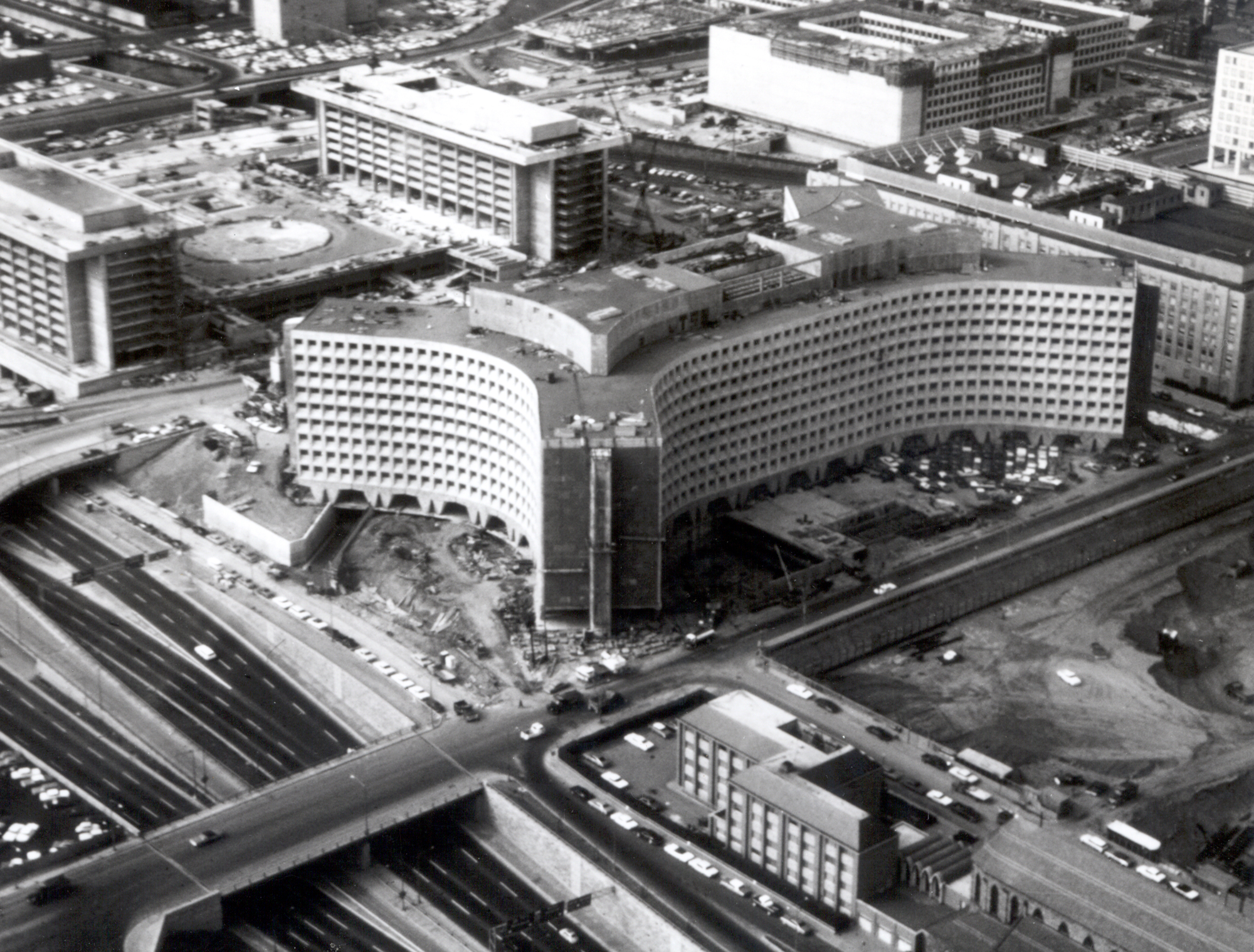
Aerial view from the southeast

As L'Enfant Plaza became more popular in the 1970s, congestion began to increase at the northern entrance lobby, even though the southern lobby was the main entrance. Additionally, the interiors were initially sparsely decorated, although colorful tapestries were installed in the cafeteria to provide color. At HUD officials' request, after a taller flagpole was installed at another nearby federal building in the early 1970s, the original flagpole outside the headquarters was replaced with two 80-foot-tall (24 m) flagpoles. Automatic doors were also added to improve accessibility, and HUD outsourced janitorial duties to a private contractor to reduce the cost of having to hire federal employees.

The HUD building employed about 4,000 people by 1980, when a years-long hiring freeze was implemented; the building's staffing numbers decreased by one-third in the eight years that followed. The GSA was considering "cooperative uses" for the HUD building by 1983, seeking a private partner to potentially adapt some of the space for other purposes, including commercial or cultural use. With the continued attrition of HUD's staff in the building, workers from eight other buildings were relocated into the vacant offices. To save money, HUD also replaced the building's janitorial contractor in 1986. Then-Representative Chuck Schumer proposed converting three stories of the HUD building to a homeless shelter in 1988, a plan that HUD rejected.

==== 1990s modifications ====
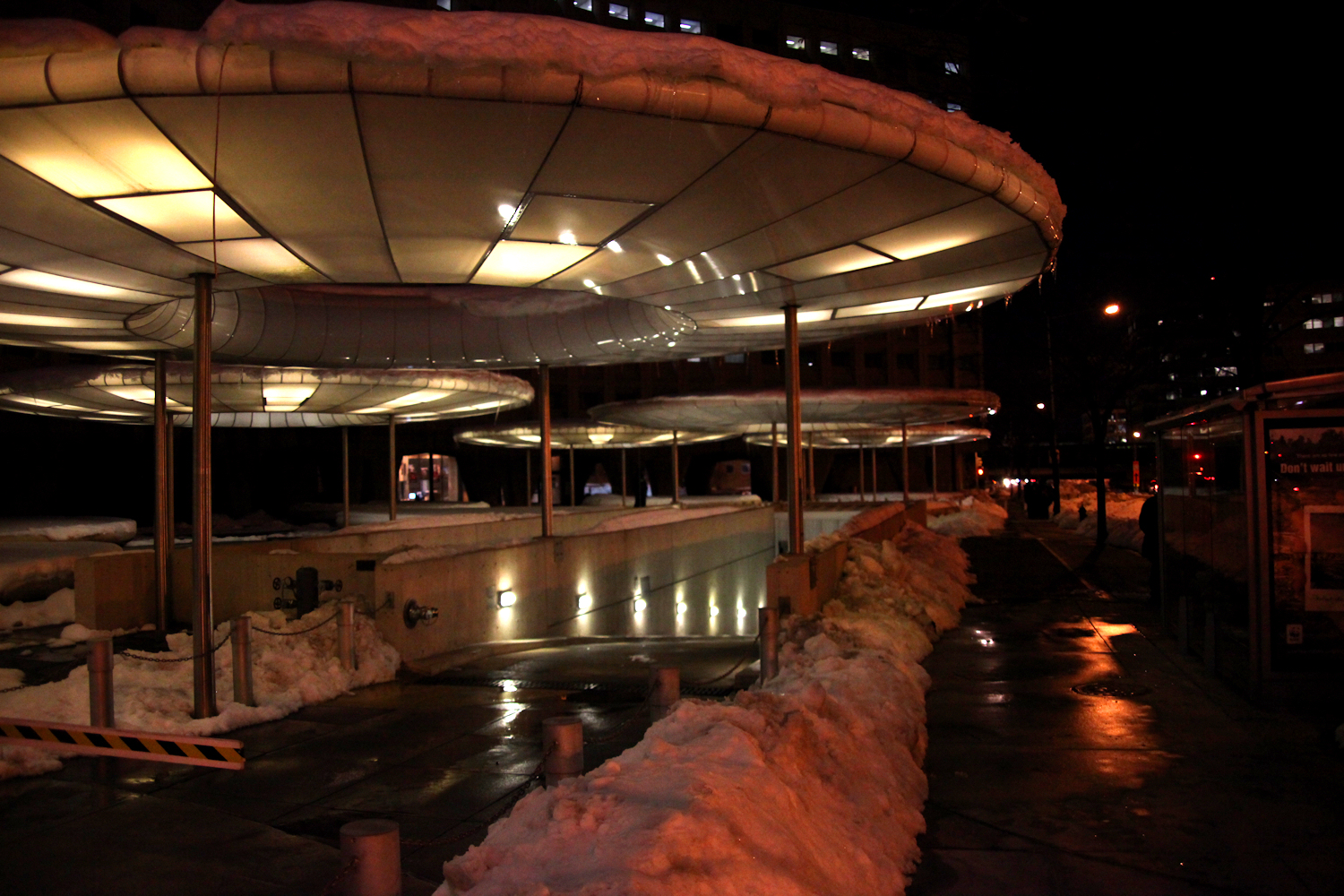
The donut-shaped, white canopies on the Weaver Building's main plaza at night. The exit from the parking garage can be seen under the canopies, and the lighted entrance to the south lobby in the middle-left distance.

The plaza began leaking water into the building's underground parking garage in the late 1980s. Rather than merely fix the leak, HUD Secretary Henry Cisneros encouraged GSA to renovate or reconstruct the plaza to make it more worker- and pedestrian-friendly. A new roof was installed atop the building during the early 1990s. After a homeless woman died outside the headquarters in 1993, HUD Assistant Secretary Andrew Cuomo announced that the building would be used as a backup homeless shelter on days with below-freezing weather. In addition, Cisneros installed a portrait gallery in the northern ground-level lobby in 1995 to celebrate HUD's 30th anniversary.

In 1994, Martha Schwartz, a landscape architect known for unconventional and colorful designs, was commissioned to redesign the plaza. After receiving public feedback during a workshop sponsored by the National Endowment for the Arts, Schwartz announced an initial design. The early plans called for grass-filled concrete planters that doubled as seating, to be topped by multicolored round, backlit canopies supported by steel posts; she described the scheme as a "floating garden". Schwartz's original plan entailed clearing part of the ground level to connect the different outdoor spaces abutting each of the building's elevations. Although the design passed through the GSA's rigorous planning and design process and had the support of J. Carter Brown (then-chairman of the United States Commission of Fine Arts) and HUD Secretary Cisneros (a trained urban planner), GSA Commissioner Robert A. Peck strongly disliked it.

By the time Schwartz's design was ready for installation, Cisneros had left HUD; Cuomo, his successor, reportedly disliked the canopies and feared that the brightly colored plastic would draw public ridicule. Cuomo advocated for alterations, even though the original plans cost $1.3 million. In a compromise, the canopies were retained but were colored a neutral white. For the wall under the loggia, Schwartz also designed a backlit mural depicting HUD-financed building projects, but this was canceled over cost concerns. The redesigned plaza was completed in 1998. During the late 1990s, Cuomo also announced plans to relocate several HUD offices away from the headquarters, and a neighborhood office for D.C. residents was relocated to a nearby storefront.

=== 21st-century use ===
The building as seen from the northeast

After Weaver died in 1997, his widow Mary Burke Washington contacted HUD Secretary Cuomo about the possibility of renaming the HUD headquarters building. Representative Charles Rangel and Senator Daniel Patrick Moynihan, both representing New York, sponsored legislation to rename the HUD headquarters. In July 2000, the HUD building was officially renamed the Robert C. Weaver Federal Building in honor of Weaver. Four of the office stories were repaired after a fire in 2005. As part of a $7 million project in the mid-2000s, under the tenure of HUD Secretary Alphonso Jackson, the Weaver Building's dining room was upgraded and an auditorium was added. Although the renovation was criticized as a suboptimal use of resources in the years before the 2008 financial crisis, acting HUD Secretary Roy Bernardi said the project "was necessary for us to conduct our work, which includes a necessary place for public gatherings."

The Weaver Building was added to the National Register of Historic Places on August 26, 2008. The same year, the Weaver Building was added to the District of Columbia Inventory of Historic Sites. HUD executives were temporarily relocated from the top floor in 2010 because of concerns that weakened structural supports had left the roof in danger of collapse. Meanwhile, the number of HUD staffers in the Weaver Building had continued to decline since the 1980s, and the entire ground floor was vacant by 2017. The building remained relatively unchanged through the 2020s; the cafeteria was shuttered during the COVID-19 pandemic and remained closed for years. In 2024, the GSA requested congressional approval for $21.7 million to pay for structural, mechanical, and architectural repairs.

==== HUD relocation and proposed demolition ====
HUD laid off many of the building's staff when the second presidency of Donald Trump began in 2025. The agency announced in April that it would try to sell the Weaver Building, citing deferred maintenance costs and a desire to relocate to a smaller space. At the time, employees complained of maintenance issues such as broken toilets and mold infestations, and HUD officials alleged that the building needed $500 million to remedy deferred maintenance. The officials claimed that relocating the headquarters would save the agency $56 million annually. In conjunction with HUD's move, the GSA placed the Weaver Building on its list of buildings targeted for "accelerated disposition". HUD announced in June that it would move to Alexandria, Virginia. That month, U.S. Senator Joni Ernst introduced the FOR SALE Act, proposing that the Weaver Building and five other federal structures be sold off. Nina Albert, one of D.C.'s deputy mayors, expressed concerns that HUD's relocation would cause the neighborhood around the Weaver Building to become blighted.

In December 2025, in an unrelated lawsuit involving the Eisenhower Executive Office Building, a former GSA official testified the Trump administration was considering demolishing the Weaver Building without receiving requisite approval from the GSA, though Trump administration officials denied the allegations. Preservationists expressed concerns at the allegations, as Trump had previously expressed disdain for brutalist structures and had recently demolished the White House's East Wing without much public consultation. At that time, some HUD staff still worked in the Weaver Building. HUD began relocating workers to the new Alexandria headquarters in early 2026, though the moves had little congressional oversight. The legality and cost of the relocation had been disputed by Democratic U.S. senators, and HUD had refused to divulge the cost of the move, threatening to fire an employee who had expressed concerns over the cost. In June 2026, local developer Rooted Communities proposed converting the building into supportive housing, but District of Columbia mayor Muriel Bowser objected to the plan. Small business sued that July to stop HUD from leaving the Weaver Building, and HUD ended its efforts to sell the building the same month.

== Architecture ==
The Robert C. Weaver Federal Building was primarily designed by Marcel Breuer. The Weaver Building is the first of two buildings in Washington, D.C., designed by Breuer; the other is the Hubert H. Humphrey Building, for which Breuer received the commission after positive reception to the HUD design. Breuer and Herbert Beckhard, one of his frequent collaborators, collaborated on the initial drawings. Nolen-Swinburne & Associates oversaw the final drawings; the Architectural Record specifically credited Nolen-Swinburne employee Chard F. Webb. Paul Weidlinger was the structural engineer, and Loring & Associates was the mechanical engineering firm.

The Weaver Building was the first precast concrete building to be built for the federal government of the United States in the District of Columbia, the first federal office building with a modular design, and among the first precast-concrete U.S. federal buildings overall. It was one of nine brutalist federal government buildings constructed in Southwest Washington, D.C., in the third quarter of the 20th century. In addition, the building may have been D.C.'s first project to adhere to Kennedy's Guiding Principles for Federal Architecture, though the extent to which the building's design or the architects' selection was influenced by the Guiding Principles is disputed. The curved design contrasted with the rectangular federal buildings that preceded it; at the time, architecturally-distinctive U.S. government buildings tended to be chanceries in other countries. The Weaver Building's use of load-bearing concrete facade panels and pilotis (or vertical piers) was an adaptation of a similar feature that Breuer had used in IBM La Gaude, his first building to incorporate these features. Though the design was derided in later years, The Washington Post wrote in 2008 that the building fit in with the architecture of its time.

=== Form ===
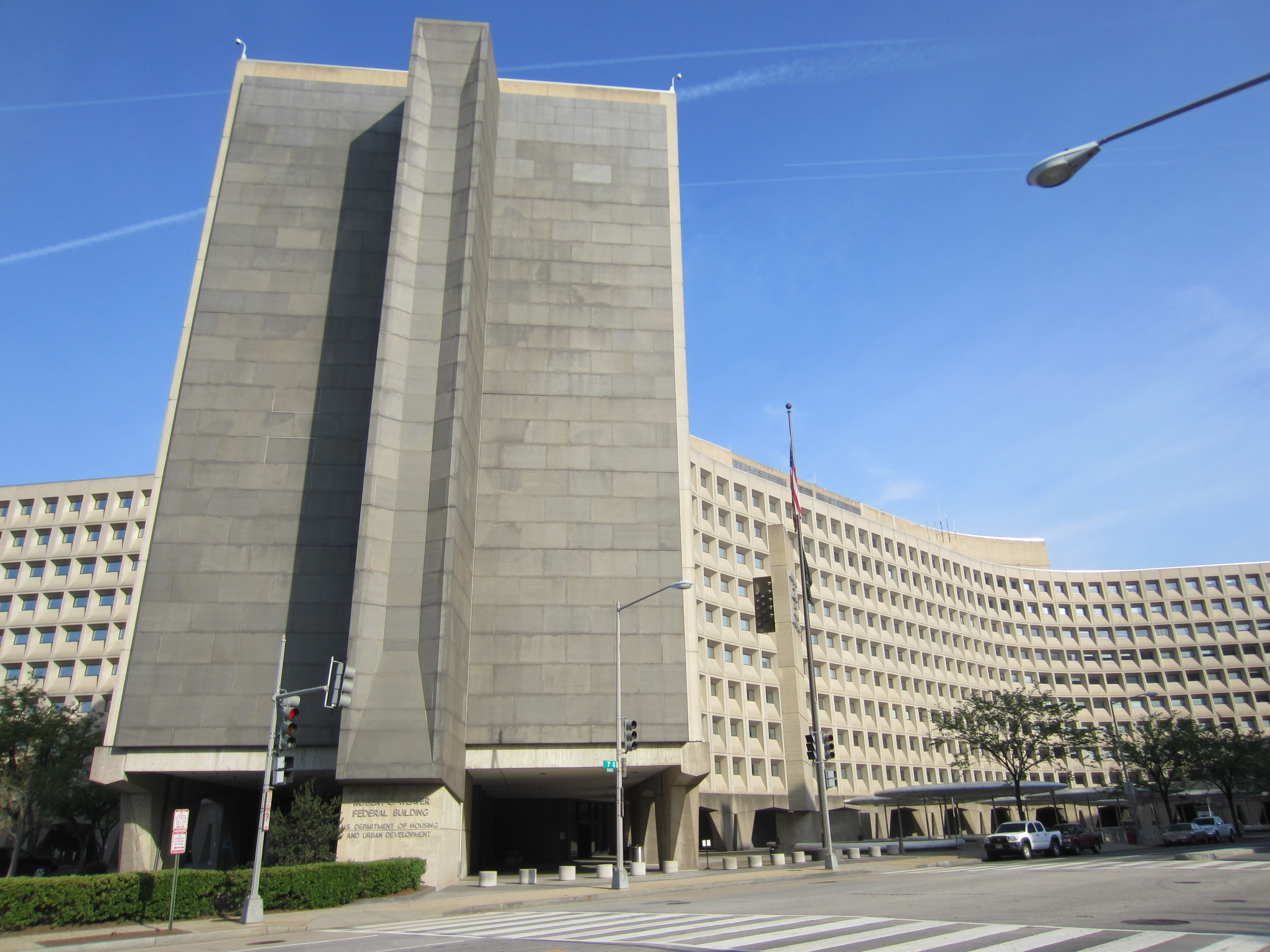
The end wall of the southeast wing

The building measures ten stories high, with another two floors beneath. The design resembles that of a doubled capital letter "Y" (sometimes described as an elongated "X"), with an elongated spine and four symmetrical, curving wings. This design creates two long, concave elevations to the west and east, and two shorter ones at the north and south ends. Because of this site arrangement, the building abuts the lot line only at the corners of the city block, where the ends of the wings are situated. The curved massing resembled two of Breuer's previous designs in France: the UNESCO Headquarters in Paris and the IBM Research Center in La Gaude. These buildings, along with IBM Boca Raton, were among several Y-shaped designs Breuer created during his lifetime; the general shape was based on a 1936 "Civic Center of the Future" design that Breuer and F. R. S. Yorke had created for the British Cement and Concrete Association. When the HUD building opened, The Washington Daily News described it as "wing-shaped".

At its extremities, the building measures 588 1/24 feet (179 m) along its longer north–south axis and about 368 15/24 feet (112 m) along its shorter east–west axis. (Note: Another source gives a figure of 588 by 372 feet (179 by 113 m).) The wings are each 75–76 feet (23–23 m) wide, while the central spine between the north and south pairs of wings is 146–150 feet (45–46 m) wide. The curvilinear shape allowed the maximum amount of natural light to reach the maximum number of offices, while increasing the amount of office space that could be built within the constraints of the site. Breuer likened the outstretched wings to the arms of a Renaissance-styled palazzo. This design emulated much of the architectural style adopted during the early 1960s in Washington, D.C., such as at the Watergate complex.

The flat roof is 129 3/4 feet (39.5 m) high, with a double-height mechanical penthouse that rises another 28 1/2 feet (8.7 m). The penthouse has a concrete facade, which encloses ducts and an elevator room inside. An observation deck with benches, tables, and a pavement is located south of the penthouse. When the building was constructed, there was a rooftop lunch area, but HUD dissuaded staff from using it because the lunch area had backless benches and lacked wind-resisting barriers.

There is parking both at and below ground level, as GSA's design specifications required that extensive underground parking be incorporated into the building. The parking garage is cited as having 345 spaces across three subterranean levels. Though the parking garage is sometimes cited as containing 550 spaces, this includes the above-ground parking areas. Due to the parking garage's site constraints, it includes many sharp turns.

==== Outdoor spaces and plaza ====
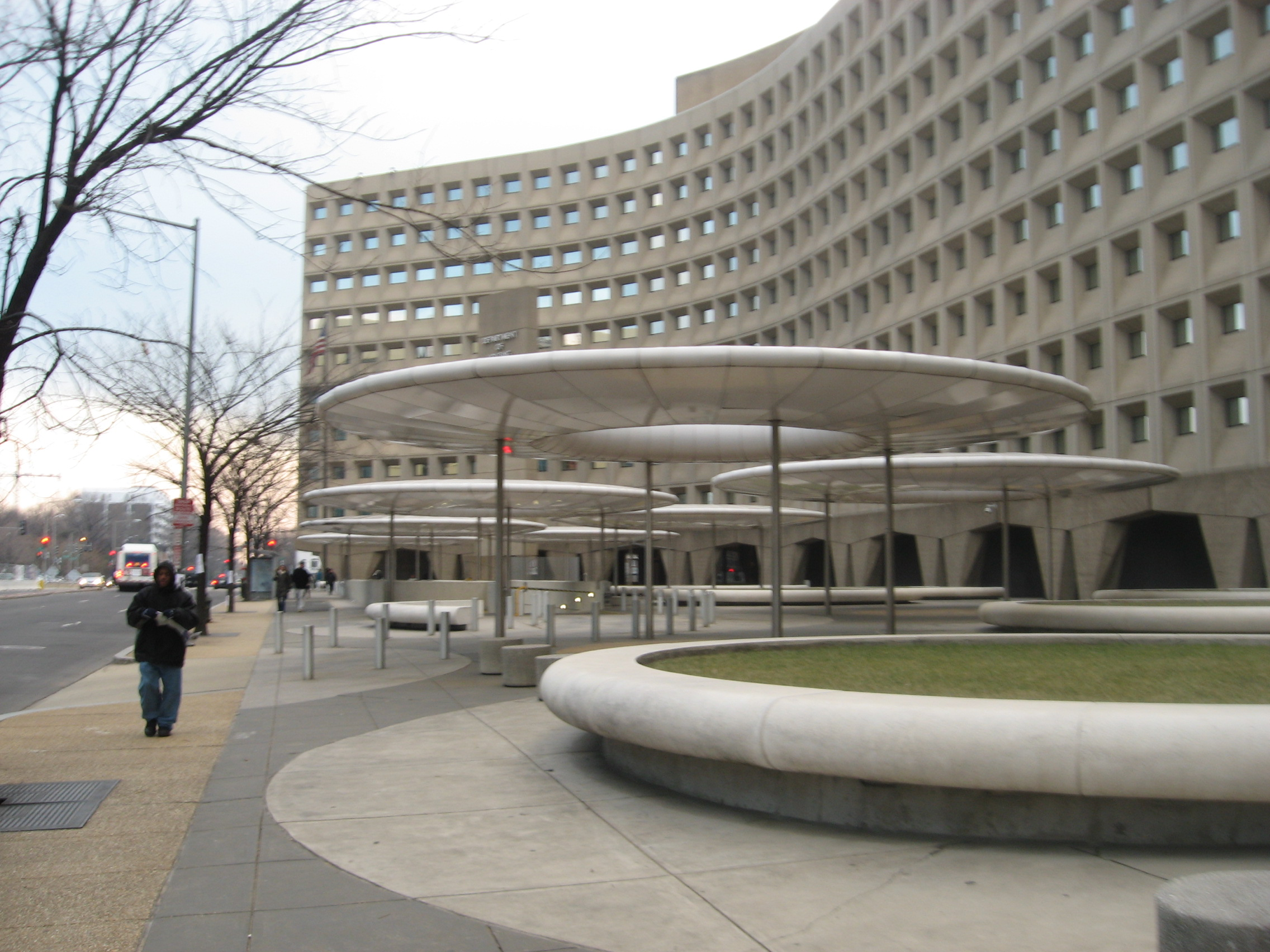
View of the eastern plaza during the daytime

Each elevation abuts an outdoor space or courtyard; due to the building's design, these were originally isolated from the other outdoor spaces. The courtyards were intended to contain plantings such as Japanese pagoda, willow oak, and English ivy, which were not present at the building's completion. The northern courtyard has a playground, a private parking area, and a staircase to L'Enfant Plaza; the private parking area extends partially under the upper stories and is delineated by pyramidal concrete bollards. In the southern courtyard are a lawn and more parking, also delineated by pyramidal concrete bollards. Both the northern and southern parking areas have wood-and-stucco booths for attendants, designed by Breuer. The western courtyard is divided into two sections and contains benches, bluestone paving, a loading dock, and HVAC grilles. The western courtyard also has plantings and a walkway dating from the mid-1970s.

For the eastern space, Breuer designed a lightweight, 6-acre (2.4 ha) plaza above the underground parking garage. Because the plaza had to be lightweight, it was planned without plantings, but its shape and vast expanse were nonetheless intended to relate aesthetically to the nearby National Mall. The plaza originally had a bluestone pavement, the use of which was an important detail to Breuer, who wanted to contrast the plaza's material with the concrete facade. Bluestone was also used in the recessed ground-level arcade surrounding the building. A curving driveway, delineated by concrete bollards, leads vehicular traffic into the garage entrance and exit at the center of the plaza. A branch of the driveway travels to the front doors, allowing high-ranking visitors' vehicles to drop passengers off directly. The bluestone pavement was replaced in the 1990s with concrete.

There were originally concrete lampposts with spherical light fixtures, which are no longer extant. In addition, there is a 76-foot-tall (23 m) concrete sign in the plaza, which originally spelled out HUD's name on its northeast-facing side and had spotlights on its southwest-facing side. There are two 80-foot-tall (24 m) flagpoles in the plaza, which replaced a shorter flagpole to the south. Martha Schwartz's 1990s redesign for the plaza includes white canopies. There are seven canopies in total, which are circular and made of vinyl. The canopies are supported by metal pylons measuring 14 ft (4.3 m) high and are illuminated at night. The plaza also has six circular seating planters made of concrete and there are flowerpots and trees on the street. Each planter contains grass and measures 30 feet (9.1 m) wide. There are colorful pavers on the ground surrounding the planters.

=== Facade ===
==== Lower stories ====
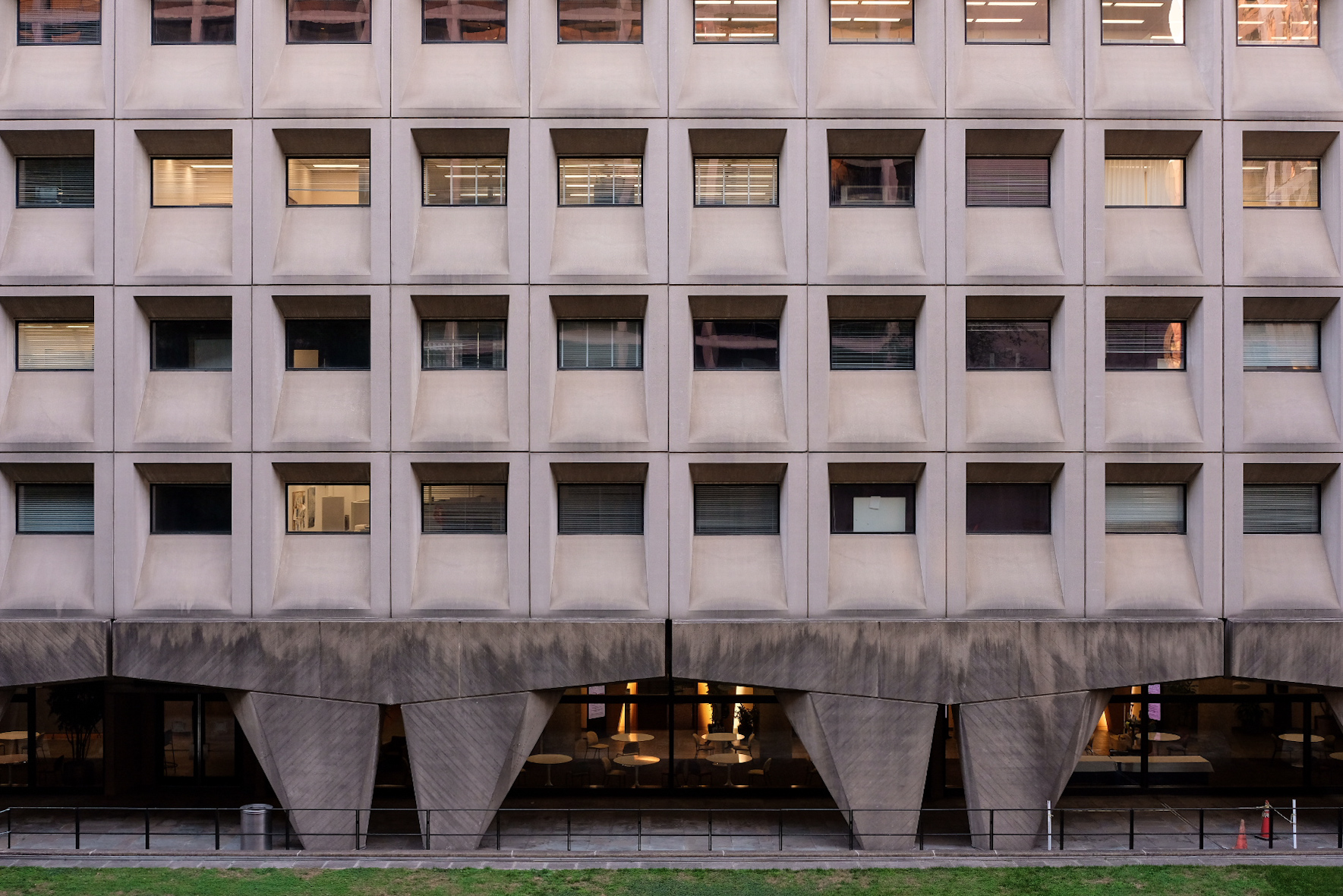
West-facing facade of the Weaver Building with load-bearing concrete pilotis on the first floor

The base of the building was designed to look much different from the upper nine floors, with angled pilotis contrasting with the upper stories' curving facade. The perimeter rests on 44 load-bearing pilotis made of reinforced concrete, which are each spaced 40 feet (12 m) apart. The pilotis measure 4 feet (1.2 m) thick, with a maximum cross-section of 17 by 40 feet (5.2 by 12.2 m), and have chamfers between each of their faces. The pilotis consist of a pair of V-shaped columns that taper toward a narrow base. (Note: According to the Architectural Record, each pilotis' pair of columns actually functions as a single element with its central section removed. For clarity, this article describes each pilotis as having two columns.) The width of each column tapers downward from 12 to 2 3/4 feet (3.66 to 0.84 m). Above are concrete girders that measure 5 feet (1.5 m) thick, spanning the distance between each pilotis. The girders and pilotis were both created using wooden formwork, and, as such, the wood-grain markings are still visible on these decorative elements.

The first floor is recessed behind the pilotis, creating an arcade measuring about 15 feet (4.6 m) wide. The walls on the first floor's periphery are made of cast-in-place concrete, which in turn is sheathed in granite. No abrasive blasting or acid etching of the visible exterior concrete was used to smooth the appearance of the structure, as Breuer and Beckhard believed that concrete casting techniques had advanced sufficiently to no longer require it. The building also has plate-glass walls, which are surrounded by aluminum frames. The soffit above the arcade is made of plaster. There is a cornerstone on the eastern elevation, facing 7th Street SW.

The building is primarily accessed from entrances on either end of the west and east elevations, but there are smaller entrances in the centers of these elevations and at the end of each wing. The main entrance faces southeast, and there is another entrance to the southwest that retains its original design. The northwest entrance from L'Enfant Plaza, an employee-only entrance, has a steel entrance vestibule. There are also glass-and-steel entrances on the eastern and western elevations; the eastern entrances also have glass vestibules recessed inside the facade.

==== Upper stories ====
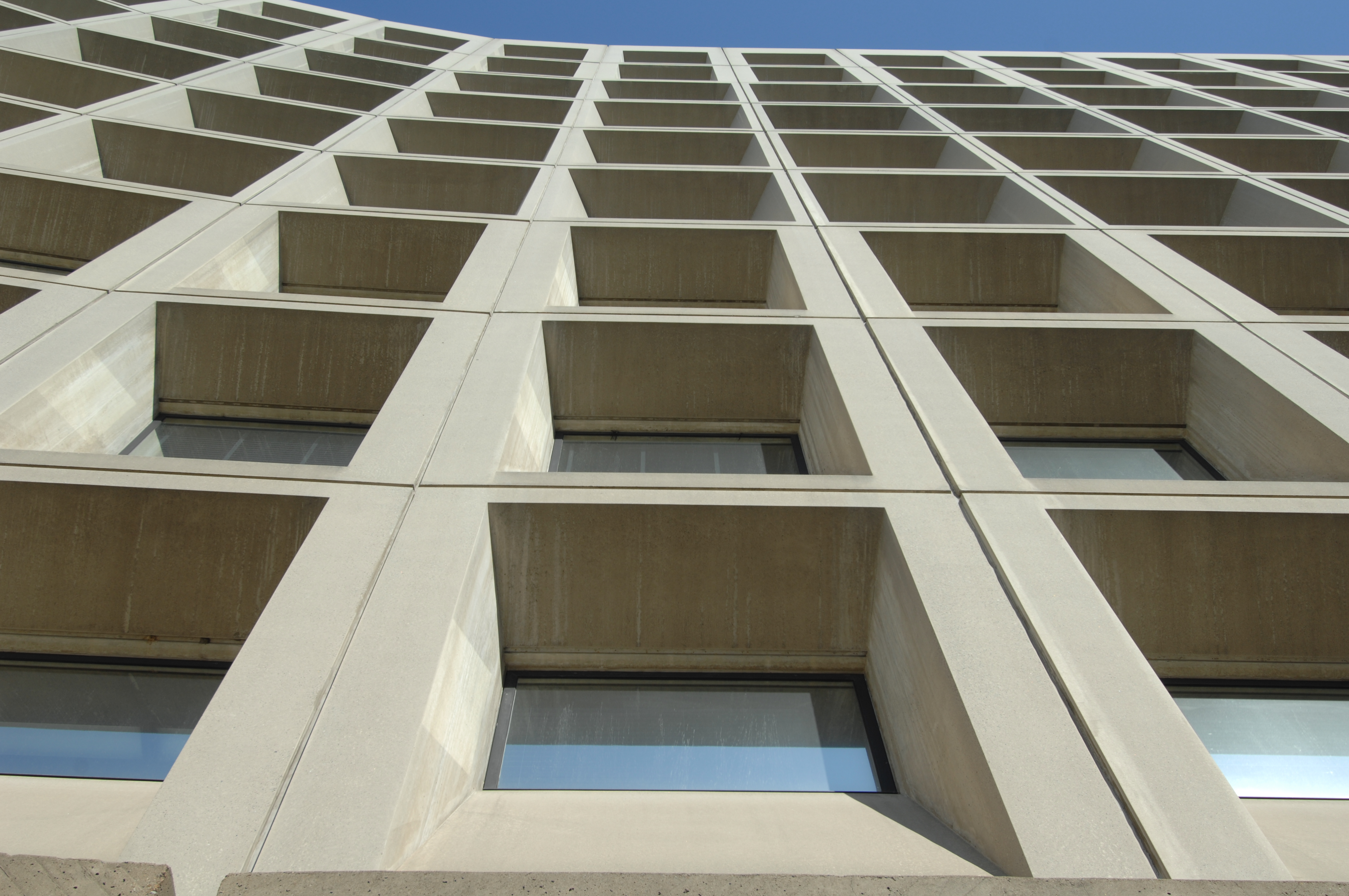
Close-up of windows in concrete panels

The upper stories are clad with 1,584 precast concrete panels. The building was the first Breuer-designed structure in the United States to use a precast concrete facade, and this was the first federal building to be built of precast concrete. The facade panels are of different heights. (Note: The panels were manufactured to the following heights: Second to fourth, ninth floors: 10 7/8 feet (3.3 m); Fifth to eighth floors: 12 feet (3.7 m); Tenth floor: 17 feet (5.2 m)) Each concrete unit is 3 feet (0.91 m) thick and weighs up to 13 tons (11.8 metric tonnes). (Note: Some sources cited the panels as weighing 12 short tons (11 long tons; 11 t).) The panels have a uniform width of 10 feet (3.0 m), corresponding to the widths of the building's interior floor modules. The panels were originally supposed to be 6 feet (1.8 m) wide to align with the width of the floors inside, but during the building's construction, Breuer convinced the U.S. federal government to use a wider floor plan so he could use a more squarish shape for the facade panels. The panels are arranged vertically into 56 bays on the west and east elevations, and 32 bays on the north and south elevations.

Thicker panels are used on the bottom and top floors than on the intermediate floors. The second- to fourth-story panels are load-bearing, so they are both thick and solid. The panels on the fifth through seventh floors required the least amount of fabrication, as they did not need to bear load nor contain piping. The panels on the eighth to tenth floors are thick but hollow, since they contain HVAC piping, which is supplied by equipment on the roof. The mullions between different panels vary in width on each story. Pipes also run up through the building's walls and vent at the corners of the window frames, dispersing exhaust fumes at the roof.

Deep-set windows in rectilinear shapes, a Breuer trademark, are used on the facade, surrounded by the precast-concrete panels on all sides. The panels are beveled inward toward the window openings on all sides; the bevels are wider than those used on the UNESCO or IBM buildings. Each window measures 6 1/3 by 3 3/4 feet (1.9 by 1.1 m) across, being substantially smaller than the surrounding facade panels. The windows themselves were built with aluminum frames and could swing vertically. The walls at the ends of each wing lack windows and are clad in granite, with a stair tower protruding from each wing. The cladding covers a steel superstructure with cast-in-place concrete slabs attached to it.

=== Structural and mechanical features ===
To distribute the building's weight across the sandy, silty ground underneath, the building's foundation consists of a concrete mat measuring 4.5 to 6.5 feet (1.4 to 2.0 m) thick. The structure's interior floor slabs are made of precast concrete, arranged into 3,168 T-shaped panels. Late in the design process, the GSA had wanted to use another material for the floor slabs, as accountants had estimated that the cost of precast concrete floors would be exceptionally high; the agency eventually used Breuer's original design, and the floors were fabricated for significantly less than estimated. At ground level, concrete beams extend 30 feet (9.1 m) inward from the pilotis, and there are rectangular columns made of reinforced concrete. These columns measure 16 to 30 inches (410 to 760 mm) wide on each side. An array of columns is set back 30 feet (9.1 m) from each elevation, and the central spine has three more arrays of interior columns. The interior columns and exterior panels support the building's upper stories. The concrete superstructure transfers structural forces to the pilotis at the perimeter.

The north and south end of the building's central spine each have a service core with elevators, stairs, and other mechanical spaces. The cores provide further structural reinforcement, and each core is accessed by a different ground-level elevator lobby. There are eight passenger elevators in each lobby, alongside separate banks of freight elevators in either core. Initially, the HUD secretary could use a key to summon one of the passenger elevators to travel directly to the secretary's office. The stair tower at the end of each wing contains a stairwell and helps further stiffen the end of each wing. The stairs themselves have concrete steps, concrete walls, and either steel or oak railings.

Offices on the building's perimeter have fan coil units, while offices further inside are served by more traditional HVAC ducts. A conveyor belt, extending 143 1/4 feet (43.7 m) long, serves 11 floors—the two basements and all above-ground stories except the first.

=== Interior ===
As built, the structure contained 700,000 square feet (65,000 m^{2}) of usable office space, out of a gross floor area of 1.325 million square feet (123,100 m^{2}). There is approximately 70,000 square feet (6,500 m^{2}) of usable space per floor. (Note: The Washington Daily News gives a figure of 71,000 square feet (6,600 m^{2}).) From the outset, the HUD building was designed with amenities such as a library, clinic, and cafeteria, along with provisions for a direct Washington Metro connection. The exposed concrete inside is bush-hammered, contrasting with the plaster finishes inside. Breuer advocated for the use of other contrasting decorations, such as wood paneling, chrome rails, and a granite front desk.

==== Basements ====
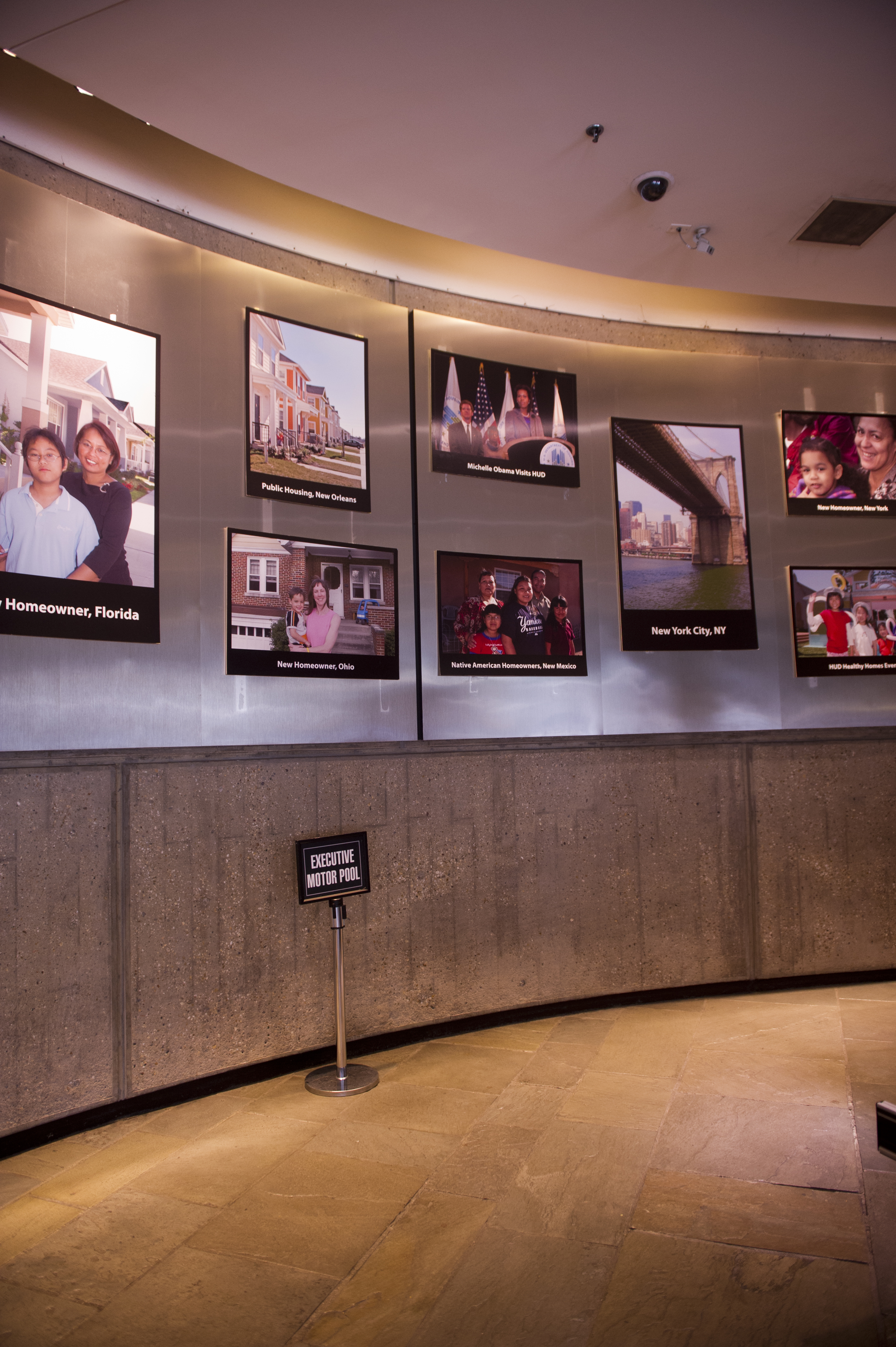
A photo display in the lobby

In the second basement, which includes document-distribution and storage areas, the walls and floors are made of concrete poured into wood forms. Ten stairways—eight within the building itself and two within the underground parking garage to the east—ascend from the second basement to various parts of the building.

The first basement includes a mailroom, printing plant, document-management department, media space, and fitness center, and a loading dock facing southwest. The ceilings and floor surfaces are made of tiles, while the walls are made of concrete within the elevator lobbies and plaster within the hallways. The first basement was originally planned with an auditorium, which was never constructed.

==== Ground level ====
The ground-floor interiors are designed in a similar manner to the exterior and have communal spaces, including a dining room, a kitchen, and service areas. Entrance lobbies connect with the elevator lobbies to the south and north. The lobbies have bluestone floors and exposed concrete walls, and they originally had plaster ceilings. The use of exposed concrete in the lobbies was intended to continue the rough textures of the exterior. The lobbies adjoining the northeast and southeast entrances have lounges with curved walls. These lobbies, along with the northeast entrance lobby, have security screening areas. There is also a security guard booth within the southeast entrance lobby. Many of the finishes have been replaced; for example, the original plaster ceilings were replaced with gypsum board ceilings when sprinklers were added.

The dining room, measuring 55 by 200 feet (17 by 61 m) across, is on the west side of the first story. Breuer originally planned to put the dining room on the second story, but he ultimately put it on the first story facing a garden, saying it demonstrated what he called a "human side of architecture". The dining room is accessed from three exterior doors facing L'Enfant Plaza, along with additional interior doors facing north and south. It has a plate-glass wall on the west and plaster walls on its other sides. The room contains large cast-in-place concrete columns, which are painted white and flank a central corridor with vinyl-tile floors. The seating areas west and east of the central corridor are in an open plan arrangement, and the ceilings are made of dropped acoustic tile. Two west–east partitions, wainscoted in ceramic tiles, originally divided the dining room into three sections from south to north. The south end of the eastern seating area has an auditorium with movable partitions and seats.

The east side of the first story has a service area and kitchen, although the service area has been subdivided. The service area has vinyl-tiled floors, while the kitchen has ceramic-tile floors; both spaces have columns clad in ceramic tiles. The passenger elevator lobbies have bluestone floors, bush-hammered concrete walls, plaster ceilings, alcoves, and signage. Telephone alcoves and bathrooms adjoin both lobbies, and exits lead outside to the western courtyard. Oscar Stonorov's bust of the public-housing advocate Catherine Bauer Wurster, which adorns the building's south elevator lobby, was the only artwork in the building upon its completion. There is also a freight elevator lobby in the south core.

==== Office stories ====
On the second to tenth floors, the elevator lobbies lead to corridors, which provide access to conference areas, offices, and other spaces. The elevator lobbies on the upper floors have vinyl-tiled floors and gypsum-board ceilings. The elevator lobbies have murals (added in 1972) and telephone alcoves. Bathrooms, mechanical rooms, and freight elevator lobbies are placed within the cores, adjoining the passenger elevators. Two corridors, one each on the east and west side, form an unbroken passageway measuring approximately 600 feet (180 m) long, serving the wings. The corridors have acoustic-tiled ceilings and plaster walls, which curve to parallel the exterior. The corridors are flanked by offices, which are accessed by steel doors within the corridor wall. As part of a color-coding system for each wing, the walls around each door are painted in either red, yellow, black, or blue. (Note: The color-coding is as follows: Northwest wing: Red; Northeast wing: Yellow; Southeast wing: Black; Southwest wing: Blue) The doorways were originally the only locations on the upper stories where color decorations were used.

The offices themselves typically have floors covered with tile or carpeting; drywall or metal walls; and dropped-tile ceilings. The mechanical systems are embedded in the ceilings. Offices along each floor's perimeter are illuminated by the windows, which could be blocked off with Venetian blinds. Window-facing offices were seldom assigned to ordinary HUD workers, and the size and location of a worker's office was dictated by how high-ranking their job position was. Originally, HUD furnished the offices with furniture from its previous buildings. The offices were constructed with metal walls, which had magnetic fasteners for employees' personal decorations; within a decade of the building's completion, some of these had been replaced with orange or pale-blue drywall partitions.

On all except the fourth and eighth floors, there are conference rooms adjoining the freight elevator lobbies. The conference rooms accommodate 16 to 30 people and were initially well-patronized, as the building had not been constructed with an auditorium. The conference rooms all have carpeted floors, plywood wall panels, and dropped ceilings. On the fourth to ninth floors, the southern portion of the spine (behind the south elevator lobby) has an executive suite with a reception area, offices, and conference rooms. The executive suites were built with more elaborate finishes, such as carpeted floors, birchwood doors with steel and brass hardware, and paneled wooden walls. On the tenth floor is the HUD executive office, which originally accommodated a conference room and spaces for HUD's secretary and deputy secretary, along with security booths outside the secretary's and deputy secretary's offices.

The second floor originally had a pantry and cafeteria (later converted to offices), while the third floor has a snack bar and credit union. In addition, the seventh floor has a health and fitness suite, and the eighth floor has a library, although both are heavily modified from the original design. As planned, there was supposed to be a printing plant for HUD on the fourth floor, but this floor instead had a data processing area.

== Impact and legacy ==
=== Building commentary ===
==== Contemporary ====
When the building was being planned in 1963, Architectural Record wrote that the plans were unlike "those recent Washington buildings that look as if they were the inexorable result of circumstances beyond anyone's control." Ada Louise Huxtable, writing for The New York Times, said the same year that Breuer's "best is anticipated in the capital", the HHFA building in Washington, D.C., despite bureaucratic issues surrounding his previous commission for the Bronx campus of Hunter College in New York City. Architectural Review magazine wrote in 1965 that the HUD building and several other federal modernist structures in Washington, D.C., showed that the U.S. government was beginning to commission high-quality buildings domestically, not just abroad. Wolf Von Eckardt wrote in early 1968 that Breuer's HUD and Whitney Museum buildings were "among our era's finest gifts to posterity", though he later described the HUD corridors as depressing and criticized the "humdrum interior design and furnishings". Industrial Design magazine said that the building was cost-efficient and tastefully engineered despite comparing it to an "awfully austere" hotel.

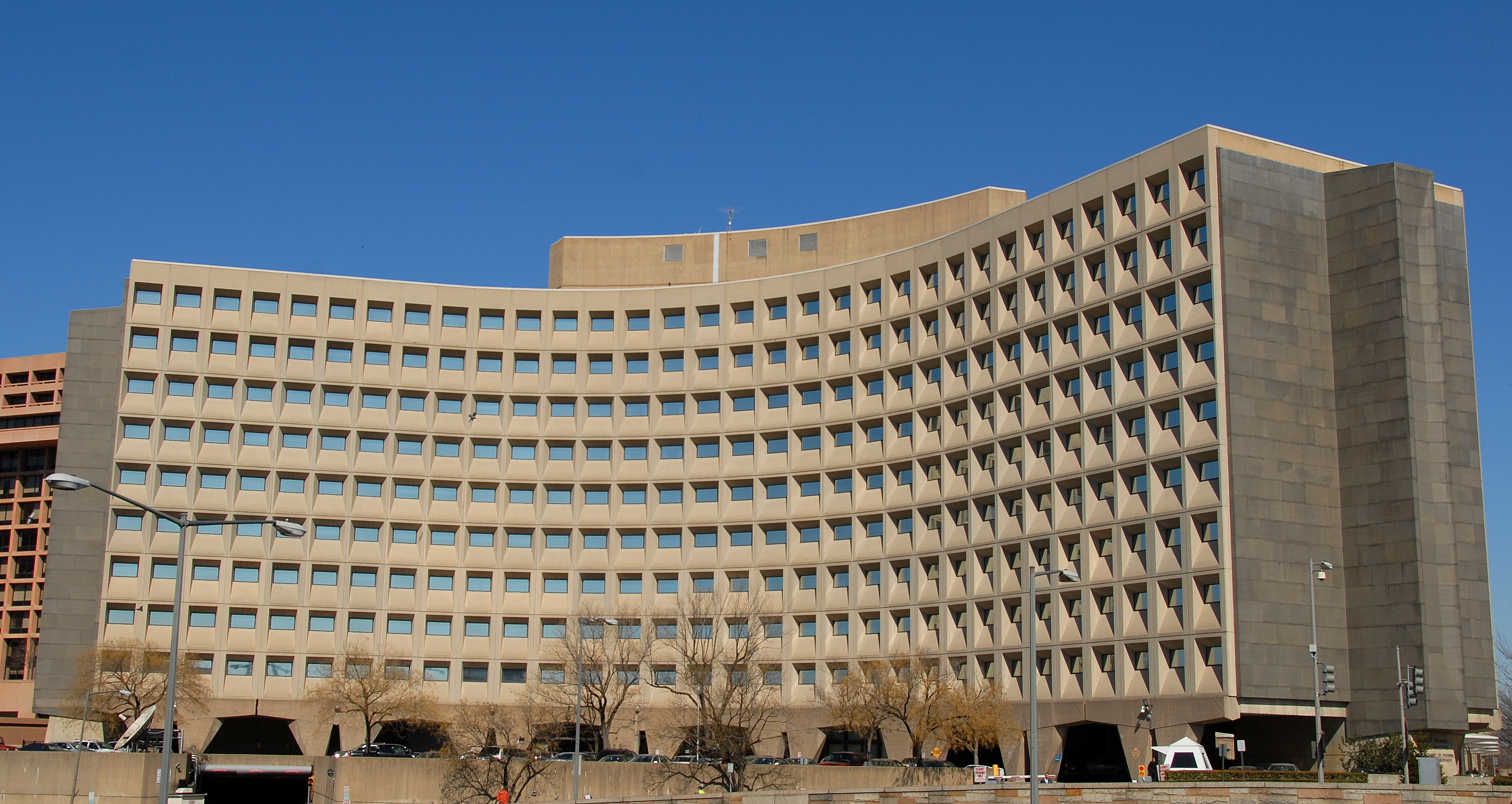
Breuer received architectural praise for the completed design.

Breuer received architectural praise for the completed design, which he considered among the "serious work" that he preferred to talk about in his later life. At the structure's dedication, President Johnson declared it "bold and beautiful", Secretary Weaver said it was "urban and urbane", and GSA Administrator Lawson B. Knott Jr. praised it as "a lasting architectural asset to our capital city and our country". Huxtable and The Wall Street Journal both praised the building's unconventional style, and Architectural Forum described the building as cost-efficient and well-lit, despite the likelihood that HUD would quickly outgrow the structure. In a 1968 book, George Mansell wrote that the building "was judged unconventional and noteworthy" for its elongated X-shaped plan. Architectural Record magazine wrote that the GSA's Public Building Service had ranked the HUD building as among the best civic structures commissioned during Kennedy's and Johnson's presidencies. The Washington Daily News said the HUD building, L'Enfant Plaza, and other nearby structures "fit together in a sort of national harmony", and The Christian Science Monitor said the HUD and L'Enfant Plaza developments were evidence that "Washington architecture is improving—at last". The design was, by one account, praised nationwide "as a turning point for public architecture".

Employees did not like the building, calling it the "Federal Hilton". The 7th Street plaza was a particular target of criticism due to its unwelcoming design. HUD executive Lawrence O. Houstoun Jr. said in 1977 that "there is nothing big enough and green enough to soften the overall image of concreteness", despite personally finding the HUD Building to have withstood usage patterns well. According to Houstoun, longtime HUD employees had become inured to the design by then, though new hires and visitors criticized the building more harshly. The interior spaces were also strongly critiqued by the late 1970s. According to the Project for Public Spaces, which studied the building on HUD's behalf:

The lack of welcome extends into the building lobbies, where there is a need for information of nearly every kind.... there are no public maps; outdoor directional signs are too few and too small; the Metro signposts are so discreet they are hard to find;...there is no indication of where visitors should enter; the entrances are hard to find;...the main reception desk is in the south lobby, though more people enter through the north; information boards are not where people look for them; house phones are not clearly labeled; cafeteria entrances and the HUD information center are hidden. Finally, the lobbies themselves are so dimly lit—especially in contrast to the glaring front plaza—that this, too, adds to the confusion.

==== Retrospective ====
The Weaver Building has been cited as an example of Breuer's brutalist aesthetic, an example of the versatility of Breuer's designs, and a masterpiece of Modern architecture. The writers Frederick Albert Gutheim and Antoinette J. Lee said it "set new civic standards for architectural design". In 1998, a Washington Post architectural critic called the building "impressive...a brooding, strangely graceful concrete honeycomb." The architecture critic Carole Rifkind called it "compelling by virtue of the swaggering efficiency of the construction system", and The Guardian described the massing and pilotis as contributing to the aesthetic. The writer Isabelle Hyman said that the "structural innovations and creative technology" of both the Weaver and Humphrey buildings received frequent praise from architects, but said the Weaver Building's arcade was unwelcoming and the structure as a whole was "ungainly". A Washington Post reporter said in 2021 that Breuer "appears to have defied humanity" with the design, specifically citing the grid-like facade and the plaza's canopies. Robinson & Associates said the building's location, in a redevelopment area, itself was a metaphor for HUD's greater role in American urban renewal programs. Atomic Ranch magazine said that the base's pilotis and the curved facade helped counteract the building's heavy appearance.

After its completion, the Weaver Building continued to generate resentment from the public.

The Weaver Building continued to generate resentment from the public. One historian of urban planning called the building an "out-of-towner's 'ego trip'", while another writer said the building's "huge muscular forms" were viewed dubiously by the public. An architectural critic for The Washington Times wrote in 2007 that the Weaver and Humphrey buildings were "two of the ugliest buildings in town" and that Breuer's designs were "stark, unfriendly buildings fronted by empty plazas". Bradford McKee wrote in the Washington City Paper that the building appeared detached from its environs, comparing its pilotis to rhinoceros feet, and another writer for the same newspaper said that the facade's design made it so that "individual enterprise is reduced to peepholes in a waffle of concrete panels". Critics also said that Breuer's design was unoriginal, essentially mimicking his earlier UNESCO Headquarters and IBM La Gaude. A writer for Reason magazine said that "the housing bureaucracy's headquarters is built on razed homes", criticizing its existence.

The building received criticism from HUD secretaries under multiple U.S. presidential administrations. Jack Kemp, who served as secretary under George H. W. Bush, once described the building as "10 floors of basement". One of his successors—Shaun Donovan, appointed by Barack Obama—called it "among the most reviled in all of Washington—and with good reason". Scott Turner, HUD's secretary under Donald Trump's second administration, characterized it as "the ugliest building in D.C." Trump, in the final days of his first presidency, signed an executive order criticizing Brutalism and specifically Breuer's Weaver and Humphrey buildings; his successor Joe Biden revoked the order.

Some of the criticism originated from the building's style. A writer for the Architectural Record said in 2024 that the negative sentiment toward the Weaver Building was part of a trend of antipathy toward brutalist-style U.S. federal buildings. The next year, The New York Times Magazine said that negative reception of structures such as the Weaver Building and Boston City Hall had worsened public resentment toward brutalism. When the Weaver Building was proposed for demolition, a writer for The Guardian said the move was part of Trump's efforts to reform the architecture of Washington, D.C., in the more classical styles that he preferred, criticizing the plans as a potential loss of national heritage.

=== Plaza commentary ===
The building's original plaza was roundly criticized by HUD employees; in a 1979 survey of HUD staff, none of the respondents had any positive commentary. The plaza as a whole was bleak and unwelcoming, as the Project for Public Spaces wrote in a study that HUD had commissioned for the building. Signage, lighting, identification of entrances, and the regulation of pedestrian traffic in the plaza were characterized as a "disaster" due to their extremely poor quality. The building had very little grass or garden space where employees could eat or relax during lunch, and very little of that planted space contained seating, causing extensive employee resentment. The garden areas had such small trash containers that they overflowed every workday afternoon.

The Schwartz-designed plaza received mixed commentary. The Washington City Paper and Architecture: the AIA Journal both criticized the final design as watered-down, stating that the original proposal for multicolored canopies was preferable to the white canopies that were actually installed. A Washington Post writer similarly said that the canopies had been envisioned as "Froot Loops, not Frosted Cheerios", and that the plaza would have benefited from additional color. Observers also compared the canopies to flying saucers or UFOs. The canopies have been criticized for being too far from the round seating area/planters and not close enough to the street, thus rendering them useless as the shelter they were designed to be. The Project for Public Spaces rated the plaza the eighth-worst public plaza in the world in 2004. By contrast, The Washington Post said the canopies provide "a pleasant shock", comparing the canopies to spaceships overlooking the planting areas and lawns.

=== Awards and media ===
The Washington Board of Trade gave the building an architectural award in 1969. The Weaver Building and other brutalist buildings in the District of Columbia were depicted in a 2023 exhibit at the Southern Utah Museum of Art, which was moved in 2025 to the National Building Museum. The Weaver Building had been selected for that exhibit specifically for its curving floor plan and its shape. As part of the exhibit, Los Angeles architectural firm Brooks + Scarpa presented a design for a possible adaptive reuse project for the building.

== See also ==
- Architecture of Washington, D.C.
- List of Brutalist architecture in the United States
- List of Marcel Breuer works
- National Register of Historic Places listings in central Washington, D.C.
