= Federal modernism =

20th-century American architectural style

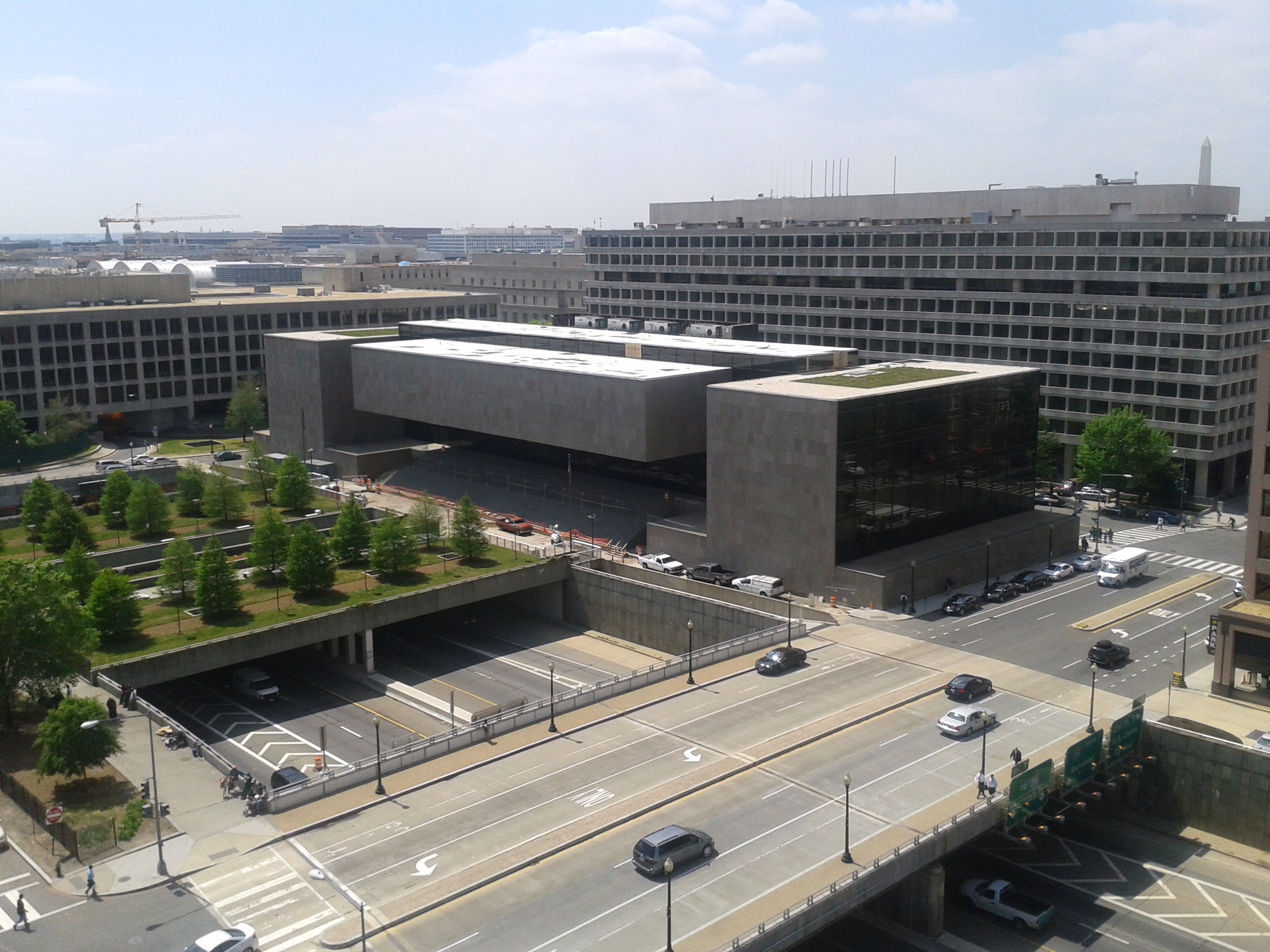
United States Tax Court Building, Washington, D.C.

Federal modernism is an architectural style which emerged in the twentieth century encompassing various styles of modern architecture used in the design of federal buildings in the United States. Federal buildings in this style shunned ornamentation, focusing instead on functional efficiency and low costs. There is no universally accepted start date for federal modernism, with some early variants of modernism emerging as early as the 1920s, but the term is most often associated with the buildings built by the U.S. General Services Administration (GSA) in the 1950s through 1970s. Prominent architects associated with federal modernism include Ludwig Mies van der Rohe, Marcel Breuer, Walter Gropius, and Victor Lundy. Federal modernism has been criticized by some architects and politicians, including Donald Trump, either because they believe it lacks "authority" or due to a perceived lack of beauty.

== History ==
Prior to the American Revolution, colonial America derived its public buildings from architectural styles and practices of Great Britain. After gaining independence, the American republic was influenced and inspired by classical Roman and Greek forms, representing the democratic ideals of law and citizenship of a new nation.

In 1852, after the population tripled in numbers, the Office of Construction and Office of the Supervising Architect were established under the Treasury Department to oversee federal design and construction and make the process more efficient and timely. Designs in this period moved away from classicism toward other styles like Renaissance Revival, and emphasized centralization and standardization.

While there is no universally accepted start date for federal modernism, in the early twentieth century the materials and building methods used in federal buildings changed, and reflected the styles of early modernism. These buildings utilized clean lines, flat surfaces, and simple geometric shapes, lacking the ornamentation prevalent in classical architecture. While classicism asserted permanence and authority, modernism celebrated innovation and freedom with its steel and glass materials.

During the New Deal, approximately 1,300 federally funded buildings were constructed nationwide in a simplified classic style. Sometimes referred to as "modern classic" or "stripped classic mode, the "style was so named because the basic form and symmetry of classicism were retained, but much of the ornamentation and motifs were reduced or removed."

After the General Services Administration (GSA) was established in 1949 to "provide the resources needed by U.S. agencies to accomplish their missions," federal buildings reflected an emphasis on functionalism rather than ornamentation. Federal modernism is most closely associated with the GSA buildings constructed between the 1950s and 1970s, which embodied this philosophy. Trends of functionalism included individual offices becoming less common while large open "universal" spaces became more common.

== Characteristics ==
Lacking the ornamentation and ceremonial spaces of earlier styles, federal modernism instead incorporated sharp edges and emphasized functionality and efficiency. It often involved the use of many prefabricated elements, and inexpensive materials such as aluminum, concrete, and plastic. The lower cost of building in the modernist style helped it become widespread. With these changes, federal buildings began to resemble private office buildings, and it became challenging to differentiate between public and private structures in communities.

Modernist philosophy and the rapid pace of technological advancement led to buildings being constructed with intended lifespans of only 20–30 years, instead of centuries like their predecessors, due to "economics" and the "increasing requirements of comfort demanded by people". This has led to many questions over whether it makes sense for the GSA to continually maintain and reinvest in these buildings as they age.

From the 1950s to 1970s, various styles of modern architecture were commonly used in federal buildings. These include International Style, New Formalism, Brutalism, and Expressionism.

== Architects ==
Private architecture firms, along with government architects, produced designs in the federal modernist style for office buildings, courthouses, post offices, border stations, and museums. As a result of the inclusion of private firms, the demarcation between government and private architecture diminished.

Architects associated with federal modernism include prominent American modernist architects of the mid-twentieth century including Ludwig Mies van der Rohe, Marcel Breuer, Walter Gropius, and Victor Lundy.

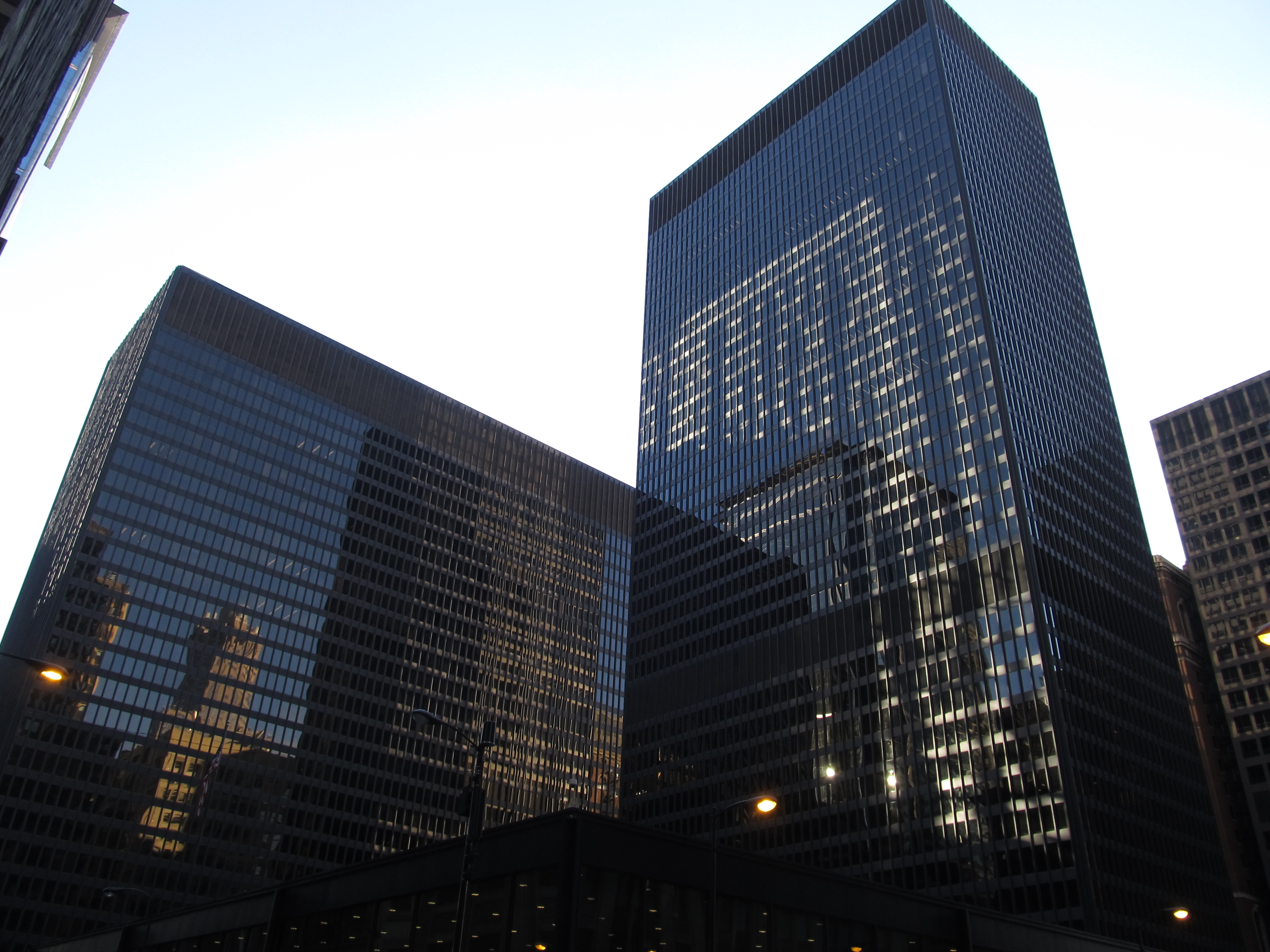
Kluczynski Federal Building and Dirksen United States Courthouse, Chicago, Illinois

=== Mies van der Rohe ===
Ludwig Mies van der Rohe was the chief designer of the Chicago Federal Center (also known as the Chicago Federal Complex) in Chicago, Illinois. He worked alongside the architects of the firms of Schmidt, Garden and Erikson, C.F. Murphy Associates, and A. Epstein and Sons. The construction took place between 1960–1974. The complex includes three buildings: the 45-story John C. Kluczynski Federal Building, the Everett McKinley Dirksen United States Courthouse, and a post office between these two towers. A sculpture by Alexander Calder, Flamingo, is installed in the complex's central plaza.

=== Walter Gropius and The Architects Collaborative ===
Walter Gropius, founder of the Bauhaus School, along with The Architects Collaborative, designed the John F. Kennedy Federal Building located at 15 Sudbury Street, Boston, Massachusetts.

Robert C. Weaver Federal Building, Washington, D.C

=== Marcel Breuer ===
Marcel Breuer, who worked with Mies van der Rohe and Gropius as part of the Bauhaus School, designed the Robert C. Weaver Federal Building in Washington D.C. located at 451 7th Street, SW. It housed the headquarters of the U.S. Department of Housing and Urban Development. Breuer also designed the Hubert H. Humphrey Building for the United States Department of Health, Education and Welfare.

=== Victor Lundy ===
In 1965, Victor Lundy designed the U.S. Tax Court Building located at 400 2nd Street NW, Washington, D.C., and it is listed on the National Register of Historic Places.

== Reception ==
In 2007, some architects invited by the GSA to a forum complained that modernist courthouses did not have as much "gravitas, order and authority" as those built in the classical style.

Responses to federal modernism became subject to partisan bickering; in 2020, Donald Trump signed an executive order disapproving of modernism in federal buildings due to its perceived lack of beauty. Joe Biden subsequently overturned that executive order in 2021. And in response to Biden's executive order, Republicans in Congress introduced legislation in 2023 that would discourage the use of modernist architecture and instead favor classicism in federal building design.
