= List of housing statutes =

Legal scholars and practitioners generally discuss laws that affect housing within the context of real property, landlord–tenant law, mortgage law, laws that forbid housing discrimination, laws that attempt to preserve affordable housing, etc.

The following is a list of housing-related statutes in different countries.

== Canada ==
Name	Date	Scope	Jurisdiction	Description
Miscellaneous Statutes (Housing Priority Initiatives) Amendment Act	2016		BC	
The Cooperative Housing Strategy Act	2014	Cooperative housing	MB	
Ontario Condominium Act, 1998	1998	Condominiums	ON	
Fairness is a Two-Way Street Act			ON	
Heritage Places Protection Act		Heritage properties	PEI	
Heritage Property Act		Heritage properties	NS	
Heritage Property Act		Heritage properties	SK	
Housing and Renewal Corporation Act	2010		MB	
Jesuit Estates Act	1888		QC	
Land Purchase Act	1875	Land purchase	PEI	
Mortgage Brokerages, Lenders and Administrators Act			ON	
National Housing Act			Federal	
Ontario Heritage Act			ON	
Property Transfer Tax Act		Property transfer tax	BC	
Protecting Condominium Owners Act, 2015			ON	
Real Estate and Business Brokers Act			ON	
Régie du logement			QC	
Residential Tenancies Act		Residential tenancy	AB	
Residential Tenancies Act, 2006	2006	Residential tenancy	ON	
Residential Tenancies Act (Manitoba)	1990	Residential tenancy	MB	
Strata Property Act			BC	
Trespass to Property Act		Trespassing	ON	Provincial codification of the common law. Used by private-property owners to keep individuals off their property.

== New Zealand ==
Name	Date	Scope	Description
Land Transfer Act 1952	1952	Land transfers	Implements the Torrens title system of land registration

== United Kingdom ==
Name	Date	Scope	Jurisdiction	Description
Land Transfer Act 1875	1875	Land transfers	UK	
Housing Grants, Construction and Regeneration Act 1996	1996		UK	(omnibus legislation)
Commonhold and Leasehold Reform Act 2002	2002		ENG; WLS	Introduced common holds – a new way of owning land; similar to condominiums – into English and Welsh law.
Artisans' and Labourers' Dwellings Improvement Act 1875	1875		UK	
Building Act 1984	1984		ENG; WLS	
Cost of Living (Tenant Protection) (Scotland) Act 2022	2022		SCT	
Erection of Cottages Act 1588	1588		ENG	
Fire Safety Act 2021	2021		ENG; WLS	
Housing (Financial and Miscellaneous Provisions) Act 1946	1946		NIR	
Housing (Financial Provisions) Act 1924				
Housing (Scotland) Act 2014	2014		SCT	
Housing Acts of 1930, 1933, 1935, 1969, 1980, 1985, 1988, 1996, 2004	Various		UK	
Housing and Regeneration Act 2008	2008			Establishes the Homes and Communities Agency, abolishes the Urban Regeneration Agency, the Commission for the New Towns and the Housing Corporation, regulates social housing, and also covers other aspects of housing law.
Housing of the Working Classes Act 1885, 1890, 1900	Various			
Land Charges Act 1972				
Land Registration Act 1925				
Land Registration Act 2002				
Law of Property Act 1925				
Leasehold Reform (Ground Rent) Act 2022				
Metropolitan Houseless Poor Act 1864				
Settled Land Acts				
Sustainable and Secure Buildings Act 2004				
Trusts of Land and Appointment of Trustees Act 1996				
Vagrancy Act 1824				

== United States ==
Name	Date	Scope	Jurisdiction	Description
Height of Buildings Act of 1899	1899	Height limits	D.C.	Created height restrictions because of concerns with new construction technology, notably steel, iron, and thin veneer facades.
Height of Buildings Act of 1910	1910	Height limits	D.C.	Created height limits in Washington, D.C.
Federal Home Loan Bank Act	1932	Mortgages	Federal	Created Federal Home Loan Bank Board to charter and supervise federal savings and loans. Created Federal Home Loan Banks which lend to building and loan associations and other banking institutions to finance home mortgages.
National Housing Act of 1934	1934	Mortgages	Federal	part of New Deal to make housing and home mortgages more affordable. Created the Federal Housing Administration (FHA) and the Federal Savings and Loan Insurance Corporation (FSLIC).
Housing Act of 1937 (aka Wagner-Steagall Act)	1937	Public Housing	Federal	Provided for subsidies to be paid from the U.S. government to local public housing agencies (LHAs) to improve living conditions for low-income families.
Housing Act of 1949	1949		Federal	
Housing Act of 1954	1954	Public housing	Federal	Was to provide 140,000 units of public housing with preferential treatment to families relocated for slum eradication or revitalization.
Rumford Fair Housing Act	1963	Discrimination	CA	Preceded Fair Housing Act, but repealed.
Housing and Urban Development Act of 1965	1965		Federal	
Housing and Urban Development Act of 1968	1968	Mortgages	Federal	Established Ginnie Mae to expand availability of mortgage funds for moderate income families using government-guaranteed mortgage-backed securities. The new entity was split from the former Fannie Mae, which retained other functions.
Fire Research and Safety Act of 1968	1968	Fire safety	Federal	
Fair Housing Act	1968	Discrimination	Federal	Intended to protect the buyer or renter of a dwelling from seller or landlord discrimination.
Housing and Urban Development Act of 1970	1970		Federal	
Uniform Relocation Assistance and Real Property Acquisition Act (1970)	1970		Federal	
Housing and Community Development Act of 1974	1974	Affordable housing	Federal	Amended the Housing Act of 1937 to create Section 8 housing
Real Estate Settlement Procedures Act	1974	Buyer protection	Federal	Created to educate and protect prospective home buyers by adding disclosure requirements and eliminating kickbacks and referral fees to realty services.
Federal Fire Prevention and Control Act of 1974	1974	Fire safety	Federal	
Mobile Home Construction and Safety Standards Act of 1974	1974	Mobile home safety	Federal	Established design and development safety standards for manufactured housing or prefabricated homes.
Home Mortgage Disclosure Act	1975	Mortgages; Discrimination	Federal	
Community Reinvestment Act	1977			
Alternative Mortgage Transaction Parity Act of 1982	1982	Mortgages	Federal	
McKinney–Vento Homeless Assistance Act	1987		Federal	
Housing and Community Development Act of 1987	1987		Federal	
Federal Housing Enterprises Financial Safety and Soundness Act of 1992	1992		Federal	
Home Ownership and Equity Protection Act of 1994	1994	Mortgages	Federal	
Riegle-Neal Interstate Banking and Branching Efficiency Act of 1994	1994	Mortgages	Federal	
Mortgage Forgiveness Debt Relief Act of 2007	2007	Mortgages	Federal	
Housing and Economic Recovery Act of 2008	2008		Federal	Commonly referred to as HERA, and designed primarily to address the subprime mortgage crisis of 2007
American Recovery and Reinvestment Act of 2009	2009		Federal	
Fraud Enforcement and Recovery Act of 2009	2009		Federal	
Helping Families Save Their Homes Act of 2009	2009		Federal	
HOME STAR	2009		Federal	
Mortgage Choice Act of 2013	2013	Mortgages	Federal	
Public Law 113-167	2014		Federal	
Home Equity Theft Prevention Act	2006		NY	A New York State law passed in 2006 to provide homeowners with information about the homeowner’s property, particularly when homeowners are in default on their mortgage payments
