= Housing Act =

Housing Act is a common title of Acts of national legislatures in many common law countries, and may refer to:

== Canada ==
- National Housing Act (Canada)

== United Kingdom ==
The Housing Act is a stock title used for Acts of Parliament in the United Kingdom relating to housing. The following Acts of Parliament are Housing Acts passed in the United Kingdom:

- Housing Act 1930 (20 & 21 Geo. 5. c. 39), (also known as the Greenwood Act)
- Housing (Financial Provisions) Act 1933 (23 & 24 Geo. 5. c. 15)
- Housing Act 1935 (25 & 26 Geo. 5. c. 40)
- Housing Act 1936 (26 Geo. 5 & 1 Edw. 8. c. 51)
- Housing Act 1957 (5 & 6 Eliz. 2. c. 56)
- Housing Act 1961 (9 & 10 Eliz. 2. c. 65)
- Housing Act 1969 (c. 33)
- Housing Act 1980 (c. 51)
- Housing Act 1985 (c. 68)
- Housing Act 1988 (c. 50)
- Housing Act 1996 (c. 52)
- Housing Act 2004 (c. 34)

Housing Act may also refer to

- Housing (Wales) Measure 2011 (nawm 5), a measure of the National Assembly for Wales
- Housing (Wales) Act 2014 (anaw 7), an act of the National Assembly for Wales
- Housing (Scotland) Act 2014 (asp 14), an act of the Scottish Parliament

The term Housing Act is occasionally also used to refer to housing-related United Kingdom public health legislation:

- Housing of the Working Classes Act 1885 (48 & 49 Vict. c. 72)
- Housing of the Working Classes Act 1890 (53 & 54 Vict. c. 70)
- Housing of the Working Classes Act 1900 (63 & 64 Vict. c. 59)

Housing and Planning Act may refer to:

- Housing and Planning Act 1986 (c. 63)
- Housing and Planning Act 2016 (c. 22)

== United States ==
- Housing Act of 1937
- Housing Act of 1949
- Housing Act of 1954
- Housing Act of 1961
- National Housing Act of 1934
- Fair Housing Act (enacted as Title VIII of the Civil Rights Act of 1968)
- Housing and Community Development Act of 1974
- Housing and Community Development Act of 1987
- Housing and Economic Recovery Act of 2008
- Housing and Urban Development Act of 1965
- Housing and Urban Development Act of 1968
- Housing and Urban Development Act of 1970
- Housing for Older Persons Act, 1995

== See also ==
- Housing and Community Development Act (disambiguation)
