= Subsidized housing in the United States =

Rental assistance for low-income households

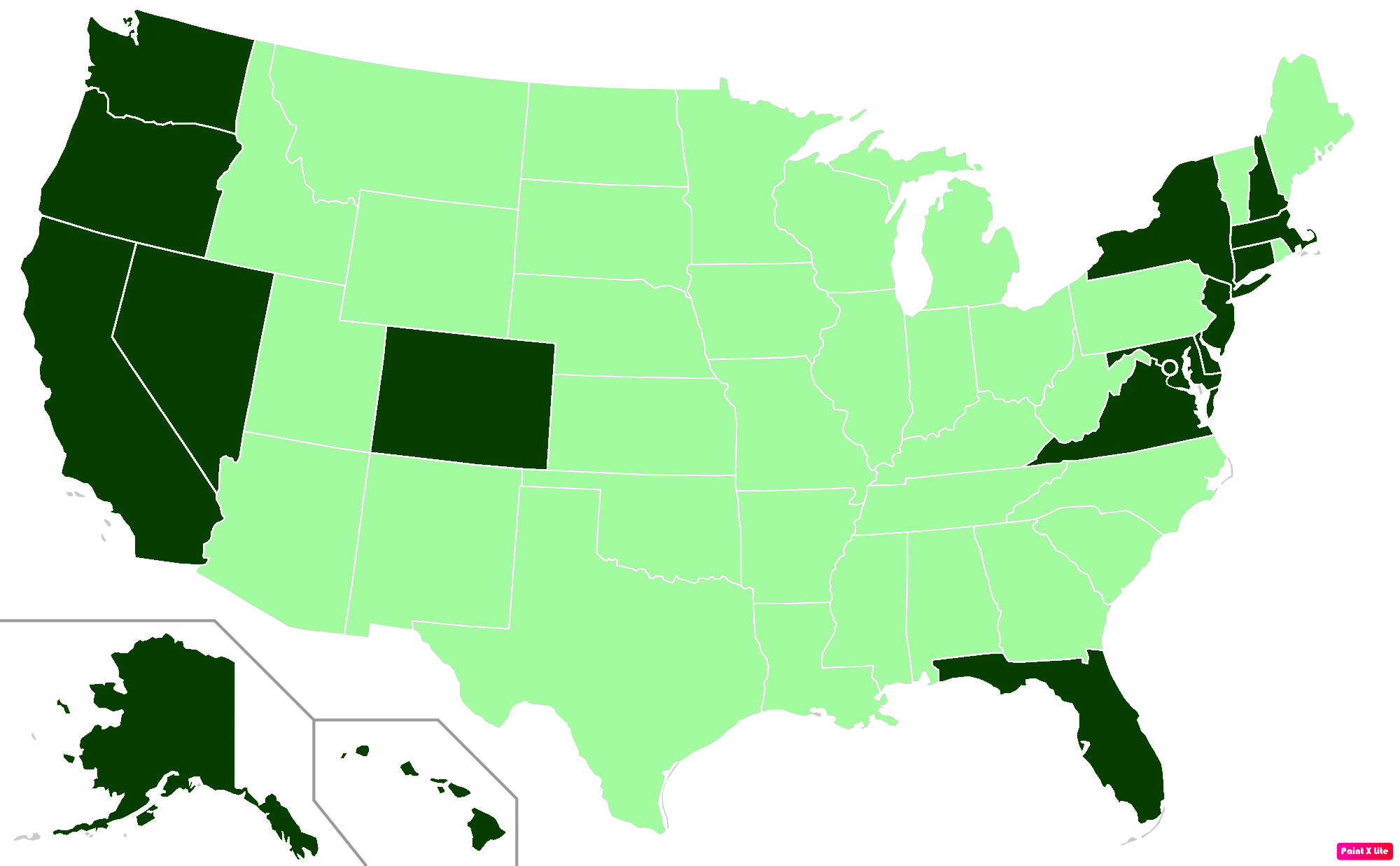
Median gross rent by state from 2015 to 2019 American Community Survey estimates published by the U.S. Census Bureau. States with median gross rents higher than the United States average are in dark green.

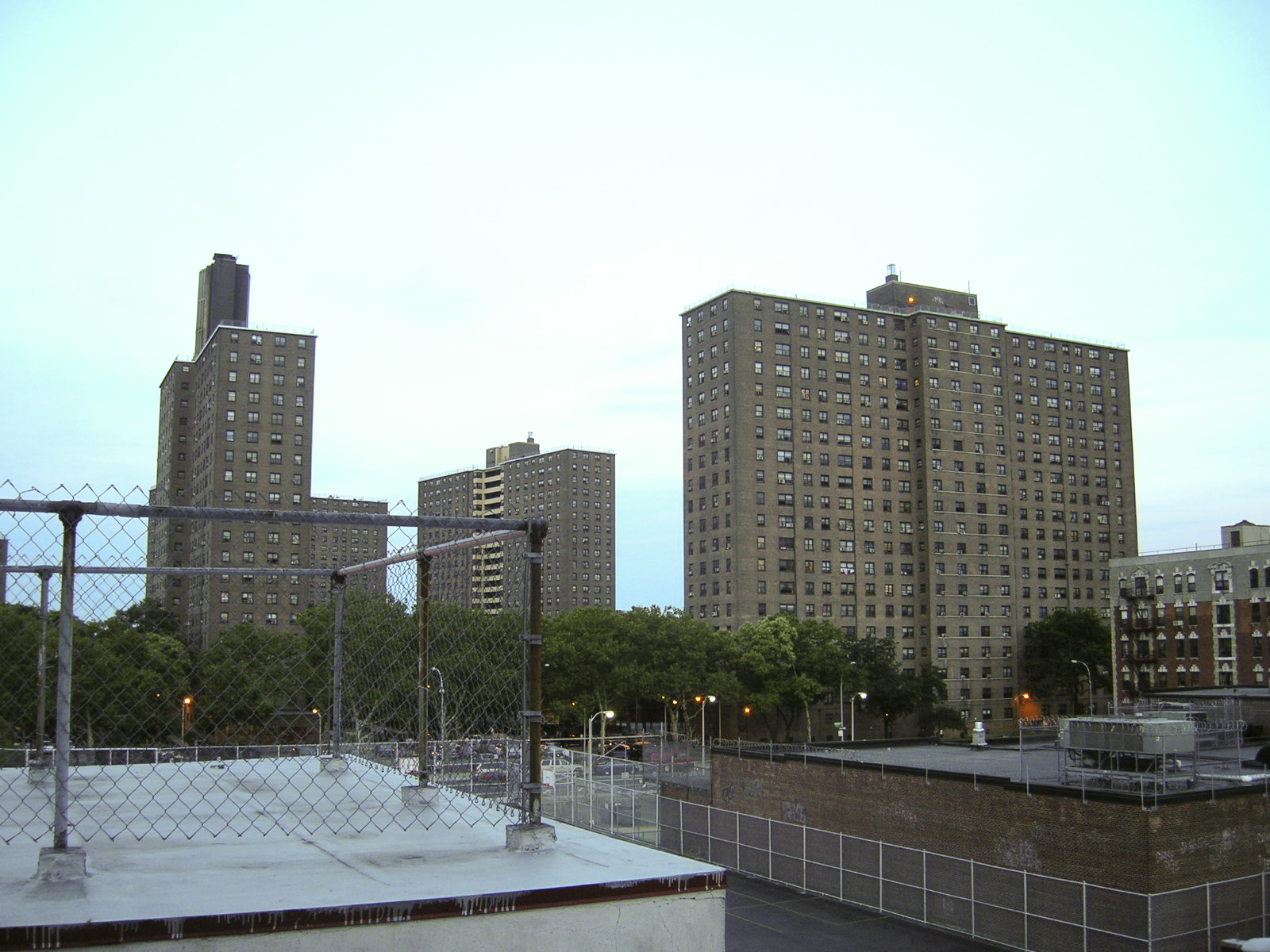
The 13 and 20-story John F. Hylan Houses in the Bushwick neighborhood of Brooklyn, New York City

In the United States, subsidized housing is administered by federal, state and local agencies to provide subsidized rental assistance for low-income households. Public housing is priced much below the market rate, allowing people to live in more convenient locations rather than move away from the city in search of lower rents. In most federally-funded rental assistance programs, the tenants' monthly rent is set at 30% of their household income. Now increasingly provided in a variety of settings and formats, originally public housing in the U.S. consisted primarily of one or more concentrated blocks of low-rise and/or high-rise apartment buildings. These complexes are operated by state and local housing authorities which are authorized and funded by the United States Department of Housing and Urban Development (HUD). In 2020, there were one million public housing units. In 2022, about 5.2 million American households received some form of federal rental assistance.

Subsidized apartment buildings, often referred to as housing projects (or simply "the projects"), have a complicated and often notorious history in the United States. While the first decades of projects were built with higher construction standards and a broader range of incomes and same applicants, over time, public housing increasingly became the housing of last resort in many cities. Several reasons have been cited for this negative trend including the failure of Congress to provide sufficient funding, a lowering of standards for occupancy, and mismanagement at the local level. In the United States, the federal government provides funding for public housing from two different sources: the Capital Fund and the Operating Fund. According to the HUD, the Capital Fund subsidizes housing authorities to renovate and refurbish public housing developments; meanwhile, the Operating Fund provides funds to housing authorities in order to assist in maintenance and operating costs of public housing. Furthermore, housing projects have also been seen to greatly increase concentrated poverty in a community, leading to several negative externalities. Crime, drug usage, and educational under-performance are all widely associated with housing projects, particularly in urban areas.

As a result of their various problems and diminished political support, many of the traditional low-income public housing properties constructed in the earlier years of the program have been demolished. Beginning primarily in the 1970s the federal government turned to other approaches including the Project-Based Section 8 program, Section 8 certificates, and the Housing Choice Voucher Program. In the 1990s the federal government accelerated the transformation of traditional public housing through HUD's HOPE VI Program. Hope VI funds are used to tear down distressed public housing projects and replace them with mixed communities constructed in cooperation with private partners. In 2012, Congress and HUD initiated a new program called the Rental Assistance Demonstration (RAD) program. Under the demonstration program, eligible public housing properties are redeveloped in conjunction with private developers and investors.

The federal government, through its Low-Income Housing Tax Credit program (which in 2012 paid for construction of 90% of all subsidized rental housing in the US), spends $6 billion per year to finance 50,000 low-income rental units annually, with median costs per unit for new construction (2011–2015) ranging from $126,000 in Texas to $326,000 in California.

== History ==
=== Early efforts ===
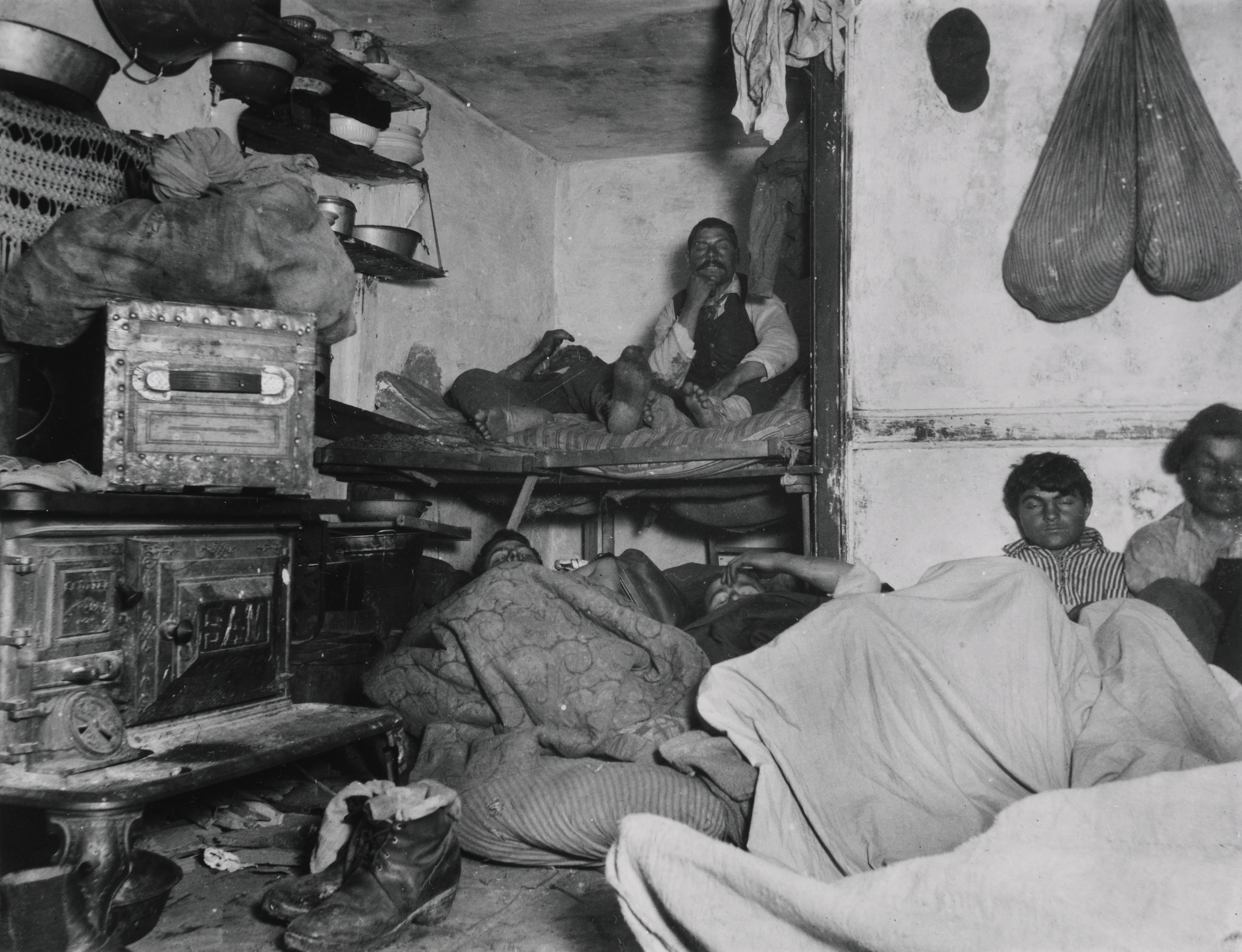
Photograph of New York City tenement lodgings by Jacob Riis for How the Other Half Lives, first published in 1890

In the 19th and early 20th centuries, government involvement in housing for the poor was chiefly in the area of building code enforcement, requiring new buildings to meet certain standards for decent livability (e.g. proper ventilation), and forcing landlords to make some modifications to existing building stock. Photojournalist Jacob Riis' How the Other Half Lives (1890) brought considerable attention the conditions of the slums in New York City, sparking new attention to housing conditions around the country.

Early tenement reform was primarily a philanthropic venture, with Model Tenements built as early as the 1870s which attempted to use new architectural and management models to address the physical and social problems of the slums. These attempts were limited by available resources, and early efforts were soon redirected towards building code reform. The New York Tenement Act of 1895 and Tenement Law of 1901 were early attempts to address building codes in New York City, which were then copied in Chicago, Philadelphia, and other American cities.

In 1910, the National Housing Association (NHA) was created to improve housing conditions in urban and suburban neighborhoods through the enactment of better regulation and increased awareness. The NHA was founded by Lawrence Veiller, author of Model Tenement House Law (1910), and consisted of delegates from dozens of cities. Over time, the focus of the housing movement shifted from a focus on proper building typology to community development on a broader scale, and the NHA dissolved in 1936.

The City of Milwaukee, under mayor Daniel Hoan, implemented the country's first public housing project, known as Garden Homes, in 1923. This experiment with a municipally-sponsored housing cooperative saw initial success, but was plagued by development and land acquisition problems, and the board overseeing the project dissolved the Gardens Home Corporation just two years after construction on the homes was completed.

=== Public Works Administration (PWA) Housing Division ===
Permanent, federally funded housing came into being in the United States as a part of Franklin Roosevelt's New Deal. Title II, Section 202 of the National Industrial Recovery Act, passed June 16, 1933, directed the Public Works Administration (PWA) to develop a program for the "construction, reconstruction, alteration, or repair under public regulation or control of low-cost housing and slum clearance projects ...". Led by the Housing Division of the PWA and headed by architect Robert Kohn, the initial, Limited-Dividend Program aimed to provide low-interest loans to public or private groups to fund the construction of low-income housing.

Too few qualified applicants stepped forward, and the Limited-Dividend Program funded only seven housing projects nationally. In the spring of 1934, PWA Administrator Harold Ickes directed the Housing Division to undertake the direct construction of public housing, a decisive step that would serve as a precedent for the 1937 Wagner–Steagall Housing Act, and the permanent public housing program in the United States. Kohn stepped down during the reorganization, and between 1934 and 1937 the Housing Division, now headed by Colonel Horatio B. Hackett, constructed fifty-two housing projects across the United States, as well as Puerto Rico and the Virgin Islands. Atlanta's Techwood Homes opened on 1 September 1936 and was the first of the fifty-two opened.

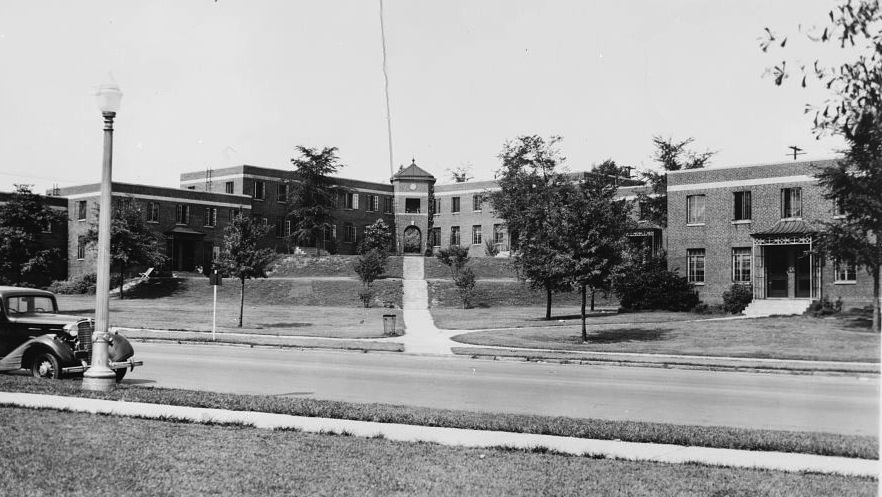
Techwood Homes in Atlanta, first U.S. public housing project opened in 1936

Based on the residential planning concepts of Clarence Stein and Henry Wright, these fifty-two projects are architecturally cohesive, with composed on one to four story row house and apartment buildings, arranged around open spaces, creating traffic-free play spaces that defined community life. Many of these projects were built on slum land, but land acquisition proved difficult, so abandoned industrial sites and vacant land were also purchased. Lexington's two early projects were constructed on an abandoned horse racing track. At Ickes' direction, many of these projects were also segregated, designed and built for either whites or African-Americans. Race was largely determined by the neighborhood surrounding the site, as American residential patterns, in both the North and South, were highly segregated.

Coming out of the housing movement at the turn of the century, the 1930s also saw the creation of the Home Owners' Loan Corporation (HOLC), which refinanced loans in order to keep the housing market afloat. The National Housing Act of 1934 created the Federal Housing Administration (FHA), which used only a small capital investment from the federal government to insure mortgages. Construction of public housing projects were therefore only one portion of the federal housing efforts during the Great Depression.

=== Housing Act of 1937 ===
In 1937, the Wagner-Steagall Housing Act replaced the temporary PWA Housing Division with a permanent, quasi-autonomous agency to administer housing. The new United States Housing Authority Housing Act of 1937 would operate with a strong bent towards local efforts in locating and constructing housing and would place caps on how much could be spent per housing unit. The cap of $5,000 was a hotly contested feature of the bill as it would be a considerable reduction of the money spent on PWA housing and was far less than advocates of the bill had lobbied to get.

Construction of housing projects dramatically accelerated under the new structure. In 1939 alone, 50,000 housing units were constructed—more than twice as many as were built during the entire tenure of the PWA Housing Division. Building on the Housing Division's organizational and architectural precedent, the USHA built housing in the build-up to World War II, supported war-production efforts and battled the housing shortage that occurred after the end of the war. In the 1960s, across the nation, housing authorities became key partners in urban renewal efforts, constructing new homes for those displaced by highway, hospital and other public efforts.

=== World War II Era ===
When US entry to World War II ended the era of New Deal reforms, the call for public housing from the NAACP, women's groups and labor unions was quieted. As part of the war mobilization, entire communities sprang up around factories manufacturing military goods. This influx put pressure on jobs and housing. During this period, rallies calling attention to the housing shortage were used by local and federal officials "to build support for housing legislation and to gain greater cooperation from private property owners who were reluctant to put the nation's housing needs before their own interests", since many property owners that were associated with the real estate, banking, and construction industries were rather averse to government regulation on public housing. In 1940, Congress therefore authorized the US Housing Authority to build twenty public housing developments around these private companies to sustain the war effort. There was considerable debate over whether these should be permanent dwellings, furthering reformer goals of establishing a broader public housing effort, or temporary dwellings in keeping with the timeliness of the need. The Defense Housing Division was founded in 1941 and would ultimately construct eight developments of temporary housing, though many ended up as long-term housing after the war.

One of the most unusual US public housing initiatives was the development of subsidized middle-class housing during the late New Deal (1940–1942) under the auspices of the Mutual Ownership Defense Housing Division of the Federal Works Agency under the direction of Colonel Lawrence Westbrook. These eight projects were purchased by the residents after the Second World War and as of 2009 seven of the projects continue to operate as mutual housing corporations owned by their residents. These projects are among the very few definitive success stories in the history of the US public housing effort.

During World War II, construction of homes dramatically decreased as all efforts were directed towards the War. When the veterans returned from overseas, they came ready to start a new life, often with families, and did so with the funding resources of the G.I. Bill to start a new mortgage. However, there was not enough housing stock to accommodate the demand. As a result, President Truman created the office of Housing Expediter by executive order on January 26, 1946, to be headed by Wilson Wyatt. Through this office, government intervened in the housing market largely through price controls and supply chain restrictions, despite political pressure from some factions to directly construct housing. Efforts moved to focus exclusively on veterans housing, specifically a materials subsidy for housing construction. However, in the wake of the 1946 elections, President Truman believed there was insufficient public support to continue such materials restrictions and subsidies. The Veterans' Emergency Housing Program ended in January 1947 by an executive order from President Truman.

=== Housing Act of 1949 ===
With the Office of Housing Expediter ended, housing efforts moved to look at new, comprehensive approaches to address housing issues. The result was the Housing Act of 1949, which dramatically expanded the role of the federal government in both public and private housing. Part of Truman's Fair Deal, the Act covered three primary areas: (1) It expanded the Federal Housing Administration and federal involvement in mortgage insurance, (2) under Title I, it provided authority and funds for slum clearance and urban renewal, and (3) initiated construction of a significant public housing program. Title II of the legislation stated the goal of a "decent home in a decent environment for every American", and the legislation authorized $13 billion mortgage guarantees, $1.5 billion for slum redevelopment, and set a construction goal of 810,000 units of public housing.

Upon its passage, Truman told the press:

[This legislation] opens up the prospect of decent homes in wholesome surroundings for low-income families now living in the squalor of the slums. It equips the Federal Government, for the first time, with effective means for aiding cities in the vital task of clearing slums and rebuilding blighted areas. This legislation permits us to take a long step toward increasing the well-being and happiness of millions of our fellow citizens. Let us not delay in fulfilling that high purpose.

=== Housing in the 1960s ===
==== Housing and Urban Development Act of 1965 ====
Discontent with Urban Renewal came fairly swiftly on the heels of the passage of Title I and the Housing Act of 1949. Urban renewal had become, for many cities, a way to eliminate blight, but not a solid vehicle for constructing new housing. For example, in the ten years after the bill was passed, 425,000 units of housing were razed under its auspices, but only 125,000 units were constructed. Between Title I and the Federal Aid Highway Act of 1956, entire communities in poorer, urban neighborhoods were demolished to make way for modern developments and transportation needs, often in the 'towers in the park' style of Le Corbusier. Jane Jacobs would famously describe the new products as, "Low-income projects that become worse centers of delinquency, vandalism, and general social hopelessness than the slums they were supposed to replace. Middle-income housing projects which are truly marvels of dullness and regimentation, sealed against any buoyancy or vitality of city life. Luxury housing projects that mitigate their inanity, or try to, with vapid vulgarity ... This is not the rebuilding of cities. This is the sacking of cities."

Several additional housing acts were passed after 1949, altering the program in small ways, such as shifting ratios for elderly housing, but no major legislation changed the mechanisms of public housing until the Housing and Urban Development Act of 1965. This act created the Department of Housing and Urban Development (HUD), a cabinet-level agency to lead with housing. This act also introduced rent subsidies for the first time, the beginning of a shift towards encouraging privately constructed low-income housing. With this legislation, the FHA would insure mortgages for non-profits which would then construct homes for low-income families. HUD could then provide subsidies to bridge the gap between the cost of these units and a set percentage of a household's income.

The 1961 Housing Act quietly introduced a program under Section 23 which allowed local housing authorities to house individuals on their waiting lists in privately leased units through the mechanism of a voucher which covered the gap between household ability to pay and the market rent. This mechanism was repeatedly expanded in later legislation.

==== Housing and Urban Development Act of 1968 ====
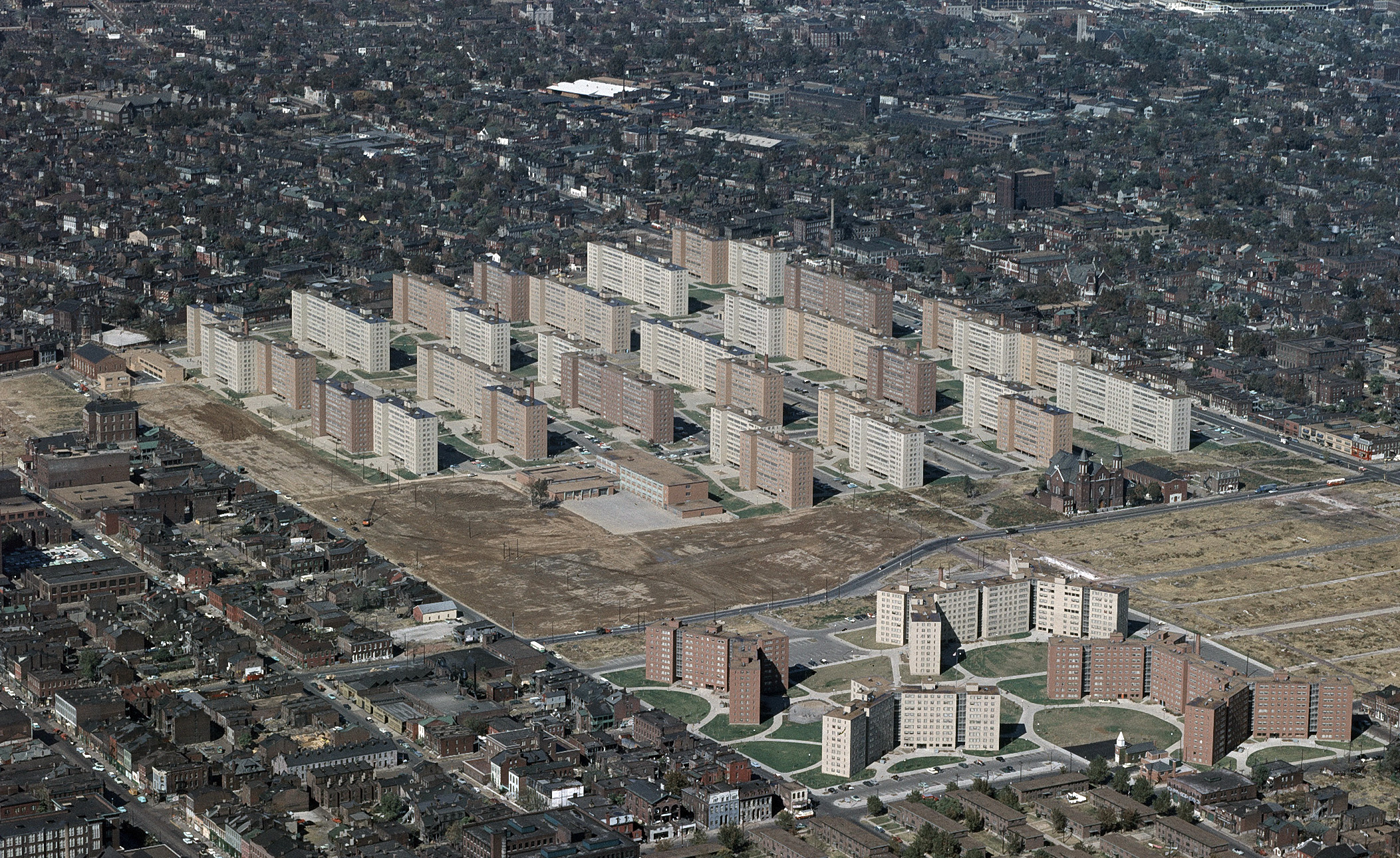
Designed by Minoru Yamasaki, Pruitt and Igoe consisted of the thirty-three buildings pictured. Dramatic images of its demolition made newspapers across the country.

In response to many of the emerging concerns regarding new public housing developments, the Housing and Urban Development Act of 1968 attempt to shift the style of housing developments, looking to the Garden Cities model of Ebenezer Howard. The act prohibited the construction of high-rise developments for families with children. The role of high-rises had always been contentious, but with rising rates of vandalism and vacancy and considerable concerns about the concentration of poverty, some contended these developments were declared unsuitable for families. One of the most notorious of these developments was the Pruitt-Igoe development in St. Louis, Missouri, constructed in 1955 and 1956. This development posted 2,870 units in thirty-three high rises buildings. By the late 1960s, vacancy rates reached as high as 65%, and the project was demolished between 1972 and 1975. More recent scholarship about the story of Pruitt-Igoe, which has often been used as a parable for the failures of large-scale public housing in the United States, has elucidated that the unraveling of the complex had more to do with structural racism, disinvestment in the urban core, white flight, and the diminishing post-industrial incomes of the buildings' residents than with high rise architecture or the nature of publicly owned and -operated housing.

The Act also impacted the home ownership market through the expansion of the FHA. Ginnie Mae was initially established to purchase risky public housing projects and resell them at market rates. In addition, Section 235 originated mortgage subsidies by reducing the interest rate on mortgages for low-income families to a rate more comparable to that of the FHA mortgages. The program suffered from high foreclosure rates and administrative scandal, and was dramatically scaled down in 1974. The Section 236 program subsidized the debt service on private developments which would then be offered at a reduced rates to households below a certain income ceiling.

=== Housing in the 1970s ===
==== Experimental Housing Allowance Program ====
The Housing Act of 1970 established the Experimental Housing Allowance Program (EHAP), a lengthy investigation in the potential market effects of housing vouchers. Vouchers, initially introduced in 1965, were an attempt to subsidize the demand side of the housing market rather than the supply side by supplementing a household's rent allowance until they were able to afford market rates. EHAP was designed to test three aspects of the impact of vouchers:

- Demand: Investigated user dynamics, including mobility, participation rates, rent rates, and housing standards.
- Supply: Monitored the market response to the subsidy, namely whether it changed the construction or rent rates for the community, writ large.
- Administration: Examined several different approaches to structuring and managing the programs.

Ultimately, new legislation on housing vouchers did not wait for the conclusion of the experiment. When the program concluded over a decade later, it was discovered that the program had minimal impact on surrounding rents, but did have the potential to tighten the market for low-income housing, and communities were in need of an infusion of additional units. Some therefore argued that public housing was the appropriate model for cost and supply-chain reasons, though vouchers did not appear to overly distort local housing markets.

==== Housing moratorium ====
In 1973, President Richard Nixon halted funding for numerous housing projects in the wake of concerns regarding the housing projects constructed in the prior two decades. HUD Secretary George Romney declared that the moratorium would encompass all money for Urban Renewal and Model Cities programs, all subsidized housing, and Section 235 and 236 funding. An intensive report was commissioned from the National Housing Policy Review to analyze and assess the federal government's role in housing. This report, entitled Housing in the Seventies was instrumental in crafting new housing legislation the following year. In keeping with Nixon's market-based approach, as demonstrated by EHAP, Nixon also lifted the moratorium on the Section 23 voucher program late in September, allowing for 200,000 new households to be funded. The full moratorium was lifted in the summer of 1974, as Nixon faced impeachment in the wake of Watergate.

==== Housing and Community Development Act of 1974 ====
The Housing and Community Development Act of 1974 created the Section 8 Housing Program to encourage the private sector to construct affordable homes. This kind of housing assistance assists poor tenants by giving a monthly subsidy to their landlords. This assistance can be 'project based,' which applies to specific properties, or 'tenant based,' which provides tenants with a voucher they can use anywhere vouchers are accepted. Tenant based housing vouchers covered the gap between 25% of a household's income and established fair market rent. Virtually no new project based Section 8 housing has been produced since 1983, but tenant based vouchers are now the primary mechanism of assisted housing.

The other main feature of the Act was the creation of the Community Development Block Grant (CDBG). While not directly tied to public housing, CDBGs were lump sums of money, the amount of which was determined by a formula focusing on population, given to state and local governments for housing and community development work. The sum could be used as determined by the community, though the legislation also required the development of Housing Assistance Plans (HAP) which required local communities to survey and catalog their available housing stock as well as determine the populations most in need of assistance. These were submitted as part of the CDBG application.

Again in response to the growing discontent with public housing, urban developers began looking for alternate forms of affordable, low-income housing. From this concern sprang the creation of scattered-site housing programs designed to place smaller-scale, better-integrated public housing units in diverse neighborhoods. Scattered-site housing programs became popularized in the late 1970s and 1980s. Since that time, cities across the country have implemented such programs with varying levels of success.

=== Housing in the 1980s–1990s ===
Changes to public housing programs were minor during the 1980s. Under the Reagan administration, household contribution towards Section 8 rents was increased to 30% of household income and fair market rents were lowered. In the 1980s, Section 8 was one of the few protective measures that remained against homelessness after institutional supports were rescinded for these people in need. Public assistance for housing efforts was reduced as part of a package of across the board cuts. Additionally, emergency shelters for the homeless were expanded, and home ownership by low-income families was promoted to a greater degree.

In 1990, President George H. W. Bush signed the Cranston-Gonzalez National Affordable Housing Act (NAHA), which furthered the use of HOME funds for rental assistance. In his address upon its passage, Bush said, "Although the Federal Government currently serves about 4.3 million low-income families, there are about 4 million additional families, most of them very low income, whose housing needs have not been met. We should not divert assistance from those who need it most."

The next new era in public housing began in 1992 with the launch of the HOPE VI program by the United States Department of Housing and Urban Development. HOPE VI funds were devoted to demolishing poor-quality public housing projects and replacing them with lower-density developments, often of mixed-income. Funds included construction and demolition costs, tenant relocation costs, and subsidies for newly constructed units. HOPE VI has become the primary vehicle for the construction of new federally subsidized units, but it suffered considerable funding cuts in 2004 under President George W. Bush who called for the abolition of the program.

In 1998, the Quality Housing and Work Responsibility Act (QHWRA) was passed and signed by President Bill Clinton. Following the frame of welfare reform, QHWRA developed new programs to transition families out of public housing, developed a home ownership model for Section 8, and expanded the HOPE VI program to replace traditional public housing units. The act also effectively capped the number of public housing units by creating the Faircloth Limit as an amendment to the Housing Act of 1937, which limited funding for the construction or operation of all units to the total number of units as of October 1, 1999 and repealed a rule that required one for one replacement of demolished housing units.

A substantial innovation observed after the 1980s was private financing––where venture capitalists contribute investment capital, in return for which they receive an equivalent reduction in the federal taxes. These consist of credits applied to tax returns throughout a period of ten years. However, these Low Income Housing Tax Credits (LHITCs) have not been as beneficial in the long term since they only cover the cost of development and rent subsidies.

== Social issues ==
=== Concentrated poverty ===
According to HUD's Residential Characteristic Report, the average annual income in 2013 for a resident of a public housing unit is $13,730. The same report classifies 68% of residents as Extremely Low Income, with the largest annual income bracket being $5,000 to $10,000, containing 32% of public housing residents.

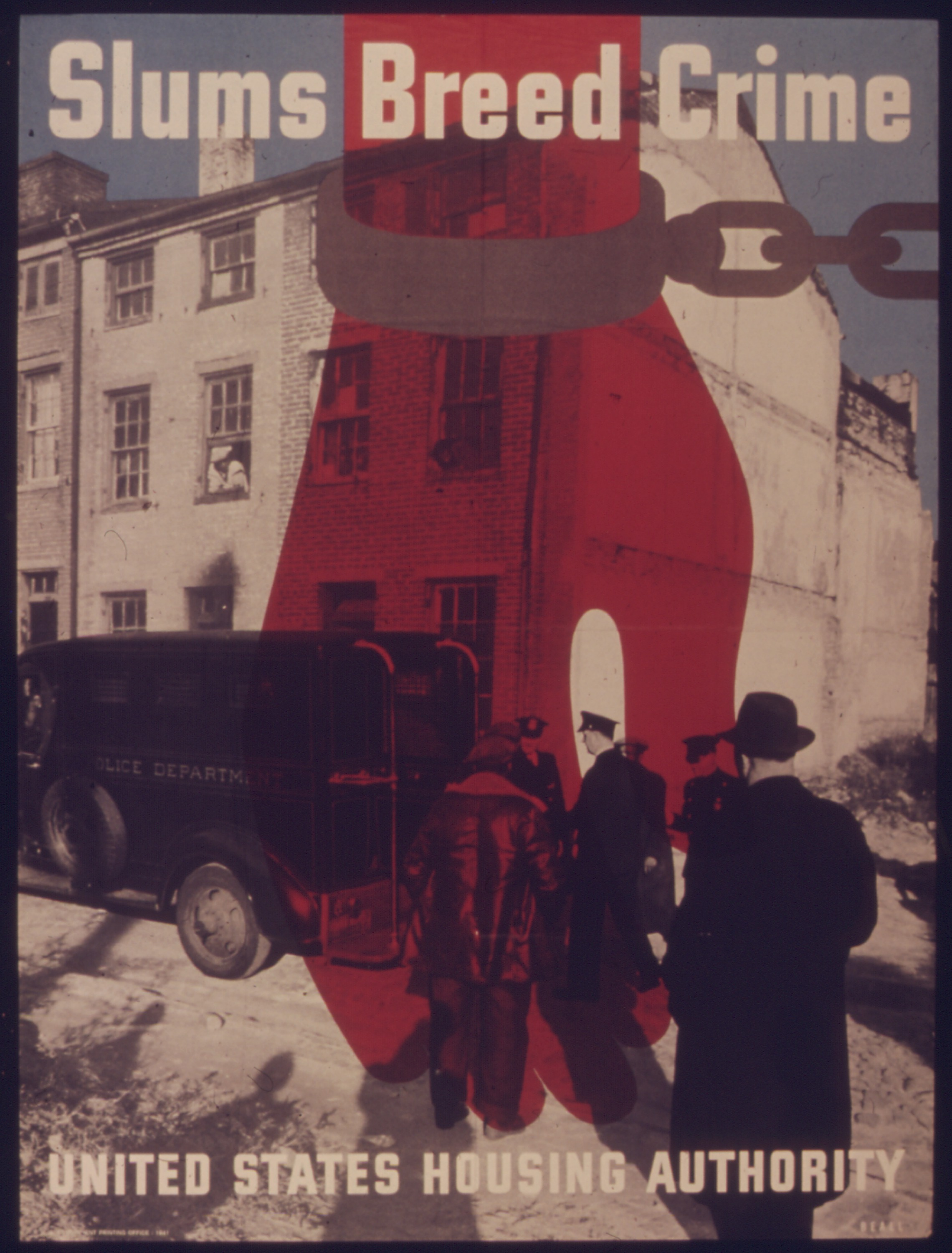
An advertisement from the United States Housing Authority advocating for slum clearance as a solution for crime

Trends showing an increase in geographic concentration of poverty became evident by the 1970s as upper and middle-class residents vacated property in U.S. cities. Urban renewal programs led to widespread slum clearance, creating a need to house those displaced by the clearance (Massey and Kanaiaupuni 1993). However, those in city governments, political organizations, and suburban communities resisted the creation of public housing units in middle and working-class neighborhoods, leading to the construction of such units around ghetto neighborhoods which already exhibited signs of poverty. Massey and Kanaiaupuni (1993) describe three sources of concentrated poverty in relation to public housing: income-requirements structurally creating areas of poverty, the reinforcement of patterns of poverty via the location of the public housing units, and the migration of impoverished individuals towards the public housing, although this effect is relatively small in comparison to the other sources.

A study of public housing in Columbus, Ohio, found that public housing has differing effects on the concentration of black poverty versus white poverty. Public housing's effect on concentrated poverty is doubled for blacks compared to whites. The study further found that public housing tends to concentrate those who struggle the most economically into a specific area, further raising poverty levels.

A different study, conducted by Freeman (2003) on a national level, cast doubt onto the theory that public housing units have an independent effect on the concentration of poverty. The study found that while out-migration of the non-poor and in-migration of the poor were associated with the creation of public housing, such associations disappeared with the introduction of statistical controls, suggesting that migration levels were caused by characteristics of the neighborhood itself rather than the public housing unit.

Concentrated poverty from public housing units has effects on the economy of the surrounding area, competing for space with middle class housing. Because of social pathologies incubated by public housing, Husock (2003) states that unit prices in surrounding buildings fall, reducing city revenue from property taxes and giving a disincentive to high-paying businesses to locate themselves in the area. He further argues that the pathologies caused by a concentration of poverty are likely to spread to surrounding neighborhoods, forcing local residents and businesses to relocate.

Freeman and Botein (2002) are more skeptical of a reduction of property values following the building of public housing units. In a meta-analysis of empirical studies, they expected to find that when public housing lacks obtrusive architecture and its residents are similar to those already in the neighborhood, property values are not likely to fluctuate. However, a review of the literature yielded no definitive conclusions on the impact of public housing on property values, with only two studies lacking methodological flaws that had either mixed results or showed no impact.

Others are skeptical of concentrated poverty from public housing being the cause of social pathologies, arguing that such a characterization is a simplification of a much more complex set of social phenomena. According to Crump (2002), the term "concentrated poverty" was originally a spatial concept that was part of a much broader and complex sociological description of poverty, but the spatial component then became the overarching metaphor for concentrated poverty and the cause of social pathologies surrounding it. Instead of spatial concentration simply being a part of the broad description of social pathologies, Crump (2002) argues that the concept replaced the broad description, mistakenly narrowing the focus to the physical concentration of poverty.

=== Racial segregation ===
The HUD's 2013 The Location and Racial Composition of Public Housing in the United States report found that the racial distribution of residents within individual public housing units tends to be rather homogeneous, with African Americans and white residents stratified to separate neighborhoods. One trend that is observed is that black neighborhoods tend to reflect a lower socioeconomic status and that white neighborhoods represent a more affluent demographic. More than 40% of public housing occupants live in predominantly black neighborhoods, according to the HUD report. Even though changes have been made to address unconstitutional housing segregation, stigma and prejudice around public housing projects are still prevalent.

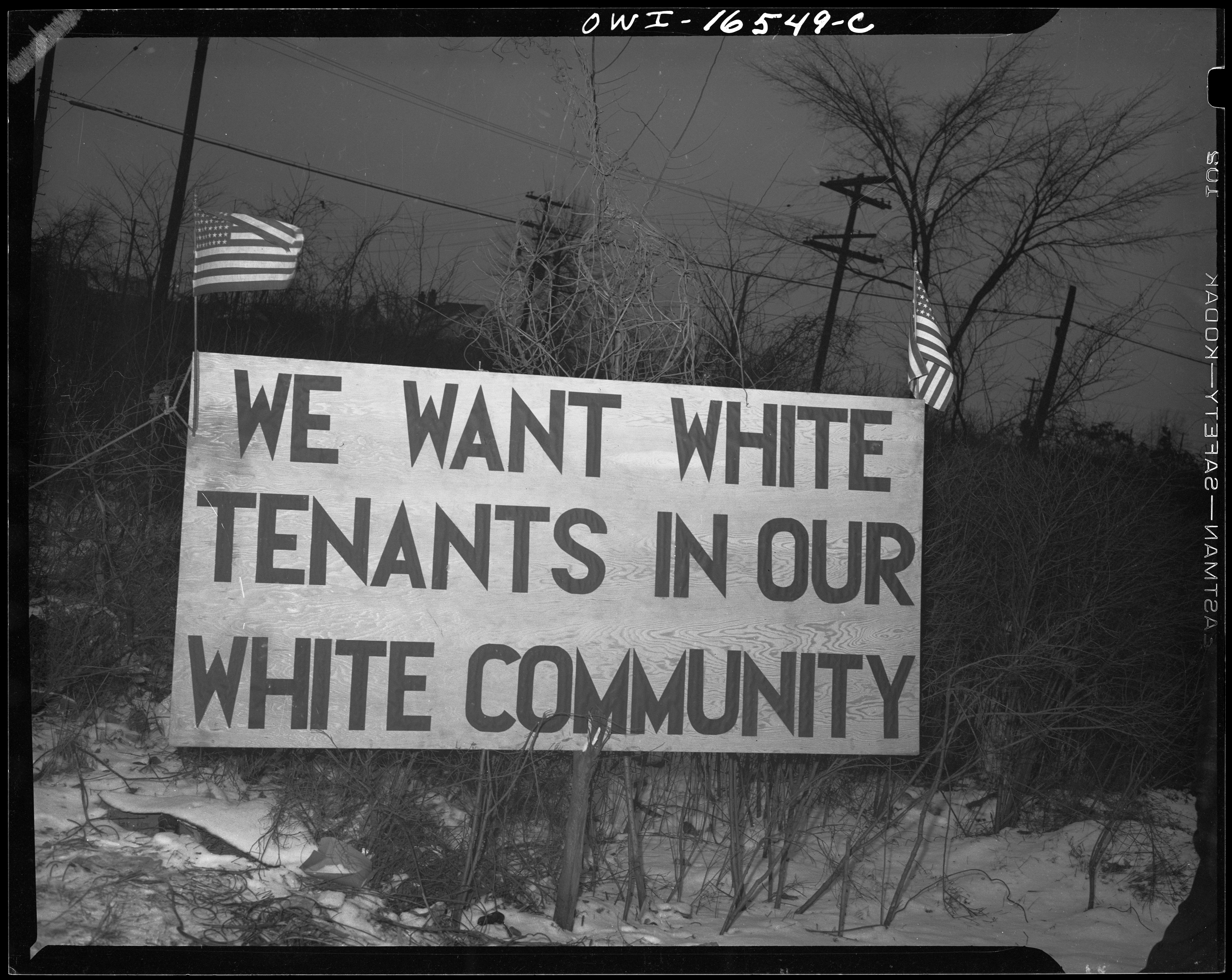
Many white residents in Detroit in the 1940s strongly protested the creation of new public housing units. When their protests did not help, they left for the suburbs, also known as white flight. Photograph by Arthur Siegel.

Segregation in public housing has roots in the early developments and activities of the Federal Housing Administration (FHA), created by the Housing Act of 1934. The FHA institutionalized a practice by which it would seek to maintain racially homogenous neighborhoods through racially restrictive covenants – an explicitly discriminatory policy written into the deed of a house. This practice was struck down by the Supreme Court in 1948 in Shelley v. Kraemer because it violates the Equal Protection Clause of the 14th Amendment. However, according to Gotham (2000), Section 235 of the Housing Act of 1968 encouraged white flight from the inner city, selling suburban properties to whites and inner-city properties to blacks, creating neighborhoods that were racially isolated from others.

White flight – white people moving out of neighborhoods that have become more racially or ethnoculturally heterogeneous – is an example of how stigma and judgement around public housing and affordable housing resulted in a significant change in the racial demographics of urban housing. White flight is a sociological response to perceptions that racially diverse neighborhoods will decrease their home value and increase crime rates.

McNulty and Holloway (2000) studied the intersection of public housing geography, race, and crime in order to determine if racial differences existed in crime rates when controlled for the proximity of public housing units. The study found that "the race-crime relationship is geographically contingent, varying as a function of the distribution of public housing". This suggests that a focus on institutional causes of crime in relation to race is more appropriate than a focus on cultural differences between races being the cause of differing crime rates. Public housing units were often built in predominantly poor and black areas, reinforcing racial and economic differences between neighborhoods.

These social patterns are influenced by policies that constructed the narrative of racially segregated housing in the 20th Century. The riot in Detroit in 1967 was a symptom of racial tension that was in part due to unfair housing policies. In July 1967, President Lyndon B. Johnson issued a commission, led by Illinois Governor Otto Kerner to determine the causes of the riots. The Kerner Commission clearly articulated that housing inequality was solely determined by explicitly discriminatory policies. It stated that "White institutions created it, white institutions maintain it, and white society condones it". The Kerner Commission blatantly condemned white institutions for creating unequal housing opportunities, specifically highlighting restrictive covenants as a cause of the American apartheid residential pattern in the city.

Martin Luther King Jr. made housing integration a key part of his civil rights campaign and one month after the publication of the Kerner Commission was published, King was assassinated. His murder instigated another wave of riots and in response, and no later than a week after the assassination of Martin Luther King Jr., Congress passed the Fair Housing Act which prohibited discrimination in housing.

However, since the Fair Housing Act was passed, housing policies restricting minority housing to segregated neighborhoods are still heavily debated because of the vague language used in the Fair Housing Act. In the 2015 Supreme Court case Texas Department of Housing and Community Affairs v. The Inclusive Communities Project, Justice Kennedy clarified that the Fair Housing Act was intended to promote equity, not just eliminate explicit acts of discrimination. Changes in both public policy and social narrative are equally necessary for establishing equitable housing opportunities for all Americans.

=== Health and safety ===
Public housing units themselves offer very few amenities to occupants, providing the minimum necessary accommodations for living. The original wording of the 1937 Housing Act meant that units were built with minimal effort in order to give amenities only slightly better than slums. The units had poor insulation, roofing, electricity, and plumbing, were generally very small, and built to use as few resources as possible. More physical deterioration was documented by Turner et al., along with backlogged repairs, vandalism, cockroaches, mold, and other problems creating a generally unsafe environment for occupants (2005). A study conducted in Boston revealed that dampness and heating issues in public housing create concentrations of dust mites, mold, and fungi, which causes asthma at a rate much higher than the national average. Yet another study indicated that an increased risk of obesity was correlated with living in public housing. In this study, it is noted that subsidies may cause renters to be more concentrated in neighborhoods with lower incomes and opportunities, thereby leading to associations with worse health outcomes.

However, other studies have been less negative in their assessments of living conditions in public housing units, showing only marginal differences caused by public housing units. The study by Fertig and Reingold (2007) concluded that of a large list of possible health effects, public housing units only seemed to affect domestic violence levels––with only a mixed effect, a mother's overall health status, and the probability of mothers becoming overweight. Moreover, an observational study on public housing versus vouchers and multifamily housing yielded the result that public housing corresponded to lower levels of psychological distress.

During the COVID-19 pandemic, the Center for Disease Control and Prevention placed a moratorium on evictions. These circumstances brought awareness to the clear association of housing security––provided by subsidized housing––with improved health outcomes.

Crime is also a major issue in public housing, with surveys showing high amounts of drug-related crime and shootings. Potential causes include inefficient management, which leads to problematic residents being able to stay in the unit, and inadequate policing and security. Public housing units are far more susceptible to homicides than comparable neighborhoods, which Griffiths and Tita (2009) argue is an effect of social isolation within the units. These homicides tend to be localized within the public housing unit rather than around it.

Satisfaction with one's living environment is another variable affected by public housing. Residents of public housing units and voucher holders are more likely to express higher satisfaction with their current residency than low-income renters who are not receiving government assistance. However, the study also concluded that residents of public housings units and voucher holders are more likely to express lower satisfaction with the neighborhood in which they live compared to low-income renters. This suggests that while the accommodations of public housing are better than comparable options, the surrounding neighborhoods are less desirable and have not been improved by government assistance.

=== Education ===
Another concern about public housing is the availability of quality education for children living in public housing units in areas of concentrated poverty. In a study of student achievement in New York City, Schwartz et al. (2010) found that those children living in public housing units did worse on standardized tests than others who go to the same or comparable schools. Furthermore, the study found that the resources of the schools serving different populations of the city were roughly the same.

Other studies refute this result, stating that public housing does not have a unique effect on student achievement. In a study for the National Bureau of Economic Research, Jacob (2003) found that children who had moved out of public housing due to demolition in Chicago fared no better and no worse in school and often continued to attend the same school as before demolition. However, among High Schoolers (14 years or older), dropout rates increased by 4.4% after demolition, though this effect was not seen in younger children.

A separate study conducted by Newman and Harkness (2000) produced findings similar to Jacob (2003). It concluded that public housing did not have an independent effect on educational attainment levels. Instead, variation in educational attainment was associated with poor economic standing and characteristics of the family. Additionally, the study found very little difference between educational attainment in public versus subsidized private housing developments.

More positive educational outcomes have been recorded in other analyses. A study by Currie and Yelowitz (1999) found that families living in public housing were less likely to experience overcrowding in their units. Children living in public housing were 11% less likely to be held back a grade, suggesting that public housing may help low-income students. A 2011 report from the Center for Housing Policy argued for the benefits of stable and affordable housing in regard to education. Reasons for such educational benefits included less sporadic moving, community support, reduction in stress from overcrowding, less health hazards, provision of after-school programs, and reduction of homelessness.

=== Public perception ===
Opinions on subsidized housing in the United States are varied. A survey conducted by the Pew Research Center in October 2021 showed 49% of American adults viewed the availability, or lack thereof, of affordable housing as a significant problem within their local communities. Additionally, based on separate findings from the Cato Institute 2019 Welfare, Work, and Wealth National Survey, Ekins (2019) reported that 59% of Americans favor construction of more housing in their neighborhoods. While nearly half of U.S. adults consider this to be a major issue, public perception also varies based on the types of communities that people live in. Americans living in urban areas have greater concerns regarding public housing compared to their suburban and rural counterparts. Schaeffer (2022) found that 63% of urban residents viewed affordable housing as a significant problem, where as only 46% of suburban residents and 40% of rural residents held the same opinion.

Several negative stereotypes associated with public housing create difficulties in developing new units. Tighe (2010) reviewed a breadth of literature on perceptions of public housing and found five major public concerns: a lack of maintenance, expectation of crime, disapproval of housing as a handout, reduction of property values, and physical unattractiveness. While the reality of certain aspects may differ from the perceptions, such perceptions are strong enough to mount formidable opposition to public housing programs.

In a separate study, Freeman and Botein (2002) found four major areas of public concern related to public housing: reduction in property values, racial transition, concentrated poverty, and increased crime. The study concludes that such concerns are only warranted in certain circumstances, and in varying degrees. While negative consequences have potential to occur with the building of public housing, there is an almost equal chance of the public housing having the opposite effect of creating positive impacts within the neighborhood.

== Alternative models ==
=== Scattered-site housing ===
"Scattered-site" or "scatter site" refers to a form of housing in which publicly funded, affordable, low-density units are scattered throughout diverse, middle-class neighborhoods. It can take the form of single units spread throughout the city or clusters of family units.

Scattered-site housing can also be managed by private not-for-profit organizations using a permanent, supportive housing model, where specific barriers to the housing of the low-income individual or family are addressed in regular visits with a case manager. In New York City, The Scatter Site Apartment Program provides city contracts to not-for-profits from the HIV/AIDS Services Administration under the New York City Human Resources Administration. Also, Scattered Site is one of two models, the other being Congregate, which are utilized in the New York/New York housing agreements between New York City and New York State.

==== Background ====
Scattered-site housing units were originally constructed as an alternative form of public housing designed to prevent the concentration of poverty associated with more traditional high-density units. The benchmark class-action case that led to the popularization of scattered-site models was Gautreaux v. Chicago Housing Authority in 1969. Much of motivation for this trial and lawsuit stemmed from concerns about residential segregation. It was believed that the placement of public housing facilities in primarily black neighborhoods perpetuated residential segregation. The lawsuit was finally resolved with a verdict mandating that the Chicago Housing Authority redistribute public housing into non-black neighborhoods. U.S. District Court Judge Richard B. Austin mandated that three public housing units be built in white areas (less than 30% black) for every one unit built in black areas (more than 30% black).

These percentages have decreased since then and a wide array of programs have developed across the United States. While some programs have seen great successes, others have had difficulties in acquiring the land needed for construction and in maintaining new units. Eligibility requirements, generally based on household income and size, are common in these programs. In Dakota County, Minnesota, for example, eligibility ranges from a maximum of $51,550 for two people to $85,050 for 8–10 people.

Eligibility requirements are designed to ensure that those most in need receive relief first and that concerns regarding housing discrimination do not extend into the public housing sector.

==== Public policy and implications ====
Scattered-site housing programs are generally run by the city housing authorities or local governments. They are intended to increase the availability of affordable housing and improve the quality of low-income housing, while avoiding problems associated with concentrated subsidized housing. Many scattered-site units are built to be similar in appearance to other homes in the neighborhood to somewhat mask the financial stature of tenants and reduce the stigma associated with public housing.

An issue of great concern with regards to the implementation of scattered-site programs is where to construct these housing units and how to gain the support of the community. Frequent concerns of community members include potential decreases in the retail price of their home, a decline in neighborhood safety due to elevated levels of crime. Thus, one of the major concerns with the relocation of scattered-site tenants into white, middle-class neighborhoods is that residents will move elsewhere – a phenomenon known as white flight. To counter this phenomenon, some programs place tenants in private apartments that do not appear outwardly different. Despite these efforts, many members of middle-class, predominantly white neighborhoods have fought hard to keep public housing out of their communities.

American sociologist William Julius Wilson has proposed that concentrating low-income housing in impoverished areas can limit tenants' access to social opportunity. Thus, some scattered-site programs now relocate tenants in middle-class suburban neighborhoods, hoping that immersion within social networks of greater financial stability will increase their social opportunities. However, this strategy has not necessarily proved effective, especially with regards to boosting employment. When placed in neighborhoods of similar economic means, studies indicate that low-income residents use neighbors as social resources less often when living scattered throughout a neighborhood than when living in small clusters within a neighborhood.

There are also concerns associated with the financial burden that these programs have on the state. Scattered-site housing provides no better living conditions for its tenants than traditional concentrated housing if the units are not properly maintained. There are questions as to whether or not scattered-site public facilities are more expensive to manage because dispersal throughout the city makes maintenance more difficult.

Inclusionary zoning ordinances require housing developers to reserve a percentage between 10 and 30% of housing units from new or rehabilitated projects to be rented or sold at a below market rate for low and moderate-income households. According to United States Department of Housing and Urban Development (HUD), market-rate projects help to develop diverse communities, and ensure access to similar community services and amenities regardless of socioeconomic status. Most inclusionary zoning is enacted at the municipal or county level. For example, San Francisco's Planning Code Section 415 (set forth the requirements and procedures for the Inclusionary Affordable Housing Program) "requires residential projects of 10 or more units to pay an Affordable Housing Fee, or to provide a percentage of units as affordable "on-site" within the project or "off-site" at another location in the city (Planning Code § 415, 419)." Additionally, market-rate housing construction has been shown to lower prices of individual houses, leading to a trend of lower income inhabitants moving into vacant homes after higher income inhabitants.

=== Vouchers ===
Housing vouchers, now one of the primary methods of subsidized housing delivery in the United States, became a robust program in the United States with passage of the 1974 Housing and Community Development Act. The program, colloquially known as Section 8, currently assists more than 1.4 million households. Through the voucher system, direct-to-landlord payments assist eligible households in covering the gap between market rents and 30% of the household's income.

=== Hope VI ===
The Hope VI program, created in 1992, was initiated in response to the physical deterioration of public housing units. The program rebuilds housing projects with an emphasis on mixed-income developments rather than projects which concentrate poorer households in one area.

== City programs ==
=== Chicago ===
The class-action lawsuit of Gautreaux v. CHA (1966) made Chicago the first city to mandate scattered-site housing as a way to desegregate neighborhoods. Dorothy Gautreaux argued that the Chicago Housing Authority discriminated based on race in its public housing policy. The case went to Supreme Court as Hills v. Gautreaux and the 1976 verdict mandated scattered-site housing for residents currently living in public housing in impoverished neighborhoods.

Since that time, scattered-site housing has become a major part of public housing in Chicago. In 2000, the Chicago Housing Authority created the Plan for Transformation designed to not only improve the structural aspects of public housing but to also "build and strengthen communities by integrating public housing and its leaseholders into the larger social, economic, and physical fabric of Chicago". The goal is to have 25,000 new or remodeled units, and to have these units indistinguishable from surrounding housing. While properly run scattered-site public housing units greatly improve the quality of life of the tenants, abandoned and decrepit units foster crime and perpetuate poverty. The Chicago Housing Authority began demolishing units deemed unsafe, but the Plan for Transformation set aside $77 million to clean up sites not demolished in this process.

=== Houston ===
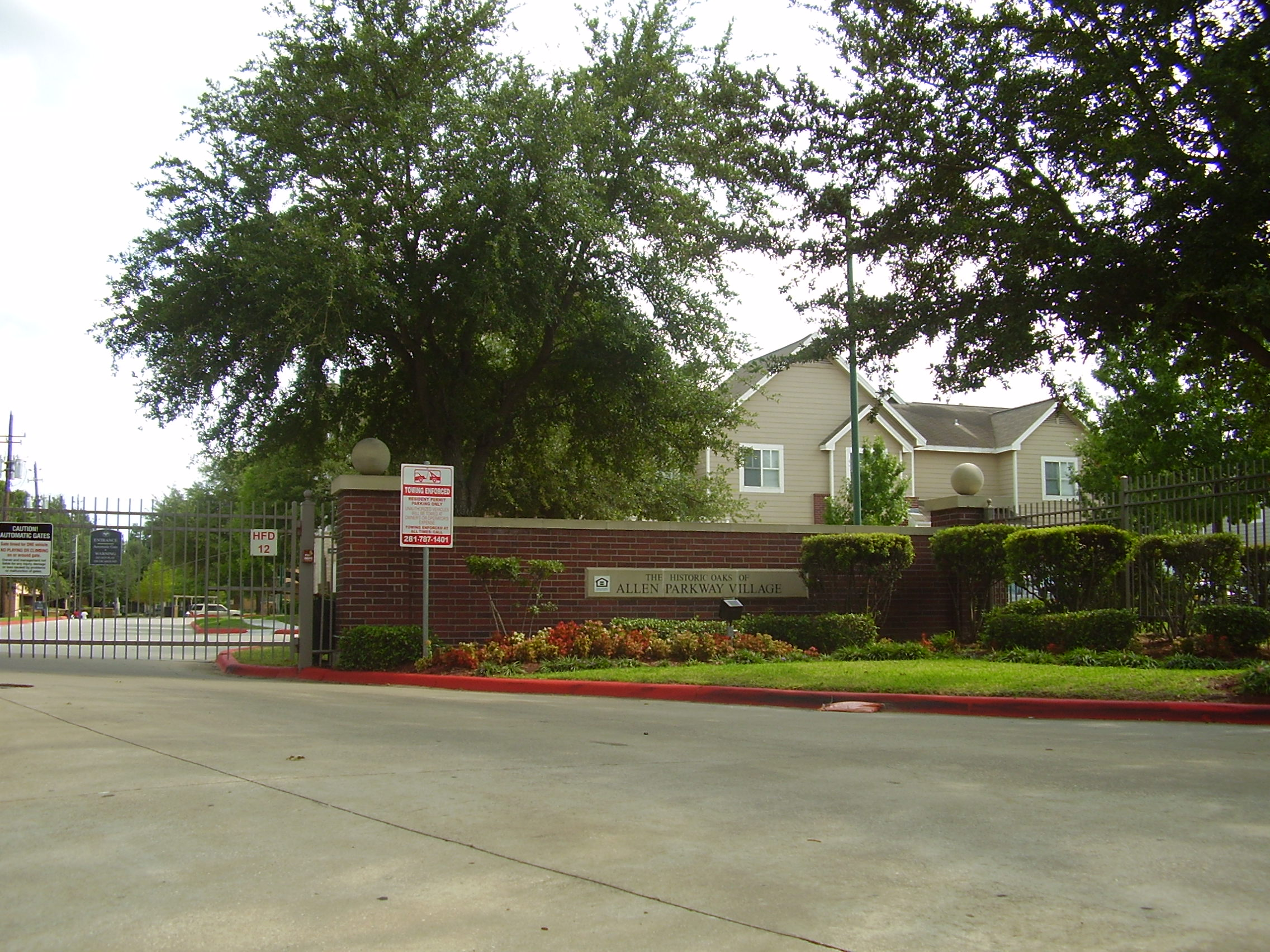
The Historic Oaks of Allen Parkway Village in Fourth Ward, Houston

The Houston Housing Authority has created the Scattered Sites Homeownership Program to promote home ownership amongst those who would otherwise not be able to afford it. The program delineates strict requirements based on 80% of the Houston area's median income. In 1987, the HHA received 336 properties throughout the city and it has worked to clean up these properties or sell them as low cost housing. As of 2009, the HHA had helped 172 families achieve home ownership through the scattered-site program and with the properties received in 1988.

=== Seattle ===
The Seattle Housing Authority created its Scattered Site program in 1978. The program to date has a total of 800 units that range from duplex to multi-family. The program is currently in the process of "portfolio realignment", which entails successive upgrading of over 200 units and a continued effort to distribute public housing in various neighborhoods throughout the city. In choosing site locations, proximity to public facilities such as schools, parks, and transportation, is considered.

=== San Francisco ===
In 1938, the San Francisco Board of Supervisors established the San Francisco Housing Authority (SFHA), making it today one of the oldest housing authorities in California. The Housing Choice Voucher Program (formerly Section 8) was adopted in 1974 by the SFHA, and today it serves over 20,000 residents of San Francisco. Primary funding for the SFHA program comes from the U.S Department of Housing and Urban Development (HUD) and the rents paid by the housing choice voucher participants. Participants pay approximately 30 percent of their earned income for rent.

=== Public housing in Puerto Rico ===
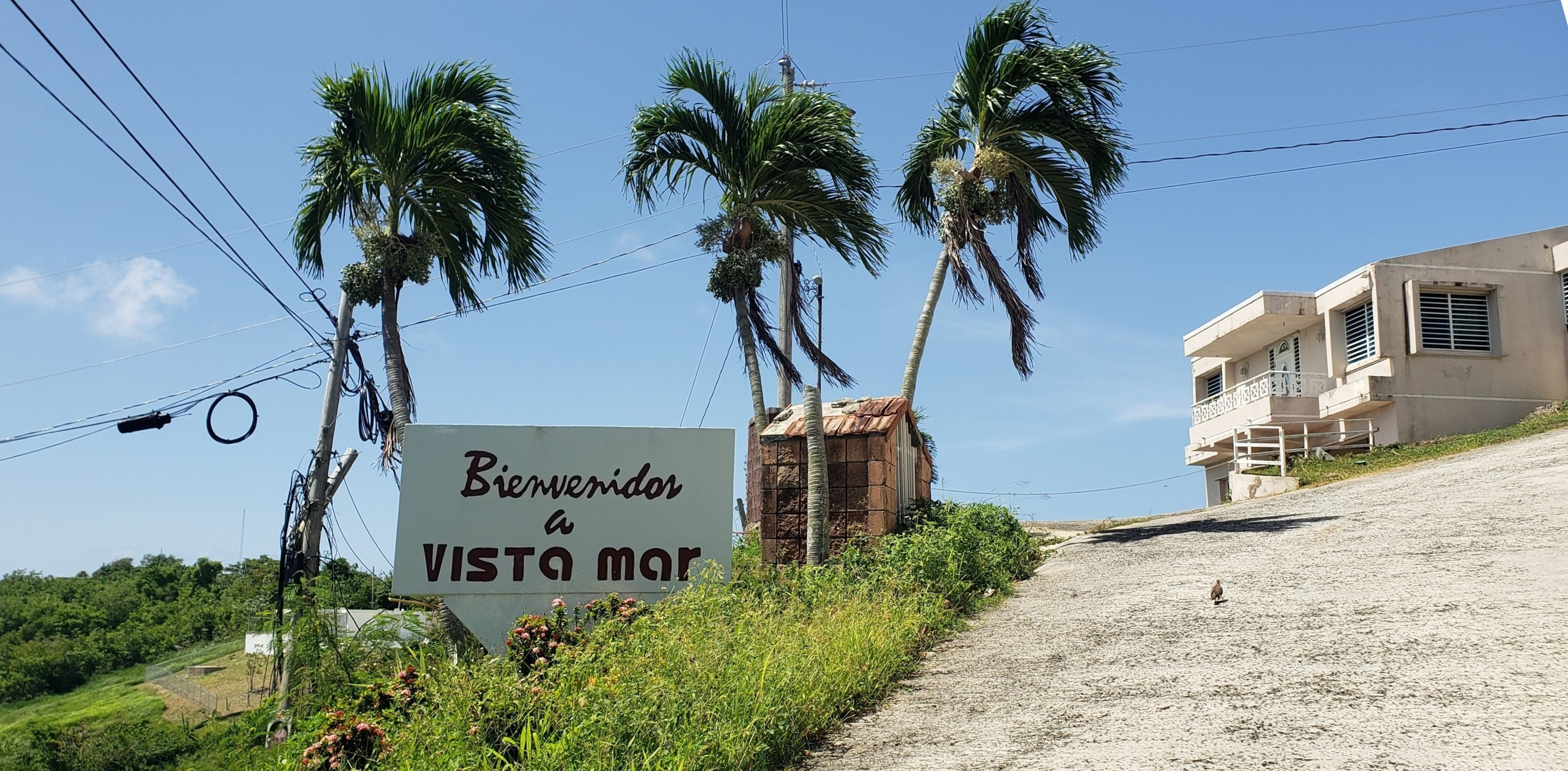
Urbanización Vista Mar in Playa barrio in Yabucoa

Neighborhoods in the american U.S territory of Puerto Rico are often divided into three types: sector, urbanización, and residencial público (public housing).

An urbanización is a type of housing where land is developed into lots, often by a private developer, and where single-family homes are built. Non single-family units, such as condominiums and townhouses fall into this category.

Public housing, on the other hand, are housing units built with government funding. These have traditionally consisted of multi-family dwellings in housing complexes: in a barriada (neighborhood) or in a caserío público also called a residencial (public housing). This is housing where all exterior grounds are shared areas. Increasingly, public housing developments that look like garden apartments are being built.

Finally, a home that is located in neither an urbanización nor of a public housing development is said to be located in a barrio.

In Puerto Rico, a barrio also has a second and official meaning- the geographical area into which a municipality of Puerto Rico is divided for administrative purposes. In this sense, urbanizaciones, public housing developments, as well as one or several "barrios" in the popular sense of the word (as in sector, from a populated place standpoint), may be located in one of the 902 official geographic areas which are seen on the Puerto Rico US Census records.

As of 2020, there were 325 public housing developments in Puerto Rico.

==== Turn to subsidized housing ====
In the 60s and 70s, the popularization of neoliberalism caused a turn away from public sector solutions towards private or public-private solutions. This, in conjunction with the narrative of public housing being obsolete, led to both the turn away from public housing and towards subsidized housing solutions.

Houses, apartments or other residential units are usually subsidized on a rent-geared-to-income (RGI) basis. Some communities have now embraced a mixed income, with both assisted and market rents, when allocating homes as they become available.

A significant change in the program took place in 1969, with the passage of the Brooke Amendment. Rents now became set at 25% of a tenant's income with the result that the program began serving the "poorest tenants".

Other attempts to solve these problems include the 1974 Section 8 Housing Program, which encourages the private sector to construct affordable homes, and subsidized public housing. This assistance can be "project-based", subsidizing properties, or "tenant-based", which provides tenants with a voucher, accepted by some landlords. This policy option represented a turn away from the public-sector policy of public housing, instead turning towards the private market to address housing needs. The program, in conjunction with HOPE VI, was intended to create income-integrated communities, by giving residents the choice of where to move. However, the housing voucher program has historically had long wait times and limited choice on where one can actually move. Additionally, it was found that many people of color did not want to move away from their families, communities, and systems of support, as well as experiencing stigma and difficulties with landlords, safety, or expenses. This leads to the program doing little to actually create a more racially-integrated city demographics, mostly reproducing inequality while simultaneously not having enough valid housing units for the long list of applicants.

== See also ==
- Subsidized housing
- Affordable housing in the United States
- Public housing
- Section 8
- Housing estate
- List of public housing developments in the United States

People:

- Harold Harby (1894–1978), Los Angeles, California, City Council member whose vote switch killed public housing in that city

General:

- Eviction in the United States
- Housing crisis
- Right to housing
- Social programs in the United States
