= Housing and Community Development Act of 1992 =

U.S. law

The Housing and Community Development Act of 1992 was first introduced to the 102nd United States Congress on June 5, 1992, and was signed and made law by President George H. W. Bush on October 28, 1992. Also known as "The 1992 Act", the bill amended a number of housing, banking, and drug abuse laws. It amended the Housing Act of 1937. It increased aggregate budget authority for low-income housing for fiscal year 1993 and 1994. It also extends ceiling rents, excludes certain child care expenses, and excessive travel expenses from the calculation of adjusted income and apply to Indian public housing certain definitions of the Cranston-Gonzales National Affordable Housing Act; It allows the Secretary of Housing and Urban Development to issue public and Section 8 housing tenant preference rules. The Act also extends certain exemptions from waiting list requirements and eligibility restrictions with respect to income eligibility for assisted housing and while revising the family self-sufficiency program, with respect to escrow saving accounts, incentives for participation, and action plans.

== History ==
On June 5, 1992, the Housing and Community Development Act of 1992 was introduced to the House of Representatives. After being amended by the House Committee on Banking, Finance and Urban Affairs, it was voted on and passed in the House on August 5; it passed the Senate on July 10. President George H. W. Bush signed it into law on October 28, 1992. The law amends a number of existing laws: United States Housing Act of 1937, Anti-Drug Abuse Act of 1988, The Department of Housing and Urban Development Reform Act of 1989, The Housing and Community Development Amendments of 1981, The Cranston-Gonzales National Housing Act of 1990, The Federal Deposit Insurance Act, and the Federal Credit Union Act, The Home Owners' Loan Act, The International Banking Act of 1978, The Right to Financial Privacy Act.

== Overview ==
The Housing and Community Development Act of 1992 amended and extended a number of laws related to housing assistance, home ownership, low-income housing, and housing for the elderly and disabled. It amends the United States Housing Act of 1937, calling for reconstruction of obsolete public housing, reduction of tenant preference housing for families in substandard housing, calls for reform of how public housing is managed, it authorizes appropriations for public housing operating subsidies, resident management, and family investment centers through the 1993 and 1994 fiscal years, reduces public housing vacancies, replacement, and revitalization plans of distressed public housing, and providing Section 8 assistance for low-income families to receive rental assistance.

It also amends the Cranston-Gonzalez National Affordable Housing Act of 1990 to set aside money for the Home-ownership and Opportunity for People Everywhere (HOPE) programs, the pet project of Jack Kemp, then Secretary of Housing and Urban Development. It directs the Secretary to reduce the fund matching requirement for HOPE I (Public and Indian housing) home-ownership programs. It allows for mutual housing associations to apply for HOPE II grants (for home-ownership of multifamily units). Lastly, it gives families residing in public or Indian housing the ability to move to vacant units under the HOPE III program (home-ownership of single-family homes).

The purpose was to establish funding and a system of checks and balances over government-sponsored entities that work on housing needs.

Title XV of this act is known as the Annunzio-Wylie Anti-Money Laundering Act, which adds penalties for banks found guilty of money laundering - such as revoking their FDIC insurance. It also created the requirement for Suspicious Activity Reports, and formed the Bank Secrecy Act Advisory Group.

== See also ==
- Housing and Community Development Act of 1977
- Housing and Community Development Act of 1987
