= Housing Act of 1961 =

Act of the United States Congress

- Long title: An Act to assist in the provision of housing for moderate and low income families, to promote orderly urban development, to extend and amend laws relating to housing, urban renewal, and community facilities, and for other purposes.
- Enacted by: the 87th United States Congress

Citations
- Public law: 87-70
- Statutes at Large: 75 Stat. 149

Codification
- Acts amended: National Housing Act of 1934

Legislative history
- Introduced in the Senate as S. 1922 on May 19, 1961; Committee consideration by Banking; Passed the Senate on June 12, 1961 (Passed); Passed the House on June 22, 1961 (Passed); Signed into law by President John F. Kennedy on June 30, 1961

The Housing Act of 1961 (Pub. L. 87–70, 75 Stat. 149) was a United States federal statute enacted by the 87th United States Congress and signed into law on June 30, 1961 by President John F. Kennedy. It is the primary housing legislation passed during his tenure.

The Act authorized nearly $4.2 billion ($47 billion in CPI-inflation adjusted dollars) in federal grants and loans for housing construction and urban public works programs, as well as a "discretionary" sum of $1.5 billion in new mortgage buying authority for the Federal National Mortgage Association. This sum covered rental subsidies and funding for local authorities to construct 100,000 units of public housing, $75 million for new housing for the elderly, $1.2 billion in loans for the construction of college dormitories, new loans for home improvement, an extension and expansion of existing loan programs for farm and nonfarm rural housing, $450 million in low-interest loans for water management-related public works, and $2 billion in matching grants for urban renewal and slum clearance, covering up to two-thirds of the cost of rehabilitation. The Act also permitted the trialling of new low-interest, FHA-insured loans to nonprofit corporations, co-operatives and local public agencies to build moderate-income housing.

== See also ==
- National Housing Act of 1934
- Housing Act of 1937
- Housing Act of 1949
- Housing Act of 1954
- Housing and Urban Development Act of 1965
- Civil Rights Act of 1968
