= United States Department of Housing and Urban Development =

U.S. Federal government department

- Seal of the U.S. Department of Housing and Urban Development

- Flag of the United States Department of Housing and Urban Development

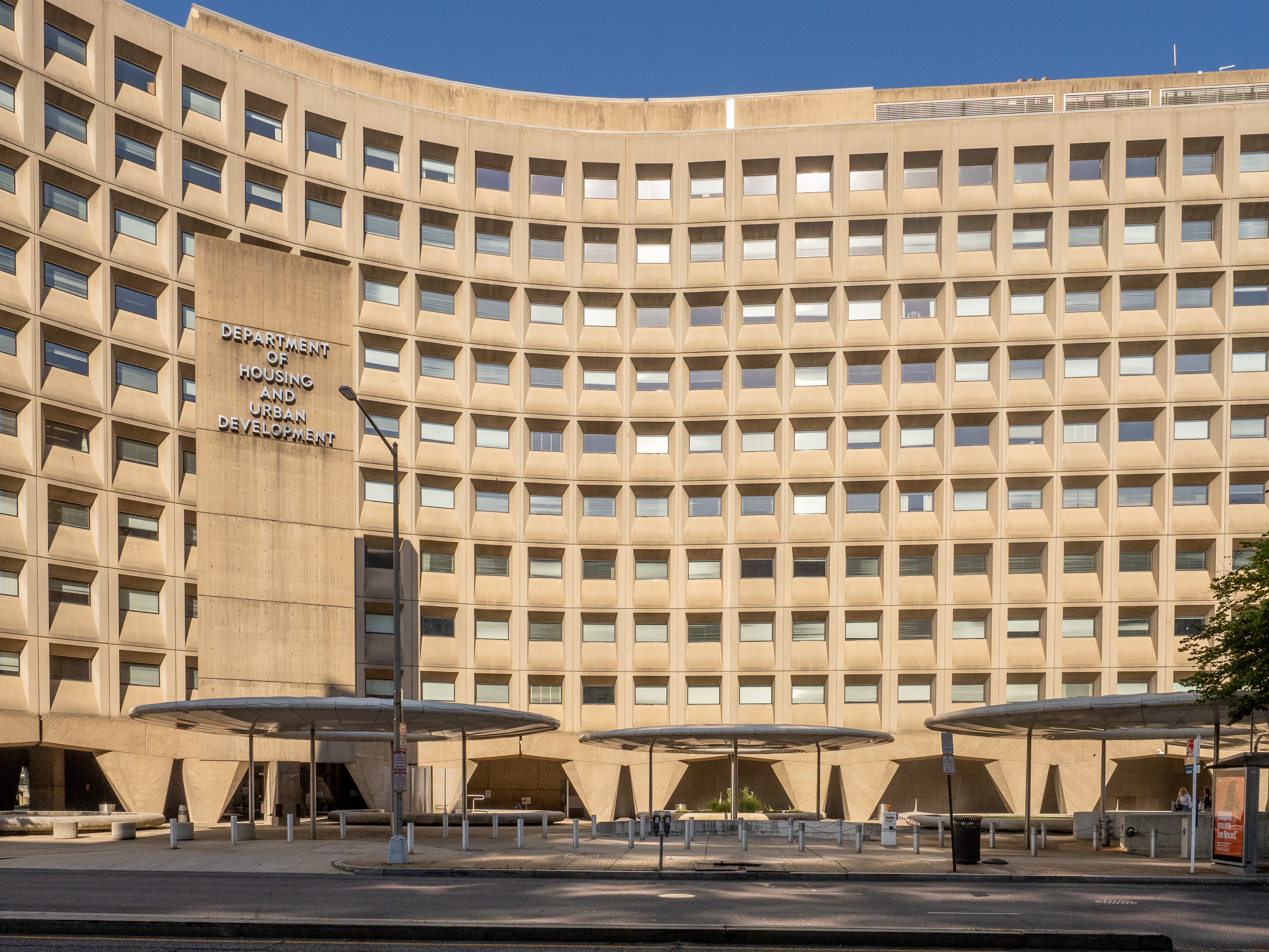
- Robert C. Weaver Federal Building, Department Headquarters prior to 2025

Agency overview
- Formed: September 9, 1965; 61 years ago
- Preceding agency: Department of Housing and Urban Development Act
- Jurisdiction: Federal government of the United States
- Headquarters: Robert C. Weaver Federal Building 451 7th Street SW, Washington, D.C.; 38°53′2.17″N 77°1′21.03″W
- Employees: 7,240 (FY2021 FTE)
- Annual budget: $60.3 billion (FY2021) (Note: For FY2021, $60.3 billion is the gross discretionary budget authority, which does not account for budgetary savings from offsets and other sources. The net discretionary budget authority, which does account for these savings, is $15 billion lower, at $45.3 billion. For more information, consult the "Totals" section on pages 1-3 of reference 2.)
- Secretary responsible: Scott Turner
- Deputy Secretary responsible: Andrew D. Hughes
- Key document: Department of Housing and Urban Development Act
- Website: hud.gov

The United States Department of Housing and Urban Development (HUD) is one of the executive departments of the U.S. federal government. It administers federal housing and urban development laws. It is headed by the secretary of housing and urban development, who reports directly to the president of the United States and is a member of the president's Cabinet.

Although its beginnings were in the House and Home Financing Agency, it was founded as a Cabinet department in 1965, as part of the "Great Society" program of President Lyndon B. Johnson, to develop and execute policies on housing and metropolises.

== History ==
The idea of a department of Urban Affairs was proposed in a 1957 report to President Dwight D. Eisenhower, led by New York governor Nelson A. Rockefeller. The idea of a department of Housing and Urban Affairs was taken up by President John F. Kennedy, with Pennsylvania Senator and Kennedy ally Joseph S. Clark Jr. listing it as one of the top seven legislative priorities for the administration in internal documents.

The department was established on September 9, 1965, when President Lyndon B. Johnson signed the Department of Housing and Urban Development Act into law. It stipulated that the department was to be created no later than November 8, sixty days following the date of enactment. The actual implementation was postponed until January 14, 1966, following the completion of a special study group report on the federal role in solving urban problems.

HUD is administered by the U.S. secretary of housing and urban development. Its headquarters was located in the Robert C. Weaver Federal Building from 1968 to 2025, when HUD announced that it would move to Alexandria, Virginia. Some important milestones for HUD's development include:

- June 27, 1934 – The National Housing Act creates the Federal Housing Administration, which helps provide mortgage insurance on loans made by FHA-approved lenders.
- September 1, 1937 – Housing Act of 1937 creates the U.S. Housing Authority, which helps enact slum clearance projects and construction of low-rent housing.
- February 3, 1938 – The National Housing Act Amendments of 1938 is signed into law. The law creates the Federal National Mortgage Association (FNMA), which provides a secondary market to the Federal Housing Administration.
- February 24, 1942 – Executive Order 9070, Establishing the National Housing Agency. The Federal Housing Administration, the Federal Home Loan Bank Board, The Home Owners' Loan Corporation, The United States Housing Authority, defense housing under the Federal Works Agency, the War Department, the Navy Department, the Farm Security Administration, the Defense Homes Corporation, the Federal Loan Administration, and the Division of Defense Housing Coordination were consolidated. The National Housing Agency would be made up of three units, each with its own commissioner. The units were the Federal Housing Administration, the Federal Home Loan Bank Administration, and the United States Housing Authority.
- July 27, 1947 – The Housing and Home Finance Agency is established through Reorganization Plan Number 3.
- July 15, 1949 – The Housing Act of 1949 is enacted to help eradicate slums and promote community development and redevelopment programs.
- August 2, 1954 – The Housing Act of 1954 establishes comprehensive planning assistance.
- September 23, 1959 – The Housing Act of 1959 allows funds for elderly housing.
- September 2, 1964 – The Housing Act of 1964 allows rehabilitation loans for homeowners.
- August 10, 1965 – The Housing and Urban Development Act of 1965 instituted several major expansions in federal housing programs.
- September 1965 – HUD is created as a cabinet-level agency by the Department of Housing and Urban Development Act.
- April 1968 – The Fair Housing Act is passed to ban discrimination in housing.
- During 1968 – The Housing and Urban Development Act of 1968 establishes the Government National Mortgage Association (Ginnie Mae).
- August 1969 – The Brooke Amendment establishes that low income families only pay no more than 25 percent of their income for rent.
- August 1974 – Housing and Community Development Act of 1974 allows community development block grants and help for urban homesteading.
- October 1977 – The Housing and Community Act of 1977 sets up Urban Development Grants and continues elderly and handicapped assistance.
- July 1987 – The Stewart B. McKinney Homeless Assistance Act gives help to communities to deal with homelessness. It includes the creation of the United States Interagency Council on Homelessness of which HUD is a member.
- February 1988 – The Housing and Community Development Act provides for the sale of public housing to resident management corporations.
- October 1992 – The HOPE VI program starts to revitalize public housing and how it works.
- October 1992 – The Housing and Community Development Act of 1992 codifies within its language the Federal Housing Enterprises Financial Safety and Soundness Act of 1992 that creates the Office of Federal Housing Enterprise Oversight, and mandates HUD to set goals for lower income and underserved housing areas for the GSEs Fannie Mae and Freddie Mac.
- 1992 – Federal Housing Enterprises' Financial Safety and Soundness Act of 1992 creates HUD Office of Federal Housing Enterprise Oversight to provide public oversight of FNMA and Federal Home Loan Mortgage Corporation (Freddie Mac).
- 1993 – Henry G. Cisneros is named Secretary of HUD by President William J. Clinton, January 22. Empowerment Zone and Enterprise Community program becomes law as part of the Omnibus Budget Reconciliation Act of 1993.
- 1995 – "Blueprint for Reinvention of HUD" proposes sweeping changes in public housing reform and FHA, consolidation of other programs into three block grants.
- 1996 – Homeownership totals 66.3 million American households, the largest number ever.
- 1997 – Andrew M. Cuomo is named by President Clinton to be Secretary of Housing and Urban Development, the first appointment ever from within the department.
- 1998 – HUD opens Enforcement Center to take action against HUD-assisted multifamily property owners and other HUD fund recipients who violate laws and regulations. Congress approves Public Housing reforms to reduce segregation by race and income, encourage and reward work, bring more working families into public housing, and increase the availability of subsidized housing for very poor families.
- 2000 – America's homeownership rate reaches a new record-high of 67.7 percent in the third quarter of 2000. A total of 71.6 million American families own their homes - more than at any time in American history.
- 2001 – Mel Martinez, named by President George W. Bush to be Secretary of Housing and Urban Development, is unanimously confirmed by the U.S. Senate on January 23, 2001.
- 2004 – Alphonso Jackson, named by President George W. Bush to be Secretary of Housing and Urban Development, is unanimously confirmed by the U.S. Senate on March 31, 2004. Mr. Jackson is the first Deputy Secretary to subsequently be named Secretary.
- 2007 – HUD initiates program providing seller concessions to buyers of HUD homes, allowing them to use a down payment of $100.
- 2013 – HUD announces it will "close its offices on May 24 and possibly six other days" as a result of the budget sequestration in 2013.

== Agencies ==
=== Agencies ===
- Federal Housing Administration

=== Offices ===
- Center for Faith-Based and Neighborhood Partnerships (HUD)
- Departmental Enforcement Center
- Office of Community Planning and Development
- Office of Congressional and Intergovernmental Relations
- Office of Equal Employment Opportunity
- Office of Fair Housing and Equal Opportunity
- Office of Field Policy and Management
- Office of the General Counsel
- Office of Healthy Homes and Lead Hazard Control
- Office of Hearings and Appeals
- Office of Labor Relations
- Office of Policy Development and Research
- Office of Public Affairs
- Office of Public and Indian Housing
- Office of Small and Disadvantaged Business Utilization
- Office of Sustainable Housing and Communities

=== Corporation ===
- Government National Mortgage Association (Ginnie Mae)

== Organizational structure ==
=== Major programs ===
The major program offices are:

- Community Planning and Development: Many major affordable housing and homelessness programs are administered under Community Planning and Development. These include the Community Development Block Grants (CDBG), the HOME program, Shelter Plus Care, Emergency Shelter Grants (ESG), Section 8 Moderate Rehabilitation Single Room Occupancy program (Mod Rehab SRO), and Housing Opportunities for Persons with AIDS (HOPWA).
- Housing: This office is responsible for the Federal Housing Administration; mission regulation of Fannie Mae and Freddie Mac; regulation of manufactured housing; administration of multifamily housing programs, including Supportive Housing for the Elderly (Section 202) and Supportive Housing for Persons with Disabilities (Section 811); Project-Based Section 8 and healthcare facility loan insurance.
- Public and Indian Housing: This office administers the public housing program HOPE VI, the Housing Choice Voucher Program (formerly – yet more popularly – known as Section 8), Project-Based Vouchers, and individual loan programs housing block grants for Native American tribes, Native Hawaiians and Alaskans.
- Office of Fair Housing and Equal Opportunity: This office enforces federal laws against discrimination based on race, color, religion, national origin, sex, disability, and familial status.
- Policy Development and Research (PD&R): This office is responsible for maintaining current information on housing needs, market conditions, and existing programs, as well as conducting research on priority housing and community development issues through the HUD USER Clearinghouse.
- Government National Mortgage Association, or Ginnie Mae
- Healthy Homes and Lead Hazard Control
- Partnership for Advancing Technology in Housing, developed in 1998

=== Office of Inspector General ===
The United States Congress enacted the Inspector General Act of 1978 to ensure integrity and efficiency in government. The inspector general is appointed by the president and subject to Senate confirmation. They are responsible for conducting and supervising audits, investigations, and inspections relating to the programs and operations of HUD. The OIG is to examine, evaluate and, where necessary, critique these operations and activities, recommending ways for the department to carry out its responsibilities in the most effective, efficient, and economical manner possible.

The mission of the Office of Inspector General (OIG) is to:

- Promote the integrity, efficiency, and effectiveness of HUD programs and operations to assist the department in meeting its mission
- Detect and prevent waste, fraud, and abuse
- Seek administrative sanctions, civil recoveries, and/or criminal prosecution of those responsible for waste, fraud and abuse in HUD programs and operations

The OIG accomplishes its mission by conducting investigations pertinent to its activities; by keeping Congress, the Secretary, and the public fully informed of its activities, and by working with staff (in this case of HUD) in achieving success of its objectives and goals. The Honorable Rae Oliver Davis, who was appointed on January 23, 2019, is the current Inspector General.

=== Budget and staffing ===
The Department of Housing and Urban Development was authorized a budget for Fiscal Year 2015 of $48.3 billion. The budget authorization is broken down as outlined in the following chart.

Program	Funding (in billions)
Discretionary Spending
Management and Administration	$1.9
Public and Indian Housing	$28.7
Community Planning and Development	$6.8
Housing Programs	$11.7
Offsetting Receipts	($8.3)
Mandatory Spending
Mandatory Programs	$7.3
Total	$48.3

== Criticisms ==
A scandal arose in the 1990s when at least 700 houses were sold for profit by real estate speculators taking the loans; at least 19 were arrested. The scandal devastated the Brooklyn and Harlem housing market, with $70 million in HUD loans going into default. Critics said that the department's lax oversight of their program allowed the fraud to occur. In 1997, the HUD Inspector General issued a report saying: "The program design encourages risky property deals, land sale, and refinance schemes, overstated property appraisals, and phony or excessive fees." In June 1993, HUD Secretary Henry Cisneros admitted that "HUD has in many cases exacerbated the declining quality of life in America." In 1996, Vice President Al Gore, referring to public housing projects, declared that, "These crime-infested monuments to a failed policy are killing the neighborhoods around them".

HUD Assistant Secretary for Fair Housing Roberta Achtenberg has been quoted as saying "HUD walks a tightrope between free speech and fair housing. We are ever mindful of the need to maintain the proper balance between these rights." Libertarian critic James Bovard commented that, "The more aggressive HUD becomes, the fewer free speech rights Americans have. Many words and phrases are now effectively forbidden in real estate ads... Apparently, there are two separate versions of the Bill of Rights -- one for private citizens and the other for federal bureaucrats and politicians".

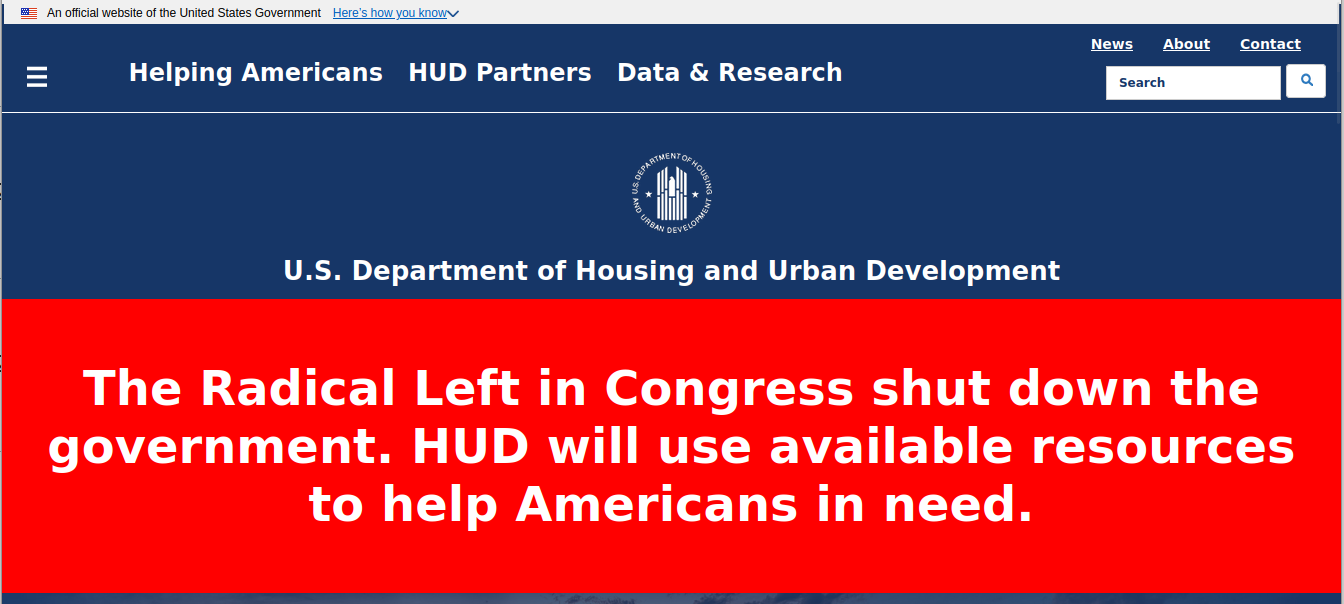
The HUD shutdown notice causing the Hatch Act complaint over secretary Turner

In 2006, The Village Voice named HUD "New York City's worst landlord" and "the #1 worst in the United States" based upon decrepit conditions of buildings and questionable eviction practices.

In September 2010, HUD started auctioning off delinquent home mortgage loans, defined as at least 90 days past due, to the highest bidder. It sold 2,000 loans in six national auctions. In 2012, this sale was massively increased under a "Distressed Asset Stabilization Program" (DASP), and the 100,000 loans sold as of 2014 have netted $8.8 billion for the FHA, rebuilding cash reserves that had been depleted by loan defaults. The second stated and eponymous objective is to stabilize communities, by requiring purchasers to service the loans in a manner that stabilizes the surrounding communities by getting the loans to re-perform, renting the home to the borrower, gifting the property to a land bank or paying off the loans in full. An audit published August 2014 found "only about 11 percent of the loans sold through DASP [were] considered 're-performing'". "Rather than defaulting—[FHA] keeps many of the properties they’re tied to from going through the typical foreclosure process. As a result, the FHA might actually be diverting housing stock from first-time homebuyers, the very group it was formed to serve..."

In October 2025 the watchdog group Public Citizen filed a Hatch Act complaint against Scott Turner as HUD secretary alleging that the HUD's shutdown notice about the 2025 United States federal government shutdown was "electioneering" while on duty.

== Related legislation ==
- 1944 – Servicemen's Readjustment Act, Pub. L. 78–346
- 1949 – Housing Act, Pub. L. 81–171
- 1950 – Housing Act, Pub. L. 81–475
- 1951 – Defense Housing Act, Pub. L. 82–139
- 1952 – 550 Veterans Readjustment Assistance Act, Pub. L. 82–325
- 1954 – Housing Act, Pub. L. 83–560
- 1959 – Housing Act, Pub. L. 86–372
- 1962 – Senior Citizens Housing Act, Pub. L. 87–723
- 1965 – Housing and Urban Development Act of 1965, Pub. L. 89–117
- 1965 – Department of Housing and Urban Development Act, Pub. L. 89–174
- 1968 – Housing and Urban Development Act of 1968, Pub. L. 90–448
- 1974 – Housing and Urban Development Act, Pub.L. 93-383
- 1976 – Housing and Urban Development Act, Pub.L. 94-375
- 1986 – Tax Reform Act of 1986, Pub.L. 99-514
  - Low-Income Housing Tax Credit
- 1987 – Housing and Community Development Act of 1987, Pub. L. 100–242
- 1987 – Stewart B. McKinney Homeless Assistance Act, Pub. L. 100–77
- 1989 – Department of Housing and Urban Development Reform Act of 1989, Pub. L. 101–235
- 1989 - H.R.2916 - Departments of Veterans Affairs and Housing and Urban Development, Independent Agencies Appropriations Act, 1990,
- 1990 – Cranston-Gonzalez National Affordable Housing Act, Pub. L. 101–625
- 1992 – Housing and Community Development Act of 1992, Pub. L. 102–550
  - Federal Housing Enterprises Financial Safety and Soundness Act of 1992, U.S. Code: Title 12, Chapter 46
- 2009 – American Recovery and Reinvestment Act of 2009, abbreviated ARRA, Pub. L. 111–5 (text) (PDF)
  - Repairing and modernizing public housing, including increasing the energy efficiency of units, $4 billion to the Department of Housing and Urban Development (HUD)

== See also ==
- Affirmatively Furthering Fair Housing
- Mortgage Discrimination
- Moving to Opportunity
- Regulatory Barriers Clearinghouse
- Title 12 of the Code of Federal Regulations
- Title 24 of the Code of Federal Regulations
- Data.gov
- USAFacts
- Housing discrimination in the United States
