= Brooke Amendment =

United States housing amendment

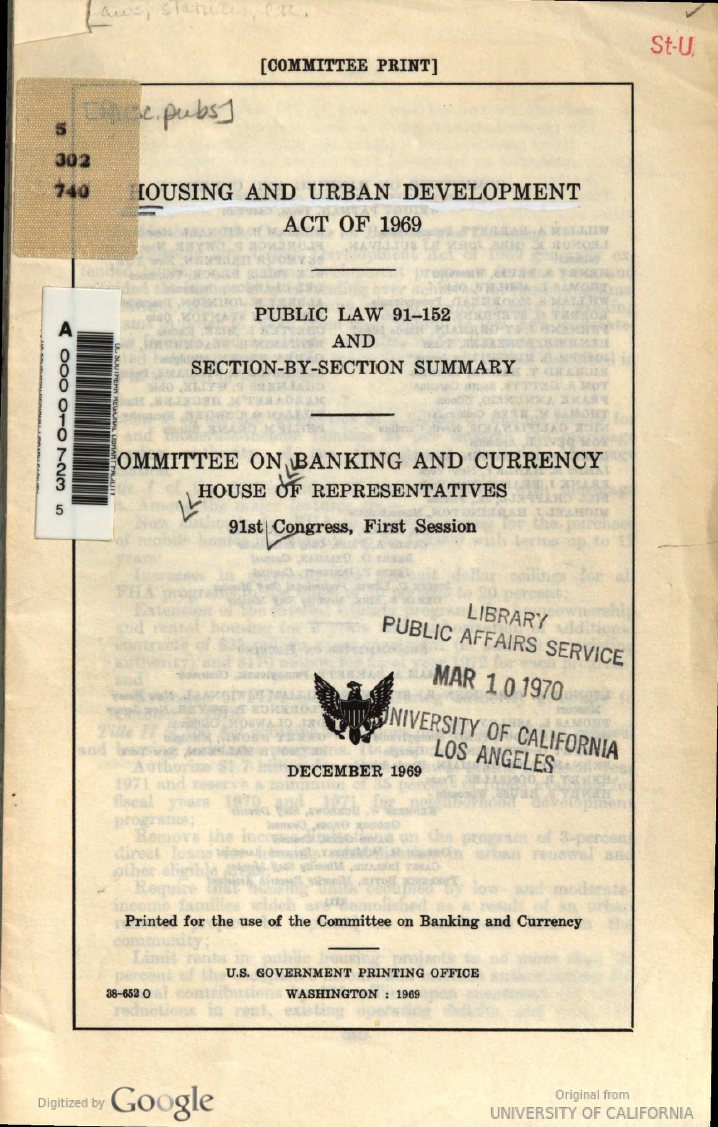
Cover of the Housing and Urban Development Act of 1969

“Brooke Amendment” is the common name for section 213 (a) of the Housing and Urban Development Act of 1969 (Public Law 91-152) that was sponsored by Senator Edward Brooke III (R-MA), which capped rent in public housing projects at 25% of tenant's income. It amended section 2(1), paragraph two, of the US Housing Act of 1937, and was enacted on Christmas Eve, 24 December 1969. The Brooke Amendment became the first instance of the benchmark to measure housing affordability, which became known as the "30 percent rule of thumb" in 1981 when the 25 percent cap was raised to 30 percent of tenant income.

Senator Brooke advocated for two other subsections that were enacted in the Housing and Urban Development Act of 1969. Section 213 (b) gives the Secretary of Housing and Urban Development (HUD) authority to revoke the 25 percent cap if it results in a reduction of total welfare assistance. Section 213 (c) amends section 14 of the Housing Act of 1937 to ensure the "low-rent character of public housing projects" by fixing annual contract contributions according to the current Federal rate of interest. Together, the three subsections can be referred to as the "Brooke Amendments", although the pluralized term is less common.
