= San Francisco Housing Authority =

American local government agency

Housing Authority of the City and County of San Francisco
Agency overview
- Formed: 1938; 88 years ago
- Jurisdiction: City and County of San Francisco
- Headquarters: 1815 Egbert Avenue, San Francisco, California 94124
- Agency executive: Tonia Lediju, Chief Executive Officer
- Website: sfha.org

The San Francisco Housing Authority is a local public housing authority for the City and County of San Francisco that was established in 1938 after the Housing Act of 1937 was enacted by the U.S. Federal Government. The agency is responsible for the management of public housing and Section 8 vouchers for primarily low-income housing. While the agency is based in and has jurisdiction over San Francisco, it is operated independent of the city's government and is chartered by the state government of California.

== History ==
The agency was established in 1938, a year after the federal Housing Act of 1937, in order to build and run public housing developments in San Francisco. Due to lobbying from local residents, the agency primarily built its public housing buildings in low-income neighborhoods. For example, proposed public housing in the city's Richmond District was protested, with residents claiming they wished to keep their neighborhood a "first-class residential district, rather than a ‘slum housing project.’".

By 2012, the San Francisco Housing Authority was considered a "troubled" agency by HUD, the federal agency that oversees local housing authorities, with a backlog of deferred maintenance on its properties. In 2013, Mayor Ed Lee pushed to reorganize the failing agency. Among the measures adopted was to enter all of the 29 of the Authority's public housing buildings into the Rental Assistance Demonstration program, which would privatize the buildings by transferring their management to non-profit housing organizations

In 2018, the Authority came under scrutiny for discovering that it had a $29.5 million shortfall in its budget due to poor accounting practices. The agency plans to bridge the budget gap with the help of the federal HUD agency and with financial assistance from the San Francisco government.

Due to the agency's failures in accounting and administration, HUD sent a letter in March 2019 ordering the Authority to cede the administration of its programs either to the federal government or to the municipal government of San Francisco. The agency was ultimately taken over by the municipal government, and after spending two years restructuring the agency's operations and finances, was able to receive concurrence from HUD that its finances were in better shape.
