= Housing and Urban Development Act of 1968 =

United States law

- Long title: An act to assist in the provision of housing for low and moderate income families, and to extend and amend laws relating to housing and urban development.
- Enacted by: the 90th United States Congress
- Effective: August 1, 1968

Citations
- Public law: 90-448

Codification
- Titles amended: Title 12—Banks and Banking; Title 42—Public Health and Welfare

Legislative history
- Introduced in the Senate as S. 3497 by John Sparkman (D–AL) on March, 1968; Committee consideration by Banking; Passed the Senate on May 28, 1968 (67–4); Passed the House on July 26, 1968 (228-135); Signed into law by President Lyndon B. Johnson on August 1, 1968

The Housing and Urban Development Act of 1968, Pub. L. 90–448, 82 Stat. 476, enacted August 1, 1968, was passed during the Lyndon B. Johnson Administration. The act came on the heels of major riots across cities throughout the U.S. in 1967, the assassination of Civil Rights Leader Martin Luther King Jr. in April 1968, and the publication of the report of the Kerner Commission, which recommended major expansions in public funding and support of urban areas. President Lyndon B. Johnson referred to the legislation as one of the most significant laws ever passed in the U.S., due to its scale and ambition. The act's declared intention was constructing or rehabilitating 26 million housing units, 6 million of these for low- and moderate-income families, over the next 10 years.

The act authorized $5.3 billion in spending over its first three years, designed to fund 1.7 million units over that time. In the longer term, the act was designed to cost $50 billion over 10 years, had it ever been fully implemented. Its policies were to be implemented by the United States Department of Housing and Urban Development, which had been created in 1965.

The legislation provided a significant expansion in funding for public programs, such as Public Housing. But it also marked a shift in federal programs, increasingly focusing on using private developers as a strategy to encourage housing production of affordable units. Though the program's 10-year ambitions were not achieved, in some ways it set the tone for future U.S. approaches to policy because of this focus on public-private joint initiatives in achieving public ends.

== The creation of Ginnie Mae and new financing programs ==
The Act established Ginnie Mae to expand availability of mortgage funds for moderate income families using government-guaranteed mortgage-backed securities. The new entity was split from the formerly government-controlled Fannie Mae, which retained other functions under that same name and was privatized. The new entity was under the purview of the United States Department of Housing and Urban Development and its Federal Housing Administration.

The Act's major programs included Section 235 guarantees for lenders to offer mortgages for low- and moderate-income families with $200 down and 20% of a household's salary, and 1% mortgage interest rates. These guarantees were insured by the Federal Housing Administration.

The way Section 235 was designed, however, led to problems. Borrowers were submitted to limited credit requirements, and first-time buyer education was minimally provided. The Rouse Company used Section 235 to resell hundreds of homes that had been condemned and abandoned for a cancelled highway project in Baltimore, Maryland. After poor results, the highway project was renewed.

Section 235, in some cases, increased segregation; white families were encouraged to purchase in suburban, newly developed areas, whereas black families, held up by exclusionary practices, primarily purchased homes in lower-income, central-city areas. This pattern increased the wealth of many white families while leaving many black families behind. Though Section 235 provided aid to about a half a million families and cost the federal government $1.37 billion by 1974, the program featured very high rates of housing abandonment due to families being unable to pay the mortgage (10% of families foreclosed).

The act also included the more-successful Section 236 assistance for moderate-income renters, replacing the 221(d)(3) Below-Market-Interest Rate program that had been created by the 1961 Housing Act. As with Section 235, developers would receive a subsidy to reduce their mortgage interest rate to just 1%. This program was used to support the majority of housing built by New York's prolific Empire State Development Corporation, then known as the Urban Development Corporation, and which completed roughly 30,000 housing units between 1968 and 1975.

== Subsidies for low- and moderate-income housing and community redevelopment ==
The legislation provided hundreds of millions of dollars for the public housing, Model Cities, and Urban Renewal programs, all intended to aid low-income communities. The rent supplement program, which had been initially authorized under the Housing and Urban Development Act of 1965 and which provided funds for private landlords to accept low-income tenants (and can be seen as the predecessor of the Section 8 program), was also expanded.

The legislation encouraged new forms for public housing, discouraging the towers-in-the-park that had characterized previous designs in many large U.S. cities. One of its key sections was a promotion of higher architectural standards. The legislation specifically noted that "except in the case of housing predominantly for the elderly... the Secretary [of Housing and Urban Development] shall not approve high-rise elevator projects for families with children unless he makes a determination that there is no practical alternative."

The act successfully expanded production of housing in the U.S. during the four years that followed. Between 1969 and 1972, for example, the U.S. government funded more than 340,000 units of public housing. These were produced "conventionally,” meaning public financing and public operations, but also through turnkey (a private builder taking on responsibility for financing and construction), acquisition (purchase by the public of an existing building), and leasing.

== Title IV New Towns ==
Title IV, provided funding for New Town projects. The initial funding of $500 million was reduced to $250 million. Jonathan, Minnesota, and Park Forest South, Illinois developments were the first to utilize this funding.

- Jonathan, Minnesota
- Park Forest South, Illinois
- Flower Mound, Texas
- St. Charles, Maryland

(Several communities also applied as Title VII new towns with the follow-on National Urban Policy and New Community Development Act of 1970)

== The program's end and legacy ==
In early 1973, President Richard Nixon placed a moratorium on new federal housing subsidies, making the 1968 Act's goals impossible to achieve. This moratorium was not lifted until the passage of the Housing and Community Development Act of 1974.

== See also ==
- Federal National Mortgage Association Charter Act, Title II of the Housing Act of 1954, Pub. L. 83–560, 68 Stat. 590, enacted August 2, 1954
