= Title 24 of the Code of Federal Regulations =

U.S. federal rules and regulations on housing and urban development

CFR Title 24 - Housing and Urban Development is one of fifty titles comprising the United States Code of Federal Regulations (CFR), containing the principal set of rules and regulations issued by federal agencies regarding housing and urban development. It is available in digital and printed form, and can be referenced online using the Electronic Code of Federal Regulations (e-CFR).

== Structure ==
The table of contents, as reflected in the e-CFR updated March 4, 2014, is as follows:

Volume	Chapter	Parts	Regulatory Entity
1		0-99	Office of the Secretary, Department of Housing and Urban Development
	I	100-199	Office of Assistant Secretary for Equal Opportunity, Department of Housing and Urban Development
2	II	200-299	Office of Assistant Secretary for Housing-Federal Housing Commissioner, Department of Housing and Urban Development
	III	300-399	Government National Mortgage Association, Department of Housing and Urban Development
	IV	400-499	Office of Housing and Office of Multifamily Housing Assistance Restructuring, Department of Housing and Urban Development
3	V	500-599	Office of Assistant Secretary for Community Planning and Development, Department of Housing and Urban Development
	VI	600-699 [Reserved]	Office of Assistant Secretary for Community Planning and Development, Department of Housing and Urban Development
4	VII	700-799	Office of the Secretary, Department of Housing and Urban Development (Housing Assistance Programs and Public and Indian Housing Programs)
	VIII	800-899	Office of the Assistant Secretary for Housing—Federal Housing Commissioner, Department of Housing and Urban Development (Section 8 Housing Assistance Programs, Section 202 Direct Loan Program, Section 202 Supportive Housing for the Elderly Program and Section 811 Supportive Housing for Persons With Disabilities Program)
	IX	900-1699	Office of Assistant Secretary for Public and Indian Housing, Department of Housing and Urban Development
5	X	1700-1799	Office of Assistant Secretary for Housing—Federal Housing Commissioner, Department of Housing and Urban Development (Interstate Land Sales Registration Program)
	XII	2000-2099	Office of Inspector General, Department of Housing and Urban Development
	XV	2700-2799	Emergency Mortgage Insurance and Loan Programs, Department of Housing and Urban Development
	XX	3200-3899	Office of Assistant Secretary for Housing—Federal Housing Commissioner, Department of Housing and Urban Development
	XXIV	4000-4099	Board of Directors of the HOPE for Homeowners Program
	XXV	4100-4199	Neighborhood Reinvestment Corporation
