= Office of Public and Indian Housing =

- Seal of the U.S. Department of Housing and Urban Development

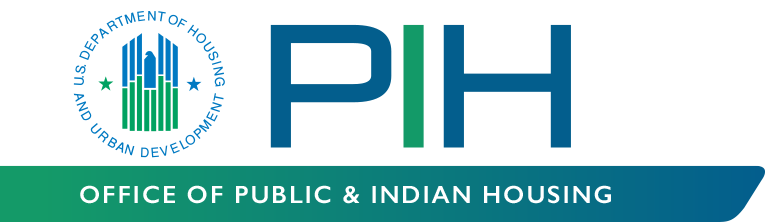
- Logo of the Office of Public and Indian Housing

Office overview
- Formed: 1937
- Jurisdiction: United States
- Headquarters: Robert C. Weaver Federal Building Washington, D.C.
- Office executives: Ben Hobbs, Assistant Secretary for Public and Indian Housing; Dominique Blom, General Deputy Assistant Secretary
- Parent department: Department of Housing and Urban Development
- Key document: Housing Act of 1937
- Website: www.hud.gov

The Office of Public and Indian Housing (PIH) is an agency of the U.S. Department of Housing and Urban Development. Its mission is to ensure safe, decent, and affordable housing, create opportunities for residents' self-sufficiency and economic independence, and assure the fiscal integrity of all program participants.

The Office is headed by a senate-confirmed Assistant Secretary of Housing and Urban Development for Public and Indian Housing. Since the resignation of Hunter Kurtz on January 11, 2021, the office has been led by the Senior Official, General Deputy Assistant Secretary Dominique Blom.

== Background ==
PIH is responsible for administering and managing a range of programs authorized and funded by Congress under the basic provisions of the U.S. Housing Act of 1937. This act was created to provide affordable housing to well over a million households nationwide. This act actually created the Public and Indian Housing program as well.

The United States Congress dictated for funds to be dedicated not only for the development of additional public and Indian housing units, but also for the modernization of the housing stock, the improvement of the management of the programs by the public and Indian housing authorities which own the housing, and for programs to address crime and security and provide supportive services and tenant opportunities. The programs are administered by the:

- Office of Community Relations and Involvement
- Office of Public and Assisted Housing Operations (including the housing choice voucher tenant based rental assistance program)
- Office of Public Housing Investments
- Office of Policy, Program and Legislative Initiatives

== See also ==
- Native American Housing Assistance and Self-Determination Act of 1996
- Little Earth, a subsidized housing project in Minneapolis with American Indian preference
- Title 24 of the Code of Federal Regulations
- Tohono O'Odham Ki:Ki Association, a tribal housing program
