= Federal Housing Enterprises Financial Safety and Soundness Act of 1992 =

United States law

The Federal Housing Enterprises Financial Safety and Soundness Act of 1992 (or FHEFSSA, Pub. L. 102–550, title XIII of the Housing and Community Development Act of 1992, H.R. 5334, Oct. 28, 1992, 106 Stat. 3941, 12 U.S.C. § 4501 et seq.). The Act established the Office of Federal Housing Enterprise Oversight (OFHEO) within the United States Department of Housing and Urban Development (HUD). It also mandated that HUD set specific goals for the government-sponsored enterprises Fannie Mae and Freddie Mac, with regard to low income and underserved housing areas.
