= Government National Mortgage Association =

Government-owned financial services corporation aimed at low-income housing in the US

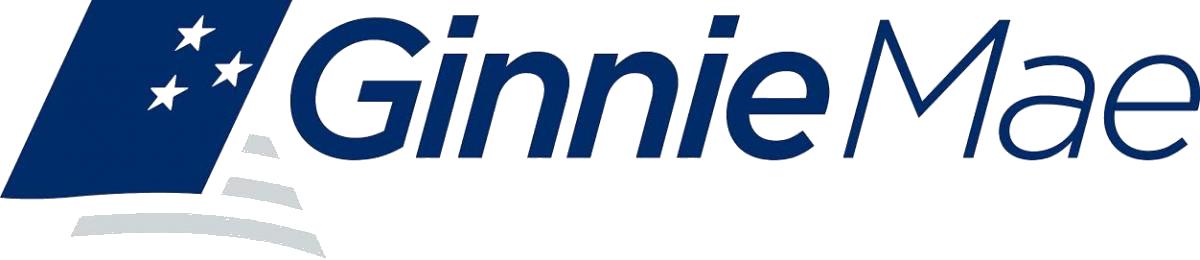
- Founded: 1968; 58 years ago
- Area served: United States
- Key people: Joe Gormley, President
- Parent: United States Department of Housing and Urban Development
- Website: ginniemae.gov

The Government National Mortgage Association (GNMA), or Ginnie Mae, is a government-owned corporation of the United States Federal Government within the Department of Housing and Urban Development (HUD). It was founded in 1968 and supports affordable housing programs by facilitating housing loans (mortgages) thereby lowering financing costs such as interest rates for those loans. It does that by guaranteeing investors the on-time payment of mortgage-backed securities (MBS) even if homeowners default on the underlying mortgages and the homes are foreclosed upon.

Ginnie Mae guarantees only securities backed by single-family and multifamily loans insured by government agencies, including the Federal Housing Administration, the Department of Veterans Affairs, the Department of Housing and Urban Development’s Office of Public and Indian Housing, and the Department of Agriculture’s Rural Development. Ginnie Mae neither originates nor purchases mortgage loans nor buys, sells or issues securities. The credit risk on the mortgage collateral underlying its mortgage-backed securities primarily resides with other insuring government agencies.

Ginnie Mae is similar to Fannie Mae (Federal National Mortgage Association) and Freddie Mac (Federal Home Loan Mortgage Corporation) with the difference being that Ginnie Mae is a wholly owned government corporation whereas Fannie Mae and Freddie Mac are "government-sponsored enterprises" (GSEs), which are federally chartered corporations privately owned by shareholders. Today, Ginnie Mae securities are the only mortgage-backed securities that are backed by the "full faith and credit" guaranty of the United States Federal Government, although some have argued that Fannie Mae and Freddie Mac securities are de facto or "effective" beneficiaries of this guarantee after the Federal Government rescued them from insolvency and placed them under government conservatorship in September 2008 during the Great Recession.

== History ==
In 1934, during the depths of the Great Depression, the United States Congress responded to the crisis by passing the National Housing Act of 1934, which established the Federal Housing Administration (FHA). One of the principal objectives of the FHA was to increase the flow of capital to the housing markets by insuring private lenders against the risk of mortgage default. FHA also was tasked with chartering and regulating a national mortgage association that would buy and sell FHA-insured mortgages. In 1938, Congress amended the act to create the Federal National Mortgage Association, more commonly known as "Fannie Mae", to help mortgage lenders gain further access to capital for mortgage loans.

The provisions of the act changed gradually over the years. It was not until 1968, however, in response to a perceived need to further broaden the capital base available for mortgages, that the housing finance system began to resemble its current form. As part of the Housing and Urban Development Act of 1968, Congress partitioned Fannie Mae into two entities:

- Fannie Mae, which was originally restricted to purchasing Federal Housing Administration and Veterans Administration (VA) mortgages (Fannie Mae was permitted to deal in conventional mortgages in 1970), and
- Ginnie Mae, formerly the Government National Mortgage Association, which originally only provided insurance for bonds issued by FHA and VA mortgages in special affordable housing programs.

In 1970, Ginnie Mae became the first organization to create and guarantee MBS products and has continued to provide mortgage funds for homebuyers ever since.

Today, Ginnie Mae securities are the only mortgage-backed securities that are backed by the "full faith and credit" guaranty of the United States government, although some have argued that Fannie Mae and Freddie Mac securities are de facto or "effective" beneficiaries of this guarantee after the US government rescued them from insolvency in 2008.

== Business ==
Ginnie Mae guarantees the timely payment of principal and interest payments on residential mortgage-backed security (MBS) instruments to institutional investors worldwide. These securities, or “pools” of mortgage loans, are used as collateral for the issuance of securities on Wall Street. MBS instruments are commonly referred to as "pass-through" certificates because the principal and interest of the underlying loans is "passed through" to investors; because of Ginnie Mae's financial backing, these MBS instruments are particularly attractive to investors and, like other Agency MBS instruments, are eligible to be traded in the "to-be-announced," or "TBA" market.

Ginnie Mae guarantees only securities backed by single-family and multifamily loans insured by government agencies, including the FHA, Department of Veterans Affairs, the Department of Housing and Urban Development’s Office of Public and Indian Housing, and the Department of Agriculture’s Rural Development.

Ginnie Mae neither originates nor purchases mortgage loans. It does not purchase, sell, or issue securities. Accordingly, Ginnie Mae does not use derivatives to hedge and it does not carry long-term debt (or related outstanding securities liabilities) on its balance sheet. Instead, private lending institutions approved by Ginnie Mae originate eligible loans, pool them into securities, and issue the Ginnie Mae MBS instruments. These institutions include geographically diverse mortgage companies, commercial banks, and thrifts of all sizes, as well as state housing finance agencies.

== See also ==
- Title 24 of the Code of Federal Regulations
- Federal Home Loan Banks
- Federal Agricultural Mortgage Corporation (Farmer Mac)
- United Student Aid Funds (USA Funds)
- Freddie Mac
- Fannie Mae
- Sallie Mae
