= Housing Act of 1954 =

- Long title: An Act to aid in the provision and improvement of housing, the elimination and prevention of slums, and the conservation and development of urban communities.
- Nicknames: Urban Renewal Act
- Enacted by: the 83rd United States Congress
- Effective: August 2, 1954

Citations
- Public law: Pub. L. 83–560
- Statutes at Large: 68 Stat. 590

Codification
- Acts amended: National Housing Act of 1934, Housing Act of 1949
- U.S.C. sections amended: 12 U.S.C. § 1701 et seq.

Legislative history
- Committee consideration by House Committee on Banking and Currency; Passed the House on April 2, 1954; Passed the Senate on June 3, 1954

The Housing Act of 1954, Pub. L. 83–560, 68 Stat. 590, enacted August 2, 1954, passed during the Dwight D. Eisenhower Administration, comprised a series of amendments to the National Housing Act of 1934, reorienting federal intervention in urban centers away from the slum-clearance and public-housing mandate of the Housing Act of 1949 toward a broader strategy of urban renewal, especially preferring private-sector-led redevelopment. The act reshaped the built environment of hundreds of American cities between the mid-1950s and the 1970s.

The Housing Act of 1954 created the modern urban renewal apparatus, expanded Federal Housing Administration (FHA) mortgage insurance authority, strengthened planning departments nationwide, and altered public housing policy by relaxing several politically controversial requirements. Its programs were administered by the Housing and Home Finance Agency (HHFA), the predecessor to the U.S. Department of Housing and Urban Development (HUD).

== Background ==
Following World War Two, the United States faced a housing shortage in cities, especially for veterans and working class families; and especially with respect to the booming birthrate at the time, which demanded an increase of housing. The previous Housing Act of 1949 attempted to address these issues through the construction of 810,000 public housing units, and aid for cities to clear slums, which was helpful.

By 1953, however, multiple challenges had emerged, and slum clearance proved extremely costly and politically unpopular. Eisenhower, a Republican conservative, sought solutions using or in tandem with private enterprise.

Additionally, cities across the Northeast and Midwest experienced industrial relocation or evacuation, racial segregation (caused to a great extent by FHA redlining and zoning), and quickly growing reliance and preference of the automobile by the American middle class, as well as growing downtown business coalitions seeking modernization (especially building parking garages or tearing down for parking lots downtown, to compete with the shopping mall).

All these factors influenced urban leaders in American cities to press Congress for a more flexible statute of law.

== Implementation ==
Urban renewal projects subsidized and encouraged by this bill in tandem with others proliferated across the United States. Between 1954 and 1974, many urban renewal projects were initiated across nearly 1,200 American cities. The act reshaped downtowns, subsidizing and encouraging many modernist projects to be built. The act displaced great amounts of people, disproportionately people of color and immigrants.

The Housing Act of 1959 laid the foundation of the Housing Act of 1961, the Housing and Urban Development Act of 1965, the Model Cities Program (1966), Uniform Relocation Act (1970), and the Community Development Block Grants (1974), which retired urban renewal, preferring more flexible local aid.

== See also ==
- Mill Creek Valley § Urban renewal project
