= Housing and Community Development Act of 1987 =

- Other short titles: An Act to amend and extend certain laws relating to housing, community and neighborhood development and preservation, and related programs, and for other purposes.
- Nicknames: Emergency Low Income Housing Preservation Act of 1987
- Enacted by: the 100th United States Congress
- Effective: February 5, 1988

Citations
- Public law: 100-242
- Statutes at Large: 101 Stat. 1815

Codification
- Titles amended: 42 U.S.C.: Public Health and Social Welfare
- U.S.C. sections amended: 42 U.S.C. ch. 69 § 5301

Legislative history
- Introduced in the Senate as S. 825 by William Proxmire (D–WI) on March 24, 1987; Committee consideration by Senate Banking, Housing, and Urban Affairs, House Banking, Finance, and Urban Affairs; Passed the Senate on March 31, 1987 (71-27); Passed the House on June 17, 1987 (passed voice vote); Reported by the joint conference committee on November 6, 1987; agreed to by the House on November 9, 1987 (391-1) and by the House on December 21, 1987 (391-2); Senate agreed to amendment on December 21, 1987 (agreed voice vote); Signed into law by President Ronald Reagan on February 5, 1988

The Housing and Community Development Act of 1987, P.L. 100-242, 101 Stat. 1815, is a United States federal law which amended the Housing and Community Development Act laws with regards to the Housing Act of 1937. The amendments revised sections of the Act concerning community and neighborhood development, family and single housing, and preservation for low income home owners. The law provided insurance for FHA Home Equity Conversion Mortgages (HECM) better known as a home equity conversion loan or reverse mortgage.

Title VI of the Act established the Nehemiah Housing Opportunity Grants ("NHOP") program, intended to encourage homeownership by making federal grants to nonprofit organizations who would, in turn, loan funds to low-income families purchasing homes being built or rehabilitated under an approved program. NHOP ceased operation in 1991 when it was repealed by section 289 of the Cranston-Gonzalez National Affordable Housing Act of 1990 (42 USC 12839).

The S. 825 legislation was passed by the 100th U.S. Congressional session and signed into law by the 40th President of the United States Ronald Reagan on February 5, 1988.

== See also ==
- Housing and Community Development Act of 1977
- Housing and Community Development Act of 1992
