= Housing and Community Development Act of 1974 =

Act of Congress

- Other short titles: Housing Cooperation Association Financing Act; National Mobile Home Construction and Safety Standards Act; Revised National Housing Act
- Long title: An Act to establish a program of community development block grants, to amend and extend laws relating to housing and urban development, and for other purposes.
- Nicknames: Community Development Assistance Act of 1974
- Enacted by: the 93rd United States Congress
- Effective: August 22, 1974

Citations
- Public law: 93-383
- Statutes at Large: 88 Stat. 633-2

Codification
- Acts amended: Housing Act of 1937; Civil Rights Act of 1968
- Titles amended: 42 U.S.C.: Public Health and Social Welfare
- U.S.C. sections created: 42 U.S.C. ch. 69 § 5301

Legislative history
- Introduced in the Senate as S. 3066 by John Sparkman (D–AL) on February 27, 1974; Committee consideration by Senate Banking, Housing, and Urban Affairs, House Banking and Currency; Passed the Senate on March 11, 1974 (76-11); Passed the House on June 20, 1974 (351-25, in lieu of H.R. 15361); Reported by the joint conference committee on August 12, 1974; agreed to by the Senate on August 13, 1974 (84-0) and by the House on August 15, 1974 (377-21); Signed into law by President Gerald R. Ford on August 22, 1974

The Housing and Community Development Act of 1974 (Pub. L. 93–383, 88 Stat. 633-2, enacted August 22, 1974) is a United States federal law that, among other provisions, amended the Housing Act of 1937 to create the Section 8 housing program, authorized the United States Department of Housing and Urban Development to award "Entitlement Communities Grants" under the Community Development Block Grant program, created the National Institute of Building Sciences, and established the first federal Urban Homesteading program.

The legislation was passed by the 93rd United States Congress and signed into law by President Gerald Ford on August 22, 1974.

== See also ==
- Mobile Home Construction and Safety Standards Act of 1974
