= Housing and Urban Development Act of 1965 =

US Act of Congress

- Long title: An Act to assist in the provision of housing for low- and moderate-income families, to promote orderly urban development, to improve living environment in urban areas, and to extend and amend laws relating to housing, urban renewal, and community facilities
- Enacted by: the 89th United States Congress
- Effective: August 10, 1968

Citations
- Public law: 89–117
- Statutes at Large: 79 Stat. 451

Codification
- Titles amended: Housing Act of 1949

Legislative history
- Introduced in the House as H.R. 7984 on March, 1968; Committee consideration by Banking; Passed the House on June 30, 1968 (245-169); Passed the Senate on July 15, 1965 (54-30); Signed into law by President Lyndon B. Johnson on August 10, 1965

The Housing and Urban Development Act of 1965 (Pub. L. 89–117, 79 Stat. 451) is a major revision to federal housing policy in the United States which instituted several major expansions in federal housing programs.

The United States Congress passed and President Lyndon B. Johnson signed the legislation on August 9, 1965. Johnson called it "the single most important breakthrough" in federal housing policy since the 1920s. The legislation greatly expanded funding for existing federal housing programs, and rolled-out the precursor to the Section 8 housing program to provide rent subsidies for the elderly and disabled; housing rehabilitation grants to poor homeowners; provisions for veterans to make very low down-payments to obtain mortgages; new authority for families qualifying for public housing to be placed in empty private housing (along with subsidies to landlords); and matching grants to localities for the construction of water and sewer facilities, construction of community centers in low-income areas, and urban beautification. Four weeks later, on September 9, President Johnson signed separate legislation establishing the Department of Housing and Urban Development (Pub. L. 89–174, 79 Stat. 667).
