= National Housing Act of 1934 =

American law passed as part of the New Deal

National Housing Act
- Long title: AN ACT To encourage improvement in housing standards and conditions, to provide a system of mutual mortgage insurance, and for other purposes
- Enacted by: the 73rd United States Congress

Citations
- Public law: Pub. L. 73–479
- Statutes at Large: 48 Stat. 1246

Legislative history
- Introduced in the House as H.R. 9620; Signed into law by President Franklin D. Roosevelt on June 27, 1934

The National Housing Act of 1934, H.R. 9620, Pub. L. 73–479, 48 Stat. 1246, enacted June 27, 1934, also called the Better Housing Program, was part of the New Deal passed during the Great Depression in order to make housing and home mortgages more affordable. It created the Federal Housing Administration (FHA) and the Federal Savings and Loan Insurance Corporation (FSLIC).

The Act was designed to stop the tide of bank foreclosures on family homes during the Great Depression. With this, President Franklin D. Roosevelt used this act to fulfill his goal towards a government program funded by private investments, avoiding the reliance on taxpayer funds. The passing of the bill alleviated unemployment by making credit more accessible through banks and lending organizations. Both the FHA and the FSLIC became the main federal agencies that worked to create the backbone of the mortgage and home building industries, until the 1980s. The FHA's guarantee against losses for mortgage lenders allowed for a system of regular monthly mortgage payments. The FHA mortgage insurance program became an effective strategy for increasing investment in the mortgage market and still continues to be.

== Redlining ==
Home Owners' Loan Corporation Philadelphia redlining map

According to Fishback et al. (2024), the Federal Housing Administration (FHA) and the Home Owners' Loan Corporation (HOLC), which was created in 1933, are associated with redlining and discrimination. They were both created by the New Deal legislation enacted by President Roosevelt to make housing more affordable. However, scholars state they "reinforced racial discrimination" and institutionalized racial residential segregation, through the exclusion of low-income neighborhoods, and the shifted focus on higher valued properties in predominantly White areas. Scholars note many private lenders used the HOLC maps, placing residents in low rated areas at major disadvantages. The FHA evaluated neighborhoods with an assessment of neighborhood quality, stability, and future property value, which Fishback et al. (2024) claims were shaped by racial perceptions.

== Racialization ==
Based on several reports, real estate documents, and housing report analysis, Kevin Fox Gotham (2000) states racialization played a key role in the segregated system and state policy, the FHA and the housing industries in the United States produced. It was greatly fueled by discriminatory ideology during the Great Depression resulting in the involvement of real estate and banking policy organizations. Gotham says "each of these groups accepted the notion that racial housing segregation was essential if residential districts were to retain their stability and desirability."

These policies had disparate impacts on Americans along segregated lines:

Author Richard Rothstein says the housing programs begun under the New Deal were tantamount to a "state-sponsored system of segregation."

The government's efforts were "primarily designed to provide housing to white, middle-class, lower-middle-class families," he says. African-Americans and other people of color were left out of the new suburban communities — and pushed instead into urban housing projects.

The Housing Act of 1937 built on this legislation. Scholars note that prior to the New Deal and the National Housing Act of 1934 there were already racial challenges when it came to housing. These practices involved preventing Black people and other people of color from moving into predominantly White neighborhoods. The National Housing Act of 1934 impacted the racialization of housing and had a role in the civil rights disparities through the legislation it created.
