= Housing Act of 1937 =

Act of the United States Congress

- Long title: An Act to provide financial assistance to the States and political subdivisions thereof for the elimination of unsafe and insanitary housing conditions, for the eradication of slums, for the provision of decent, safe, and sanitary dwellings for families of low income, and for the reduction of unemployment and the stimulation of business activity, to create a United States Housing Authority, and for other purposes.
- Enacted by: the 75th United States Congress
- Effective: September 1, 1937

Citations
- Public law: 75-412
- Statutes at Large: 50 Stat. 888

Legislative history
- Introduced in the Senate as S. 1685 by Robert F. Wagner (D-NY) on July 23, 1937; Committee consideration by Senate Education and Labor, Senate Banking and Currency; Passed the Senate on August 6, 1937 (64-16); Passed the House on August 18, 1937 (275-86); Reported by the joint conference committee on August 19, 1937; agreed to by the House on August 20, 1937 (Agreed) and by the Senate on August 21, 1937 (Agreed); Signed into law by President Franklin D. Roosevelt on September 1, 1937

The Housing Act of 1937 (Pub. L. 75–412, 50 Stat. 888, enacted September 1, 1937), formally the "United States Housing Act of 1937" and sometimes called the Wagner–Steagall Act, provided for subsidies to be paid from the United States federal government to local public housing agencies (LHAs) to improve living conditions for low-income families.

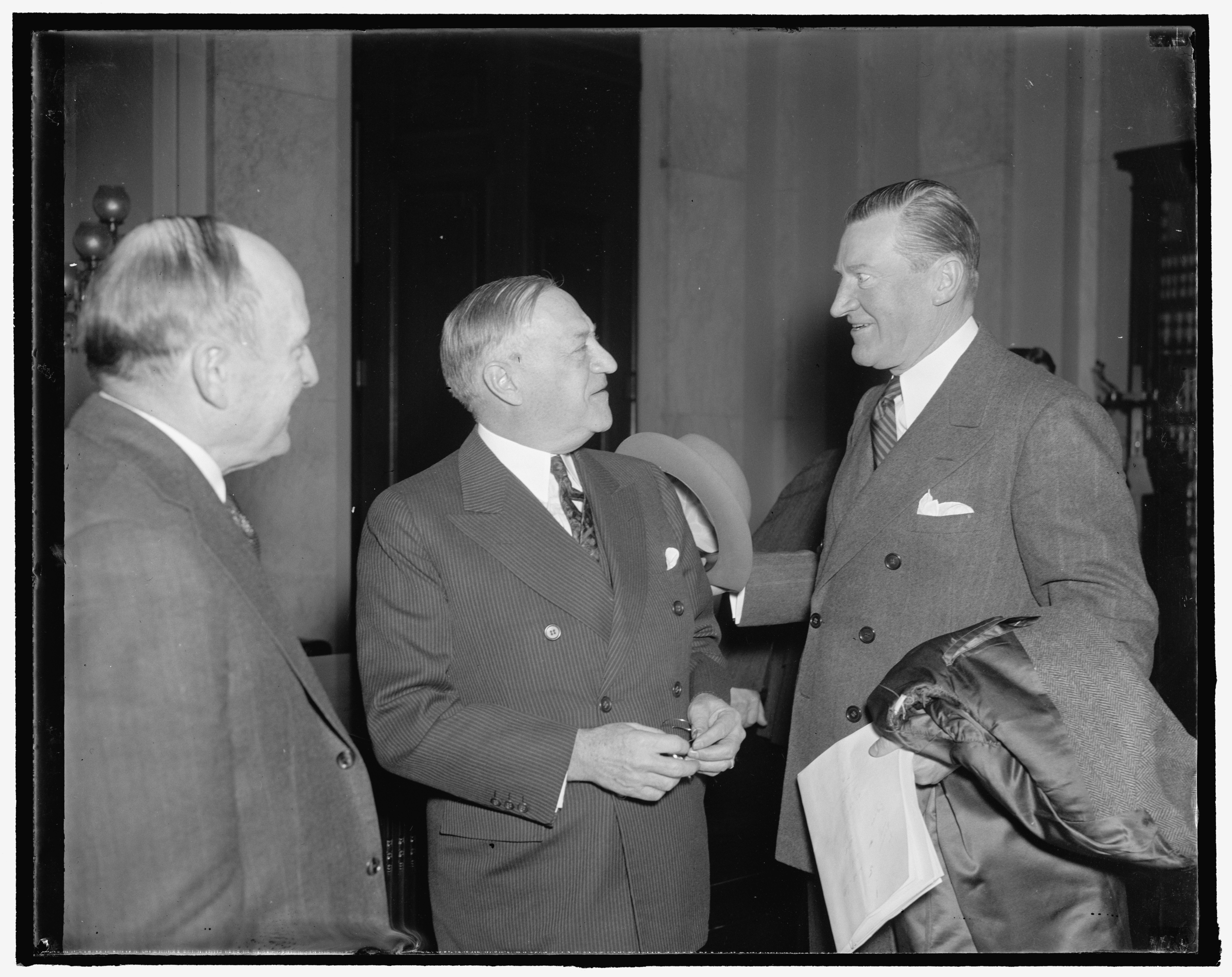
Federal Housing Administrator Stewart McDonald (right) discusses amendments to the Wagner Housing Act with its author, Senator Robert F. Wagner, December 1, 1937.

The act created the United States Housing Authority within the U.S. Department of the Interior. The act builds on the National Housing Act of 1934, which created the Federal Housing Administration. Both the 1934 Act and the 1937 Act were influenced by American housing reformers of the period, with Catherine Bauer Wurster chief among them. Bauer drafted much of this legislation and served as a Director in the United States Housing Authority, the agency created by the 1937 Act to control the payment of subsidies, for two years.

The sponsoring legislators were Representative Henry B. Steagall, Democrat of Alabama, and Senator Robert F. Wagner, Democrat of New York.

Although initially controversial, it gained acceptance and provisions of the Act have remained, but in amended form.

== Actions ==
The Housing Act of 1937 sought to eliminate what President Franklin Delano Roosevelt described as "habitations which not only fail to provide the physical benefits of modern civilization but breed disease and impair the health of future generations."

The act had been successfully lobbied for by the New York City tenants' City-Wide Tenants Council and other public housing advocates of the time.

The legislation outlined four goals: providing housing, renewing existing living areas, decreasing density and the construction of sustainable communities.

In order to deflect accusations of socialism and to protect private developers from competition, the act required the demolition of the same number of units of housing as would be built. Furthermore, it severely restricted the income of people who could reside in the new housing. It also limited the amount that could be spent to build the housing to $5000 per unit, which was very low even at that time. These construction projects were carried out by local housing authorities with the federal government providing the funding. Between 1939 and 1943, 160,000 units were constructed. Only 10,000 more units were constructed by 1948.

However a basis for receiving these subsidies was that the housing project was segregated by race.

== Outcomes ==
While the Housing Act of 1937 looked to solve American housing issues, it became marred by inequalities and problems. The main problem that rose from the legislation was the power given to the local governments. The Federal government let the local governments and voters decide on where and how to use the federal funding. This led to local governments maintaining segregationist housing policies as well as allowing many public housing locations to become neglected.

== Major amendments ==
The Housing Act of 1949, enacted during the Harry Truman administration set new postwar national goals for decent living environments; it also funded "slum clearance" and the urban renewal projects and created many national public housing programs. In 1965, the Public Housing Administration, the U.S. Housing Authority, and the House and Home Financing Agency were all swept into the newly formed and reorganized United States Department of Housing and Urban Development (HUD).

The Housing and Community Development Act of 1974 was a United States federal law, which, among other provisions, amended the Housing Act of 1937 to create Section 8 housing, authorized "Entitlement Communities Grants" to be awarded by HUD, and created the National Institute of Building Sciences.

In 1998, the Quality Housing and Work Responsibility Act (QHWRA) was passed by Congress and signed by President Bill Clinton. Following the frame of welfare reform, QHWRA developed new programs to transition families out of public housing, developed a home ownership model for Section 8, and expanded the HOPE VI program to replace traditional public housing units. The QHWRA combined Section 8's Existing Housing Certificate Program and Rental Voucher Program into the new Housing Choice Vouchers Program. The law specifies that at least 75% of a public housing agency's Housing Choice Vouchers be given to families making at or below 30% of the area median income. Lauch Faircloth sponsored an amendment that effectively capped the total number of public housing units, a rule that came to be known as the Faircloth Limit. This limited funding for the construction or operation of all units to the total number of units as of October 1, 1999. It requires public housing agencies to remove or consolidate existing units in order to receive funding for construction of any new units.

== See also ==
- Mobile Home Construction and Safety Standards Act of 1974
- Subsidized housing in the United States
- Urban renewal
