= Mutual Ownership Defense Housing Division =

US agency for government defense housing

The Mutual Ownership Defense Housing Division of the Federal Works Agency, an agency of the United States government, operating from about 1940 to 1942 under the leadership of Colonel Lawrence Westbrook, was an attempt by the United States Government, late in the New Deal, to respond to the housing needs facing defense workers and develop housing projects for middle-income families utilizing the cooperative/mutual housing ownership concept. Under pressure by entrenched real estate interests and intense and competing resource needs caused by World War II, the Division lasted for only two years. As stated in the Second Annual Report of the Federal Works Agency:

As a group, defense workers were also poor candidates for individual home ownership because the duration of their employment was uncertain, and because few of them had savings adequate to finance the downpayment on new homes. Recognizing these characteristics, attention was given early to some special form of housing to meet squarely the economic problem of the defense worker and one which, at the same time, might lead to an ultimate solution of the housing problems of millions of other American families of similar economic status.

Limited staffing resources within the Division also resulted in poor management practices, and a number of the projects were investigated for cost overruns and poor construction standards. Although only eight projects were ever built by the Division, all but one were eventually purchased from the government by their residents and continue to operate as mutual home corporations as of 2009. The Mutual Ownership Defense Housing Division projects can be considered a rare but important example of successful public housing within the United States.

During its very brief existence - from the autumn of 1940 to the winter of 1942 - the Mutual Ownership Defense Housing Division built the following eight projects.

Project	Location	Dwelling units	Development cost	Year purchased from government	Current status
Audubon Park	Audubon Park, New Jersey	500	$2,321,000	1947	Owned and maint. Audubon Mutual Housing Corp.
Avion Village	Grand Prairie, Texas	300	$920,000	1948	Owned and maint. Avion Village Housing Corp.
Bellmawr Park	Bellmawr, New Jersey	500	$2,321,000	1953	Owned and maint. Bellmawr Mutual Housing Corp.
Dallas Park	Dallas, Texas	300	$972,000	1948	Mutual ownership corp. dissolved
Pennypack Woods	Philadelphia, Pennsylvania	1,000	$4,367,000	1952	Owned and maint. Pennypack Woods Home Ownership Assoc.
Greenmont Village	Kettering, Ohio	500	$2,385,000	1947	Owned and maint. Greenmont Village Mutual Housing Corp.
Walnut Grove	South Bend, Indiana	250	$1,149,000	1947	Owned and maint. Walnut Grove Mutual Housing Corp.
Winfield Park	Winfield Township, New Jersey	700	$3,704,000	1950	Owned and maint. Winfield Park Mutual Housing Corp.

Additional Mutual Ownership Defense Housing projects were planned but never built in Alcoa, Tennessee (250 units); Long Beach, California (600 units); Beaumont, Texas (600 units); Buffalo, New York (1,050 units); Coatesville, Pennsylvania (400 units).

== Late New Deal public housing ==
By the middle of the 1930s the Franklin D. Roosevelt Administration began to bring attention to the housing plight of lower-income groups in the United States. Many of the New Deal administrators became convinced that decent housing was the right of every citizen, and believed it the duty of the government to find ways to provide such housing. A decentralized lower-income housing program was developed, which relied heavily on local community involvement, organization, and input. Financial and administrative support for this initiative were provided by the federal government. In support of this effort, a well-developed public relations campaign was begun to promote and explain the need for public housing, and to establish popular support for the program. Some administrators of the housing program were not satisfied with assisting only the lower-income groups. They asked why programs could not be expanded to assist the middle-income groups in finding decent, affordable housing. Able to afford higher rents, yet often unable to accumulate the required down payments for ownership, members of the middle-income group found it very difficult, if not impossible, to make the jump from renting a house to owning it. Affordable housing plans were developed but were unable to garner the necessary support within government circles, and they were filed away to await a time when the environment would be right for implementation. Surprisingly, the wait was not long. Just prior to direct American involvement in World War II, the nation entered an emergency period of military buildup that required the development of housing for the middle-income defense workers then streaming into defense plants across the country. The nation's entire public housing program needed to adjust quickly to the needs of the middle-income worker, and the proposals for housing programs—filed away just a few years earlier—were dusted off. During this relatively brief period of time (1940–1941) just prior to the outbreak of war and its accompanying material shortages and limitations, housing officials had a great deal of freedom to implement these experimental middle-income housing plans.

The Housing Act of 1937 directed that initial motivation, maintenance, and partial funding of the housing program originate as the local level. The federal government would now provide loans and subsidy assistance to local public housing agencies for the construction and operation of projects for "families whose incomes are so low that they cannot afford adequate housing provided by private enterprise." Those involved actively with public housing were generally pleased with this readjustment in operations. One federal publication stated that ".. we must remember that in 1931, Government housing was only a dream of progressives. Today it is a fact and there is strong reason to believe that, in the near future, it will be recognized as a permanent necessity ..." The United States Housing Authority (USHA) was soon established to facilitate the implementation of the Housing Act of 1937. The USHA was charged with the responsibility for the development and administration of all federal public housing programs. One of the Authority's first efforts was the implementation of a public relations campaign to establish popular support for the housing program that would help blunt attacks from the construction industry and other enemies. Public Housing was a highly polished monthly publication distributed as part of this public relations campaign. This publication not only discussed the benefits and justifications of public housing programs, but charted progress on a national scale. Many other government agency publications also took a very protective and supportive—some might say radical—tone concerning the newly established United States Housing Authority and its mission:

A clear-cut opposition (to public housing) has been formed of which the spearhead is the Realtor. He sees in this work an invasion of the field of private initiative and contends that Government housing projects subject him to unfair and ruinous competition ... Every attempt is being made to restrict competition with private enterprise to that restricted field where operators exploit the misery of the underprivileged. Here the competition is deliberate and amply justified.

Many public housing officials in the Roosevelt Administration were progressives, and had strong convictions about the right of all citizens to inexpensive, quality housing. The provision of decent housing seemed to many of these officials to be a key to the preservation of democracy during the dark days of the Depression. Housing was simply too important a concern to be left only to private industry, labor, or even individual citizens; they believed it was the responsibility of the government to take the lead. Sentiments such as these quickly led to the consideration of public housing programs for those other than just the low-income groups. But the government creation of middle-income housing projects was viewed by many members of the nation's building and real estate industry to be a much larger threat to their livelihood than that designed for the lower-income group. Although pressure from these groups did not stop the development of innovative middle-income housing programs, it did stop those programs from being implemented during the 1930s.

In 1939, the Federal Works Agency (FWA) was established with the aim of consolidating all government public works programs, including those for public housing, into one agency. This new agency became responsible for the United States Housing Authority(USHA), its planning and operations; under a great deal of pressure, the FWA promptly filed away the newly developed plans for middle-income housing initiatives. However, few of those involved in the design process forgot about these innovative ideas, and hoped that one day they would be reconsidered.

== Defense housing programs ==
The 1940s began in a state of global crisis as the European and Asian Wars began rapidly expanding into what would eventually be known as World War II. The United States, although officially neutral, was busily taking defensive measures to ensure national security, while also attempting to assist friendly nations already in the midst of the fighting through measures such as the Lend-Lease program with Great Britain. The corresponding expansion of defense industries, especially those located along coastal areas, and the massive migration of workers into these booming regions, created a serious housing shortage that demanded immediate government intervention. On June 20, 1940, the Congress passed the National Defense Bill. Shortly thereafter, on June 28, the 1937 United States Housing Act was amended, instructing the USHA to waive income requirements for potential public housing residents, and to apply all remaining monies from low-income housing projects into efforts to house defense workers. Additionally, monies were made available for defense housing through the President's Emergency Defense Fund. In July 1940, President Roosevelt created the position of the Defense Housing Coordinator to oversee the new defense housing effort. Out of political necessity this position possessed only limited authority, and the Coordinator was instructed by the Presidential directive to fit the defense housing program into the decentralized public housing program already in existence since the 1930s. Real authority for the Defense Housing effort would remain vested in the FWA and its administrator, John Carmody (This administrative structure would last only until early 1942, when wartime limitations not only permitted but necessitated far greater centralization.)

The establishment of the defense housing program accelerated quickly after the passage of National Housing for Defense Act of 1940 (also known as the Lanham Act) by Congress on October 14, 1940, which provided $140,000,000 for defense housing construction. The Lanham Act specified that, "The housing is to be wherever feasible of a permanent nature, and after the emergency has passed these homes are to be disposed of, and in that way the Government is to recoup the initial investment ... and they will be available for permanent homes." The cost per unit was set at, and not permitted to exceed, $3000. By its very nature, defense housing was primarily constructed for the middle-income employees of the defense industry. The Act also empowered the Federal Works Agency (FWA) to overrule local governmental resistance and regulations in order to expedite construction. Additionally, it ensured that the host communities of defense housing projects would receive payments from the federal government, in lieu of taxes "equivalent to full ad valorem tax, less the cost of any municipal services provided by the project". During the war years the Lanham Act was regularly amended by Congress in order to provide additional funds for housing and to adjust various aspects of the Act, especially its impact on local communities. By 1945, almost 9,000,000 individuals had been provided with housing. Total costs approached $7.5 billion ($5.2 billion private financing and $2.3 billion public financing), with the average unit costing $4,566.00.

The Federal Works Agency, as the principal governmental agency responsible for construction, maintenance and disposal of defense housing constructed prior to 1942, established three goals for its efforts:

1. To provide housing to defense workers as quickly as was possible.
2. To provide housing to defense workers as inexpensively as possible, "in accordance with the permanent or temporary character of the need and prospective uses of the facilities."
3. To provide to employees housing of a quality and standard that "benefits the defense personnel for whom the housing is constructed, and for the purpose of realizing the maximum permanent public benefit to be derived from the new housing."

The concept behind mutual home ownership was developed in the late 1930s and filed away by the FWA as were other middle income housing plans. But the emergency guidelines and policies outlined by the Lanham Act, the goals of the FWA, the availability of necessary resources, and the decentralized administrative structure for the development of public housing all contributed to an ideal environment for experimentation in public middle-income housing. The mutual housing concept was taken off the shelf, to be tried as an experimental community. An entirely new office was established by FWA in support of this effort. Headed by Colonel Lawrence Westbrook, this office was known as the Mutual Ownership Defense Housing Division.

== Mutual home ownership concept ==
One of the United States government's plans for middle-class housing was the Mutual Ownership Defense Housing Division of the Federal Works Agency (also sometimes referred to as the "Camden Plan" in honor of the city closest to the first project at Audubon, New Jersey). From the conception of the Division; through the development of its eight projects;, and to its demise at the hands of inept management, wartime limitations and shortages, and attacks from powerful enemies was only a short few years. By the conclusion of the Second World War, the Mutual Ownership Defense Housing Division was all but forgotten. The Division's eight projects were presented by critics as unworkable and highly unattractive projects in the economic and political environment of the post-war period. But almost seventy years later, all but one (Dallas Park) of these projects is reported as continuing to operate as highly successful mutual housing corporations. The passage by the United States Congress of the Housing Act of 1937 can be thought of as a reaction to criticisms of earlier New Deal low-income housing programs operated through the office of the Federal Emergency Administrator of Public Works. Many officials were concerned about the over-centralization and disregard for local involvement and control in these early experimental programs.

The Mutual Ownership Defense Housing Program, as designed by Westbrook and his team, called for government construction of houses or apartments to be occupied—and eventually owned—by middle-income defense workers. A key to the plan was the commitment made by the federal government to sell the projects, at the conclusion of the emergency period, to a non-profit Mutual Housing Corporation made up of the projects' residents. This cooperative, non-profit corporation would be initially supported and advised by the government and later turned over completely to the members. This corporation would be responsible for amortizing the government backed mortgage over a 45-year period through monthly payments that included a 3% interest charge on the unpaid balance. Each of the project's residents would be a member of the corporation, and receive a contract from the corporation entitling him/her to perpetual use of his/her unit and one share of stock in the corporation. The monthly payment made by each member to the corporation would include individual amortization payments based on a 30-year rate, as well as set costs for maintenance, taxes, insurance, major repairs, etc. Each share was interchangeable among residents, thus allowing families to easily exchange different size units as family sizes and needs changed over the years.

As an added bonus, each member would build ownership equity within the corporation,

since, during the amortization period, the tenant is paying off his share of the mortgage in 30 years, rather than the 45 years allowed the corporation, he is in effect enabling the corporation to make prepayments on the principal owed to the Government. In this way he builds up an equity, or cash value, equal to the original value of the house, less depreciation and less the amount of principal still unpaid. Should he wish to withdraw from the project the equity is returnable to him in cash. Moreover, if for hardship reasons such as unemployment or illness he is unable to meet his monthly payments, the equity can be drawn upon to tide him over.

This equity could also be available to the corporation as an emergency fund.

In a mutual home ownership corporation, rents are kept low by creating an economy of scale. There are also savings for mass-construction, improved land use, centralized facilities, operating economies, and maintaining a non-profit status. Costs can also be contained—although controversially—by the federal government providing all necessary public works (i.e. sewers, streets, curbs, sidewalks) through the Works Progress Administration (WPA). According to Colonel Lawrence Westbrook, membership in the community should be based on a process in which individuals of predominantly similar income groups from a cross-section of area occupations, and from different age groups, are selected. These demographics made the community less vulnerable to economic crisis, while the differing family sizes and space needs allowed for flexibility in housing requirements. Plans called for the final selling price of the Mutual Housing project to be set through negotiations between two separate appraisers—one representing the federal government and the other representing the Corporation—and title would be transferred at the 20% amortization point.

== Advantages of the Mutual Housing plan ==
Testifying before Congress in the summer of 1941, Colonel Westbrook outlined the following advantages that he believed would result from the implementation of the Mutual Housing program:

Advantages for Workers

1. Permits the building of substantial financial reserves for bad times through the elimination of down payments and high rents for housing.
2. Allows interchangeability of housing units to account for changing family conditions.
3. Enables a family to maintain a substantial investment in a "facility in which it will always have a personal need."
4. Prevents individual foreclosures through cooperative risk sharing.
5. Group maintenance and repair is possible and can be accomplished at less cost while also maintaining a uniform community appearance.
6. During times of financial stress the program will permit large-scale refinancing and a more effective means for investment protection.

Advantages for the Government

1. Affords a better protection for the Government's investment by reason of the occupants' direct concern and interest in their homes.
2. Eliminates a sudden flood of housing in the real estate market at the conclusion of the emergency, because "occupants in the Mutual Housing program will have been selected on the basis of their probable permanence, high credit ratings."
3. Improves the chance of recouping original investment by permitting the purchase of the project by its residents.
4. Creates a stable and responsible community with lower defense worker turn-over.
5. Creates a new and valuable pattern for home building.

Advantages for the Host Community

1. Acquires a group of carefully selected stable new citizens.
2. "Full participation of the residents of the project in community affairs and in the sharing of the community expenses."

== Supporters ==
Among the first groups to support (and continue to support) the plans of the Mutual Ownership Defense Housing Division was the Industrial Union of Marine and Shipbuilding Workers of America, a member union of the Congress of Industrial Organizations (CIO). Representatives from the Kearny, New Jersey, Local spoke before Congress in support of initiatives put in place by the Lanham Act, while representatives of the Camden, New Jersey, Local were among the first to benefit from the mutual housing program itself, with the construction of Audubon Park, built just outside Camden. For many years the entire program itself was better known as the Camden Plan. In a Congressional hearing during March 1941, a union representative stated that:

In the opinion of the overwhelming majority of the workers, who will live in the homes, the (Mutual Ownership) plan, with a few minor changes, is absolutely foolproof and can assure the United States Government a full return on its investment ... and could ... provide good living space in a good established locality, where you can have an investment in the locality, not down in some slum-clearance district, homes where people can live for many years.

Another representative stated in a July 1941, hearing that:

Study of this project by the CIO housing committee has confirmed our view that it (mutual housing program) points the way toward a proper answer to the problem of housing permanent workers in established industrial communities.

and

This plan is the best and most efficient type of public housing) with the most satisfactory relationships with the occupant workers, and the least ultimate expense to the Government.

The National Committee on the Housing Emergency, a private group set up to examine all potential solutions to the defense housing problem, were also strong supporters of the mutual housing program and wrote the following in their final report to Congress:

After study of the details of a plan of mutual home ownership this committee believes that such a plan includes many advantageous features in the planning, financing and construction of houses for defense workers ... So that further experimentation in this direction may be undertaken, this committee urges that funds be made available for defense housing under future appropriations by the Congress be used in part to further such experimentations.

Another very important and powerful supporter of mutual housing was Senator Lanham himself, who stated the following during a March 1941 hearing before Congress:

My understanding of the original (Lanham Act) was that it was not the purpose to make (homes) ideal, but it was the purpose to build them in areas where they could be used permanently and of a standard that would be suitable for permanent residence, because in that way the Government has the best chance of recouping its investment by the sale of the homes, and, of course, this (mutual ownership plan) is different in that respect from many of these housing projects, because these are built from the standpoint of sale and recouping the expenditure insofar as possible, at the same time affording an opportunity to these industrial workers to get a home where they are permanently engaged.

== Critics ==
Of course, not everyone was supportive of the mutual housing concept, and many of these critics were especially powerful and influential individuals. First among these critics was Charles Palmer, the federal government's Defense Housing Coordinator. Palmer was frustrated by his lack of control over the highly decentralized defense housing effort, and from his perspective certain housing programs were wasteful, ineffective and unproductive. This was especially true of experimental housing programs like the mutual housing program. Although not directly able to stop the program, Palmer was in a position to hamper the program's progress. Palmer went so far as to declare the program itself to be illegal—although never specifying how it was so—and made himself readily accessible and helpful to organizations protesting the siting of mutual housing projects within their communities.

Evidence supporting Palmer's contention of wastefulness is readily available. Unfortunately, Colonel Westbrook did not possess many of the organizational or management skills necessary to successfully and efficiently supervise his division. On two separate occasions the mutual housing program's projects and efforts were brought before the scrutiny of the Truman Committee investigating waste and corruption in the National Defense Program. Contractors for mutual housing projects in New Jersey did particularly poor jobs and completed the projects substantially over budget. Bids were also badly mishandled by the Mutual Ownership Division. Senator Truman himself became so disgusted by the management of the mutual housing program that in answer to a witness' statement that he did not know exactly what the Mutual Ownership Division did, Truman was recorded as saying that, "They (Mutual Ownership Division) don't either, so proceed."

Other significant contentions expressed by the critics of the program included the following:

1. Temporary short term housing should be destroyed at the end of the emergency period. This was viewed as far more appropriate than attempting to plan for the long term in the midst of a crisis. Senator Kilburn stated that, "It is my contention that they (defense workers) are taking advantage of the situation to feather their own nests."
2. The defense housing problem could more efficiently be handled through the private market. The mutual housing program just competes with, and hurts the private developers. Senator Bell asked: "I am just wondering ... if people earning between $160 and $200 a month or less regularly and are permanently employed, (could have their housing needs) handled through channels of private industry? Aren't there plenty of builders and finance available for construction of homes of that character?" The New Jersey Realtors' Board President wrote an editorial published in local newspapers stating, " ..The USHA no longer can attempt to justify subsidized, socialized housing ... with defense activity providing new employment at good wages, and financiers alert to the rising home market, there can be no justification for another such (mutual housing) project in New Jersey."
3. The residents of a mutual ownership project will simply leave the project at the end of the emergency, taking their equity with them, and selling the whole project to speculators. Senator Kirman asked a resident of one of the projects "... don't you think you will take the whole thing and hock it off to the highest bidder? Every one of the emergencies in the past shows that this has been done."
4. The mutual housing program is good for city dwellers, but provides no solution for the severe housing needs of rural farmers who were also working for the defense program, but often living in squalid surroundings.
5. The federal government should not have to assume the risk for housing its citizens. According to Senator Johnson, "The thing that alarms me is the philosophy which the entire country seems to be adopting, that if the risk is not good, let the government take it. That is nothing more than a refinement of the old thought that the world owes you a living."
6. There are many hidden costs in a mutual housing project - especially related to the public works being provided by the Federal Works Administration (FWA) - which make each unit far more expensive than indicated, and far in excess of the maximum allowable dollar amount specified by the Lanham Act. Senator Shelton stated that, "..if you put in a public housing job by Lanham funds, and you ask the cost of it, and it comes to $3200 a unit, the public housing sponsors do not count in the FWA that did the excavations and the landscaping and we do not count the sewers that are $8 a running foot, and if it was all counted in and it was properly appraised and capitalized, the structure would cost $5000 ..."

By far the most persistent critics of the mutual housing program—and many other defense housing programs—were residents of the host communities where the projects were being built, or being planned. The residents feared additional financial burdens to be imposed on them for expanding public facilities. They were also very concerned about the quality and background of the new people moving into their community. Congress began reacting to the financial fears of potential defense housing host communities early in 1941 by passing an amendment to the Lanham Act that provided additional resources for the expansion of public facilities (i.e. schools, government offices, libraries, feeder roads, sewers, etc.) in these communities. Congress also anticipated the fears and concerns host communities would have about defense housing projects and empowered the FWA to overrule local resistance and regulations in order to expedite the provision of defense housing. Residents of host communities would continue to be fearful that their new neighbors would be a lower class of people (no matter how similar to themselves they actually may have been), while also feeling resentful that others seemed to be getting a tax supported subsidy for housing when they themselves had worked "long and hard" to obtain their homes.

== Demise of the Mutual Ownership Defense Housing Division ==
There were a number of pressures, factors, and individuals that contributed to the early end of the Mutual Ownership Defense Housing Division.

On November 30, 1941, just eight days prior to the Japanese bombing of Pearl Harbor and the start of direct United States involvement in the Second World War, tenants of the last mutual ownership project (Winfield Park, New Jersey) began to move into their new homes. The outbreak of war ignited the smoldering debate over permanent vs. temporary housing for the defense workers. Early shortages of materials, equipment, and manpower for construction, along with the early retreat of allied forces on all fronts, added support to the argument that emergency housing should be only of temporary nature, and not built in support of long-term postwar goals. The construction of temporary housing quickly became the program's emphasis. But the mutual housing program was based on long-term financial planning for the construction of permanent housing, and could not function with this new temporary construction emphasis. Support for centralizing the defense housing effort was also increasing, and resulted in the February 24, 1942 establishment of the National Housing Agency by Executive Order of the President. Those individuals sympathetic to centralization were not very supportive of experimental housing programs. Even prior to the formal outbreak of war, the entire defense housing program, under pressure from Congressional conservatives and industry officials, began to make a significant switch to private sector initiatives to get the defense housing job done. Supporters of this new direction strongly believed that private industry was far more efficient, and ".. could utilize a few lots here and a favorably located site there, wholly unsuitable for large-scale Government projects." Congressional support of the private construction industry came in the legislative form of Title IV of the Lanham Act, passed in the spring of 1941. This legislation provided 100% financing for speculative builders of housing for workers in defense areas. Obviously Title IV was meant to serve the same housing market as the mutual housing program. Evidence also suggests that the staff of the NHA was far more conservative than had been the staff of the FWA. This swing to the right was completed when 700 members of the consolidated staff were laid off; many of those leaving were among the most progressive, and many programs, including the mutual housing program, were officially ended. This newly consolidated agency moved quickly to develop programs that were especially supportive of private initiative programs for solving the defense housing need, and generally supportive of Title IV. Colonel Lawrence Westbrook noted in 1945 testimony that the NHA had destroyed the mutual housing program even at a time when requests for expansion of the program were pouring in from across the nation. Although news of the mutual housing concept had spread quickly through the labor union network, and many committees had been organized by workers to aid the implementation of the plan locally, all committees had to be told that the program was experimental in nature and no more staff could be made available to work with them.

During its short period of existence neither financial nor personnel resources were provided at the necessary levels to effectively support and operate the Mutual Ownership Defense Housing Division. The eight projects undertaken were far more than the Division could handle with its limited resources. Claims and investigations of mismanagement of the Division were partially related to Westbrook's weak supervisory abilities, but they were also due to oversights and mistakes made by a small, overworked staff trying to do more than it could efficiently do, in an unsupportive environment. In addition, problems at many of the projects—especially those in New Jersey—provided a lot of ammunition to critics of the mutual housing effort. Once publicized, these difficulties generated a large political and public backlash against the project. On November 30, 1942, Life Magazine provided its readers with a photographic exposé on the Truman Committee's investigation of the Winfield Park Project, which reported:

These hearings are to establish and fix responsibility for the outrageously inept planning, construction and supervision of the 700-home project financed by the Government to house war workers from nearby Kearny, N.J. shipyards.

The very nature and concept of the mutual housing program was threatening to other government housing officials because it would result in a further division of limited resources, and because it called for the ultimate disposal of projects through direct purchase by its residents; although this was a very innovative concept in the United States, it would result in the reduction in the number of these same government managers and administers. The mutual housing concept was also not easily understood, contributing to the lack of support or remorse at the prospect of the demise of the program. An illustration is the October 29, 1941 Congressional testimony of Nathan Strauss, Administrator of the United States Housing Authority (the Authority had essentially been put out of business by the June 1940 defense housing amendment to the 1937 Housing Act):

Next, the Federal Works Agency, no doubt pressed hard by other eager outstretched hands, sought still additional methods of getting defense housing done. Some money was made available to the Farm Security Administration, to the Tennessee Valley Authority, and within the FWA itself another unit was set up, the Mutual Ownership Division of Defense Housing, under Col. Westbrook. I don't know exactly what they do, sir.

But then he became very critical of Title IV of the Lanham Act. He stated that he viewed Title IV as a:

... device evolved by the Defense Housing Coordinator to utilize the desperate need of defense workers for shelter in order to force them into the purchase of a home ... The result of the enactment of this bill would be to give away millions of public funds to speculative builders to enable them to sell homes on the installment plan to workers whose probable inability to meet the installments is the very justification urged for enactment of the bill.

Either Strauss knew as little as he indicated about the mutual housing program, or he was deliberately obfuscating, since a successful and growing mutual home ownership program would have pushed housing programs in a completely different direction from those already under way at the USHA.

There was also a great deal of discussion about the legality of the mutual housing program. This discussion was sparked by Charles Palmer, the Defense Housing Coordinator, during 1941, although there was never any clear statement of an actual legal problem related to the mutual housing program. On a number of occasions the Legal Counsel of the FWA and Westbrook were asked to defend the legality of the program. They announced that they could not find any violation of the law. But the question itself, posed by the Defense Housing Coordinator, created a number of doubts among influential individuals who could have protected and encouraged the program, rather than watch it be dismantled.

Taken together, these issues, concerns, falsehoods and speculations would have injured even a strong and stable program, but in this case completely undermined an innovative experimental program. It is actually surprising that the mutual housing program survived as long as it did. In 1942, the Council for Industrial Organizations (CIO) expressed its concern at the ending of mutual housing effort, and at the small percentage of permanent housing being built as part of the Defense Program. In March 1942, a CIO representative presented to Congress a copy of his organization's resolution on war workers' housing in the United States, that included the following demand:

We demand not only that there be a return to a sane program of building planned housing communities, but insist further that war workers as tenants, through the labor organizations which represent them, be given an opportunity to participate in planning the layout and construction of such communities and in their cooperative management after construction, and renew our endorsement of the Mutual Home Ownership Plan...

These protests were ignored by Congress, and the mutual housing program never revived.

== Mutual housing projects after the Second World War ==
By the conclusion of World War II, the eight completed mutual housing projects built in 1941 were doing exceedingly well, though federal, state and local governmental support had been and continued to be severely lacking. A number of these projects were reported to be the lowest-costing permanently constructed housing projects ever built by the federal government. Some reports indicated that the cost of development and management of the mutual housing projects had been approximately 50% of the cost for comparably sized regular public housing projects. According to mutual housing supports, the vested interest of corporation members inspired demands for efficient low cost operations. As one resident of Greenmont Village Mutual Housing Corporation stated:

When everybody owns an equal share of his community and knows that if his neighbor does not do his share, that the village as a whole and, in particular, his own equity will lose in valuation, each owner is interested to see that all people in the community do their share and will also help to educate those who are not true cooperators.

Clearly this type of involvement and concern by residents had a stabilizing effect on the communities, and the increased involvement of residents encouraged greater efficiency. Reports from residents indicate that individuals had actually turned down other employment opportunities because they did not wish to leave the cooperative, neighborly, low-cost environment of their mutual housing project.

The Congress of Industrial Organizations (CIO) was so impressed by the mutual housing program, and so frustrated by the inaction of the federal government in expanding it, that it obtained private financing to build a second mutual housing project next to Greenmont Village in Ohio. This new project differed considerably from the original mutual housing concept however. Residents of this new project owned their own homes, forcing the project into the speculative housing market. The CIO believed that residents would not be inclined to sell out of the project because of the many advantages and benefits of being a member of a mutual housing corporation.

Although only positive reports were coming from the mutual housing projects already in existence, the Housing Act of 1945 made only vague mention of the mutual housing concept. The Act provided only limited resources to promote the program as a private initiative model for groups of returning veterans seeking housing. The National Housing Agency informed Congress that research on the program would continue, and that:

Records on the projects are being maintained for future analysis and study. They will be available for the guidance of groups interest in this approach to the low-cost housing market and to private capital and developers seeking to broaden the scope of private industry in the field of the so-called 'middle market' in housing.

Only one thin publication on how to create a privately financed mutual housing corporation was ever published by the National Housing Agency. This publication stated that:

The Federal Public Housing Authority (FPHA) is in the process of disposing of a number of housing projects constructed during the war. The Authority will sell these properties to mutual ownership corporations formed by present and prospective occupants of the specific projects, provided these groups meet the requirements of FPHA (2/3 occupancy at the time of Corporation purchase). Among prospective occupants, veterans are given first preference.

Residents of a number of projects, most located in the midwest and working with the CIO, established a National Mutual Housing Association during the mid-1940s. Colonel Westbrook was a member of the advisory board. This association promoted what it believed was the housing solution of the future, whose time had come. The Chairman of the Association made the following report to Congress:

... I think it is the most thrilling story of housing that you have heard or will hear, and the only hopeful story that you have heard. We contend that this is the first showing of a hopeful effort, under Government auspices, to solve the housing problem, the first plan to be tried and tested which offers to you any solution of the housing problem. Therefore, we want someone to administer it with faith in it and with faith in the people.

The goals of the Association included the creation of a Mutual Housing Agency in the National Housing Authority to promote the program and at the same time dispose of all war housing projects as mutual housing projects. It also wanted to open the mutual housing program to all citizens regardless of "social, racial, or economic status." Supporters realized that without the government resources or support of this type there could be little hope of the mutual housing program becoming a national program. Once again, however, the concept that public housing was only for the low-income populations had taken hold, and also the concept that only through private initiative and financing, with substantial government support, could the United States provide appropriate middle-income housing.

The Red Scare of the immediate postwar years also created a negative environment for programs with even the slightest socialistic overtones, which was true for the mutual housing program. The CIO itself, with the creation of its own mutual housing program in which each resident owned his/her own unit, clearly illustrated that the popular housing sentiment of the time was to own your own home. The resulting lack of mutually maintained equity, and the ability of residents to independently sell out of the project, created a speculative market environment that ran counter to the principles that held the mutual housing program together. Additionally, the desire for home ownership and the increasing affordability of middle-income housing, thanks to extensive government subsidies both in the mortgage market and through tax policy following the second world war, ensured that the mutual housing concept was shelved once again.

Both John Carmody (FWA Administrator) and Colonel Lawrence Westbrook continued to be devoted to the mutual housing concept and discussed the final disposal of the eight projects in keeping with the original mutual housing plan. As late as 1952 Westbrook was looking for ways to resurrect this middle-class public housing effort but this plan was abandoned with the election of the Republican administration of Dwight D. Eisenhower.

== See also ==
- Aluminum City Terrace

== Sources ==
- "500 House Experiment at Camden, NJ: FWA Defense Housing Project Tries Mutual Ownership Plan, as Well as Partial Prefabrication." American Builder. 63 (1941).
- "A Road to Home Ownership: Remarks of Jerry Voorhis of California in the House of Representatives." Congressional Record. October 4, 1945.
- "A Unique Method of 'Owning' Their Homes: Living in Audubon Park." The Philadelphia Inquirer. March 22, 1998.
- "An Urban Village Built on Cooperation: Some Have Questioned the Co-Op's Family Preference and Admissions Criteria. Two Suits - One was Settled, Another Thrown Out - Contended That They Had the Effect of Excluding Blacks." The Philadelphia Inquirer. September 17, 1987.
- "Building for Defense ... Government Housers Meet Each Week to Study Program Progress, Dodge Bullets and Bouquets from Boss Carmody Who Last Month Pulled in Young Blood to Speed the Work Via Private Architects, Prefabrication and Good Weather." The Architectural Forum. July 1941. pp. 8–9.
- "Building for Defense ... Government Housing in a Hurray For 500 Shipyard Works. FWA Encloses 20 Houses a Day with the Aid of Prefabrication, Gives AFL 56 Units to Hammer and Saw. A Close-Up of the Biggest House Factory (Audubon Park)" The Architectural Forum, May 1941. pp. 341–343.
- Carmody, John M. " 'Village Improves National Morale,' Says Carmody. More Needed, He Declares. Project Symbol of What Nation Can Do, He Points Out." Special Edition Courier Post. Camden, New Jersey. Saturday, December 16, 1941. p. 5.
- "Cooperative Mutual Housing." Speech by John. R. Lutes, Secretary of the Walnut Grove Mutual Housing Corporation, South Bend, Indiana before the National Cooperative League Congress at Columbus, Ohio. September 9, 1946.
- Danenberg, Elsie, "Get Your Home The Co-Operative Way", Greenberg, New York, 1949.
- "Defense Housing: An Exchange of Correspondence between Defense Housing Coordinator Palmer, FWA Administrator Carmody and The Forum's Editor." The Architectural Forum. March 1941. pp. 30, 54–58.
- "Development of a Park Site: Rahway River Park Housing Project, Rahway, New Jersey, John T. Rowland, Architect (Winfield Park)." Architectural Record, Volume 90, Number 5, November 1941, pp. 86–87
- Distributor (Publication of the United Auto Workers), March 15, 1942. "War Housing: The Mutual Home Ownership Plan Which Means Real Homes For War Workers Planned and Built According to Democratic Principles."
- Federal Emergency Administration of Public Works. "Urban Housing: The Story of the P.W.A. Housing Division 1933-1936, Bulletin No. 2." Washington, D.C.: GPO, August 1936.
- "Federal Housing for North American Workers (Dallas Park)." The Architectural Forum. July 1941. p. 5.
- Federal Works Agency. (United States Housing Authority). "Four Years of Public Housing." Washington, D.C.: GPO, 1941.
- Federal Works Agency. "1st Annual Report." Washington, D.C.: GPO, 1940.
- Federal Works Agency. "2nd Annual Report." Washington, D.C.: GPO, 1941.
- Federal Works Agency. "3rd Annual Report." Washington, D.C.: GPO, 1942.
- Federal Works Agency. Press Release #83. "Explanation of the Proposed 'Camden Plan': Text of Remarks by Lawrence Westbrook, Special Assistant to the Federal Works Administrator, for the Easter States Institute of Public Housing, March 22, 1941, Philadelphia, Pennsylvania." Federal Works Agency Information Division, March 21, 1941.
- Federal Works Agency. Publication #7530. "Suggested General Principles Governing Execution and Operation of Mutual Home Ownership Projects." Revised October 17, 1941.
- Federal Works Agency. Publication #9149. "Mutual Ownership Defense Housing."
- Hines, Thomas. Richard Neutra and the Search for Modern Architecture. Oxford University Press, 1982. (Avion Village pp. 175–180, 194; illustrations pp. 180–180. Lawrence Westbrook pp. 174–175, 178–179.
- Home Ownership at Audubon Park. Prepared for the Residents of Audubon Park, NJ by the Board of Trustees Audubon Mutual Housing Corporation. 1954.
- House of Representatives Hearings on House Resolution 3213, (A Bill to Expedite Further the Provision of Housing in Connection With National Defense, and to Provide Public Works in Relation to such Housing and other National Defense Activities, and For Other Purposes) and House Resolution 3570, (A Bill Authorizing An Appropriation for Providing Additional Community Facilities Made Necessary By National Defense Activities and For Other Purposes). "Hearings Before the Committee On Public Buildings and Grounds, March 4,5,6,7,12 and 13, 1941." Washington, D.C.: GPO, 1941.
- House of Representatives Hearings on House Resolution 3486, (A Bill to Authorize An Appropriation of An Additional $150,000,000 for Defense Housing). "Hearings Before the Committee On Public Buildings and Grounds, February 21, 1941." Washington, D.C.: GPO, 1941.
- House of Representatives Hearings on House Resolution 5211, (A Bill to Authorize An Appropriation of An Additional $300,000,000 For Defense Housing). "Hearings Before the Committee On Public Buildings and Grounds, July 9,10,11,15,16,17,18,22,23,1941." Washington, D.C.: GPO, 1941.
- House of Representatives Hearings on House Resolution 7312, (A Bill to Increase by $600,000,000 The Amount Authorized To Be Appropriated For Defense Housing Under the Act of October 14, 1940, As Amended). "Hearings Before the Committee on Public Buildings and Grounds, June 9,10,11,12,16,17,18,19,23,24,25 and 26, 1942." Washington, D.C.: GPO, 1942.
- House of Representatives Hearings on House Resolutions 6482 and 6483, (Bills to Amend the Act Entitled 'An Act To Expedite the Provision of Housing In Connection with National Defense and For Other Purposes'). "Hearings Before the Committee on Public Buildings and Grounds, January 29 and 30, February 3, 1942, March 11,12,17,18,19 and 24, 1942." Washington, D.C." GPO, 1942.
- House of Representatives Hearings on Message from the President of the United States, (A Draft of a Proposed Bill to Increase by $400,000,000 the Amount Authorized to be Appropriated for Defense Housing). "Hearings Before the Committee on Public Buildings and Grounds, May 18,19,20,21,26 and 27, June 1,2,4,8, and 10, 1943." Washington, D.C.: GPO, 1943.
- "House Types, One and Two Story, One and Two Bedrooms. Defense Houses at Grand Prairie, Texas. Roscoe P. De Witt, Architect, David R. Williams, Richard J. Neutra, Consulting Architects." The Architectural Forum, October 1941. pp. 240–242.
- "Housing for Defense-And After: Vast Opportunity as Well as a Whole Host of Baffling Problems Lie in the Task of Adequately Sheltering Our Army of Workers." New York Times. September 21, 1941.
- "Housing Lag Seen Slowing Defense: Flynn of CIO Says Key Men Refuse Overtime Owing to Long Journeys to Homes." New York Times. January 26, 1941. p. 1.
- "Housing Project, Bellmawr, NJ: Mayer & Whittlesey and Joseph N Hettel Associated Architects." The Architectural Forum. January 1943.
- Life Magazine, "Truman Committee Exposes Housing Mess," November 29, 1942.
- "Mutual Housing: Extension of Remarks of Hon. Robert F. Wagner of New York in the Senate of the United States." Congressional Record. Monday, July 9, 1945.
- National Housing Agency (Federal Public Housing Authority). "Public Housing: The Work of the Federal Public Housing Authority." Washington, D.C.: GPO, March 1946.
- National Housing Agency. "Housing for War and the Job Ahead: A Common Goal for Communities ... for Industry, Labor and Government." Washington, D.C.: GPO, April 1944.
- National Housing Agency. "Housing Practices - War and Prewar: Review of Design and Construction, National Housing Bulletin 5." Washington, D.C.: GPO, May 1946.
- National Housing Agency. "Public Housing: The Work of the Federal Public Housing Authority." Washington, D.C.: GPO, March 1946.
- National Housing Agency. "Second Annual Report." Washington, D.C.: GPO, October 1944.
- National Housing Agency. "The Mutual Home Ownership Program." Washington, D.C.: Federal Public Housing Authority, January 1946.
- National Housing Agency. "War Housing In the United States." Washington, D.C.: GPO, April 1945.
- National Housing Agency. "Mutual Housing A Veteran's Guide: Organizing, financing, constructing, and operating several selected types of cooperative housing associations, with special reference to Available Federal Aids." Washington, D.C.: GPO, 1946.
- "Neither For Sale Nor Rent Are House at Camden, NJ Defense Project. Colonel Westbrook Combines Advantages of Both Merchandising Methods, Invents a Mutual Financing Plan for Investors and Occupants." Architectural Forum, June 1941 pp. 443–445.
- Palmer, C.F. "Palmer Proud of Record Set: Estimates Need in this Area at 12,000 More Units." Special Edition Courier Post. Camden, New Jersey. Saturday, December 16, 1941. p. 5.
- "Prospectus for the Organization of a National Mutual Housing Association." Office of Congressman Jerry Voorhis. Washington, DC. Approx. 1945.
- Public Housing Administration. "First Annual Report Public Housing Administration." Washington, D.C.: GPO, 1948.
- Rutgers University Bureau of Economic Research. An Economic Profile of Winfield Park, New Jersey: Including Alternatives For the Use of Community Resources. New Brunswick, N.J.: Bureau of Economic Research, 1965.
- Senate Hearings on Proposed General Housing Act of 1945. " Hearings Before the Committee on Banking and Currency, Part 2, December 6,7,11,12,13,14,17,18, 1945, January 24 and 25, 1946, Revised." Washington, D.C.: GPO, 1946.
- Senate Hearings on Senate Resolution 71, (A Resolution Authorizing and Directing An Investigation of the National Defense Program). "Investigation of the National Defense Program, Part 8, October 3,7,8,9,14,15,21,22,23,24,27,28,29, and 31, 1941." Washington, D.C.: GPO, 1942.
- Senate Hearings on Senate Resolution 71, (A Resolution Authorizing and Directing An Investigation of the National Defense Program). "Investigation of the National Defense Program, Part 15, November 18,19, 23, 24 and 25, 1942." Washington, D.C.: GPO, 1943.
- Smith, Jason Scott. Building New Deal liberalism: the political economy of public works, 1933-1956. Cambridge University Press, 2006.
- "Strauss Condemns Housing Programs: USHA Administrator Criticizes Coordinator and Urges an End of 'Unnecessary' Agencies." New York Times. November 13, 1941. p. 17.
- Szylvian Bailey, Kristin. The Federal Government and the Cooperative Housing Movement, 1917-1955. Unpublished Doctoral Dissertation Carnegie-Mellon University, 1988.
- Szylvian, Kristin M. "Our Mutual Friend: A Progressive Housing Legacy from the 1940s." Designer Builder: A Journal of the Human Environment. Vol. 111 No. 9. January 1997.
- Szylvian, Kristin M., "The Federal Housing Program During World War II" in From Tenements to The Taylor Homes: In Search of An Urban Housing Policy in Twentieth Century America edited by John F. Bauman, Roger Biles and Kristin Szylvian. Pennsylvania State Press, 2000.
- "Tenants Buy Town in New Home Plan: US is Sponsor of a Mutual Housing Project it has Put Up at Audubon, NJ." New York Times. November 9, 1941. p. 44
- Time Magazine, "Not for Rent, Not for Sale", June 2, 1941.
- Time Magazine, "Whose Fault", October 13, 1941.
- Time Magazine, "Two Scandals", November 30, 1942.
- "Town is White Inside and Out: In the Borough of Audubon Park, There is One Non-White Resident Out of a Population of 1,150 Residents." The Philadelphia Inquirer. March 10, 1991.
- United States Housing Authority. "Annual Report of the United States Housing Authority." Washington, D.C.: GPO, 1940.
- "United States Speeds Village of New Homes for Defense Workers, Audubon Village, NJ." Special Edition Courier Post. Camden, New Jersey. Saturday, December 16, 1941. pp. 1–16.
- Westbrook, Lawrence. "Farm Tenancy: A Program." The Nation. January 9, 1937. Vol. 144, No. 2, pp. 39–41.
- Westbrook, Colonel Lawrence (as told to George Creel), "No Down Payment", Colliers Magazine, February 2, 1946. pp. 26–27.
- "With Benefit of Local Planning: Dallas Park Housing Project, Dallas Texas, Burns Roensch, Architect." Architectural Record. Volume 90, Number 5, November 1941. p. 84-85.

== Related projects ==
- Atchison Village, Richmond, California
- Greenbelt, Maryland
- Greenhills, Ohio
- Greendale, Wisconsin
- Arthurdale, West Virginia
- Aluminum City Terrace, Pittsburgh, Pennsylvania
- Kramer Homes, Center Line, Michigan
- Pine Ford Acres, Middletown, Pennsylvania
- Channel Heights, San Pedro, California
- Vanport City, Oregon
