= Aluminum City Terrace =

Housing development

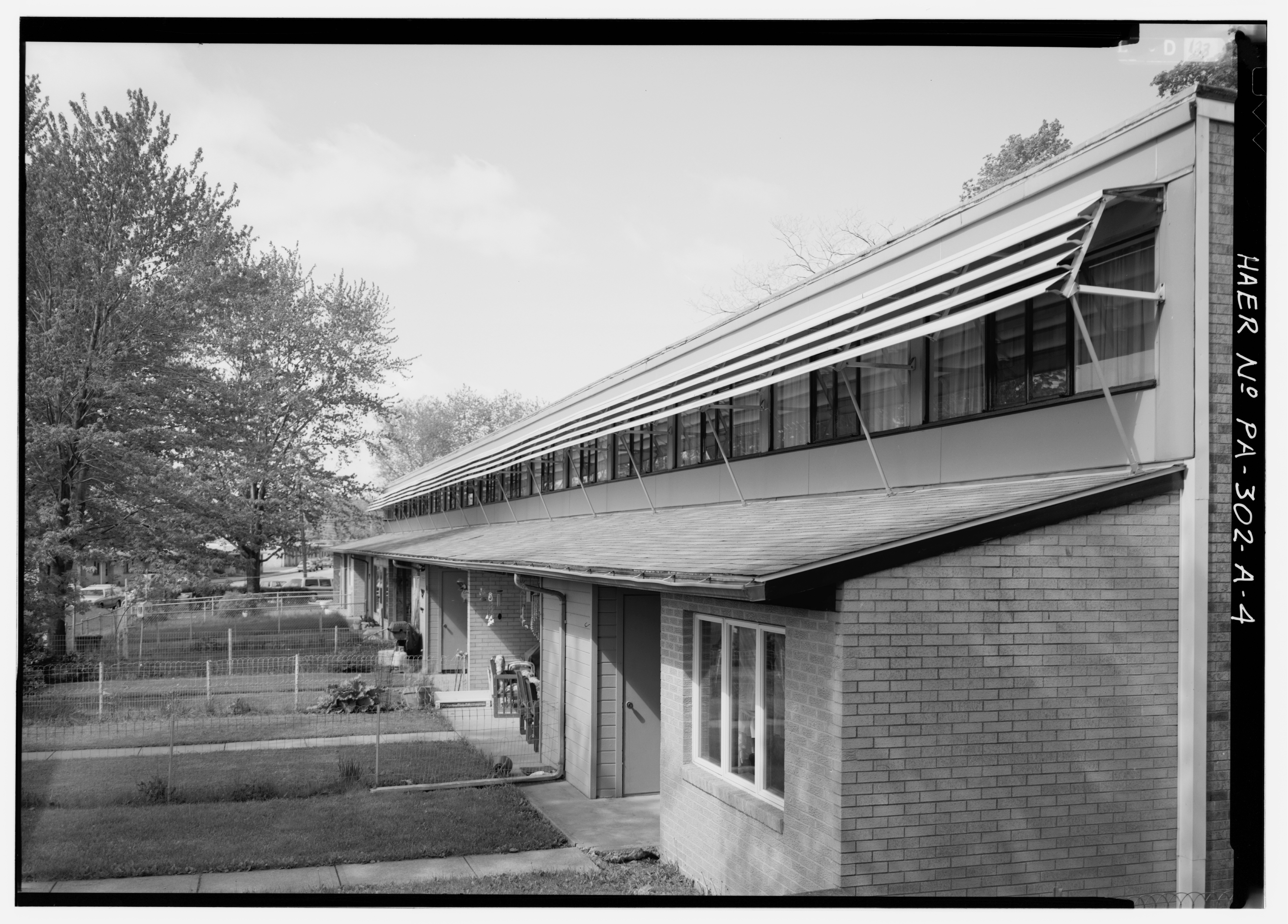
- The complex in 1994
- Interactive map of Aluminum City Terrace
- Location: New Kensington, Pennsylvania
- Coordinates: 40.57196948829529°N 79.74111054452608°W

Companies
- Architect: Walter Gropius and Marcel Breuer
- Developer: FWA

Aluminum City Terrace (also referred to as ACT) is a housing development located in New Kensington, near Pittsburgh. Walter Gropius and Marcel Breuer designed the complex during their relatively short period as collaborative partners after receiving a commission from the FWA. In the United States, their partnership mostly produced single-family residences.

The complex was originally designed as affordable housing for workers in nearby defense plants. These workers were mostly employed by Alcoa, an aluminum conglomerate headquartered in Pittsburgh. The complex originally contained 250 residential units, an elementary school, and a community center. The Modern design of the complex proved controversial, and local residents opposed the construction.

== History ==
=== Background ===
The FWA commissioned Modernist architects such as Walter Gropius, Marcel Breuer, Oscar Stonorov, and Richard J. Neutra to provide "modern" housing for workers and low-income families throughout the United States. This focus on Modernist and Internationalist architects was colored by the hope that the developments, which included then-rare shared amenities such as play areas for children, laundries, and sports facilities, would foster a sense of community, and render more traditional urban and suburban arrangements (referred to as "isolated") unappealing. Beyond ACT, examples of such housing include Techwood Homes, in Atlanta, and the Carl Mackley Houses, in Philadelphia.

Due to American involvement in World War II, strains were placed on housing near industrial sites. The Mutual Ownership Defense Housing Division of the FWA assessed the availability of housing for defense-related workers. In areas where production might be threatened by scarce labor due to housing shortages, the DDH made recommendations that housing be built.

=== World War II and construction ===
Based on recommendations by the Defense Housing Division and approval by President Roosevelt, the FWA commissioned Aluminum City Terrace as part of a plan to bring some 5000 new units to Pittsburgh and the surrounding area. An increase in employees at plants near New Kensington had created a particularly accute housing shortage, with vacancy rates as low as 0.6%, necessitating new units.

Alcoa, New Kensington's primary employer, expressed skepticism over FWA plans for Aluminum City Terrace due to fears the development's emphasis of social components could render unionization efforts among its employees easier. Industrial concerns at the time also preferred that their employees purchase housing, rather than rent, as it tethered them financially and geographically to the plant, so reducing overturn. As plans were released, locals, including New Kensington mayoral candidate and real estate owner W.C. Wally, opposed the development as they resented its intrusion into the local real estate market. Wally and others opposed it based on aesthetic grounds as well. Wally dismissed the project as "chicken coops" but despite winning the mayoral race and did not succeed in preventing its construction. He did, however, renege on a promise by the previous mayor to finance a new road to make accessing Aluminum City Terrace easier, and to date the road has not been built.

To accelerate construction, components of the development were standardized to accelerate. A compressed timeline meant Gropius could not prepare using larger-scale offsite prefabrication for ACT, an approach he had experimented with in Germany. After construction, workers were skeptical about the housing, as it did not accommodate oversized kitchen appliances and furniture. Additionally, a stigma developed around the complex, with some referring to it as "the project" due to the government's involvement in its construction. However, the housing did successfully foster a sense of community, partially due to programming at the now-defunct community center.

=== After World War II ===
Both residents of ACT and New Kensington worried that the end of World War II would mean the sale of the complex to a private company, or its conversion to low-income, government-supported housing. Residents of the complex instead lobbied the Housing and Home Finance Agency to purchase the complex and convert it to a co-op. After gaining enough support, residents were successful, and purchased the complex in 1948. Funds for the down payment came from selling shares in the co-op, and a bank financed the rest.

The community is still extant as a co-op today, and remains affordable, with monthly fees ranging from $360 and $380.

== Design ==
The buildings are well-preserved relative to other instances of Bauhaus and Modernist architecture.
