= Lawrence Westbrook (politician) =

American politician

Colonel Lawrence Westbrook (23 August 1889 – January 24, 1964) was a Texan politician and official in the administration of President Franklin D. Roosevelt. A 1908 graduate of the University of Texas and later the University of Texas Law School. Colonel Westbrook also served as a member of the Texas Legislature representing Waco, Texas. During World War I he attained the rank of lieutenant colonel in the Army Signal Corps. He was among the pallbearers of Felix Huston Robertson, a war-criminal known for the Saltville Massacre of black soldiers and as the last surviving general of the Confederate States of America. He married Mrs. Martha Wootton Collings in Hot Springs, Arkansas in March 1937. During World War II Colonel Westbrook returned to active duty and was wartime president of the United States Purchasing Board in the South Pacific theater where he was awarded the Order of the British Empire from New Zealand. While serving in the South Pacific he was responsible for a survey of all defense resources for this region. Colonel Westbrook died January 24, 1964 in San Angelo, Texas.

== Early career ==
Lawrence Westbrook was born in Belton, Texas to a well-established Texas family.

Westbrook, eventually the developer of the little-known Mutual Ownership Defense Housing Division – a program of cooperatively owned housing projects for middle-income residents funded by the US Government – began his career late in the 1920s with his own self-initiated program for organizing rural Texas farmers into a cooperative marketing body. Today, in 2009, while the US is experiencing the popping of a real estate bubble, the mutual ownership concept is especially interesting, as it was based on the idea that traditional home ownership was not the best economic choice for many middle income families. Since it ties these families to their home during times of economic recession or depression, it makes it difficult for them to move and follow available employment opportunities. In the early 1930s, Westbrook and his program attracted favorable attention from regional New Deal officials, and in 1931 Westbrook was appointed to the position of Director of the Texas Relief Commission. While involved in the Texas relief programs Westbook was intensely interested in supporting the development of the Texas Parks system. He was a close friend of influential Congressman and Speaker of the United States House of Representatives (1940–1947, 1949–1953 and 1955–1961) Sam Rayburn which the Westbrook family reports was a key in Colonel Westbrook's success while working within the US Government. During Colonel Westbrook's experience as a Texas public official he became convinced of the benefits of cooperative enterprises. In quick succession, he was promoted to Assistant Federal Emergency Relief Administrator in the Rural Rehabilitation Division, and then to First Assistant Work Projects (WPA) Administrator Harry L. Hopkins. They became friends and Mr. Hopkins would serve as best man at Colonel Westbrook's marriage in 1937.

In 1934, Colonel Westbrook joined the Federal Emergency Relief Administration and by 1936 he was responsible within the WPA for managing a community in Pontiac, Michigan called West Acres. This project was designed as a cooperative housing option for auto workers. As a federal government official, Westbrook would work in the area of public housing and President Roosevelt would also credit him with developing the administration's rural rehabilitation program. In the early 1930s while part of the Federal Relief Administration he was placed in charge of dealing with drought areas in the upper midwest and briefed President Roosevelt on his train while passing through this area. While serving as First Assistant in the WPA he also was in charge of the Homestead Project which included one of Eleanor Roosevelt's pet projects, Arthurdale, West Virginia. Colonel Westbrooks involvement with the WPA also included chairing the WPA Advisory Board starting in 1936 after resigning as first assistant to "devote more time to personal matters." In 1937, he supported the granting of a subsidy to cotton growers while he served as a special investigator in charge of a US Senate investigation of cotton cooperatives. His involvement and interest in the housing problems of the low and middle income groups grew out of this experience and research in public housing. His step daughter, Madge Westbrook Brown, also reported that as a west Texan living in Washington, DC, Colonel Westbrook was frustrated by the lack of green space and was committed to developing housing in a park setting. He was also committed to providing the very best architectural environments for the low and middle-class residents of his housing develops. He would go on to hire some of the very top architects of his time to design his projects including Richard Neutra. The housing problems he identified included the inability of the middle class to accumulate the necessary capital to move out of the rental market, the unstable nature of their employment, and the lack of flexibility within the housing market that would permit easy adjustments to the ever-changing size and needs of each family. Westbrook believed that eliminating the required downpayment for housing purchases would actually make the middle class a better risk for home ownership by simply allowing them to keep financial reserves that could carry them through difficult times. Inspired by the success of the government-sponsored Rural Electrification Cooperatives Program, Westbrook set about applying many of the cooperative principles to the middle income housing problem; what resulted was the Mutual Home Ownership concept.

== Mutual Home Ownership Concept ==
By 1938, believing he could turn the Mutual Home concept into reality, Westbrook left the US government (where he could not find enough support for his ideas) to develop a privately financed, 1000-unit, "Park living housing development" in Duval County, Florida. The design, by David Williams and modernist architect Richard Neutra, echoed many of the innovative design elements of the planned community of Radburn, New Jersey including pedestrian focused designs with unit front doors facing away from streets and toward park areas and other units across a common yard. However, financial support for this project was never fully found, and the development had to be scrapped. Returning to the government, Westbrook submitted the Mutual Home plan to the Government's Temporary National Economic Committee, where it was filed away until 1940.

In 1940, with the demand for defense housing growing steadily, Congressman Frederick Garland Lanham (D-Texas), chairman of the House Committee on Public Buildings and Grounds, coordinated a meeting between Howard Hunter, Commissioner of Works Projects Administration, and Westbrook, to discuss the mutual home ownership concept with John Carmody, Administrator of the Federal Works Agency. These influential individuals had come across the plan in the records of the Temporary National Economic Committee. They were so impressed with the plan that they asked Westbrook to serve as Special Assistant to Mr. Carmody with the responsibility for a newly established Mutual Ownership Defense Housing Division, which was charged with adapting the mutual housing plan to the demands of the Defense Housing initiatives. One of the projects completed was the Winfield Park Mutual Ownership Defense Housing Project (Project Number 28071).

This was a time when public housing programs were being presented as model governmental projects that utilized internationally recognized architects and urban planners for their development and implementation. From their inception the eight projects of the mutual housing effort differed from traditional defense housing projects because they were meant to be sold to their residents under the mutual ownership plan. Soon the real estate industry and home builders placed enormous pressure on the Federal Government to end this public housing effort, that they feared could result in the wholesale economic socialization of the home building industry.

By 1942, the forces aligned against government sponsored middle income housing programs contributed to the final demise of the mutual housing experiment. Additionally, with the resource limitation of the war becoming increasingly more evident by 1942, the entire defense housing effort moved to the construction of temporary structures rather than high quality permanent housing. Even the eventual purchase of the projects by their residents was threatened during the late 1940s. But thanks to extensive lobbying by labor unions and the project residents themselves, the necessary legislation and approvals were completed for the purchases and as of 2009 seven of the original eight projects continue to operate within the mutual ownership plan.

The mutual ownership projects are an example of success in the early US public housing effort before conservative forces took control and promoted private solutions. The highly touted Housing Act of 1949 promised the construction of 810,000 low-cost public housing units by 1955, yet by 1964 only 550 of these units had actually been built.

== Later career ==
During the 1950s Colonel Westbrook became an official of the Democratic National Committee and was dismissed on October 30, 1952 following charges of involvement in a kickback scheme regarding a United States Government contract for tungsten with Atlantica Companhia of Portugal for $9 million. He was accused of being a "five per center" as he and his associated received 5 percent fee for handling the contract. Colonel Westbrook defended his conduct, claiming that his actions were an attempt to save the government money and that a rival sought to sell tungsten to the US at inflated prices; he was later cleared of all charges by the United States Court of Appeals and the US Government was ordered to pay Atlantica $508,200 for breach of contract.

Colonel Westbrook also completed a manuscript of his memoirs entitled The Boondogglers. It was never published but the manuscript is part of his personal papers held in The Texas Collection at Baylor University.
