= Federal Works Agency =

Independent New Deal agency of the United States federal government

The Federal Works Agency (FWA) was an independent agency of the federal government of the United States which administered a number of public construction, building maintenance, and public works relief functions and laws from 1939 to 1949. Along with the Federal Security Agency and Federal Loan Agency, it was one of three catch-all agencies of the federal government pursuant to reorganization plans authorized by the Reorganization Act of 1939, the first major, planned reorganization of the executive branch of the government of the United States since 1787.

== History ==
During the Great Depression, the federal government created a large number of agencies whose mission was to construct public works (such as parks, water treatment systems, roads, and buildings), employ the unemployed to construct such works, and to issue loans and grants to regional authorities, states, counties, and localities for the construction of public works.

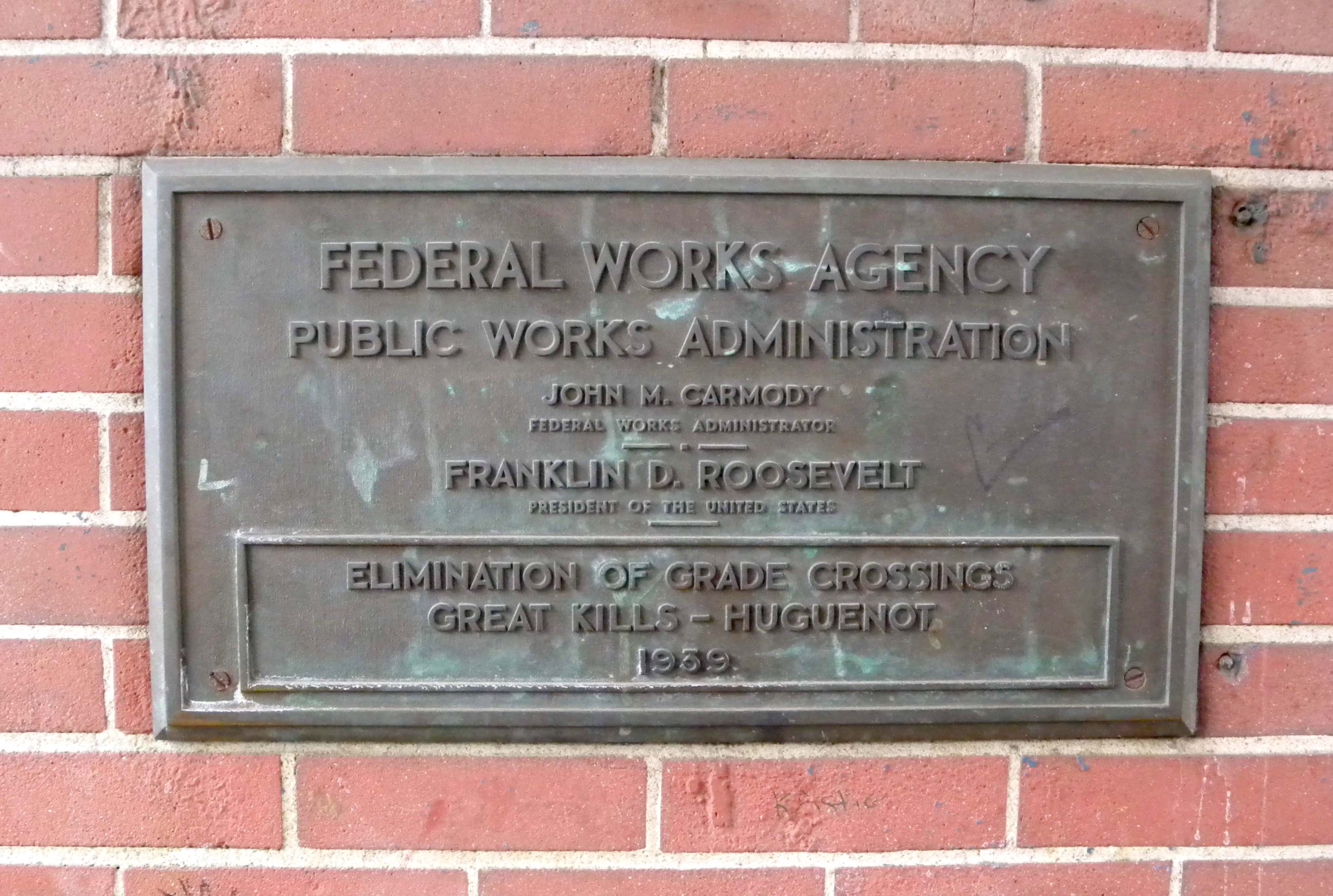
1939 FWA/PWA plaque celebrating the Staten Island Rapid Transit (New York City) grade-elimination project completion.

Many influential members of Congress, political scientists, and public administration experts had strongly criticized the proliferation of executive branch agencies as inefficient. On April 3, 1939, President Franklin D. Roosevelt signed into law the Reorganization Act of 1939, which for two years gave him the authority (under certain limitations) to reorganize existing departments, agencies, bureaus, commissions and committees of the federal government to achieve efficiency and economy. Pursuant to the Act, President Roosevelt issued Reorganization Plan No. 1 (promulgated April 25, 1939; effective July 1, 1939).

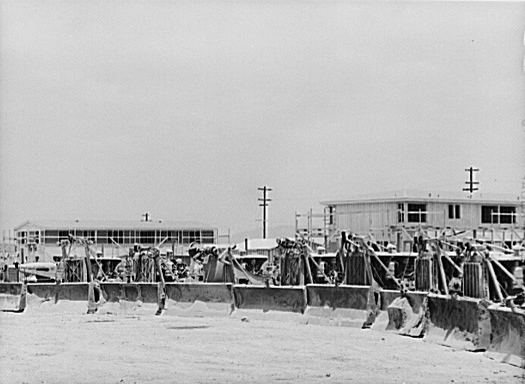
Defense worker housing at Kearney-Mesa, California, being built by the Public Buildings Administration of the Federal Works Agency in May 1941. Photograph by Russell Lee.

Reorganization Plan 1 created the Federal Works Agency, bringing together the Bureau of Public Roads, the Public Buildings Branch of the Procurement Division, the Branch of Buildings Management of the National Park Service, the United States Housing Authority, the Federal Emergency Administration of Public Works, and the Works Progress Administration. With global hostilities rising prior to the start of World War II, the FWA used the authority granted to it by the Defense Housing and Community Facilities and Services Act of October 1940 (Act of October 14, 1940; ch. 862, 54 Stat. 1125; commonly known as the "Lanham Act") to establish, by administrative order on July 16, 1941, the Division of Defense Public Works (DDPW). DDPW's role was to fund and supervise the construction of national defense public works, primarily housing, public health facilities, schools, child care facilities, and recreation areas for communities impacted by fast-growing defense industries. FWA created the Division of War Public Service (DWPS) by administrative order on August 3, 1942, under the Lanham Act to administer public services required by the war. The FWA, at about the same time, also created the Mutual Ownership Defense Housing Division to design and construct housing for middle income defense workers under the direction of Colonel Lawrence Westbrook, Special Assistant to the Federal Works Administrator.

Additional changes came during the war. By Executive Order 9070 (using authority granted under the First War Powers Act), the U.S. Housing Authority was moved under the National Housing Authority and redesignated as the Federal Public Housing Authority on February 24, 1942. The Public Works Administration, a Depression-era agency which distributed construction loans and grants as a form of relief, was abolished by Executive Order 9357 on June 30, 1943. The Works Project Administration was abolished, effective June 30, 1943, by order of the President to the Administrator of the FWA on December 4, 1942.

== Dissolution ==
Significant consolidation occurred in the post-war period, which finally led to the dismantling of the FWA. DDPW and DWPS were merged by administrative order into a new Bureau of Community Facilities (BCF) on January 1, 1945. In 1947, President Harry S. Truman appointed the First Hoover Commission to study the functions of the federal government and recommend administrative and managerial changes. Although the First Hoover Commission recommended merging the FWA into a new Department of Public Works (which would oversee all non-military federal construction), opposition from special interests and several federal agencies (such as the Army Corps of Engineers) led Truman to recommend abolishing the FWA, transferring some functions to other agencies, and creating a new "housekeeping" agency to manage government construction needs and federally owned buildings. On June 30, 1949, Congress passed the Federal Property and Administrative Services Act (63 Stat. 377), which abolished the FWA and transferred its few remaining functions to the newly created General Services Administration.
