= Redlining =

Systemic denial of services to some areas

A 1937 HOLC "residential security" map of Philadelphia, classifying various neighborhoods by estimated "riskiness" of mortgage loans

Redlining is a discriminatory practice from the United States, in which financial services are withheld from neighborhoods that have significant numbers of racial and ethnic minorities. Redlining has mostly been directed against African Americans, as well as Mexican Americans in the Southwestern United States, Jewish Americans, and Italian Americans. The most common examples involve denial of credit and insurance, denial of healthcare, and the development of food deserts in minority neighborhoods.

Reverse redlining occurs when a lender or insurer targets majority-minority neighborhood residents with inflated interest rates by taking advantage of the lack of lending competition relative to non-redlined neighborhoods. The effect also emerges when service providers artificially restrict the supply of real estate available for loanable funds to nonwhites, thus providing alternative pretext for higher rates. Neighborhoods which were targeted for blockbusting were also subject to reverse redlining.

In the 1960s, sociologist John McKnight originally coined the term to describe the discriminatory practice in Chicago, Illinois of banks classifying certain neighborhoods as "hazardous," or not worthy of investment due to the racial makeup of their residents. In the 1980s, a Pulitzer Prize-winning series of articles by investigative reporter Bill Dedman demonstrated how Atlanta banks would often lend in lower-income white neighborhoods but not in middle-income or even upper-income Black neighborhoods.

The documented history of redlining in the United States is a manifestation of the historical systemic racism that has had wide-ranging impacts on American society, two examples being educational and housing inequality across racial groups. Redlining is also an example of spatial inequality and economic inequality.

== History ==
The specific process termed "redlining" in the United States occurred on the background of racial segregation and discrimination against minority populations. It had its origins in sales practices of the National Association of Real Estate Boards and theories about race and property values codified by economists surrounding Richard T. Ely and his Institute for Research in Land Economics and Public Utilities, founded at the University of Wisconsin in 1920. With the National Housing Act of 1934 the federal government began to be involved in the practice and the concurrent establishment of the Federal Housing Administration (FHA). The FHA's formalized redlining process was developed by their Chief Land Economist, Homer Hoyt, as part of an initiative to develop the first underwriting criteria for mortgages. The implementation of this federal policy accelerated the decay and isolation of minority inner-city neighborhoods through withholding of mortgage capital, making it even more difficult for neighborhoods to attract and retain families able to purchase homes. The discriminatory assumptions in redlining exacerbated residential racial segregation and urban decay in the United States.

Page of HOLC document for above Philadelphia redlining map. Covering zone D20, one of the red areas. It lists one of the 'Detrimental Influences' as a "concentration of Negros and Italians."

In 1935, the Federal Home Loan Bank Board (FHLBB) asked the Home Owners' Loan Corporation (HOLC) to look at 239 cities and create "residential security maps" to indicate the level of security for real-estate investments in each surveyed city. On the maps, the newest areas—those considered desirable for lending purposes—were outlined in green and known as "Type A". These were typically affluent suburbs on the outskirts of cities. "Type B" neighborhoods, outlined in blue, were considered "Still Desirable", whereas older "Type C" were labeled "Declining" and outlined in yellow. "Type D" neighborhoods were outlined in red and were considered the most risky for mortgage support. While about 85% of the residents of such neighborhoods were white, they included most of the African-American urban households. These neighborhoods tended to be the older districts in the center of cities; often they were also African-American neighborhoods, and only six majority African-American neighborhoods in the entire United States were not evaluated as "Type D." Urban planning historians theorize that the maps were used by private and public entities for years afterward to deny loans to people in black communities, though planners and historians have debated the exact role of HOLC and its maps in redlining.

Redlining maps even became prominent under private organizations, such as appraiser J. M. Brewer's 1934 map of Philadelphia. Private organizations created maps designed to meet the requirements of the Federal Housing Administration's underwriting manual. The lenders had to consider FHA standards if they wanted to receive FHA insurance for their loans. FHA appraisal manuals instructed banks to steer clear of areas with "inharmonious racial groups", and recommended that municipalities enact racially restrictive zoning ordinances. Between 1945 and 1959, African Americans received less than 2 percent of all federally insured home loans.

Banks and mortgage lenders were not the only private entities to develop redlining practices. Property insurance companies also instituted rigid redlining policies in the post-World War II period. According to urban historian Bench Ansfield, the postwar advent of comprehensive homeowners' insurance was limited to the suburbs and withheld from neighborhoods of color in U.S. cities. One Aetna bulletin from 1964 advised underwriters to "use a red line around questionable areas on territorial maps." The New York Urban Coalition warned in 1978, "A neighborhood without insurance is a neighborhood doomed to death."

Following a National Housing Conference in 1973, a group of Chicago community organizations led by The Northwest Community Organization (NCO) formed National People's Action (NPA), to broaden the fight against disinvestment and mortgage redlining in neighborhoods all over the country. This organization, led by Chicago housewife Gale Cincotta and Shel Trapp, a professional community organizer, targeted The Federal Home Loan Bank Board, the governing authority over federally chartered Savings and loan associations (S&L) that held at that time the bulk of the country's home mortgages. NPA embarked on an effort to build a national coalition of urban community organizations to pass a national disclosure regulation or law to require banks to reveal their lending patterns.

For many years, urban community organizations had battled neighborhood decay by attacking blockbusting (deceptive encouragement of white flight from neighborhoods in order to buy up real estate at a huge discount and then rent to low-income, usually black tenants), forcing landlords to maintain properties, and requiring cities to board up and tear down abandoned properties. These actions addressed the short-term issues of neighborhood decline. Neighborhood leaders began to learn that these issues and conditions were symptoms of disinvestment that was the true, though hidden, underlying cause of these problems. They changed their strategy as more data was gathered.

With the help of NPA, a coalition of loosely affiliated community organizations began to form. At the Third Annual Housing Conference held in Chicago in 1974, eight hundred delegates representing 25 states and 35 cities attended. The strategy focused on the Federal Home Loan Bank Board (FHLBB), which oversaw S&Ls in cities all over the country.

In 1974, Chicago's Metropolitan Area Housing Association (MAHA), made up of representatives of local organizations, succeeded in having the Illinois State Legislature pass laws mandating disclosure and outlawing redlining. In Massachusetts, organizers allied with NPA confronted a unique situation. Over 90% of home mortgages were held by state-chartered savings banks. A Jamaica Plain neighborhood organization pushed the disinvestment issue into the statewide gubernatorial race. The Jamaica Plain Banking & Mortgage Committee and its citywide affiliate, The Boston Anti-redlining Coalition (BARC), won a commitment from Democratic candidate Michael S. Dukakis to order statewide disclosure through the Massachusetts State Banking Commission. After Dukakis was elected, his new Banking Commissioner ordered banks to disclose mortgage-lending patterns by ZIP code. The suspected redlining was revealed. Richard W. "Rick" Wise, a former community organizer who led the Boston organizing, has published a novel, Redlined, which gives a somewhat fictionalized account of the anti-redlining campaign.

NPA and its affiliates achieved disclosure of lending practices with the passage of The Home Mortgage Disclosure Act of 1975. The required transparency and review of loan practices began to change lending practices. NPA began to work on reinvestment in areas that had been neglected. Their support helped gain passage in 1977 of the Community Reinvestment Act.

== Efforts to end ==
=== Legislation ===
In the United States, the Fair Housing Act of 1968 was passed to combat the practice of redlining. The Fair Housing Act of 1968 made the discriminatory housing policies linked to redlining illegal. According to the Department of Housing and Urban Development, "The Fair Housing Act makes it unlawful to discriminate in the terms, conditions, or privileges of sale of a dwelling because of race or national origin. The Act also makes it unlawful for any person or entity involved in residential real estate-related transactions to discriminate against any person in making available such a transaction, or in the terms or conditions of such a transaction, because of race or national origin." The Office of Fair Housing and Equal Opportunity is tasked with administering and enforcing this law.

The Equal Credit Opportunity Act (ECOA), codified at 15 U.S.C. § 1691 et seq., was enacted on October 28, 1974. This law makes it unlawful for any creditor to discriminate against any applicant regarding any aspect of a credit transaction based on race, color, religion, national origin, sex, marital status, or age (provided the applicant has the capacity to contract). It also prohibits discrimination based on the applicant's income deriving from a public assistance program or the applicant's good faith exercise of any right under the Consumer Credit Protection Act. The ECOA applies to any person who regularly participates in credit decisions, including banks, retailers, bankcard companies, finance companies, and credit unions.

The part of the law that defines its authority and scope is known as Regulation B, referenced as 12 C.F.R. § 1002.1(b) (2017). from the (b) that appears in Title 12 part 1002's official identifier: 12 C.F.R. § 1002.1(b) (2017). Failure to comply with Regulation B can subject a financial institution to civil liability for actual and punitive damages in individual or class actions. Liability for punitive damages can be as much as $10,000 in individual actions and the lesser of $500,000 or 1% of the creditor's net worth in class actions.

The Community Reinvestment Act (CRA), passed by Congress in 1977, requires banks to apply the same lending criteria in all communities.

=== Regulatory lawsuits ===
In May 2015, the U.S. Department of Housing and Urban Development announced that Associated Bank had agreed to a $200 million settlement over redlining in Chicago and Milwaukee. The three-year HUD observation led to the complaint that the bank purposely rejected mortgage applications from black and Latino applicants. The final settlement required AB to open branches in non-white neighborhoods.

New York Attorney General Eric Schneiderman announced a settlement with Evans Bank for $825,000 on September 10, 2015. An investigation had uncovered the erasure of black neighborhoods from mortgage lending maps. According to Schneiderman, of the over 1,100 mortgage applications the bank received between 2009 and 2012, only four were from African Americans. Following this investigation, The Buffalo News reported that more banks could be investigated for the same reasons in the near future. The most notable examples of such DOJ and HUD settlements have focused heavily on community banks in large metropolitan areas, but banks in other regions have been the subject of such orders as well, including First United Security Bank in Thomasville, Alabama, and Community State Bank in Saginaw, Michigan.

The United States Department of Justice announced a $33 million settlement with Hudson City Savings Bank, which services New Jersey, New York, and Pennsylvania, on September 24, 2015. The six-year DOJ investigation had proven that the company was intentionally avoiding granting mortgages to Latinos and African Americans and purposely avoided expanding into minority-majority communities. The Justice Department called it the "largest residential mortgage redlining settlement in its history." As a part of the settlement agreement, HCSB was forced to open branches in non-white communities. As U.S. Attorney Paul Fishman explained to Emily Badger for The Washington Post, "[i]f you lived in a majority-black or Hispanic neighborhood and you wanted to apply for a mortgage, Hudson City Savings Bank was not the place to go." The enforcement agencies cited additional evidence of discrimination in Hudson City's broker selection practices, noting that the bank received 80 percent of its mortgage applications from mortgage brokers but that the brokers with whom the bank worked were not located in majority African-American and Hispanic areas.

On January 12, 2023, City National Bank of California agreed to pay $31,000,000 to resolve allegations of redlining from 2017 to at least 2020, brought by the United States Department of Justice.

=== Community organizations ===
ShoreBank, a community-development bank in Chicago's South Shore neighborhood, was a part of the private sector fight against redlining. Founded in 1973, ShoreBank sought to combat racist lending practices in Chicago's African-American communities by providing financial services, especially mortgage loans, to local residents. In a 1992 speech, then-Presidential candidate Bill Clinton called ShoreBank "the most important bank in America". On August 20, 2010, the bank was declared insolvent, closed by regulators and most of its assets were acquired by Urban Partnership Bank.

In the mid-1970s, community organizations, under the banner of the NPA, worked to fight against redlining in South Austin, Illinois. One of these organizations was SACCC (South Austin Coalition Community Council), formed to restore South Austin's neighborhood and to fight against financial institutions accused of propagating redlining. This got the attention of insurance regulators in the Illinois Department of Insurance, as well as federal officers enforcing anti-racial discrimination laws.

== Current issues ==
=== Racial segregation in American cities ===
The United States Federal Government has enacted legislation since the 1970s to reduce the segregation of American cities. While many cities have reduced the amount of segregated neighborhoods, some still have clearly defined racial boundaries. Since 1990, the City of Chicago has been one of the most persistently racially segregated cities, despite efforts to improve mobility and reduce barriers. Other cities like Detroit, Houston, and Atlanta likewise have very pronounced black and white neighborhoods, the same neighborhoods that were originally redlined by financial institutions decades ago. While other cities have made progress, this continued racial segregation has contributed to reduced economic mobility for millions of people.

Formerly redlined neighborhoods in places like Los Angeles have been shown to be more likely to have a gang injunction issued against them, as the work of geographer Stefano Bloch and anthropologist Susan A. Phillips shows.

=== Racial covenants: current efforts ===
While racist covenants, conditions, and restrictions (CCRs) were ruled "unenforceable" by the U.S. Supreme Court in the landmark 1948 case Shelley v. Kraemer, this decision did not make them illegal; it only prevented courts from enforcing them. It was not until the passage of the federal Fair Housing Act of 1968 that such discriminatory practices were explicitly outlawed.

State-Level Legislation

- California: AB 1466, passed in 2021, requires county recorders to identify and redact discriminatory covenants from property records. This builds on earlier legislation that allowed homeowners to request the removal of such language.
- Washington: The state passed a law in 2021 that requires all real estate documents to be free from racially restrictive covenants and provides a process for property owners to have them removed.
- Minnesota: The Minnesota Legislature passed a law in 2019 that enables homeowners to remove racial covenants from their property deeds through a simple process. This law was heavily influenced by the Mapping Prejudice project, which has mapped and documented racial covenants in the Twin Cities.

Public awareness and education

- Historical Research and Documentation: Projects like Mapping Prejudice in Minneapolis and the Seattle Civil Rights and Labor History Project have worked to document and publicize the extent of racial covenants, raising awareness about their historical impact.

Digital archives and databases

Universities and nonprofits are creating searchable databases of racial covenants to help homeowners and researchers access information about these restrictive clauses.

- One resource is the Mapping Inequality: Redlining in New Deal America project, a collaborative effort involving the University of Richmond, Virginia Tech, and others. This project focuses on the maps and area descriptions produced by the Home Owners' Loan Corporation (HOLC) in the 1930s. It provides digitized HOLC maps showing redlined areas, detailed descriptions, and analyses of the impact of these practices on urban development. Mapping Inequality helps provide historical context for understanding the systemic nature of housing discrimination.
- The Seattle Civil Rights & Labor History Project at the University of Washington includes a comprehensive collection of documents related to racial covenants in Seattle. This project offers historical maps, property records, and oral histories documenting the experiences of affected communities. It supports educational initiatives and helps inform public policy on housing equity.
- Redlining Louisville: Racial Capitalism and Real Estate, a project by the Louisville Metro Government, offers an interactive map showing the impact of redlining and racial covenants. It includes maps, narratives, and data sets that illustrate the long-term effects of these discriminatory practices.

=== Race wealth gap ===
The practice of redlining actively helped to create what is now known as the Racial Wealth Gap seen in the United States.

According to studies from American Economic Journal , HOLC maps show how deeply those redlining grades shaped neighborhoods over time. Those areas that were labeled as 'D' in the 1930s didn't just struggle then but are continuing to face the following struggles today; lower home values, low number of homeowners, and higher levels of racial segregation for decades. These studies show that inequalities continue to remain seen in today's housing markets.

Black families in America earned just $57.30 for every $100 in income earned by white families, according to the Census Bureau's Current Population Survey. For every $100 in white family wealth, black families hold just $5.04. In 2016, the median wealth for black and Hispanic families was $17,600 and $20,700, respectively, compared with white families' median wealth of $171,000. The black-white wealth gap has not recovered from the Great Recession. In 2007, immediately before the Great Recession, the median wealth of blacks was nearly 14 percent that of whites. Although black wealth increased at a faster rate than white wealth in 2016, blacks still owned less than 10 percent of whites' wealth at the median.

A multigenerational study of people from five race groups analyzed upward mobility trends in American cities. The study concluded that black men who grew up in racially segregated neighborhoods were substantially less likely to gain upward economic mobility, finding "black children born to parents in the bottom household income quintile have a 2.5% chance of rising to the top quintile of household income, compared with 10.6% for whites." Because of this intergenerational poverty, black households are "stuck in place" and are less able to grow wealth.

A 2017 study by Federal Reserve Bank of Chicago economists found that redlining—the practice whereby banks discriminated against the inhabitants of certain neighborhoods—had a persistent adverse impact on the neighborhoods, with redlining affecting homeownership rates, home values and credit scores in 2010. Since many African-Americans could not access conventional home loans, they had to turn to predatory lenders (who charged high interest rates). Due to lower home ownership rates, slumlords were able to rent out apartments that would otherwise be owned.

=== Financial services ===
==== Student loans ====
In December 2007, a class action lawsuit was brought against student loan lending giant Sallie Mae in the United States District Court for the District of Connecticut. The class alleged that Sallie Mae discriminated against African American and Hispanic private student loan applicants. The case alleged that the factors Sallie Mae used to underwrite private student loans caused a disparate impact on students attending schools with higher minority populations. The suit also alleged that Sallie Mae failed to properly disclose loan terms to private student loan borrowers. The lawsuit was settled in 2011. The terms of the settlement included Sallie Mae agreeing to make a $500,000 donation to the United Negro College Fund and the attorneys for the plaintiffs receiving $1.8 million in attorneys' fees.

==== Credit cards ====
Credit card redlining is a spatially discriminatory practice among credit card issuers, of providing different amounts of credit to different areas, based on their ethnic-minority composition, rather than on economic criteria, such as the potential profitability of operating in those areas. Scholars assess certain policies, such as credit card issuers reducing credit lines of individuals with a record of purchases at retailers frequented by so-called "high-risk" customers, to be akin to redlining.

==== Banks ====
Much of the economic impacts we find as a result of redlining and the banking system directly impact the African American community. Beginning in the 1960s, there was a large influx of black veterans and their families moving into suburban white communities. As blacks moved in, whites moved out and the market value of these homes dropped dramatically. In observation of said market values, bank lenders were able to keep close track by literally drawing red lines around the neighborhoods on a map. These lines signified areas that they would not invest in. By way of racial redlining, not only banks but savings and loans companies, insurance companies, grocery chains, and even pizza delivery companies thwarted economic vitality in black communities. The severe lacking in civil rights laws in combination with the economic impact led to the passing of the Community Reinvestment Act in 1977.

Racial and economic redlining set the people who live in these communities up for failure from the start, so much so that banks would often deny people who came from these areas bank loans or offered them at stricter repayment rates. As a result, there was a very low rate at which people (in particular African Americans) were able to own their homes; opening the door for slum landlords (who could get approved for low interest loans in those communities) to take over and do as they saw fit.

==== Insurance ====
Gregory D. Squires wrote in 2003 that data showed that race continues to affect the policies and practices of the insurance industry. Racial profiling or redlining has a long history in the property-insurance industry in the United States. From a review of industry underwriting and marketing materials, court documents, and research by government agencies, industry and community groups, and academics, it is clear that race has long affected and continues to affect the policies and practices of the insurance industry. Home-insurance agents may try to assess the ethnicity of a potential customer just by telephone, affecting what services they offer to inquiries about purchasing a home insurance policy. This type of discrimination is called linguistic profiling. There have also been concerns raised about redlining in the automotive insurance industry. Reviews of insurance scores based on credit are shown to have unequal results by ethnic group. The Ohio Department of Insurance in the early 21st century allows insurance providers to use maps and collection of demographic data by ZIP code in determining insurance rates. The FHEO Director of Investigations at the Department of Housing and Urban Development, Sara Pratt, wrote:

Like other forms of discrimination, the history of insurance redlining began in conscious, overt racial discrimination practiced openly and with significant community support in communities throughout the country. There was documented overt discrimination in practices relating to residential housing—from the appraisal manuals which established an articulated "policy" of preferences based on race, religion and national origin. to lending practices which only made loans available in certain parts of town or to certain borrowers, to the decision-making process in loans and insurance which allowed the insertion of discriminatory assessments into final decisions about either.

==== Mortgages ====
In reverse redlining, lenders and insurers target minority consumers by charging them more than a similarly situated white consumer would be charged, specifically marketing the most expensive and onerous loan products. In the 2000s, some financial institutions considered black communities as suitable for subprime mortgages. Wells Fargo partnered with churches in black communities, where pastors would deliver "wealth building" sermons encouraging new mortgage applications. The bank would then make a donation to the church in return for every new application. Many working-class blacks wanted to be included in the nation's home-owning trend. Instead of empowering them to contribute to homeownership and community progress, predatory lending practices through reverse redlining stripped the equity homeowners sought and drained the wealth of those communities for the enrichment of financial firms. The growth of subprime lending, higher cost loans to borrowers with flaws on their credit records, prior to the 2008 financial crisis, coupled with growing law enforcement activity in those areas, clearly showed a surge in manipulative practices. Not all subprime loans were predatory, but virtually all predatory loans were subprime. Predatory loans are dangerous because they charge unreasonably higher rates and fees compared to the risk, trapping homeowners in unaffordable debt and often costing them their homes and life savings.

A survey of two districts of similar incomes, one being largely white and the other largely black, found that bank branches in the black community offered exclusively subprime loans. Studies found out that high-income blacks were almost twice as likely to end up with subprime home-purchase mortgages compared to low-income whites. Fueled by deep racism, some loan officers referred to blacks as "mud people" and to subprime lending as "ghetto loans". Lower savings rate and distrust of banks, stemming from this legacy of redlining, may explain why there are fewer financial institutions in minority neighborhoods. In the early 21st century, brokers and telemarketers actively encouraged subprime mortgages to be offered to minority residents. A majority of the loans were refinance transactions, allowing homeowners to take cash out of their appreciating property or pay off credit card and other debt.

Redlining has helped preserve residential segregation between blacks and whites in the United States. Lending institutions such as Wells Fargo have shown that they treat black mortgage applicants differently when they are buying homes in white neighborhoods than when buying homes in black neighborhoods by offering them subprime and predatory loans when black residents try and integrate neighborhoods.

The inequality in loaning extends past residential to commercial loans as well; Dan Immergluck writes that in 2002, small businesses in black neighborhoods received fewer loans, even after accounting for business density, business size, industrial mix, neighborhood income, and the credit quality of local businesses.

Several State Attorneys General have begun investigating these de facto practices, which may violate fair lending laws. The NAACP filed a class-action lawsuit charging systematic racial discrimination by more than a dozen banks.

These are not isolated incidents. According to the US Department of Justice, since 2021 alone, the department has announced 11 redlining cases and secured over $109 million in relief for communities of color that have been the victims of lending discrimination nationwide. The three most wealthy banks in the US, Bank of America, JPMorgan Chase, and Wells Fargo have all been discovered participating in discriminatory lending.

Wells Fargo, the largest residential home mortgage originator in the United States, settled a lawsuit in 2012 after it was discovered they were using discriminatory lending practices against African-American and Hispanic borrowers between 2004 and 2009. This settlement, the second-largest fair lending settlement in the history of the United States Department of Justice, involves compensation of $184.3 million for wholesale borrowers who were steered into subprime mortgages or charged higher fees and rates than white borrowers due to their race or national origin. Wells Fargo agreed to provide $50 million in direct down payment assistance to affected communities. In this suit, it was shown that in 2007 customers in the Chicago area who borrowed $300,000 from Wells Fargo through an independent broker had on average paid $2,937 more in broker fees if African-American, and $2,187 more if Hispanic, compared with white borrowers with similar credit risk.

In 2011, Bank of America, the second-largest bank in the U.S., settled a lawsuit for $335 million. The lawsuit alleged that the bank charged higher fees and interest rates to African American and Hispanic borrowers compared to white borrowers with similar credit profiles. These citizens were completely taken advantage of. "Chances are, the victims had no idea they were being victimized, It was discrimination with a smile" said Thomas E. Perez, the Justice Department's assistant attorney general for civil rights. More recently, in 2017, JPMorgan Chase settled a lawsuit for $55 million. The lawsuit again alleged that the bank charged higher interest rates and fees to minority borrowers than to white borrowers with similar credit profiles for mortgage loans between 2006 and 2009.

A quantitative analysis examining trends in racial discrimination in the U.S. housing market from 1976 to 2016 found that discrimination by the means of direct denial of mortgage rates has significantly decreased since the 1970s, but that racial gaps in mortgage costs have not. In addition, they found that the probability of receiving a response to an initial inquiry is 8% lower among blacks, 4% lower among Hispanics, and 3% lower among Asians compared to whites.

=== Environmental racism ===
Neighborhoods' current socioeconomic susceptibility is impacted by the historical redlining in the 1930s, one of several racist and discriminatory practices. Redlined communities continued to be segregated by race and economic status as a result of this discriminatory strategy, which was based on racial demography and perceived risk for mortgage investment. Which leads to investments in those areas being less likely. Policies related to redlining and urban decay can also act as a form of environmental racism, which in turn affect public health. Urban minority communities may face environmental racism in the form of parks that are smaller, less accessible and of poorer quality than those in more affluent or white areas in some cities, which may have an indirect effect on health, since young people have fewer places to play, and adults have fewer opportunities for exercise. A 2022 study published in the journal Environmental Science & Technology Letters found redlined areas in 202 US cities had higher levels of air pollution (nitrogen dioxide and fine particulate matter) in 2010. One of the most important environmental risk factors, exposure to combustion-related air pollutants is directly linked to a host of health effects, such as cardiovascular disease, respiratory conditions, and cardiovascular death. African-Americans are 75 percent more likely than others to live near facilities that produce hazardous waste and pollutants. Philadelphia, which has a 44 percent Black population, received a warning from the American Lung Association in 2019: "If you live in Philadelphia County, the air you breathe may put your health at risk." It was found that a refinery in Grays Ferry, Philadelphia, is responsible for most of the toxic air emissions in the city. The refinery had not been in compliance with the Clean Air Act for 9 out of the 12 quarters through 2019.

Professor Kyung Hwa Jung of Columbia University's College of Physicians and Surgeons wrote in 2022 on the legacy of residential redlining in American history and its implications for the temporal patterns of air pollution surrounding schools in New York City today. Using land-use regression models from the NYC Community Air Survey, they looked at the annual average concentrations of combustion-related air pollutants (black carbon (BC), particulate matter (PM2.5), nitrogen dioxide (NO_{2}), and nitric oxide (NO)) in a 250-meter radius around schools. They concentrated on schools because, given how densely populated New York City is, a 2006 study that was cited suggested that schools may be a significant source of exposure to BC and PM2.5 because they are frequently situated close to busy roads and heavy truck routes. in which "6.4 million US children attended schools within 250 m of a major roadway and were likely exposed to high levels of traffic pollution" Moreover, a recent study discovered that historical redlining in American cities has been connected to differences in air pollution levels, with greater levels of PM2.5 and NO_{2} in redlined communities than in non-redlined regions. Black, Hispanic, and Asian individuals are generally more exposed to PM2.5 than white individuals are. Black and Hispanic groups are also more exposed to BC, even when socioeconomic status has been taken into account. Kyung Hwa Jung's study came up with the same results, indicating that, compared to other areas, historically redlined communities in New York City had greater rates of Black people, deprivation, socioeconomic vulnerability, and inferior youth opportunity. They also had higher diesel emissions and a larger density of local truck routes. Despite the fact that pollution levels in NYC have decreased compared to historical levels due to recent environmental laws, non-redlined neighborhoods still exhibit significant levels of air pollution.

In 1990, Robert Wallace wrote that the pattern of the AIDS outbreak during the 1980s was affected by the outcomes of a program of "planned shrinkage" directed at African-American and Hispanic communities. It was implemented through systematic denial of municipal services, particularly fire protection resources, essential to maintain urban levels of population density and ensure community stability. Institutionalized racism affects general health care as well as the quality of AIDS health intervention and services in minority communities. The over-representation of minorities in various disease categories, including AIDS, is partially related to environmental racism. The national response to the AIDS epidemic in minority communities was slow during the 1980s and 1990s, showing an insensitivity to ethnic diversity in prevention efforts and AIDS health services.

Environmental justice scholars such as Laura Pulido, Department Head of Ethnic Studies and Professor at the University of Oregon, and David Pellow, Dehlsen and Department Chair of Environmental Studies and Director of the Global Environmental Justice Project at the University of California, Santa Barbara, argue that recognizing environmental racism as an element stemming from the entrenched legacies of racial capitalism is crucial to the movement, with white supremacy continuing to shape human relationships with nature and labor.

=== Digital redlining ===
Digital redlining is a term used to refer to the practice of creating and perpetuating inequities between racial, cultural, and class groups specifically through the use of digital technologies, digital content, and the internet. Digital redlining is an extension of the historical housing discrimination practice of redlining to include an ability to discriminate against vulnerable classes of society using algorithms, connected digital technologies, and big data. This extension of the term tends to include both geographically based and non-geographically based discrimination. For example, in March 2019 the United States Department of Housing and Urban Development (HUD) charged Facebook with housing discrimination over the company's targeted advertising practices. While these charges included geographically based targeting in the form of a tool that allowed advertisers to draw a red line on a map; they also included non-geographically based methods that did not use maps but rather utilized algorithmic targeting using Facebook's user profile information to directly exclude specific groups of people. A press release from HUD on March 28, 2019, stated that HUD was charging that "Facebook enabled advertisers to exclude people whom Facebook classified as parents; non-American-born; non-Christian; interested in accessibility; interested in Hispanic culture; or a wide variety of other interests that closely align with the Fair Housing Act's protected classes."

=== Political redlining ===
Political redlining is the process of restricting the supply of political information with assumptions about demographics and present or past opinions. It occurs when political campaign managers delimit which population is less likely to vote and design information campaigns only with likely voters in mind. It can also occur when politicians, lobbyists, or political campaign managers identify which communities to actively discourage from voting through voter suppression campaigns.

=== Redlining and health inequality ===
According to Journal of General Internal Medicine , redlining and other forms of structural racism still shape people's health today. It outlines that neighborhoods affected by redlining are the ones that typically face higher rates of illness like diabetes, heart disease, and hypertension. Due to limited access to good housing, healthy foods, and medical care, and the struggle of getting access to insurance. A systematic review and meta-analysis in 2022 found that women living in historically redlined areas had significantly higher odds of preterm birth compared to those in non-redlined areas. Research published in Proceedings of the National Academy of Sciences found associations between historical redlining and cardiovascular health outcomes.

Health inequality in the United States persists today as a direct result of the effects of redlining. Health in America is synonymous with wealth, both of which minority groups have been denied as a result of discriminatory practices. Wealth affords the privilege of living in a neighborhood or community with clean air, pure water, outdoor spaces and places for recreation and exercise, safe streets during the day and night, infrastructure that supports the growth of intergenerational wealth through access to good schools, healthy food, public transportation, and opportunities to connect, belong, and contribute to the surrounding community. Wealth also provides stability of home as those with capital are not confined to the deteriorating housing stock that minority groups who were redlined were forced to try and rehabilitate without access to loans.

==== Cancer Outcomes ====
Another outcome associated with redlining is varying cancer outcomes. For example, a study published in the Journal of the American Medical Association found non-redlined areas to have more favorable breast cancer outcomes among non-Latina white women. A 2023 study published in the Journal of the American College of Surgeons found that, beyond cancer outcomes, redlining also contributes to lower cancer screening rates. Specifically, the study found that, in redlined versus non-redlined neighborhoods, there were 24% lower odds of being screened for breast cancer, 64% lower odds for colorectal cancer, and 79% lower odds in cervical cancer. It is important that strategies to combat screening disparities be structurally competent and location-specific, as Amanda Harper, senior staff writer at Ohio State's Comprehensive Cancer Center – James Cancer Hospital and Solove Research Institute writes. For example, if transportation is a barrier, travel vouchers or mobile clinics should be employed. The health inequalities that arise from redlining manifest in many forms, and cancer outcomes and screening are two ways redlined communities present differences when compared to non-redlined communities.

==== Life Expectancy ====
Overall life expectancy has improved, but there are still discrepancies between the life expectancies of different racial groups. The concentration of disparities in minority neighborhoods, reinforced by redlining, has resulted in worse health outcomes and lower life expectancies in these neighborhoods. Continued economic isolation and property devaluation resulting from redlining have widened the differences in life expectancy between redlined communities and neighboring highly rated communities. When comparing redlined neighborhoods to highly graded neighborhoods by the Home Owners' Loan Corporation, life expectancy in redlined communities is on average 3.6 years lower. However, there is significant variation in this difference among different cities. In Baltimore, red or yellow rated communities, meaning "declining," or "risky for mortgage support," had a life expectancy five years shorter than communities rated green or blue, meaning "desirable." In Richmond, Virginia, one predominantly black neighborhood has a life expectancy of 21 years shorter than that of a nearby predominantly white neighborhood, which had been highly rated by the HOLC in the 1930s.

==== COVID-19 ====
Redlining intentionally excluded black Americans from accumulating intergenerational wealth. The effects of this exclusion on black Americans' health continue to play out daily, generations later, in the same communities. This is evident currently in the disproportionate effects that COVID-19 has had on the same communities which the HOLC redlined in the 1930s. Research published in September 2020 overlaid maps of the highly affected COVID-19 areas with the HOLC maps, showing that those areas marked "risky" to lenders because they contained minority residents were the same neighborhoods most affected by COVID-19. The Centers for Disease Control (CDC) looks at inequities in the social determinants of health like concentrated poverty and healthcare access that are interrelated and influence health outcomes with regard to COVID-19 as well as quality of life in general for minority groups. The CDC points to discrimination within health care, education, criminal justice, housing, and finance, direct results of systematically subversive tactics like redlining which led to chronic and toxic stress that shaped social and economic factors for minority groups, increasing their risk for COVID-19. Healthcare access is similarly limited by factors like a lack of public transportation, child care, and communication and language barriers which result from the spatial and economic isolation of minority communities from redlining. Educational, income, and wealth gaps that result from this isolation mean that minority groups' limited access to the job market may force them to remain in fields that have a higher risk of exposure to the virus, without options to take time off. Finally, a direct result of redlining is the overcrowding of minority groups into neighborhoods that do not boast adequate housing to sustain burgeoning populations, leading to crowded conditions that make prevention strategies for COVID-19 nearly impossible to implement.

After years of de facto discrimination achieved through redlining, a system of structural racism blocking the achievement of health equity for all Americans has developed. As a result, a de facto health narrative that does not inspire belonging, compel political participation, nor dictate strategic change towards the social justice model for health equity has matured. In order to eliminate health inequality in America, a new de facto health narrative needs to dictate strategy. The process for achieving health equity relies on healthcare leaders articulating, acting on, and building the vision into all decisions and structures that support equity. Sufficient resources must be allocated to establishing a governance structure that can oversee health equity work. This includes taking specific action to address the social determinants of building intergenerational wealth as well as confronting institutional racism within health systems themselves. Next, health systems need to address the socioeconomic determinants of health which disadvantage minority groups. Through training, education, support groups, housing support, improved transportation, resource assistance, and community health programs, health equity organizations can begin to break down the long-lasting barriers that tactics like redlining have imposed on achieving health equity. In addition to ensuring the equal health outcomes of patients, healthcare organizations can also utilize their position as employers to develop a more diverse workforce through improved hiring practices and ensuring living wages to minority employees.

== Strategies to reverse effects of redlining ==
Redlining has contributed to the long-term decline of low-income, inner city neighborhoods and the continuation of ethnic minority enclaves. Compared to prospering ethnic minority areas, historically redlined or other struggling black communities need targeted investments in infrastructure and services in order to prosper.

Some of these strategies include:

- Targeting planning resources to improve employment, incomes, wealth, the built environment, and social services in struggling communities.
- Recognize the importance of public transportation as a means for low-income communities to access jobs and services.
- Provide jobs near the labor supply through targeted economic development.
- Invest in the housing stock through neighborhood revitalization programs.
- Utilize inclusionary zoning (IZ) ordinances to improve amounts of high quality housing.
- Equitably distribute hazardous waste sites so they are not concentrated in low-income and minority areas.

Moreover, residents of historically redlined neighborhoods face risks for worse health outcomes and lower life expectancies. Healthcare professionals play a crucial role in efforts to reverse the impact of redlining on adverse health outcomes. Metzl and Hansen propose that the U.S. medical education system should train healthcare professionals to recognize the larger structural contexts and social and economic conditions that influence patient health outcomes, including the legacy of redlining. Infusing clinical training with structural awareness allows healthcare providers to consider the structural barriers that shape patients' health and illness. The faculty at Wayne State University School of Medicine in Detroit, Michigan launched a course called "Healing Between the Lines" to teach medical students and residents about the effects of structural injustices on health, including historical redlining as a "critical driver" of the life expectancy gap of Detroit. From a healthcare policy perspective, Egede and other scholars recommend Medicaid expansion, Medicaid coverage mandatorily including Community Health Worker services, value-based health system payments, and federal incentives for expanding hospitals and clinics. Healthcare providers and individuals in the healthcare system are crucial in addressing the long-lasting health consequences of historical redlining.

== See also ==
- Housing segregation
- Gentrification in the United States
- Ghetto tax
- Racial capitalism
- Sundown town
