= Union Miles Development Corporation =

Non-profit community development corporation

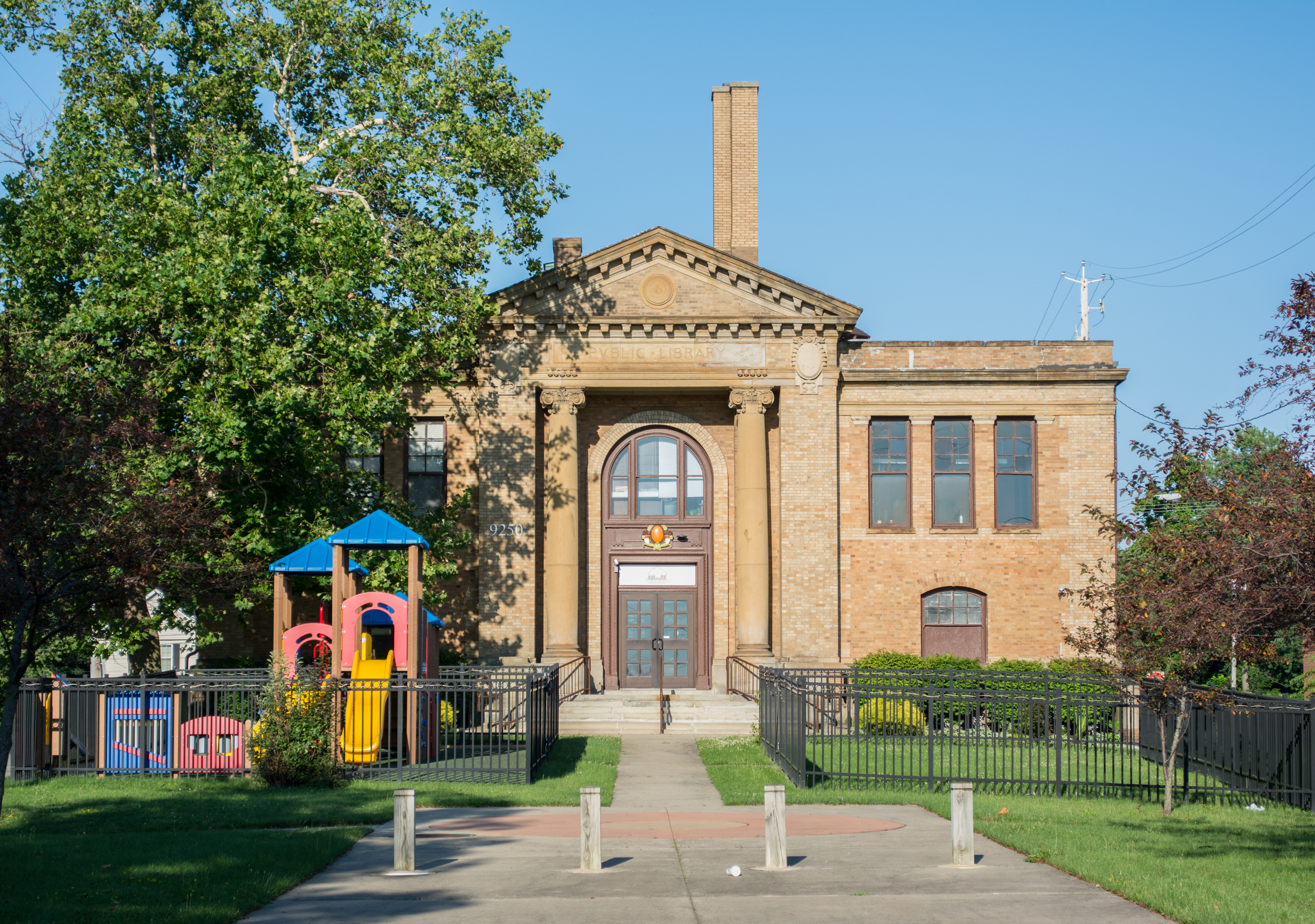
- Headquarters of the Union Miles Development Corporation in 2017
- Abbreviation: UMDC
- Formation: May 1, 1981; 45 years ago
- Founded at: Union-Miles Park, Cleveland, Ohio, U.S.
- Type: Community development corporation
- Legal status: Nonprofit organization
- Location: 9250 Miles Park Avenue, Cleveland, Ohio 44105
- Coordinates: 41.4468359°N 81.6220714°W
- Executive Director: Roshawn Sample
- Website: unionmiles.org

The Union Miles Development Corporation is a nonprofit community development corporation serving the Union-Miles Park statistical planning area in Cleveland, Ohio, in the United States. Created in 1981 by the Union Miles Community Coalition, it was successful in drawing national attention to discriminatory practices in lending practices and won passage of an Ohio law reforming housing foreclosure procedures.

== Formation ==
=== CCCA organizing ===
Cleveland had long suffered from racially discriminatory practices by lending institutions. The Union-Miles Park neighborhood, once a working class, white area, had suffered the loss of most of its employers in the 1959s and 1960s and seen extensive white flight. By the 1970s, the area was overwhelmingly African American, poor, crime-ridden, and decaying. The 1973–75 recession hit the area especially hard. Many of the most affordable homes were owned or leased by federal, city, or state public housing agencies, yet these homes were some of the most decrepit in the area.

The Union-Miles Community Coalition was the culmination of a decade-long process of social justice organizing in Cleveland. The Roman Catholic Diocese of Cleveland formed the Commission on Catholic Community Action (CCCA) in June 1969 to institutionalize its attempts to stem the economic and social losses in the greater Cleveland area. CCCA sought to preserve neighborhoods where the Catholic Church had invested a great deal of financial and human capital in staff, churches, and schools. A major programming area was Union-Miles Park, where there were a large number of Roman Catholic church which were rapidly losing members. CCCA organizers initially used community organizing tactics pioneered by Saul Alinsky. Strongly left-wing groups began to form at the block level. These were too radical for the diocese, which shifted its community organizing efforts to focus on empowerment and asset and wealth preservation. CCCA worked with the Catholic Campaign for Human Development and The George Gund Foundation to organize homeowners and the poor as part of their empowerment initiative.

CCCA efforts led directly to the creation of the Union Miles Development Corporation (UMDC). In January 1979, the CCCA helped local neighborhood block groups form a "reinvestment committee" to agitate around discriminatory practices in home improvement loans. In May 1979, the Union-Miles Community Coalition began picketing area housing lenders, including the Federal Housing Administration (FHA). Realizing that a neighborhood-wide effort was needed, CCCA organizers began pushing for the "reinvestment committee" to build an even larger, more representative coalition which would focus not just on the financial industry but on a range of community issues. During the summer, 185 groups in the Union-Miles Park neighborhood joined the new coalition. The new group, calling itself the Union Miles Community Coalition (UMCC), met for the first time on September 29, 1979.

=== UMCC efforts ===
UMCC initially focused its efforts on the practices of two federal agencies, the FHA and Veterans' Administration (VA). Both were major sources of low-interest home and home improvement loans in the area. (Note: One of the practices UMCC focused on was the way in which both agencies handled foreclosures. First, UMCC wanted the agencies to give minority and poor homeowners more time to correct arrears in loan payments. Second, UMCC wanted the agencies to move more quickly on reselling foreclosed homes. Both agencies tended to take many months, if not years, before attempting to resell a home. The presence of even one or two closed homes on a block caused the value of surrounding properties to fall significantly. As the number of empty or abandoned buildings rose, so did crime (particularly drug dealing), squatting, and vandalism, and the remaining property owners often reduced their maintenance even further. UMCC pressed the FHA and VA to not only sell homes faster, but to take much stronger measures to ensure their closed properties were in good repair and secure.) In October 1979, UMCC became first community group to win a hearing before the Comptroller of the Currency regarding discriminatory practices in violation of the Equal Credit Opportunity Act.

By 1980, it had become clear to CCCA organizers that the wider issue of economic development in Union-Miles Park needed to be tackled. But neither Famicos Corp. nor Lutheran Housing Corp. (the two largest nonprofit housing lenders in the city) wanted to become involved in the issue. CCCA staff pushed for the UMCC to establish a nonprofit corporate subsidiary, the Union Miles Development Corporation (UMDC), to take on these issues. Very gradually through 1980 and early 1981, UMCC began adopting procedures and resolutions to establish the new body.

== Operational history ==
UMDC was formally incorporated as a nonprofit organization on May 1, 1981. It received more than $100,000 ($400,000 in 2025 dollars) in start-up financing from a wide range of foundations and religious organizations.

UMCC swiftly faded away, however. In 1982, two left-wing groups, the Ohio Action Training Center (OATC) and National People's Action (NAP), decided to target Alton Whitehouse, the president of Standard Oil of Ohio ("Sohio"), over what they perceived as predatory oil and home heating fuel pricing. Both groups worked with UMCC, among other Cleveland-area community groups, to win support for their activities and to recruit protesters. In April 1982, the OATC and NAP disrupted the Sohio annual shareholder meeting. The weekend of September 10-12, 1982, the groups held another protest at the exclusive Chagrin Valley Hunt Club in Gates Mills, Ohio. More than 300 protesters clamored for Whitehouse to come out of the club and meet with them. (Whitehouse was not present that weekend.) The involvement of UMCC in these activities was not viewed favorably by either Catholic Charities USA or The Gund Foundation, and they both withdrew funding of UMCC. The organization soon withered away.

=== Receivership efforts ===
Initially, UMDC focused on winning grants for small projects that would immediately improve the value of existing, inhabited property. It won a grant to help low-income homeowners weatherize their properties, and another grant to train homeowners in basic home repair and maintenance. It also developed programs to prepare welfare-dependent and homeless families in bill-paying, budgeting, and other consumer skills so they could become reliable rent- or mortgage-paying citizens. The nonprofit declined to get involved in programs with long-term payoffs like Head Start or drug abuse prevention and treatment because of their expense. It also declined to join in a coalition with local businesses. Shortly after UMDC incorporated, businesses in Union-Miles Park formed the Southeast Improvement Association (SIA) to act as a voice for local business. SIA members were concerned that worsening crime in the neighborhood was causing their security costs to rise and made it difficult to attract night-shift workers. Infrastructure and public services in the area were deteriorating, and a lack of contiguous industrial space and extensive cross-streets made it difficult for businesses to expand. Limited funds and the failure of the city to assist in coordinating redevelopment efforts (which could have multiplied the positive impact of UMDC and SIA) discouraged UMDC from working on projects that had spillover potential (such as a land bank that could help businesses expand).

Instead, UMDC focused on a more conservative strategy designed to protect the existing assets and wealth of homeowners in the community. It partnered with other nonprofit development corporations in the city in 1981 to create the Cleveland Housing Network, an organization to help train staff in foreclosure and receivership issues and in housing redevelopment.

Receivership became a major early tool for UMDC. In 1982 and 1983, the nonprofit pioneered the use of receivership as a means of redeveloping abandoned property. An extensive legal analysis conducted by UMDC revealed that title to many abandoned but inhabitable properties was unclear. A large number of these properties had several owners, who often could not be located. Utilizing a patchwork of state laws, UMDC convinced a local court in March 1984 to place an abandoned home in receivership, with UMDC as trustee. The news media reported that it was believed to be the first time Ohio law had been used in this way. With technical assistance from Cleveland State University's Center for Neighborhood Development and a $61,000 ($200,000 in 2025 dollars) Ford Foundation grant, UMDC was able to remodel the home and sell it—helping to stave off a decline in the value of nearby properties, and remove a potential source of crime and vandalism. The difficulty in using existing law to obtain receivership led UMDC to push for passage of a new state law giving nonprofit community development corporations new powers to act as receivers of abandoned or foreclosed homes in distressed neighborhoods. This legislation, Substitute House Bill 706, became law in 1984.

In 1989, UMDC officials testified before Congress regarding fair credit lending practices and FHA's tendency to require larger fees from poorer homeowner loan applicants. This testimony directly influenced successful amendments to the Community Reinvestment Act.

=== New construction efforts ===
As UMDC's technical expertise and finances grew, it began financing new construction. The organization purchased vacant land owned by the city and in 1989 broke ground on an eight-home housing development called Miles Estates. In 1990, UMDC broke ground on the 11,700 square feet (1,090 m^{2}) Miles Avenue Shopping Center at E. 131st Street and Miles Avenue. This shopping center was the first substantial capital investment in area since the 1950s. In 1993, UMDC won an agreement from the city not to extend Martin Luther King Jr. Boulevard. Instead, the land which was to be used for the street extension was turned over to UMDC, which in 1993 began construction of the 16-home Harvard Glen housing project.

== Bibliography ==
- Keating, W. Dennis; Krumholz, Norman; Metzger, John (1995). "Postpopulist Public-Private Partnerships". In Keating, W. Dennis; Krumholz, Norman; Perry, David C. (eds.). Cleveland: A Metropolitan Reader. Kent, Ohio: Kent State University Press. ISBN 9780873384926.
- Kusmer, Kenneth L. (1976). A Ghetto Takes Shape: Black Cleveland, 1870-1930. Urbana, Ill.: University of Illinois Press. ISBN 9780252002892.
- Mendel, Stuart C. (2005). Mediating Organizations, Private Government, and Civil Society: Disinvestment Through the Preservation of Wealth in Cleveland, Ohio (1950-1990). Lewiston, N.Y.: Edwin Mellen Press. ISBN 9780773462335.
- Michney, Todd (2017). Surrogate Suburbs: Black Upward Mobility and Neighborhood Change in Cleveland, 1900-1980. Chapel Hill, N.C.: University of North Carolina Press. ISBN 9781469631936.
