= HANDS Inc. =

Housing and Neighborhood Development Services, Inc. or HANDS Inc. is a nonprofit housing group based in Orange, New Jersey. Since 1986, the organization has worked to revitalize residential and commercial properties throughout the tri-state area through foreclosure and negotiations with the owners. The rehabilitated homes and business properties are then resold to the community, generally to low-income citizens. In recent years, HANDS has worked with the local art organization ValleyArts to convert properties into art galleries. The projects are secured by federal and state community reinvestment funding.
