= Gale Cincotta =

Chicago-based community activist (1929–2001)

- Born: Aglaia Angelos; December 28, 1929; Chicago, Illinois
- Died: August 15, 2001 (aged 71); Maywood, Illinois
- Occupation: Community organizer
- Known for: Home Mortgage Disclosure Act, Community Reinvestment Act, National People's Action
- Spouse: Roy Cincotta

Gale Cincotta (December 28, 1929 – August 15, 2001), a community activist from the Austin neighborhood of Chicago, led the national fight for the US federal Home Mortgage Disclosure Act (HMDA) of 1975 and the Community Reinvestment Act (CRA) of 1977. The CRA requires banks and savings and loans to offer credit throughout their entire market areas and prohibits them from targeting only wealthier neighborhoods with their lending and services, a practice known as redlining. She was a co-founder with Shel Trapp of the National People's Action in Chicago, a coalition of some 300 community organizations throughout the United States, and served as its executive director and chairperson from 1973 until her death in 2001.

== Background ==
Cincotta was born Aglaia Angelos on December 28, 1929, in Chicago, Illinois, an only child. Her father was Greek and her mother was Latvian, and they ran Greek restaurants. Her parents were Socialists, and Cincotta grew up around political talk in her father's restaurant. She grew up in Garfield Park, and stayed on Chicago's West Side. In school, although she was punished for it, Cincotta described herself as ethnically American. Cincotta left school after tenth grade, and married a gas station owner. At age 16, she moved to Austin, Chicago with her new husband, Roy Cincotta. Cincotta had her first child at seventeen, and had six sons total. In 1952, Cincotta made the decision to send her children to Chicago Public Schools, and as they matriculated, she became increasingly displeased with the quality of their education. Her sons were not learning to read, classrooms were overcrowded, and textbooks were worn and outdated. Cincotta learned that the school system was spending $250 per student per year in Austin, compared with $650 per student in other schools. She joined the Parent-Teacher Association to work to improve conditions in the school and in the city.

== Activism ==
In Austin, Chicago in the 1960s, real estate agents, colloquially called "panic peddlers," encouraged white homeowners to sell before their property values fell, or before banks stopped lending to homeowners in the area, a practice called redlining. Cincotta became aware that the quality of the schools was tied to the real estate values in the area. Her activism branched from direct involvement with her children's schools to local movements for fairer financial practices. She led protests against unfair landlords and saw results. Through her community organizing work in the mid-1960s, Cincotta met with community organizers, including Shel Trapp, who would become her partner in activism. Cincotta and Trapp founded the Organization for a Better Austin (OBA), and Cincotta served as various committee chairs before serving as president of OBA for two years. In 1972, Cincotta, Trapp, and Anne-Marie Douglas founded the National Training and Information Center (NTIC), and laid the foundations of National People's Action (NPA). Also in the early 1970s, Cincotta took a position with the Metropolitan Area Housing Alliance. This job allowed Cincotta to support her family after her husband died in 1976.

Cincotta became known for her community organizing style. As the director of NPA, in addition to using formal channels of communication to reach politicians and bureaucrats, she organized "hits." "Hits" were confrontational protests outside of the offices, headquarters, and sometimes private residences of those in conflict with NPA. According to a statement by the NTIC, "At protests, Ms. Cincotta would alternately schmooze and threaten her targets, until they conceded the meetings she demanded." NPA led the national push for the Home Mortgage Disclosure Act (HMDA), which Cincotta and Trapp helped draft. According to Senator William Proxmire, HMDA "would never have become a law but for the research and local organizing activity undertaken by NPA." The culmination of Cincotta's activism was the Community Reinvestment Act (CRA) of 1977. Through her roles with the NTIC and NPA, Cincotta pushed for the passage of the CRA, and earned the appellation "Mother of the CRA."

In 1977, President Jimmy Carter appointed Cincotta to the National Commission on Neighborhoods. In the late 1980s, she served on Housing and Urban Development Secretary Jack Kemp''s National Commission on Regulatory Barriers to Affordable Housing. Of Cincotta, Kemp said she was "one of the most substantive and knowledgeable leaders in low- and moderate-income housing that I have met in the country." In 1994, Cincotta became a member of Fannie Mae''s Housing Impact Advisory Council, and in Chicago, she was on the Community Investment Advisory Council of the Federal Home Loan Bank.

Cincotta is well known for her flamboyant activism. In 1970, to protest inadequate pest control in Austin, Cincotta led a group of 100 protesters to nail a rat to the ward alderman's office door. In 1980, Cincotta was responsible for placing Saturday Night Live's Land Shark above the entrance to the Federal Reserve Bank (to imply the bankers were loan sharks), and red tape strung around the building (to symbolize redlining). This move prompted the bank chairman Paul Volcker to meet with Cincotta.

DePaul University Special Collections and Archives holds a collection of notes, research, and publications about Gale Cincotta. The collection was created by Michael Westgate and Ann Vick-Westgate while writing Gale Force: Gale Cincotta, the Battles for Disclosure and Community Investment, about Cincotta and her activism in Chicago.

== Awards ==
In 1985, Cincotta received the Chicago Commission on Human Rights Award, and Cincotta was named one of the Ms. Foundation Women of the Year. Cincotta also won the first Neighborhood Housing Services of Chicago Neighborhood Partnership Award.
