= Housing and Community Development Act =

Housing and Community Development Act, the name of several United States federal laws, may refer to:

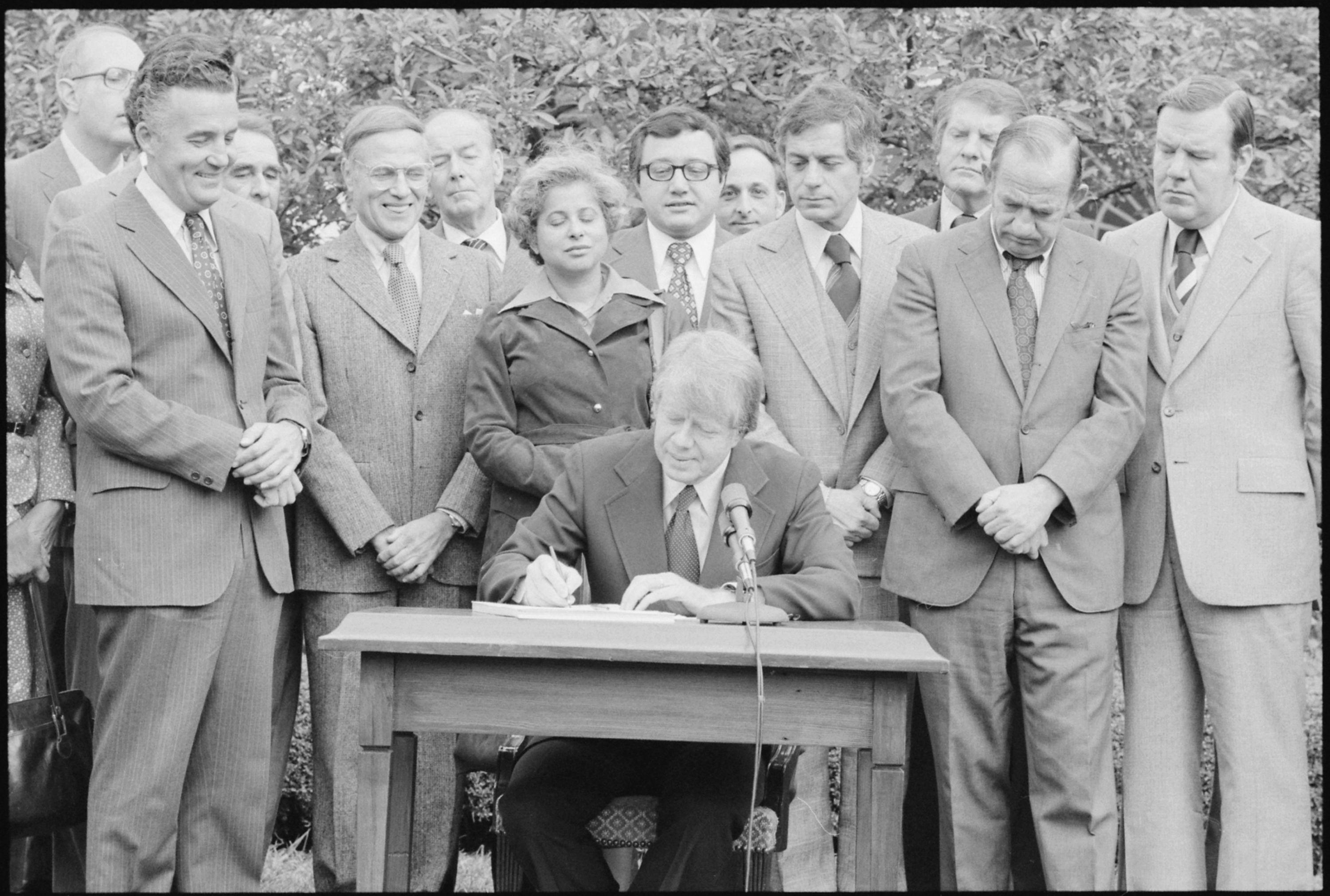
Jimmy Carter signs the Housing and Community Development Act, October 1977

- Housing and Community Development Act of 1974
- Housing and Community Development Act of 1977
- Housing and Community Development Act of 1980
- Housing and Community Development Act of 1987
- Housing and Community Development Act of 1992

== See also ==
- Community Reinvestment Act
