= Shel Trapp =

American community organizer

- Born: September 15, 1935
- Died: October 18, 2010 (aged 74–75)
- Occupation: Community activist

Shel Trapp (1935 – October 18, 2010) was a community organizer based in Chicago, co-founder of National People's Action (along with Gale Cincotta), and author of several books and pamphlets on community organizing. Trapp and Cincotta are widely credited with writing the Community Reinvestment Act (CRA). Trapp has also been responsible for training hundreds of community organizers throughout the United States through the National Training and Information Center. He retired in 2000 and died of pneumonia in October 2010.

== Bibliography ==
- John Koval, Larry Bennett, Michael Bennett, and Fassil Demissie, The New Chicago: A Social and Cultural Analysis (Temple University Press, 2006). ISBN 1-59213-088-7
- Rinku Sen and Kim Klein, Stir It Up: Lessons in Community Organizing and Advocacy (Jossey-Bass, 2003). ISBN 0-7879-6533-2
- David Walls, The Activist's Almanac: The Concerned Citizen's Guide to the Leading Advocacy Organizations in America (Simon & Schuster/Fireside, 1993). ISBN 0-671-74634-0
- Richard W. Wise, Redlined: A Novel of Boston, Brunswick House Press 2020) The battle against redlining in Jamaica Plain. 978-0972822336

== Pamphlets by Trapp ==
- Basics of Organizing. Chicago: National Training and Information Center, 1986.
- Blessed Be the Fighters: Reflections on Organizing . . . Collected Essays. Chicago: National Training and Information Center, 1986.
- Dynamics of Organizing. Chicago: National Training and Information Center, 1976.
