= Home Mortgage Disclosure Act =

United States federal law

- Long title: An Act to extend the authority for the flexible regulation of interest rates on deposits and share accounts in depository institutions, to extend the National Commission on Electronic Fund Transfers, and to provide for home mortgage disclosure.
- Enacted by: the 94th United States Congress
- Effective: December 31, 1975

Citations
- Public law: 94-200
- Statutes at Large: 89 Stat. 1124

Codification
- Titles amended: 12 U.S.C.: Banks and Banking
- U.S.C. sections created: 12 U.S.C. ch. 29 §§ 2801-2811
- U.S.C. sections amended: 12 U.S.C. ch. 3 § 461 et seq.

Legislative history
- Introduced in the Senate as S. 1281 by William Proxmire (D–WI) on March 21, 1975; Committee consideration by Senate Banking, Housing, and Urban Affairs, House Banking, Currency, and Housing; Passed the Senate on September 4, 1975 (45-37); Passed the House on October 31, 1975 (177-147, in lieu of H.R. 10024); Reported by the joint conference committee on December 12, 1975; agreed to by the Senate on December 15, 1975 (agreed) and by the House on December 18, 1975 (agreed); Signed into law by President Gerald Ford on December 31, 1975

The Home Mortgage Disclosure Act (or HMDA, pronounced HUM-duh) is a United States federal law enacted in 1975 that requires most mortgage lenders to collect and publicly disclose data about their lending activity. The law is implemented by Regulation C (12 CFR Part 1003), administered by the Consumer Financial Protection Bureau (CFPB) on behalf of the Federal Financial Institutions Examination Council (FFIEC).

Congress enacted HMDA in response to concerns that lenders were contributing to the decline of urban neighborhoods by failing to provide adequate home financing on reasonable terms, a practice known as redlining. The law serves three statutory purposes: providing the public with information to assess whether lenders are serving community credit needs, helping public officials direct investment to underserved areas, and enabling identification of potentially discriminatory lending patterns.

HMDA data are among the most widely used public datasets in the United States. Federal regulators including the Department of Justice and the CFPB use the data to identify fair lending violations and bring enforcement actions against discriminatory lenders. Researchers, journalists, and community organizations use it to analyze mortgage market trends and racial and economic disparities in lending. The CFPB publishes annual reports analyzing mortgage market activity and trends based on HMDA data. Lenders themselves use HMDA data for Community Reinvestment Act compliance and self-assessment.

The scope of HMDA data collection has expanded significantly since 1975. The Financial Institutions Reform, Recovery, and Enforcement Act of 1989 added requirements for demographic data on borrowers. The Dodd–Frank Wall Street Reform and Consumer Protection Act of 2010 transferred rulemaking authority to the CFPB and mandated collection of additional data fields including credit scores and loan pricing. The Economic Growth, Regulatory Relief and Consumer Protection Act of 2018 provided partial reporting exemptions for smaller lenders. HMDA is a disclosure law that relies on public scrutiny for its effectiveness; it does not prohibit any specific lending activity or establish quotas for mortgage lending in any geographic area.

== History ==
In the decades following the New Deal, federal housing policies institutionalized racial discrimination in mortgage lending. The Home Owners' Loan Corporation, established in 1933, created residential security maps that graded neighborhoods by perceived investment risk, typically assigning the lowest grades to African-American and immigrant communities. These red-coded areas were deemed hazardous for lending, giving rise to the term redlining. The Federal Housing Administration, created in 1934, adopted similar practices, recommending racially homogeneous neighborhoods and endorsing the use of restrictive covenants.

By the late 1960s, residents of urban neighborhoods observed that banks were closing branches, refusing mortgage applications, and contributing to neighborhood decline through disinvestment. The movement for mortgage disclosure emerged from neighborhood organizing in Chicago, where Gale Cincotta and Shel Trapp founded the Organization for a Better Austin and later the National Training and Information Center. In 1972, Cincotta and Trapp helped establish National People's Action, a coalition of community organizations that pressed for federal action on redlining. Activists documented that banks were taking deposits from urban neighborhoods while refusing to make mortgage loans there, but without disclosure requirements, communities had no way to verify lending patterns systematically.

Senator William Proxmire, a Wisconsin Democrat who chaired the Senate Banking Committee, introduced the Home Mortgage Disclosure Act in 1975 with support from National People's Action and allied community organizations. The bill faced opposition from the banking industry. HMDA passed the Senate 45 to 37 on September 4, 1975, and the House 177 to 147 on October 31, 1975. President Gerald Ford signed HMDA into law on December 31, 1975. The original law required lenders to disclose the geographic distribution of mortgage loans by census tract, enabling lenders to better assess the market, regulators to scrutinize lending and communities to identify patterns of disinvestment. Proxmire subsequently championed the Community Reinvestment Act of 1977, which used HMDA data as part of the framework for evaluating whether banks served community credit needs.

== Who reports HMDA data? ==
US financial institutions must report HMDA data to their regulator if they meet certain criteria, such as having assets above a specific threshold. The criteria are different for depository and non-depository institutions and are available on the FFIEC website. Additional information on institutional and transactional coverage for HMDA data collection years 2017 and onward can be found on the CFPB's regulation implementation page. The datasets containing information on HMDA reporters are the HMDA Panel and HMDA Transmittal Sheet.

Beginning with the 2024 data release in June 2025, the CFPB did not produce the HMDA Reporter Panel, a file that had previously provided institution-level information including asset size, LEI, RSSD ID, Other Lender Code, and identifiers linking HMDA reporters to datasets such as the National Information Center. The Reporter Panel is not required by HMDA or Regulation C. According to HMDA compliance software vendor RATA Associates, the CFPB stated the Panel is "unlikely to be produced as it is out of the operational scope authorized for HMDA Operations." The Panel was also absent from the preliminary 2025 data release in March 2026. The CFPB also did not publish its annual Reportable HMDA Data reference chart for 2025 data collection, ending a series that had run from 2018 through 2024. The absence of these products complicates identification of the assets, ownership, and institutional scope of individual HMDA reporters.

== Purpose and uses ==
HMDA data serve multiple constituencies and are among the most widely used public datasets in U.S. housing policy and research.

Mortgage lenders themselves are major users of HMDA data. Institutions use the data to benchmark their lending against peers, evaluate market share and competitive position, identify geographic and demographic gaps in their lending, and conduct internal fair lending self-assessments. HMDA data are central to Community Reinvestment Act compliance, supporting the analyses that depository institutions use to demonstrate they are serving the credit needs of their assessment areas. Lenders also use the data for strategic planning, branch siting, marketing, and product development decisions, drawing on the comprehensive picture of mortgage activity that HMDA provides across thousands of institutions and every census tract in the country.

Federal banking regulators and the Department of Justice use HMDA data to screen for potential violations of fair lending laws, including the Equal Credit Opportunity Act and the Fair Housing Act. The data allow analysts to compare approval rates, denial rates, and pricing across racial and ethnic groups, controlling for factors such as income and loan amount. HMDA data alone cannot establish discrimination, since the dataset does not include credit scores or other underwriting variables, but the data serve as a screening tool to identify institutions warranting further investigation. In October 2021, the Department of Justice launched the Combatting Redlining Initiative, a coordinated enforcement effort that relied on HMDA data to identify lenders whose lending patterns suggested they may have been avoiding majority-minority neighborhoods.

Community organizations use HMDA data to evaluate whether banks serve their neighborhoods and to support comments on bank merger applications under the Community Reinvestment Act. By comparing a bank's lending in low- and moderate-income areas to peers and to community demographics, organizations can identify underperformance and negotiate community benefits agreements that include increased lending commitments.

Researchers use HMDA data to study mortgage market trends, racial and ethnic disparities in lending, geographic patterns of credit access, and the effects of policy changes. The CFPB publishes annual data point articles analyzing HMDA data to identify market developments and potential fair lending concerns.

== Details of the law ==
Companies covered under HMDA are required to submit a Loan Application Register (LAR) to the FFIEC via the CFPB which acts as the HMDA processor. The LAR must contain the data outlined in the Filing Instruction Guide (FIG) for the relevant collection year for all covered applications or loans.

== Collection of HMDA data ==
For data from years prior to 2017 reporting institutions were required to submit their LARs by March 1 to the Federal Reserve Board on behalf of Federal Financial Institutions Examination Council (FFIEC), an interagency body empowered to administer HMDA. Pursuant to the Dodd–Frank Wall Street Reform and Consumer Protection Act, as of 2018 HMDA data was to be submitted to the Consumer Financial Protection Bureau via an online portal named the HMDA Platform. The first year of data submitted via this process was 2017.

The Dodd-Frank expanded the data fields collected under HMDA to provide better regulatory and public visibility into mortgage markets. Some changes include:

- the option for applicants and borrowers to self report race and ethnicity information in disaggregated format. The collection of race and ethnicity data requires a specific exemption from Regulation B, which implements the Equal Credit Opportunity Act (ECOA).
- other expanded demographic data
- expanded data on loan features and types
- use of Legal Entity Identifier (LEI) as a primary identifier for HMDA reporters
- use of Universal Loan Identifier (ULI), unless claiming partial exemption, that incorporates a check digit for accuracy
- changes in units of measure or enumerations to previously collected fields

On behalf of the FFIEC, the CFPB maintains a HMDA compliance guide that is publicly available and contains information on how and what to report in the data collection. Additional tools are made available by the FFIEC to facilitate compliance with Regulation C.

The Economic Growth, Regulatory Relief and Consumer Protection Act of 2018 allowed insured depository institutions and insured credit unions meeting certain loan-volume thresholds to claim partial exemptions from reporting certain data fields, provided their most recent Community Reinvestment Act examination ratings were not low.

== Data collected in the LAR ==
Contents of the HMDA data collection for 2017 and prior:

- The date of application
- The loan type (conventional loan, FHA loan, VA loan or a loan guaranteed by the Farmers Home Administration)
- The type of property involved (single-family, multifamily)
- The purpose of the loan (home purchase, home improvement, refinancing)
- Owner occupancy of the property (owner occupied or non-owner occupied)
- The loan amount
- Whether or not the application was a request for pre-approval
- The type of action taken (approved, denied, withdrawn, etc.)
- The date of action taken
- The location (state, county, MSA and census tract) of the property
- The ethnicity (Hispanic or non-Hispanic) of the borrower(s)
- The race of the borrower(s)
- The gender of the borrower(s)
- The gross annual income of the borrower(s)
- If the loan was subsequently sold in the secondary market, the type of entity that purchased it
- If the loan was denied, the reason why it was denied.
- Rate Spread (Rate Spread is the difference between the APR of the loan and the APOR for the week in which the interest rate was locked)
- If the loan is or is not subject to the Home Ownership and Equity Protection Act of 1994
- Lien status of the loan (1st or 2nd lien)

New or changed contents of the HMDA data collection for 2018 and onward:

- Credit score;
- NMLS Identification of the loan originator;
- Application channel;
- Applicant or co-applicant age;
- Combined loan-to-value (CLTV) ratio;
- Borrower's debt-to-income (DTI) ratio;
- Borrower-paid origination charges;
- Points and fees;
- Discount points;
- Lender credits;
- Loan term;
- Prepayment penalties;
- Non-amortizing loan features;
- Interest rate; and
- Rate spread for all loans.

== Publication of HMDA data and related products ==
HMDA data products are hosted on behalf of the FFIEC by the Federal Reserve Board for data HMDA collections for 2016 and prior and the CFPB for HMDA collections 2017 and later. Additionally, historic files prior to 2014 can be found at the National Archives and Records Administration (NARA) website. The NARA files include both Final and Ultimate datasets. The Final datasets include one year of resubmissions and late submissions by HMDA reporters and the Ultimate files contain two years of late and resubmitted data. NARA files include the statistical aggregates collected prior to 1990, the transaction level data collected in 1990 and onward, and the Aggregate and Disclosure reports produced from those data. The Aggregate and Disclosure reports were modified in 2018 due to changes in Regulation C.

In order to determine what transaction level data would be made public in the 2018 and onward HMDA collections, the CFPB used a balancing test method that weighed public utility of the data against potential for consumer harm. The application of the balancing test resulted in some fields being redacted and others being modified in order to protect applicant and borrower privacy.

HMDA datasets are published annually and include the Loan Application Register (LAR), Transmittal Sheet (TS), and Panel. The LAR contains transaction level data that were covered by Regulation C during the collection year. The LAR is one of the few datasets that contains application data as well as originated mortgages which allows calculation of denial rates and must be accounted for when analyzing HMDA data. The Transmittal Sheet contains self reported information related to HMDA reporters. The Panel is a compilation of regulatory data related to an institution that is used to profile HMDA reporters by peer group, such as by asset size, or by depository status and provide identifiers that link to other datasets, such as the CRA and the National Information Center. Initial dataset publications are referred to as the Modified LAR and are available on 3/31 of each calendar year. Later in the year additional datasets are published including the Snapshot, a point in time copy of HMDA of all three annual HMDA datasets, and Dynamic, TS and LAR files that are updated weekly.

The HMDA Data Browser was launched as an access tool for the 2018 and onward HMDA collections. The Data Browser allows filtering by geographic location, including State, MSA, and county, HMDA reporter, by LEI or name, and up to two additional data fields. The Data Browser also allows access via API.

== HMDA in fair lending analysis ==
HMDA data are central to fair lending analysis in the United States. The Department of Justice, the CFPB, and the federal banking regulators use HMDA to identify lenders whose denial rates, application patterns, geographic distribution, or pricing differ across racial, ethnic, or gender groups in ways that warrant investigation. The Combatting Redlining Initiative announced by the Department of Justice in October 2021 has used HMDA-based screens to identify targeted lenders, producing settlements with banks, non-bank mortgage companies, and a credit union for redlining majority-minority neighborhoods. Private litigants, state attorneys general, and community organizations also rely on HMDA in disparate-impact and disparate-treatment claims and in opposition filings on bank merger applications.

Analysts use HMDA to identify four categories of disparities: differences in denial rates across racial, ethnic, or gender groups; underrepresentation of protected groups among applicants, which may indicate discouragement; geographic patterns suggestive of redlining, in which an institution receives few applications from majority-minority neighborhoods relative to surrounding areas; and pricing disparities, in which protected groups receive higher-cost loans at disproportionate rates.

HMDA data do not include every underwriting variable a lender considers. The 2018 expansion of Regulation C added credit score, debt-to-income ratio, and combined loan-to-value fields to the data lenders report, though credit score is redacted from the public release under the CFPB's 2018 disclosure balancing test and is available only to regulators. HMDA-identified disparities therefore typically prompt targeted reviews of loan files and underwriting policies, with the combined evidence supporting fair lending findings, settlements, and litigation.
