= Mapping Prejudice =

Nonprofit organization based at University of Minnesota Libraries

- Founded: 2016; 10 years ago
- Purpose: identifies and maps racial covenants
- Location: Minneapolis, Minnesota, US
- Key people: Kirsten Delegard (Director); Penny Petersen (Property Records); Kevin Ehrman-Solberg (Co-Founder)
- Volunteers: 7,900
- Website: mappingprejudice.umn.edu

Mapping Prejudice is based at the John R. Borchert Map Library of the University of Minnesota Libraries. The project originally searched property records in Hennepin County, identified racial covenants that were made in order to stop non-Whites from purchasing certain properties, and plotted the results of them on digital maps.

Researchers think that although racial covenants were long understood as unjust, many white Americans came to view them as irrelevant historical artifacts after they were outlawed. However, as the 50th anniversary of the Fair Housing Act approached, the Mapping Prejudice team recognized that revisiting these documents could reveal how structural racism persisted in Minneapolis, foster public learning, and build momentum for meaningful housing justice.

Their focus began with Minneapolis. The project has grown to include Ramsey County, Minnesota; Milwaukee, Wisconsin; Dakota County, Minnesota; Stearns County, Minnesota, and Anoka County, Minnesota. Founded in 2016, Mapping Prejudice was inspired by work at universities in Seattle and Virginia.

== Process of making the map ==
The Mapping Prejudice project produced its dataset through a two-stage process that combined digital tools with sustained community involvement. In the first stage, the research team applied optical character recognition to millions of digitized property deeds to locate language that could indicate the presence of racially restrictive covenants. In the second stage, these flagged records were examined, verified, and transcribed by thousands of volunteers, most of them residents of the Twin Cities, who contributed through the Zooniverse platform. To recruit and support participants, the project hosted more than 200 in-person transcription sessions in partnership with neighborhood associations, churches, housing justice organizations, and local businesses. From 2016 to 2019, the team published regularly updated versions of the Hennepin County covenant map online, enabling volunteers to observe the project's development over time and reinforcing the project's commitment to transparency and community ownership.

== Awards received ==
The project, along with Hennepin County, received the 2021 Freedom of Information award from the Minnesota Coalition on Government Information (MNCOGI). In October 2025, Mapping Prejudice was recognized as a W. K. Kellogg Foundation Community Engagement Scholarship Award Exemplary Project. As of the award date, "over 11,000 students, faculty, staff, and community members have mapped over 50,000 racial covenants. Mapping Prejudice has transformed scholarly research by engaging community members in the creation of new knowledge of urban history in the United States."
