= People's Action =

U.S. progressive advocacy organization

- Formation: 2016
- Merger of: National People's Action, Alliance for a Just Society, USAction, Campaign for America's Future, Center for Health, Environment and Justice, Institute for America's Future
- Type: Political network
- Legal status: 501(c)(4)
- Purpose: Progressive political advocacy
- Headquarters: Chicago, Illinois
- Region served: United States
- Executive Director: Sulma Arias
- Website: peoplesaction.org
- Formerly called: National People's Action

People's Action is a national progressive advocacy and political organization in the United States made up of 40 organizations in 30 states. The group's stated goal is to "build the power of poor and working people, in rural, suburban, and urban areas to win change through issue campaigns and elections."

People's Action and the associated tax-exempt 501(c)(3) organization, People's Action Institute, were established in 2016 through a merger of three national networks of community organizing groups, National People's Action, the Alliance for a Just Society and USAction, as well as of organizations like the Campaign for America's Future and the Center for Health, Environment and Justice.

== National People's Action ==
National People's Action was a federation of 29 grassroots organizations in 18 states working together for racial and economic justice. Headquartered in Chicago, the organization was founded in 1972 by Austin neighborhood activist Gale Cincotta and professional organizer Shel Trapp.

=== History ===
Founded in 1972 by Cincotta and Trapp, the organization pushed for federal housing legislation including the Home Mortgage Disclosure Act of 1975, the Community Reinvestment Act of 1977, and the National Affordable Housing Act of 1990. For many years, Cincotta and Trapp offered training to the group's affiliates through their National Training and Information Center. The organization continued after the retirement of Trapp and the death of Cincotta in 2001, but refocused its efforts on organizing, issue campaigning, and direct action, de-emphasizing the training programs once offered through NTIC.

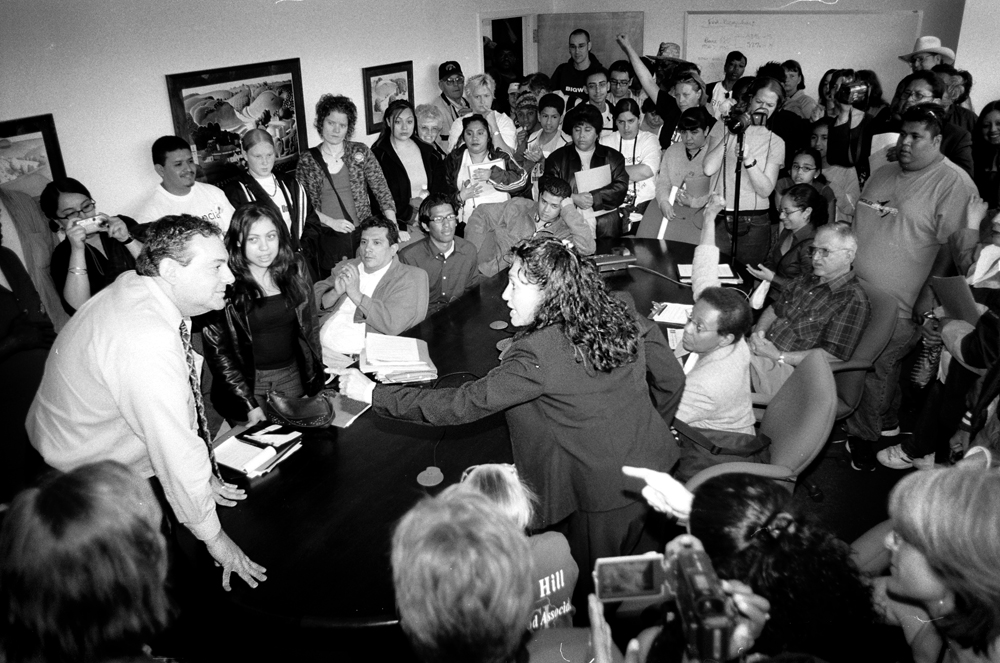
Emira Palacios

George Goehl has been the executive director since 2008.

=== Program ===
The organization conducted a series of "Showdown" events starting in October 2009. The events, dubbed "Showdown In America", "called for the end of corporate lobbying and too-big-to-fail financial institutions". According to the group, it existed as a network to create a society in which "racial and economic justice are realized in all aspects of society, resulting in more equity in work, housing, health, education, finance, and other systems central to people's well-being". The organization pushed for stricter regulations on lending and financial institutions, including increased taxes.

The organization has been part of the Democracy Initiative, a coalition including labor unions and environmentalist groups working to reverse what they saw as the takeover of American democracy by individual billionaires in collaboration with right-wing politicians.

In August 2018, People's Action sponsored 50 community cookouts across the country to emphasize the value of families.

=== Criticism ===
The organization was notable for aggressive tactics, especially protests against the residences of their opponents. Nina Easton of Fortune magazine wrote in her column about one such protest, at the home of her neighbor, a lawyer for Bank of America. In association with the Service Employees International Union, demonstrators trespassed on the executive's property, protesting while only his son was home, Easton said. Easton characterized the demonstration as "the politics of personal intimidation".
