= Community Reinvestment Act =

US federal law

- Other short titles: Indian and Alaska Native Community Development Act
- Long title: An Act to amend certain Federal laws pertaining to community development, housing, and related programs.
- Nicknames: Housing and Community Development Act of 1977
- Enacted by: the 95th United States Congress
- Effective: October 12, 1977

Citations
- Public law: 95-128
- Statutes at Large: 91 Stat. 1111

Codification
- Titles amended: 42 U.S.C.: Public Health and Social Welfare
- U.S.C. sections amended: 42 U.S.C. ch. 69 § 5301

Legislative history
- Introduced in the House as H.R. 6655 by Henry S. Reuss (D–WI) on April 26, 1977; Committee consideration by House Banking, Finance, and Urban Affairs, Senate Banking, Housing, and Urban Affairs; Passed the House on May 11, 1977 (369-20); Passed the Senate on June 7, 1977 (79-7, in lieu of S. 1523); Reported by the joint conference committee on September 26, 1977; agreed to by the Senate on October 1, 1977 (54-19) and by the House on October 4, 1977 (384-26); Signed into law by President Jimmy Carter on October 12, 1977

The Community Reinvestment Act (CRA, P.L. 95-128, 91 Stat. 1147, title VIII of the Housing and Community Development Act of 1977, 12 U.S.C. § 2901 et seq.) is a United States federal law designed to encourage commercial banks and savings associations to help meet the needs of borrowers in all segments of their communities, including low- and moderate-income neighborhoods. Congress passed the Act in 1977 to reduce discriminatory credit practices against low-income neighborhoods, a practice known as redlining.

The Act instructs the appropriate federal financial supervisory agencies to encourage regulated financial institutions to help meet the credit needs of the local communities in which they are chartered, consistent with safe and sound operation (Section 802). To enforce the statute, federal regulatory agencies examine banking institutions for CRA compliance, and take this information into consideration when approving applications for new bank branches or for mergers or acquisitions (Section 804).

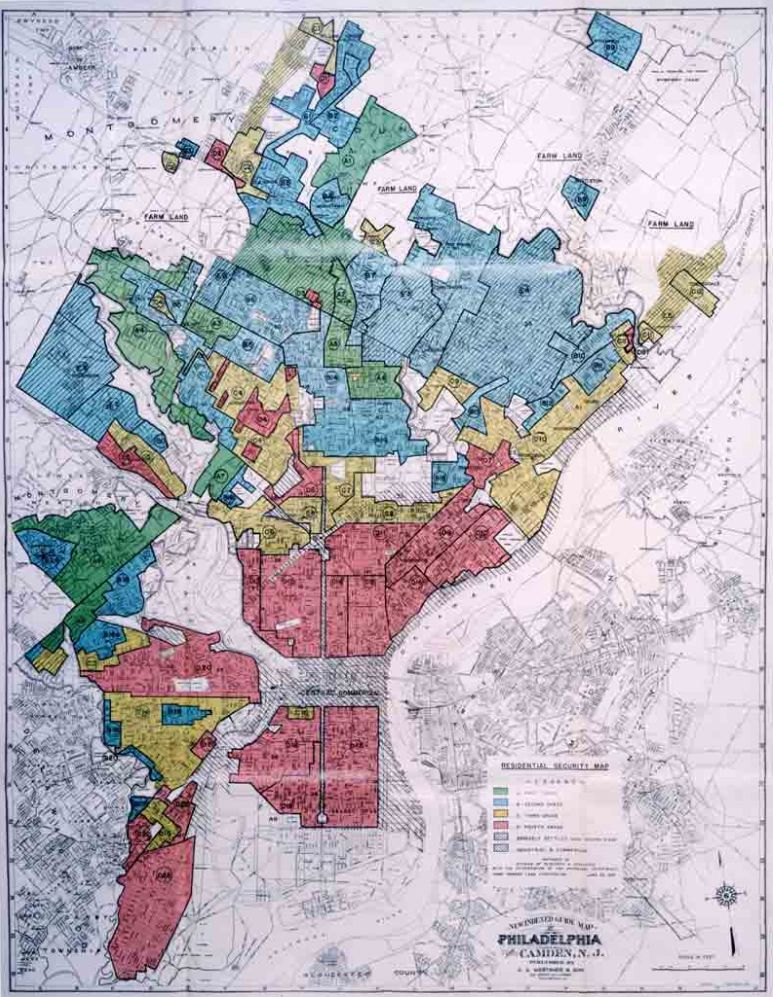
The CRA was passed to discourage redlining, a practice originally based on Home Owners' Loan Corporation "residential security maps", like this 1937 security map of Philadelphia.

== Enforcement ==
The Community Reinvestment Act of 1977 sought to address discrimination in loans made to individuals and businesses from low and moderate-income neighborhoods. The Act mandates that all banking institutions that receive Federal Deposit Insurance Corporation (FDIC) insurance be evaluated by Federal banking agencies to determine if the bank offers credit in a manner consistent with safe and sound operation (as per Section 802(b) and Section 804(1)) in all communities in which they are chartered to do business. The law does not list specific criteria for evaluating the performance of financial institutions. Rather, it directs that the evaluation process should accommodate the situation and context of each individual institution. Federal regulations dictate agency conduct in evaluating a bank's compliance in five performance areas, comprising twelve assessment factors. This examination culminates in a rating and a written report that becomes part of the supervisory record for that bank.

The law, however, emphasizes that an institution's CRA activities should be undertaken in a safe and sound manner, and does not require institutions to make high-risk loans that may bring losses to the institution. An institution's CRA compliance record is taken into account by the banking regulatory agencies when the institution seeks to expand through merger, acquisition or branching. The law does not mandate any other penalties for non-compliance with the CRA.

=== Regulations ===
The same banking agencies that are responsible for supervising depository institutions are also the agencies that conduct examinations for CRA compliance. These agencies are the Federal Reserve System (FRB), the FDIC, and the Office of the Comptroller of the Currency (OCC). In 1981, to help achieve the goals of the CRA, each of the Federal Reserve Banks established a Community Affairs Office to work with banking institutions and the public in identifying credit needs within the community and ways to address those needs.

Implementation of the CRA by these financial supervisory agencies is enacted by Title 12 of the Code of Federal Regulations (CFR); Parts 25, 228, 345, and 563e with the addition of Part 203 as it relates to sections of the Home Mortgage Disclosure Act (HMDA).

Table I. - Federal Agencies and the CRA's Corresponding CFR
Federal Financial Supervisory Agency	Code of Federal Regulations	e-CFR	Notes	1995	2005
Office of the Comptroller of the Currency (OCC)	12. C.F.R. Part 25. et seq.				
Federal Reserve System (FRB)	12. C.F.R. Part 228. et seq.				
Federal Reserve System (FRB)	12. C.F.R. Part 203. et seq.				
Federal Deposit Insurance Corporation (FDIC)	12. C.F.R. Part 345. et seq.				

The Federal Financial Institutions Examination Council (FFIEC) coordinates inter-agency information about the CRA. Information about the CRA ratings of individual banking institutions from the three responsible agencies (Federal Reserve, FDIC, and OCC), is publicly available from the website of the FFIEC. These ratings were first made available by the Clinton administration to enable public participation and public comment on CRA performance.

In addition to the regulatory framework in place, each federal financial supervisory agency's Inspector General performs regular audits on any regulatory changes made to see if the intended goals are actually being fulfilled.

== History ==
The original Act was passed by the 95th United States Congress and signed into law by President Jimmy Carter on October 12, 1977 (Pub.L. 95-128, 12 U.S.C. ch. 30). The CRA was passed as a result of national pressure to address the deteriorating conditions of American cities—particularly lower-income and minority neighborhoods.

Community activists, such as Gale Cincotta of National People's Action in Chicago, led the national fight to pass, and later to enforce the Act. Several legislative and regulatory revisions have since been enacted.

=== Original act ===
The CRA followed similar laws passed to reduce discrimination in the credit and housing markets including the Fair Housing Act of 1968, the Equal Credit Opportunity Act of 1974 and the Home Mortgage Disclosure Act of 1975 (HMDA). The Fair Housing Act and the Equal Credit Opportunity Act prohibit discrimination on the basis of race, sex, or other personal characteristics. The Home Mortgage Disclosure Act requires that financial institutions publicly disclose mortgage lending and application data. In contrast with those acts, the CRA seeks to ensure the provision of credit to all parts of a community, regardless of the relative wealth or poverty of a neighborhood.

Before the Act was passed, there were severe shortages of credit available to low- and moderate-income neighborhoods. In their 1961 report, the U.S. Commission on Civil Rights found that African-American borrowers were often required to make higher downpayments and adopt faster repayment schedules. The commission also documented blanket refusals to lend in particular areas (redlining).

The allegations of "redlining" certain neighborhoods originated with the Federal Housing Administration in the 1930s. The "residential security maps" created by the Home Owners' Loan Corporation (HOLC) for the FHA were used by private and public entities for years afterwards to withhold mortgage capital from neighborhoods that were deemed "unsafe". Contributory factors in the shortage of direct lending in low- and moderate-income communities were a limited secondary market for mortgages, informational problems to do with the lack of credit evaluations for lower-income borrowers, and lack of coordination among credit agencies.

In Congressional debate on the Act, critics charged that the law would create unnecessary regulatory burdens. Partly in response to these concerns, Congress included little prescriptive detail and simply directs the banking regulatory agencies to ensure that banks and savings associations serve the credit needs of their local communities in a safe and sound manner. Community groups only slowly organized to take advantage of their right under the Act to complain about law enforcement of the regulations.

=== Legislative revision history ===
The hidden table below lists the acts of Congress that affected the Community Reinvestment Act directly. The years in which the legislative revisions were made appear in bold text preceding the Public Laws that enacted them. The links to the codification and section notes may provide additional information about the legislative changes as well.

Housing and Community Development Act of 1977 − Title VIII
USC Title 12 − Chapter 30 − Community Reinvestment

SEC. 801. This title may be cited as the "Community Reinvestment Act of 1977"

Codified to 12. U.S.C. § 2901 →Note← | *short title citation found under section notes

[Source: Section 801 of title VIII of the Act of October 12, **1977** (Pub. L. No. 95–128; 91 Stat. 1147), effective October 12, 1977]

SEC. 802. Congressional Findings and Statement of Purpose

Codified to 12 U.S.C. § 2901 | notes

[Source: Section 802 of title VIII of the Act of October 12, **1977** (Pub. L. No. 95–128; 91 Stat. 1147), effective October 12, 1977]

SEC. 803. Definitions

Codified to 12. U.S.C. § 2902 | notes

[Source: Section 803 of title VIII of the Act of October 12, **1977** (Pub. L. No. 95–128; 91 Stat. 1147), effective October 12, 1977; as amended by section 1502 of title XV of the Act of November 10, **1978** (Pub. L. No. 95–630; 92 Stat. 3713), effective November 10, 1978; sections 744(q) of title VII and 1212(a) of title XII of the Act of August 9, **1989** (Pub. L. No. 101–73; 103 Stat. 440 and 526, respectively), effective August 9, 1989; and section 358(1) of title III of the Act of July 21, **2010**, (Pub. L. No. 111–203; 124 Stat. 1548), effective July 21, 2011]

SEC. 804. Financial Institutions; Evaluation

Codified to 12. U.S.C. § 2903 | notes

[Source: Section 804 of title VIII of the Act of October 12, **1977** (Pub. L. No. 95–128; 91 Stat. 1148), effective October 12, 1977; as amended by section 909(1) of title IX of the Act of October 28, **1992** (Pub. L. No. 102–550; 106 Stat. 3874), effective October 28, 1992; section 103(b) of title I of the Act of November 12, **1999** (Pub. L. No. 106–102; 113 Stat. 1351), effective March 12, 2000; section 1031(a) of title X of the Act of August 14, **2008** (Pub. L. No. 110–315; 122 Stat. 3488), effective August 14, 2008]

SEC. 805. Report to Congress

Codified to 12. U.S.C. § 2904 | notes

[Source: Section 805 of title VIII of the Act of October 12, **1977** (Pub. L. No. 95–128; 91 Stat. 1148), effective October 12, 1977]

SEC. 806. Regulations

Codified to 12. U.S.C. § 2905 | notes

[Source: Section 806 of title VIII of the Act of October 12, **1977** (Pub. L. No. 95–128; 91 Stat. 1148), effective October 12, 1977; as amended by section 358(2) of title III of the Act of July 21, **2010**, (Pub. L. No. 111–203; 124 Stat. 1548), effective July 21, 2011]

SEC. 807. Written Evaluations

Codified to 12. U.S.C. § 2906 | notes

[Source: Section 807 of title VIII of the Act of October 12, **1977** (Pub. L. No. 95–128; 91 Stat. 1147), effective October 12, 1977, as added by section 1212(b) of title XII of the Act of August 9, **1989** (Pub. L. No. 101–73; 103 Stat. 526), effective August 9, 1989; amended by section 222 of title II of the Act of December 19, **1991** (Pub. L. No. 102–242; 105 Stat. 2306), effective December 19, 1991; section 110 of title I of the Act of September 29, **1994** (Pub. L. No. 103–328; 108 Stat. 2364), effective September 29, 1994]

SEC. 808. Operation of Branch Facilities by Minorities and Women

Codified to 12. U.S.C. § 2907 | notes

[Source: Section 808 of title VIII of the Act of October 12, **1977** (Pub. L. No. 95–128; 91 Stat. 1147), effective October 12, 1977, as added by section 402(b) of title IV of the Act of December 12, **1991** (Pub. L. No. 102–233; 105 Stat. 1775), effective December 12, 1991; as amended by section 909(2) of title IX of the Act of October 28, **1992** (Pub. L. No. 102–550; 106 Stat. 3874), effective October 28, 1992]

SEC. 809. Small Bank Regulatory Relief

Codified to 12. U.S.C. § 2908 | notes

[Source: Section 809 of title VIII of the Act of October 12, **1977** (Pub. L. No. 95–128; 91 Stat. 1147), effective October 12, 1977, as added by section 712 of the Act of November 12, **1999** (Pub. L. No. 106–102; 113 Stat. 1469), effective November 12, 1999]

=== Legislative changes 1989 ===
The Financial Institutions Reform, Recovery and Enforcement Act of 1989 (FIRREA) was enacted by the 101st Congress and signed into law by President George H. W. Bush in the wake of the savings and loan crisis of the 1980s. As part of the subsequent general reform of the banking industry, FIRREA added section 807 (12. U.S.C. § 2906) to the existing CRA statutes in an effort to improve the area concerning insured depository institution examinations.

The new language now required the appropriate Federal regulatory agency to prepare a written evaluation after completing the examination of an institution's record in meeting the credit needs of its entire community, including any low- and moderate-income neighborhoods within it. These evaluation reports were divided into separate sections - one confidential; allowing the evaluated institution to retain its proprietary and personal information integrity at the same time the beginnings of the related databases were being compiled, and the other made public; intended to increase access and oversight of the CRS examination process. The public section introduced a four-tiered CRA examination rating system with performance levels of 'Outstanding', 'Satisfactory', 'Needs to Improve', or 'Substantial Noncompliance', each supplemented with a written synopsis of the agencies' evaluation reasoning using any available facts to support their conclusions.

According to Ben Bernanke, this law greatly increased the ability of advocacy groups, researchers, and other analysts to "perform more-sophisticated, quantitative analyses of banks' records", thereby influencing the lending policies of banks. Over time, community groups and nonprofit organizations established "more-formalized and more-productive partnerships with banks."

=== Legislative changes 1991 ===
Around the time of the introduction of the Federal Deposit Insurance Corporation Improvement Act of 1991 (FDICIA), the appropriate Federal regulatory agencies had reliably compiled enough institution examination data to warrant its inclusion in the public section of the written evaluations first established in 1989. With the passage of this Act in December 1991, section 807 (12. U.S.C. § 2906) was amended to require the inclusion of any examination data relevant in determining an institutions CRA rating as well.

A week earlier that same December, the existing CRA statute was amended once again upon the enactment of the Resolution Trust Corporation Refinancing, Restructuring, and Improvement Act of 1991. It allowed the Resolution Trust Corporation (RTC) to make available any branch of any savings association located in any predominantly minority neighborhoods that the RTC had been appointed the conservator or receiver of any minority depository institution or women's depository institution with favorable conditions. Upon the addition of section 808 (12. U.S.C. § 2907) to the existing CRA statutes by the Act, any depository institution which donated, sold with favorable terms (as determined by the appropriate Federal financial supervisory agency), or made available on a rent-free basis any branch of such institutions located in any predominantly minority neighborhood to any minority depository institution or women's depository institution, the amount of the contribution or the amount of the loss incurred in connection with such activity would go towards meeting the credit needs of the institution's community and would be taken into consideration when CRA examinations were evaluated.

=== Legislative changes 1992 ===
Although minor amendments were made directly to the Community Reinvestment Act concerning the consideration of minority and female owned institutions & partnerships during evaluations first established in 1991, other portions of the Federal Housing Enterprises Financial Safety and Soundness Act of 1992 indirectly affected the CRA practices at the time in requiring Fannie Mae and Freddie Mac, the two government sponsored enterprises that purchase and securitize mortgages, to devote a percentage of their lending to support affordable housing.

=== Legislative changes 1994 ===
The Riegle-Neal Interstate Banking and Branching Efficiency Act of 1994, which repealed restrictions on interstate banking, listed the Community Reinvestment Act ratings received by the out-of-state bank as a consideration when determining whether to allow interstate branches.

According to Bernanke, a surge in bank merger and acquisition activities followed the passing of the act, and advocacy groups increasingly used the public comment process to protest bank applications on Community Reinvestment Act grounds. When applications were highly contested, federal agencies held public hearings to allow public comment on the bank's lending record. In response many institutions established separate business units and subsidiary corporations to facilitate CRA-related lending. Local and regional public-private partnerships and multi-bank loan consortia were formed to expand and manage such CRA-related lending.

=== Regulatory changes 1995 ===
In July 1993, President Bill Clinton asked regulators to reform the CRA in order to make examinations more consistent, clarify performance standards, and reduce cost and compliance burden.

Robert Rubin, the Assistant to the President for Economic Policy, under President Clinton, explained that this was in line with President Clinton's strategy to "deal with the problems of the inner city and distressed rural communities". Discussing the reasons for the Clinton administration's proposal to strengthen the CRA and further reduce red-lining, Lloyd Bentsen, Secretary of the Treasury at that time, affirmed his belief that availability of credit should not depend on where a person lives, "The only thing that ought to matter on a loan application is whether or not you can pay it back, not where you live." Bentsen said that the proposed changes would "make it easier for lenders to show how they're complying with the Community Reinvestment Act", and "cut back a lot of the paperwork and the cost on small business loans".

By early 1995, the proposed CRA regulations were substantially revised to address criticisms that the regulations, and the agency's implementation of them through the examination process to date, were too process-oriented, burdensome, and not sufficiently focused on actual results. The CRA examination process itself was reformed to incorporate the pending changes. Information about banking institutions' CRA ratings was made available via web page for public review as well. The Office of the Comptroller of the Currency (OCC) also moved to revise its regulation structure allowing lenders subject to the CRA to claim community development loan credits for loans made to help finance the environmental cleanup or redevelopment of industrial sites when it was part of an effort to revitalize the low- and moderate-income community where the site was located.

During one of the Congressional hearings addressing the proposed changes in 1995, William A. Niskanen, chair of the Cato Institute, criticized both the 1993 and 1994 sets of proposals for political favoritism in allocating credit, for micromanagement by regulators and for the lack of assurances that banks would not be expected to operate at a loss to achieve CRA compliance. He predicted the proposed changes would be very costly to the economy and the banking system in general. Niskanen believed that the primary long-term effect would be an artificial contraction of the banking system. Niskanen recommended Congress repeal the Act.

Niskanen's, and other respondents to the proposed changes, voiced their concerns during the public comment & testimony periods in late 1993 through early 1995. In response to the aggregate concerns recorded by then, the Federal financial supervisory agencies (the OCC, FRB, FDIC, and OTS) made further clarifications relating to definition, assessment, ratings and scope; sufficiently resolving many of the issues raised in the process. The agencies jointly reported their final amended regulations for implementing the Community Reinvestment Act in the Federal Register on May 4, 1995. The final amended regulations replaced the existing CRA regulations in their entirety. (See the notes in the "1995" column of Table I. for the specifics)

=== Legislative changes 1999 ===
In 1999 the Congress enacted and President Clinton signed into law the Gramm-Leach-Bliley Act, also known as the Financial Services Modernization Act. This law repealed the part of the Glass–Steagall Act that had prohibited a bank from offering a full range of investment, commercial banking, and insurance services since its enactment in 1933. A similar bill was introduced in 1998 by Senator Phil Gramm but it was unable to complete the legislative process into law. Resistance to enacting the 1998 bill, as well as the subsequent 1999 bill, centered around the legislation's language which would expand the types of banking institutions of the time into other areas of service but would not be subject to CRA compliance in order to do so. The Senator also demanded full disclosure of any financial "deals" which community groups had with banks, accusing such groups of "extortion".

In the fall of 1999, Senators Dodd and Schumer prevented another impasse by securing a compromise between Sen. Gramm and the Clinton Administration by agreeing to amend the Federal Deposit Insurance Act (12 U.S.C. ch. 16) to allow banks to merge or expand into other types of financial institutions. The FDIC related provisions of the new Gramm-Leach-Bliley Act, along with the addition of sub-section § 2903(c) directly to Title 12, insured any bank holding institution wishing to be re-designated as a financial holding institution by the Board of Governors of the Federal Reserve System would also have to follow Community Reinvestment Act compliance guidelines before any merger or expansion could take effect.

At the same time the G-L-B Act's changes to the Federal Deposit Insurance Act would now allow for bank expansions into new lines of business, non-affiliated groups entering into agreements with these bank or financial institutions would also have to be reported as outlined under the newly added section to Title 12, § 1831y (CRA Sunshine Requirements), to satisfy Gramm's concerns.

In conjunction with the Gramm-Leach-Bliley Act changes, smaller banks would be reviewed less frequently for CRA compliance by the addition of §2908. (Small Bank Regulatory Relief) directly to Chapter 30, (the existing CRA laws), itself. The 1999 Act also mandated two studies to be conducted in connection with the "Community Reinvestment Act":

- the first report by the Federal Reserve, to be delivered to Congress by March 15, 2000, is a comprehensive study of CRA to focus on default and delinquency rates, and the profitability of loans made in connection with CRA;
- the second report to be conducted by the Treasury Department over the next two years, is intended to determine the impact of the Act on the provision of services to low- and moderate-income neighborhoods and people, as intended by CRA.

On signing the Gramm-Leach-Bliley Act, President Clinton said that it, "establishes the principles that, as we expand the powers of banks, we will expand the reach of the [Community Reinvestment] Act".

=== Regulatory changes 2005 ===
In 2002 there was an inter-agency review of the effectiveness of the 1995 regulatory changes to the Community Reinvestment Act and new proposals were considered. In 2003, researchers at the Federal Reserve Bank of New York noted that dramatic changes in the financial services landscape had weakened the CRA, and that in 2003 less than 30 percent of all home purchase loans were subject to intensive review under the CRA.

In early 2005, the Office of Thrift Supervision (OTS) implemented new rules that – among other changes – allowed thrifts with over $1 billion in assets to tweak the long-standing 50-25-25 CRA ratings thresholds by continuing to meet 50 percent of their overall CRA rating through lending activity as always but the other 50 percent could be any combination of lending, investment, and services that the thrift wanted. The obligations to adhere to 25 percent for services and 25 percent for investments became optional and the means to securing a satisfactory CRA rating was left to the discretion of the qualifying thrifts instead (See the notes in the "2005" column of Table I. for the specifics).

In April 2005, a contingent of Democratic Congressmen led by Representative Barney Frank issued a letter protesting these changes, saying they undercut the ability of the CRA to "meet the needs of low and moderate-income persons and communities". The changes were also opposed by community groups concerned that it would weaken the CRA.

After enacting a technical regulatory amendment in the interim incorporating a different formula for stratifying both metropolitan and rural zones to better align with an expanded definition of them under the CRA in the process, the Federal Deposit Insurance Corporation (FDIC), the Board of Governors of the Federal Reserve System (FRB), and the Office of the Comptroller of the Currency (OCC) also put a new set of regulations into effect in September 2005 - mirroring much of what the OTS had already initiated earlier in the year (See the notes in the "2005" column of Table I for specifics). These regulations also included less restrictive definitions of "small" and "intermediate small" banks. "Intermediate small banks" were defined as banks with assets of less than $1 billion but more than $250 million, which allowed these banks to opt for examination as either as a small bank or a large bank. Currently banks with assets greater than $1.061 billion have their CRA performance evaluated according to lending, investment and service tests. The agencies use the Consumer Price Index to adjust the asset size thresholds for small and large institutions annually.

=== Regulatory changes 2007 ===
The Office of Thrift Supervision (OTS) proposed revising and started to solicit public comment regarding the complete alignment of its CRA rule with the CRA rules of the other three federal banking agencies in November 2006. The agency referenced several factors for the proposed realignment, in particular, that a consistent CRA standard applied to both the banking and the thrift industries would facilitate objective evaluations of CRA performance; ensure accurate assessments of banks and thrifts that operated in the same markets; and permit the public to make reasonable comparisons of bank and thrift CRA performance.

OTS Director at the time, John Reich announced the final decision to go ahead and implement the proposed revisions in four main areas of its existing Community Reinvestment Act (CRA) regulations to reestablish uniformity between its rules and those of the other federal banking agencies. Reaffirming the basis for the revised rules as first proposed, Reich stated, "OTS is making these revisions to promote consistency and facilitate objective evaluations of CRA performance across the banking and thrift industries. Consistent standards will allow the public to make more effective comparisons of bank and thrift CRA performance." He noted the changes reinforce CRA objectives consistent with thrifts' performance in meeting the financial services needs of their communities.

This OTS rule revision aligned with that of the other agencies by:

1. eliminating the option of alternative weights for lending, investment, and service under the large, retail savings association test;
2. defining institutions with assets between $250 million and $1 billion as "intermediate small savings associations" subject to a new community development test;
3. indexing the asset threshold for "small" and "intermediate small" savings associations annually based on changes to the Consumer Price Index (CPI); and
4. clarifying the adverse impact on a savings association's CRA rating where the OTS finds evidence of discrimination or other illegal credit practices.

These four changes generally mirror the ones made by the other three federal agencies in late 2005. The agency noted that latitude would be provided for a short period of time to institutions in the context of examinations conducted after the effective date, July 1, 2007, in order to implement program changes under the new rule smoothly.

=== Legislative changes 2008 ===
With the passage of the Higher Education Opportunity Act into law, Pub. L. 110–315 (text) (PDF), on August 14, 2008, each appropriate Federal financial supervisory agency shall now consider, as a factor in assessing and taking into account the record of a financial institution's CRA compliance, any & all low-cost education loans provided by the financial institution to low-income borrowers. All the affected Federal financial supervisory agencies have one year after the date of enactment to issue rules in final form to implement the change into the Code of Federal Regulations (CFR) according to Title X, Subtitle C, Section 1031 of the Act.

=== CRA reform proposals ===
In 2007, Ben Bernanke suggested further increasing the presence of Fannie Mae and Freddie Mac in the affordable housing market to help banks fulfill their CRA obligations by providing them with more opportunities to securitize CRA-related loans.

On February 13, 2008, the United States House Committee on Financial Services held a hearing on the Community Reinvestment Act's impact on the provision of loans, investments and services to under-served communities and its effectiveness. There were 15 witnesses from government and the private sector.

On April 15, 2008, an FDIC official told the same committee that the FDIC was exploring offering incentives for banks to offer low-cost alternatives to payday loans. Doing so would allow them favorable consideration under their Community Reinvestment Act responsibilities. It had recently begun a two-year pilot project with an initial group of 31 banks.

Congresswoman Eddie Bernice Johnson introduced new legislation, the Community Reinvestment Modernization Act of 2009, on March 12, 2009, to expand the scope of CRA to include non-bank financial institutions, such as credit unions. There were other attempts to legislatively "modernize" the Community Reinvestment Act in previous sessions of Congress, such as in 2000 / 2001 and 2007, among others. The United States House Committee on Financial Services held hearings on September 16, 2009 on "Proposals to Modernize the Community Reinvestment Act" with 10 witnesses, including Johnson. Another hearing was held on April 15, 2010 on "Perspectives and Proposals on the Community Reinvestment Act" with eight witnesses.

On June 24, 2010, the Office of the Comptroller of the Currency (OCC), Federal Reserve System, Federal Deposit Insurance Corporation (FDIC), and the Office of Thrift Supervision (OTS) jointly published proposed revisions to the rules implementing the Community Reinvestment Act. These agencies, with the National Credit Union Administration (NCUA), make up the Federal Financial Institutions Examination Council (FFIEC), which coordinates regulation of financial institutions, including implementation of the Community Reinvestment Act. The proposed revisions to CRA rules are intended to revise the term "community development" to "include loans, investments and services that support, enable or facilitate projects or activities" that meet the criteria described in the Housing and Economic Recovery Act of 2008 (HERA) and are conducted in designated target areas identified under the Neighborhood Stabilization Program established by HERA and the American Recovery and Reinvestment Act of 2009 (ARRA). Among other things, this would expand the range of persons served to include middle-income households.

In 2009, The Federal Reserve Banks of Boston and San Francisco published Revisiting the CRA: Perspectives on the Future of the Community Reinvestment Act, which assembles views from a wide range of academic researchers, regulators, community development practitioners and financial service industry representatives on how to improve the CRA going forward.

The Obama administration has increased scrutiny of the provision of credit to poor and African American neighborhoods. Lenders have come under investigation for not operating in such areas, whether they have halted service there or have never operated in them before. Former Atlantic associate editor Daniel Indiviglio attributes increasing noncompliance with the CRA to the tightening of lending requirements.

In 2020, the OCC proposed a final rule for CRA that was billed as an attempt to modernize the act to keep with changes in the financial sector, particularly the growth of digital banking. It did this unilaterally without support from the FDIC and the Federal Reserve.

Community groups were also opposed to the 2020 proposal. Led by the National Community Reinvestment Coalition (NCRC), 1,594 or 83% of the 1,922 unique comments submitted disagreed with the OCC’s rule; 674 of those comments cited NCRC or used some of the organization’s suggested language. An additional 10,000 comments from individuals, submitted through an online petition campaign, also supported NCRC’s point of view.

Despite this opposition, the OCC published the final rule in 2020. Immediately after, NCRC and the California Reinvestment Coalition (CRC), represented by Democracy Forward and Farella Braun + Martel, filed a lawsuit seeking to vacate the OCC’s CRA rule, claiming that it violated the Administrative Procedure Act and was finalized without sufficient data to support the revisions. In February 2020, a federal judge rejected the OCC’s attempt to dismiss the lawsuit, a key hurdle in moving the claim forward.

In January 2021, with the inauguration of President Joe Biden, the OCC went under new leadership, and on December 14, 2021, the OCC fully rescinded its 2020 CRA rule.

Community groups submitted a position paper on March 1, 2022, to the OCC, FDIC and Federal Reserve about the key reforms they wanted to see. These included a consideration of race on CRA exams, more objective measures of performance that reduce ratings inflation, and expanded CRA assessment areas that include not only where banks have branches but also areas with significant amounts of bank lending and/or deposit activity.

The groups also recommended that CRA be expanded to apply throughout the financial sector, beyond banks. This would require Congressional legislation, but there were precedents in state CRA laws that apply to mortgage companies and credit unions, not just banks.

New regulations with the support of consumer advocates were proposed in October 2023, that would count online loans to target demographics regardless of geographic location. These were the subject of a lawsuit by the American Bankers Association.

== Criticisms ==
=== Effectiveness ===
The first major research study of CRA was the 1993 book Community Reinvestment Performance (1993, Probus Publishing) by Kenneth H. Thomas, Ph.D., a Finance Lecturer at The Wharton School of the University of Pennsylvania. The main conclusion of the book, which was based on an analysis of the results of 6,706 CRA exams, was that the law was needed and it works but it must be improved, mainly through better and more objective enforcement to avoid "CRA Grade Inflation". Many of the recommendations in that book were included in the 1995 CRA reform. The CRA Handbook (1998, McGraw Hill) carefully examined over 1,500 CRA exams under the 1995 reforms and identified further CRA Grade Inflation and made specific recommendations to improve the law's effectiveness, primarily through more objective and quantifiable standards.

Some economists have questioned if the CRA was – or at least had become – irrelevant, because it was not needed to encourage banks to make profitable loans to a variety of borrowers. In a 2003 research paper, economists at the Federal Reserve could not find clear evidence that the CRA increased lending and home ownership more in low income neighborhoods than in higher income ones. A 2008 Competitive Enterprise Institute study resulted in a similar finding.

Former Federal Reserve chair Ben Bernanke has stated that an underlying assumption of the CRA – that more lending equals better outcomes for local communities – may not always be true, pointing to "recent problems in mortgage markets". However, he notes that at least in some instances, "the CRA has served as a catalyst, inducing banks to enter under-served markets that they might otherwise have ignored".

The Woodstock Institute, a Chicago-based policy and advocacy nonprofit, found in an analysis of 1996 Chicago-area survey data that low income areas still lagged behind in access to commercial loans. Most small business loans made by CRA regulated banks went to higher income areas; 16.6% in low-income areas, 18.4% in low- and moderate-income tracts; 21.8% in middle-income areas and 23.1% in upper-income areas.

In a 1998 paper, Alex Schwartz of the Fannie Mae Foundation found that CRA agreements were "consistently successful in meeting their goals for mortgages, investments in low-income housing tax credits, grant giving to community-based organizations, and in opening (and keeping open) inner-city bank branches." In a 2000 report for the US Treasury, several economists concluded that the CRA had the intended impact of improving access to credit for minority and low-to-moderate-income consumers.

In a 2005 paper for the New York University Law Review, Michael S. Barr, professor at the University of Michigan Law School, presented evidence to demonstrate that the CRA had overcome market failures to increase access to credit for low-income, moderate-income, and minority borrowers at relatively low cost. He contends that the CRA is justified, has resulted in progress, and should be continued.

Speaking to the February 2008 Congressional Committee on Financial Services hearing on the CRA, Sandra L. Thompson, Director of the Division of Supervision and Consumer Protection at the FDIC, lauded the positive impact of CRA, noting that, "studies have pointed to increases in lending to low- and moderate-income customers and minorities in the decades since the CRA's passage." She cited a study by the Joint Center for Housing Studies at Harvard University, that found that "data for 1993 through 2000 show home purchase lending to low- and moderate-income people living in low- and moderate-income neighborhoods grew by 94 percent – more than in any of the other income categories".

In his statement before the same hearing, New York University economics professor Larry White stated that regulator efforts to "lean on" banks in vague and subjective ways to make loans is an "inappropriate instrument for achieving those goals". In a world of national banking enterprises, these policies are more likely to drive institutions out of neighborhoods. He stated that better ways to accomplish the goals would be vigorous enforcement of anti-discrimination laws, of antitrust laws to promote competition, and federal funding of worthy projects directly through an "on-budget and transparent process" like the Community Development Financial Institutions Fund.

According to a 2012 study "credit markets enabled a substantial fraction of Hispanic families to live in neighbourhoods with fewer black families, even though a substantial fraction of black families were moving to more racially integrated areas. The net effect is that credit markets increased racial segregation".

Politico has reported that the Community Reinvestment Act may sometimes push poor people out of their own neighborhoods by facilitating investment by outsiders.

=== Sound practices and profitability ===
According to a 2000 United States Department of the Treasury study of lending trends in 305 U.S. cities between 1993 and 1998, $467 billion in mortgage credit flowed from CRA-covered lenders to low- and medium-income borrowers and areas. In that period, the total number of loans to poorer Americans by CRA-eligible institutions rose by 39% while loans to wealthier individuals by CRA-covered institutions rose by 17%. The share of total US lending to low and medium income borrowers rose from 25% in 1993 to 28% in 1998 as a consequence.

Responding to concerns that the CRA would lower bank profitability, a 1997 research paper by economists at the Federal Reserve found that "[CRA] lenders active in lower-income neighborhoods and with lower-income borrowers appear to be as profitable as other mortgage-oriented commercial banks".

Concerns at the time over the 1995 regulatory change causing an increase in the inability of financial institutions to expand through mergers or acquisition due to regulatory denial based on poor CRA compliance were unfounded. Over the 1993-97 period, one regulatory agency, the Federal Reserve Board, actually approved more applications than the average percentages of those without a detailed CRA review taking place. Of the 1,100 merger or acquisition cases the FRB reviewed on average per year where the relevant institutions were subject to CRA, only 70 instances on average were identified with potential CRA problems regardless of public opposition or internal reporting raising the concern. On average, 22 of these were ultimately identified as CRA compliance being the primary reason for both application withdrawal or FRB denial.

In October 1997, First Union Capital Markets and Bear, Stearns & Co launched the first publicly available securitization of Community Reinvestment Act loans, issuing $384.6 million of such securities. The securities were guaranteed by Freddie Mac and had an implied "AAA" rating. The public offering was several times oversubscribed, predominantly by money managers and insurance companies who were not buying them for CRA credit.

In October 2000, to expand the secondary market for affordable community-based mortgages and to increase liquidity for CRA-eligible loans, Fannie Mae committed to purchase and securitize $2 billion of "MyCommunityMortgage" loans. In November 2000 Fannie Mae announced that the Department of Housing and Urban Development ("HUD") would soon require it to dedicate 50% of its business to low- and moderate-income families." It stated that since 1997 Fannie Mae had done nearly $7 billion in CRA business with depository institutions, but its goal was $20 billion. In 2001 Fannie Mae announced that it had acquired $10 billion in specially-targeted Community Reinvestment Act (CRA) loans more than one and a half years ahead of schedule, and announced its goal to finance over $500 billion in CRA business by 2010, about one third of loans anticipated to be financed by Fannie Mae during that period.

Speaking in 2007, the 30th anniversary of the CRA, Ben Bernanke, Chair of the Federal Reserve System since 2006, stated that the high costs of gathering information, "may have created a 'first-mover' problem, in which each financial institution has an incentive to let one of its competitors be the first to enter an underserved market". Bernanke notes that at least in some instances, "the CRA has served as a catalyst, inducing banks to enter underserved markets that they might otherwise have ignored". In the same 2007 speech, Bernanke also noted that, "managers of financial institutions found that these loan portfolios, if properly underwritten and managed, could be profitable" and that the loans "usually did not involve disproportionately higher levels of default".

=== Housing advocacy groups ===
CRA regulations give community groups the right to comment on or protest banks' purported non-compliance with CRA. Such comments could help or hinder banks' planned expansions. Groups at first only slowly took advantage of these rights. Regulatory changes during the Clinton administration allowed these community groups better access to CRA information and enabled them to increase their activities.

In an article for the New York Post, economist Stan Liebowitz wrote that community activists' intervention at yearly bank reviews resulted in their obtaining large amounts of money from banks, since poor reviews could lead to frustrated merger plans and even legal challenges by the Justice Department. Michelle Minton noted that Chase Manhattan and J.P. Morgan donated hundreds of thousands of dollars to ACORN around the same time they were to apply for permission to merge and needed to comply with CRA regulations.

According to The New York Times, some of these housing advocacy groups provided early warnings about the potential impact of lowered credit standards and the resulting unsupportable increase in real estate values they were causing in low to moderate income communities. Ballooning mortgages on rental properties threatened to require large rent increases from low and moderate income tenants that could ill afford them.

According to Inner City Press, "Bronx-based Fair Finance Watch commented to the Federal Reserve about the practices of now-defunct non-bank subprime lender New Century, when U.S. Bancorp bought warrants for 24% of New Century's stock. The Fed, rather than take any action on New Century, merely waited until U.S. Bancorp sold off some of the warrants, and then said the issue was moot." However, subprime loans were so profitable, that they were aggressively marketed in low-and moderate-income communities, even over the objections and warnings of housing advocacy groups like ACORN.

=== Predatory lending ===
In a 2002 study exploring the relationship between the CRA and lending looked at as predatory, Kathleen C. Engel and Patricia A. McCoy noted that banks could receive CRA credit by lending or brokering loans in lower-income areas that would be considered a risk for ordinary lending practices. CRA regulated banks may also inadvertently facilitate these lending practices by financing lenders. They noted that CRA regulations, as then administered and carried out by Fannie Mae and Freddie MAC, did not penalize banks that engaged in these lending practices. They recommended that the federal agencies use the CRA to sanction behavior that either directly or indirectly increased predatory lending practices by lowering the CRA rating of any bank that facilitated in these lending practices.

The FDIC has tried to address this issue by "stopping abusive practices through the examination process and supervisory actions; encouraging banks to serve all members and areas of their communities fairly; and providing information and financial education to help consumers make informed choices". FDIC policy currently states that "predatory lending can have a negative effect on a bank's CRA performance."

Competition also played a part in lending practices. In order to gain market share lenders lowered their standards.

=== Relationship to the 2008 financial crisis ===
Economist Stan Liebowitz wrote in the New York Post that a strengthening of the CRA in the 1990s encouraged a loosening of lending standards throughout the banking industry. He charged the Federal Reserve with ignoring the negative impact of the CRA. According to Manhattan Institute scholar Howard Husock, the CEO of a midsize bank reported that 20% of his institution's CRA-related mortgages were delinquent in their first year and probably 7% would end in foreclosure. In a commentary for CNN, Congressman Ron Paul, who serves on the United States House Committee on Financial Services, charged the CRA with "forcing banks to lend to people who normally would be rejected as bad credit risks." In a The Wall Street Journal opinion piece, economist Russell Roberts wrote that the CRA subsidized low-income housing by pressuring banks to serve poor borrowers and poor regions of the country.

Other economists have examined the issue and concluded that the CRA did not contribute to the 2008 financial crisis, notably economist Paul Krugman, Tim Westrich of the Center for American Progress, Robert Gordon of the American Prospect, Ellen Seidman of the New America Foundation, Daniel Gross of Slate, Dean Baker of The Center For Economic and Policy Research, and Aaron Pressman from BusinessWeek. Law professor Michael S. Barr, a Treasury Department official under President Clinton, stated that approximately 50% of subprime loans were made by independent mortgage companies that were not regulated by the CRA, and another 25% to 30% came from only partially CRA regulated bank subsidiaries and affiliates. Barr noted that institutions fully regulated by CRA made "perhaps one in four" sub-prime loans, and that "the worst and most widespread abuses occurred in the institutions with the least federal oversight".

According to American Enterprise Institute fellow Edward Pinto, Bank of America reported in 2008 that its CRA portfolio, which constituted 7% of its owned residential mortgages, was responsible for 29 percent of its losses. He charged that "approximately 50 percent of CRA loans for single-family residences ... [had] characteristics that indicated high credit risk", yet, per the standards used by the various government agencies to evaluate CRA performance at the time, were not counted as "subprime" because borrower credit worthiness was not considered. Krugman argues that Pinto's category of "other high-risk mortgages" incorrectly includes loans that were not high-risk, that instead were like traditional conforming mortgages. Gene Epstein of Barron's disputed Krugman's claims and those of the article he cited as erroneous and misleading. Another CRA critic, Joseph Fried, concedes that "some of this CRA subprime lending might have taken place, even in the absence of CRA. For that reason, the direct impact of CRA on the volume of subprime lending is not certain." A study by the economists, Agarwal, Benmelich, and Bergman, found that banks undergoing CRA-related regulatory exams took additional mortgage lending risk.

The Financial Crisis Inquiry Commission formed by the US Congress in 2009 to investigate the causes of the 2008 financial crisis, concluded "the CRA was not a significant factor in subprime lending or the crisis". Ben Bernanke, then Chairman of the Federal Reserve, wrote that experience and research contradict "the charge that CRA was at the root of, or otherwise contributed in any substantive way to, the current mortgage difficulties." Government economists and officials, including Janet Yellen, then President and CEO of the Federal Reserve Bank of San Francisco, FDIC Chair Sheila Bair, Comptroller of the Currency John C. Dugan, and Federal Reserve Governor Randall Kroszner, also hold that the CRA did not significantly contribute to the subprime crisis. According to Yellen, former Chair of the Federal Reserve, independent mortgage companies made risky "higher-priced" loans at more than twice the rate of the banks and thrifts; most CRA loans were responsibly made, and were not the "higher-priced" loans that have contributed to the current crisis. During a 2008 House Committee on Oversight and Government Reform hearing on the role of Fannie Mae and Freddie Mac in the 2008 financial crisis, including in relation to the Community Reinvestment Act, when asked if the CRA provided the "fuel" for increasing subprime loans, former Fannie Mae CEO Franklin Raines said it might have been a catalyst encouraging bad behavior, but it was difficult to know. Raines also cited information that only a small percentage of risky loans originated as a result of the CRA.

In 2015, Federal Reserve Board economists Neil Bhutta and Daniel Ringo published a summary of available studies on the issue. They concluded that "CRA-related loans were a small fraction of the subprime market during the mortgage boom", and hence it was not a significant contributor to the 2008 financial crisis.

== See also ==
- Fannie Mae
- Freddie Mac
- Federal Housing Administration
- Housing and Community Development Act of 1987
- Housing and Community Development Act of 1992
