= Resolution Trust Corporation =

U.S. government-owned asset management firm (1989–1995)

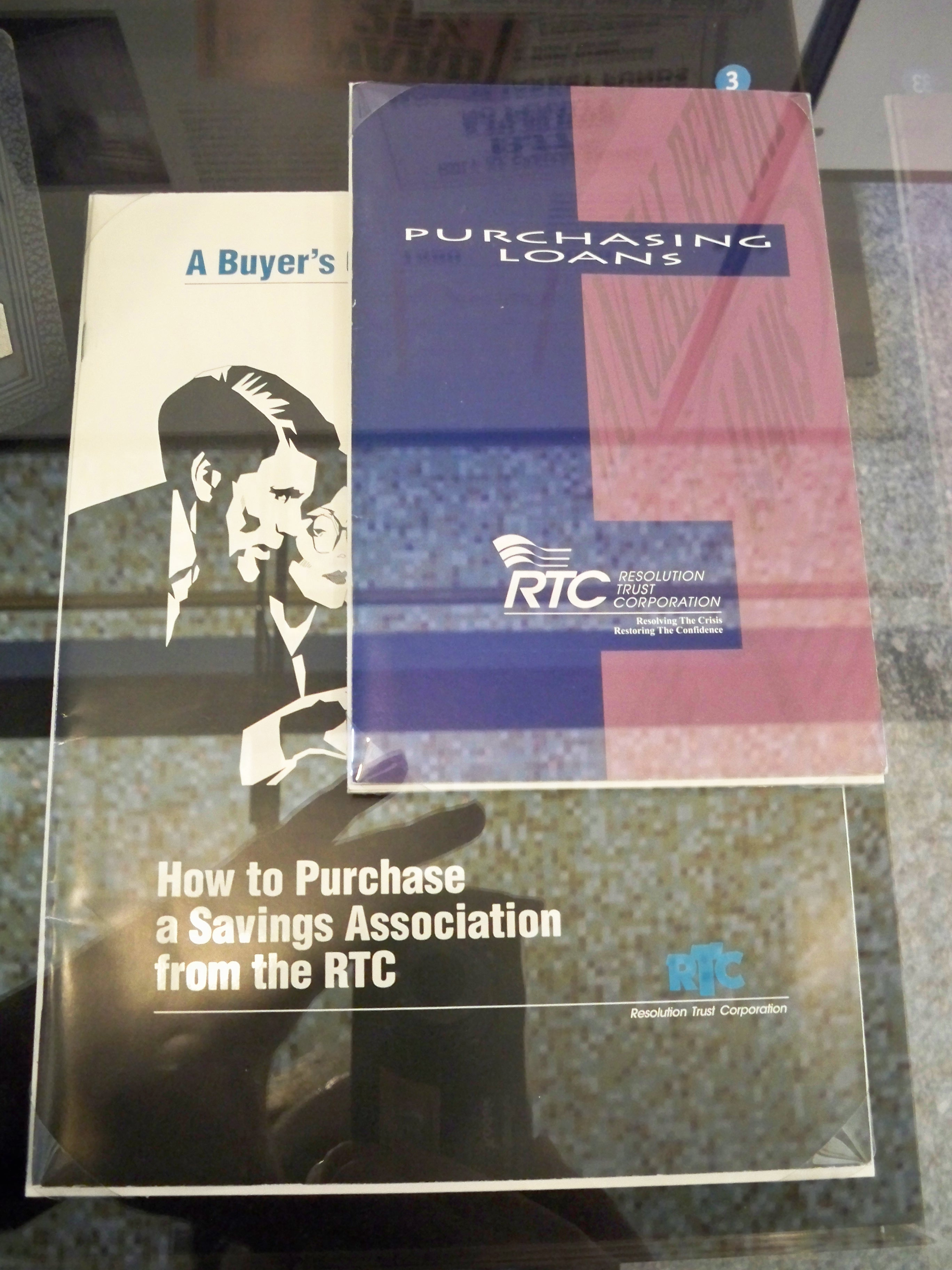
RTC literature in the Federal Deposit Insurance Corporation history exhibit

Resolution Trust Corporation (RTC) was a U.S. government-owned asset management company first run by Lewis William Seidman and charged with liquidating assets, primarily real estate-related assets such as mortgage loans, that had been assets of savings and loan associations (S&Ls) declared insolvent by the Office of Thrift Supervision (OTS) as a consequence of the savings and loan crisis of the 1980s. It also took over the insurance functions of the former Federal Home Loan Bank Board (FHLBB).

Between 1989 and mid-1995, the Resolution Trust Corporation closed or otherwise resolved 747 thrifts with total assets of $394 billion. Its funding was provided by the Resolution Funding Corporation (REFCORP) which still exists to support the debt obligations it created for these functions.

== History ==
The Resolution Trust Corporation was established in 1989 by the Financial Institutions Reform Recovery and Enforcement Act (FIRREA), and it was overhauled in 1991. In addition to privatizing, and maximizing the recovery from the disposition of, the assets of failed S&Ls, FIRREA also included three specific goals designed to channel the resources of the RTC toward particular societal groups. The goals included maximizing opportunities for minority- and women-owned contractors, maximizing availability of affordable single- and multi-family housing, and protecting local real estate and financial markets from asset dumping. Of the three goals, only the protection of local markets and concerns over dumping was given a great deal of attention. The agency was slow to implement Minority and Women-owned Business (MWOB) and Affordable Housing programs.

The Resolution Trust Corporation was a 501(c)(1) organization.

In 1995, the Resolution Trust Corporation's duties were transferred to the Savings Association Insurance Fund (SAIF) of the Federal Deposit Insurance Corporation (FDIC). In 2006, the SAIF and its sister fund for banks—the bank insurance fund (BIF)—also administered by the FDIC, were combined to form the Deposit Insurance Fund (DIF) under the provisions of the Federal Deposit Insurance Reform Act of 2005.

== Equity partnership ==
After initially emphasizing individual and bulk asset sales, the Resolution Trust Corporation pioneered the use of equity partnerships to help liquidate real estate and financial assets inherited from insolvent thrift institutions. While a number of different structures were used, all of the equity partnerships involved a private sector partner acquiring a partial interest in a pool of assets, controlling the management and sale of the assets in the pool, and making distributions to the RTC based on the RTC's retained interest.

The equity partnerships allowed the RTC to participate in any gains from the portfolios. Prior to introducing the equity partnership program, the RTC had engaged in outright individual and bulk sales of its asset portfolios. The pricing on certain types of assets often proved to be disappointing because the purchasers discounted heavily for unknowns regarding the assets, and to reflect uncertainty at the time regarding the real estate market. By retaining an interest in asset portfolios, the RTC was able to participate in the extremely strong returns being realized by portfolio investors. Additionally, the equity partnerships enabled the RTC to benefit by the management and liquidation efforts of their private sector partners, and the structure helped assure an alignment of incentives superior to that which typically exists in a principal/contractor relationship.

The following is a summary description of RTC Equity Partnership Programs:

=== Multiple Investor Fund ===
Under the Multiple Investor Funds (MIF) program, the RTC established limited partnerships (each known as a Multiple Investor Fund) and selected private sector entities to be the general partner of each MIF.

The RTC conveyed to the MIF a portfolio of assets (principally commercial non- and sub-performing mortgage loans) which were described generically, but which had not been identified at the time the MIF general partners were selected. The assets were delivered in separate pools over time, and there were separate closings for each pool.

The selected general partner paid the RTC for its partnership interest in the assets. The price was determined by the Derived Investment Value (DIV) of the assets (an estimate of the liquidation value of assets based on a valuation formula developed by the RTC), multiplied by a percentage of DIV based on the bid of the selected general partner. The general partner paid its equity share relating to each pool at the closing on the pool. The RTC retained a limited partnership interest in the MIF.

The MIF asset portfolio was leveraged by RTC-provided seller financing. The RTC offered up to 75% seller financing, and one element of the bid was the amount of seller financing required by the bidder. Because of the leverage, the amount required to be paid by the MIF general partner on account of its interest was less than it would have been if the MIF had been an all-equity transaction.

The MIF general partner, on behalf of the MIF, engaged an asset manager (one or more entities of the MIF general partner team) to manage and liquidate the asset pool. The asset manager was paid a servicing fee out of MIF funds, and used MIF funds to improve, manage and market the assets. The asset manager was responsible for day-to-day management of the MIF, but the general partner controlled major budgetary and liquidation decisions. The RTC had no management role.

After repayment of the RTC seller financing debt, net cash flow was divided between the RTC (as limited partner) and general partner in accordance with their respective percentage interests (the general partner had at least a 50% interest).

Each of the MIF general partners was a joint venture among an asset manager with experience in managing and liquidating distressed real estate assets, and a capital source. There were two MIF transactions involving more than 1,000 loans having an aggregate book value of slightly over $2 billion and an aggregate DIV of $982 million.

=== Mortgage trusts ===
The N-series and S-series mortgage trust programs were successor programs to the MIF program. The N-series and S-series structure was different from that of the MIF in that the subject assets were pre-identified by the RTC (under the MIF, the specific assets had not been identified in advance of the bidding) and the interests in the asset portfolios were competitively bid on by pre-qualified investors with the highest bid winning (the RTC's process for selecting MIF general partners, in contrast, took into account non-price factors).

==== N series ====
The "N" of the N series stood for "nonperforming". For the N series, the RTC would convey to a Delaware business trust a pre-identified portfolio of assets, mostly commercial non- and sub-performing mortgage loans. Pre-qualified investor teams competitively bid for a 49% interest in the trust, and the equity for this interest was payable to the RTC by the winning bidder when it closed on the acquisition of its interest.

The trust, at its creation, issued a class A certificate to the private sector investor evidencing its ownership interest in the Trust, and a class B certificate to the RTC evidencing its ownership interest. The class A certificate holder exercised those management powers typically associated with a general partner (that is, it controlled the operation of the trust), and the RTC, as the class B certificate holder, had a passive interest typical of a limited partner.

The class A certificate holder, on behalf of the trust, engaged an asset manager to manage and liquidate the asset pool. The asset manager was paid a servicing fee out of trust funds. Typically, the asset manager was a joint venture partner in the class A certificate holder. The asset manager used trust funds to improve, maintain and liquidate trust assets, and had day-to-day management control. The class A certificate holder exercised control over major budgetary and disposition decisions.

The trust, through a pre-determined placement agent designated by the RTC, leveraged its asset portfolio by issuing commercial mortgage-backed securities (CMBSs), the proceeds of which went to the RTC. Because of the leverage, the amount required to be paid by the class A certificate holder on account of its interest was less than it would have been if the N-Trust had been an all-equity transaction.

Net cash flow was first used to repay the CMBS debt, after which it was divided between the RTC and class A certificate holder at their respective equity percentages (51% RTC, 49% class A).

There were a total of six N-series partnership transactions in which the RTC placed 2,600 loans with an approximate book value of $2.8 billion and a DIV of $1.3 billion. A total of $975 million of CMBS bonds were issued for the six N-series transaction, representing 60% of the value of N-series trust assets as determined by the competitive bid process (the value of the assets implied by the investor bids was substantially greater than the DIV values calculated by the RTC). While the original bond maturity was 10 years from the transaction, the average bond was retired in 21 months from the transaction date, and all bonds were retired within 28 months.

==== S series ====
The S-series program was similar to the N-series program, and contained the same profile of assets as the N-series transactions. The S series was designed to appeal to investors who might lack the resources necessary to undertake an N-series transaction, and differed from the N-series program in the following respects.

The S-series portfolios were smaller. The "S" of S series stands for "small"; the average S-series portfolio had a book value of $113 million and a DIV of $52 million, whereas the N-series average portfolio had a book value of $464 million and a DIV of $220 million. As a consequence, it required an equity investment of $4 to $9 million for investor to undertake an S-series transaction, versus $30 to $70 million for an N-series transaction.

The S-series portfolio was not leveraged through the issuance of CMBS, although it was leveraged through a 60% RTC purchase money financing. In the N-series program where CMBS were issued, the asset managers had to be qualified by debt rating agencies (e.g., Standard & Poor's) as a condition to the agencies' giving a rating to the CMBS. This was not necessary in the S-series program

Assets in the S-series portfolios were grouped geographically, so as to reduce the investors' due diligence costs.

There were nine S-series transactions, into which the RTC contributed more than 1,100 loans having a total book value of approximately $1 billion and a DIV of $466 million. The RTC purchase money loans, aggregating $284 million for the nine S-transactions, were all paid off within 22 months of the respective transaction closing dates (on average, the purchase money loans were retired in 16 months).

=== Land Fund ===
The RTC Land Fund program was created to enable the RTC to share in the profit from longer term recovery and development of land. Under the Land Fund program, the RTC selected private sector entities to be the general partners of 30-year term limited partnerships known as Land Funds. The Land Fund program was different from the MIF and N/S-Series programs in that the Land Fund general partner had the authority to engage in long-term development, whereas the MIFs and N/S-Series Trusts were focused on asset liquidation.

The RTC conveyed to the Land Fund certain pre-identified land parcels, and non/sub-performing mortgage loans secured by land parcels. The selected general partner paid the RTC for its general partnership interest in the Land Fund. The winning bid for each Land Fund pool would determine the implied value of the pool, and the winning bidder, at closing, would pay to the RTC 25% of the implied value. The land fund investors were given the option of contributing 25%, 30%, 35%, or 40% of the equity for commensurate interest, but all chose to contribute 25% of the equity.

The Land Fund general partner could, at its discretion, transfer assets in Land Fund pools to special-purpose entities, and those entities could then borrow money collateralized by the asset to fund development. Furthermore, a third-party developer or financing source could acquire an equity interest in the special purpose entity in exchange for services or funding. The general partner was authorized to develop the land parcels on a long-term basis, and had comprehensive authority concerning the operation of the Land Fund. Costs to improve, manage and liquidate the assets were borne by the Land Fund.

Net cash flow from the Land Fund was distributable in proportion to the respective contributions of the general partner (25%) and RTC (75%). If and when the Land Fund partnership distributed to the RTC an amount equal to the RTC's capital investment (i.e., 75% of the implied value of the Land Fund pool), from and after such point, net cash flow would be divided on a 50/50 basis.

Land Fund general partners were joint ventures between asset managers, developers and capital sources. There were three land fund programs, giving rise to 12 land fund partnerships for different land asset portfolios. These funds received 815 assets with a total book value of $2 billion and DIV of $614 million.

=== Judgments, deficiencies, and chargeoffs (JDC) program ===
Under the judgments, deficiencies, and chargeoffs Program (JDC), the RTC established limited partnerships and selected private sector entities to be the general partner of each JDC Partnership. The JDC program was different from the MIF, N/S Series and Land Fund programs in that the general partner paid only a nominal price for the assets and was selected on a beauty-contest basis, and the general partner (rather than the partnership itself) had to absorb most operating costs.

The RTC would convey to the limited partnership certain judgments, deficiency actions, and charged-off indebtedness (JDCs) and other claims which typically were unsecured and considered of questionable value. The assets were not identified in advance, and were transferred to the JDC partnership in a series of conveyances over time.

The general partner was selected purely on the basis of perceived competence. It made payments to the RTC in the amount of one basis point (0.01%) of the book value of the assets conveyed. The general partner exercised comprehensive control in managing and resolving the assets. Proceeds typically were split 50/50 with the RTC. Operating costs (except under special circumstances) were absorbed by the general partner, not the JDC partnership.

JDC general partners consisted of asset managers and collection firms. The JDC program was adopted by the FDIC and is still in existence.

== Controversy ==
Early investigations of the RTC by the General Accounting Office found evidence of fraud and waste, with RTC officials conceding that the volume of real estate dispositions and staff shortages created a significant potential for misconduct and mismanagement.

Susan Hudson-Wilson, founder and president of Property & Portfolio Research, later described the RTC as involving "the greatest and most unfair transfer of wealth that has ever taken place in this country—perhaps the whole world."

== See also ==
- Fractional-reserve banking
- Tax Reform Act of 1986
- Cottage Savings Association v. Commissioner
- Reconstruction Finance Corporation
