= Regulatory responses to the subprime crisis =

Regulatory responses to the subprime crisis addresses various actions taken by governments around the world to address the effects of the subprime mortgage crisis.

Regulators and legislators are considering action regarding lending practices, bankruptcy protection, tax policies, affordable housing, credit counseling, education, and the licensing. Regulations or guidelines can also influence the nature, transparency and regulatory reporting required for the complex legal entities and securities involved in these transactions. Congress also is conducting hearings to help identify solutions and apply pressure to the various parties involved.

U.S. President Barack Obama and key advisers introduced a series of regulatory proposals in June 2009. The proposals address consumer protection, executive pay, bank financial cushions or capital requirements, expanded regulation of the shadow banking system and derivatives, and enhanced authority for the Federal Reserve to safely wind-down systemically important institutions, among others.

U.S. Treasury Secretary Timothy Geithner testified before Congress on October 29, 2009. His testimony included five elements he stated as critical to effective reform:

1. Expand the Federal Deposit Insurance Corporation (FDIC) bank resolution mechanism to include non-bank financial institutions;
2. Ensure that a firm is allowed to fail in an orderly way and not be "rescued";
3. Ensure taxpayers are not on the hook for any losses, by applying losses first to the firm's investors and including the creation of a pool funded by the largest financial institutions;
4. Apply appropriate checks and balances to the FDIC and Federal Reserve in this resolution process;
5. Require stronger capital and liquidity positions for financial firms and related regulatory authority.

The Dodd–Frank Wall Street Reform and Consumer Protection Act was signed into law by President Obama in July 2010, addressing each of these topics to varying degrees. Among other things, it created the Consumer Financial Protection Bureau.

== Housing and Economic Recovery Act of 2008 ==
The Housing and Economic Recovery Act of 2008 in the United States included six separate major acts designed to restore confidence in the domestic mortgage industry. The Act included:

- Providing insurance for $300 billion in mortgages estimated to assist 400,000 homeowners.
- Establishing a new regulator, the Federal Housing Finance Agency via the merger of two existing authorities, The Office of Federal Housing Enterprise Oversight (OFHEO), and the Federal Housing Finance Board (FHFB), endowed with expanded powers and authority greater than the sum of its predecessors, to supervise operation of the 14 housing government-sponsored enterprises (GSEs): (Fannie Mae and Freddie Mac) and the 12 Federal Home Loan Banks.
- Raises the dollar limit of the mortgages the GSEs can purchase.
- Provides loans for the refinancing of mortgages to owner-occupants at risk of foreclosure. The original lender or investor reduces the amount of the original mortgage (typically taking a significant loss) and the homeowner shares any future appreciation with the Federal Housing Administration. The new loans must be 30-year fixed loans.
- Enhancements to mortgage disclosures.
- Community assistance to help local governments buy and renovate foreclosed properties.
- An increase in the national debt ceiling by US$800 billion, to give the Treasury the flexibility to support the secondary housing markets and the 14 GSEs, if necessary.

== Federal reserve powers ==
A sweeping proposal was presented 31 March 2008 regarding the regulatory powers of the U.S. Federal Reserve, expanding its jurisdiction over other types of financial institutions and authority to intervene in market crises.

== Expansion of government agency authority ==
The U.S House passed a bill in early April, 2008 that would offer government insurance on $300 billion (~$428 billion in 2024) in new mortgages to refinance loans for an estimated 500,000 borrowers facing foreclosure and an additional 15 billion to affected states to buy and fix foreclosed homes.

== Lending practices ==
In response to a concern that lending was not properly regulated, the House and Senate are both considering bills to regulate lending practices.

== U.S. Congressional ethics reform ==
In the wake of a subprime mortgage crisis and questions about Countrywide Financial’s VIP program, ethics experts and key senators recommend that members of congress should be required to disclose information about their mortgages.

== Capital reserve requirements ==
Non-depository banks (e.g., investment banks and mortgage companies) are not subject to the same capital reserve requirements as depository banks. Many of the investment banks had limited capital reserves to address declines in mortgage-backed securities or support their side of credit default derivative insurance contracts. Nobel prize winner Joseph Stiglitz recommends that regulations be established to limit the extent of leverage permitted and not allow companies to become "too big to fail", by breaking them up into smaller entities. He has also recommended reforming executive compensation, to make it less short-term focused; enhance consumer protection; and establish a regulatory review mechanism for new exotic types of financial instruments.

== Short-selling restrictions ==
UK regulators announced a temporary ban on short-selling of financial stocks on September 18, 2008. Short-selling is a method of profiting when a stock declines in value. When large, speculative short-sale bets accumulate against a stock or other financial asset, the price can be driven down. Short sales were among the causes blamed for rapid price declines in Lehman Brother's stock price prior to its bankruptcy. On September 19 the U.S. Securities and Exchange Commission (SEC) followed by placing a temporary ban of short-selling stocks of financial institutions. In addition, the SEC made it easier for institutions to buy back shares of their institutions. The halt of short-selling in the US was set to expire on October 2, but was extended until it expired at 11:59PM EDT on October 8. The action was based on the view that short selling in a crisis market undermines confidence in financial institutions and erodes their stability.

== Proposed solutions ==
America's genius has not been in avoiding problems, it's been in surmounting them once they happen.

— Warren Buffett

President Barack Obama and key advisers introduced a series of regulatory proposals in June 2009. The proposals address consumer protection, executive pay, bank financial cushions or capital requirements, expanded regulation of the shadow banking system and derivatives, and enhanced authority for the Federal Reserve to safely wind-down systemically important institutions, among others. Legislation has cleared the house and is progressing in the senate.

A variety of regulatory changes have been proposed by economists, politicians, journalists, and business leaders to minimize the impact of the current crisis and prevent recurrence. However, as of April 2009, many of the proposed solutions have not yet been implemented. These include:

- Ben Bernanke: Establish resolution procedures for closing troubled financial institutions in the shadow banking system, such as investment banks and hedge funds.
- Joseph Stiglitz: Restrict the leverage that financial institutions can assume. Require executive compensation to be more related to long-term performance. Re-instate the separation of commercial (depository) and investment banking established by the Glass–Steagall Act in 1933 and repealed in 1999 by the Gramm-Leach-Bliley Act.
- Simon Johnson: Break-up institutions that are "too big to fail" to limit systemic risk.
- Paul Krugman: Regulate institutions that "act like banks " similarly to banks.
- Alan Greenspan: Banks should have a stronger capital cushion, with graduated regulatory capital requirements (i.e., capital ratios that increase with bank size), to "discourage them from becoming too big and to offset their competitive advantage."
- Warren Buffett: Require minimum down payments for home mortgages of at least 10% and income verification.
- Eric Dinallo: Ensure any financial institution has the necessary capital to support its financial commitments. Regulate credit derivatives and ensure they are traded on well-capitalized exchanges to limit counterparty risk.
- Raghuram Rajan: Require financial institutions to maintain sufficient "contingent capital" (i.e., pay insurance premiums to the government during boom periods, in exchange for payments during a downturn.)
- A. Michael Spence and Gordon Brown: Establish an early-warning system to help detect systemic risk.
- Niall Ferguson and Jeffrey Sachs: Impose haircuts on bondholders and counterparties prior to using taxpayer money in bailouts.
- Nouriel Roubini: Nationalize all US banks.
