= Minority entrepreneurship in the United States =

Minority entrepreneurship refers to entrepreneurial activity (new business creation) by individuals who belong to a minority group. In the United States, minority groups often include people who identify as African American, Hispanic, or indigenous; these social groups do not own businesses at a rate commensurate to their share of the population. For example, African American-owned businesses comprise 2.3% of businesses in 2022 even though African Americans are 14.2% of the American population. One explanation for this discrepancy is the history and persistence of discriminatory economic practices that result in a disparity in credit scores between white Americans and minority groups. The inequity in creditworthiness begins with redlining, but modern challenges to minority entrepreneurship also include corporate consolidation and an unrepresentative venture capital industry. There have been recent efforts to bolster minority entrepreneurs, often through startup incubators and minority-focused venture capital.

== History ==
Federal economic policies during the 1930's codified discriminatory lending practices against minorities, and reparative legislative efforts to undo this harm began 40 years later.

=== Redlining ===
The history of redlining largely begins with the Great Depression. The economic downturn prompted a wave of home foreclosures, a costly crisis for both homeowners and banks. As a response, Congress passed the Federal Home Loan Bank Act in 1932, with the goal of revitalizing the housing market in the United States. In the process, the Federal Home Loan Bank Act created the Home Owners' Loan Corporation, an organization with the responsibility of buying and refinancing bonds on favorable terms to people who had borrowed money. To enable easy assessment of risk, HOLC drew maps of areas that characterized the risk of lending to people in different neighborhoods. Neighborhoods with the highest risk associated with them were circled in red and their residents were systematically denied access to loans necessary to buy homes in better, wealthier neighborhoods, a practice now known as redlining.

=== Reparative efforts ===
Beginning in the 1970s, the U.S. government passed legislation to undo the harm of redlining. In the 1970s, the Community Development Block Grant, with the included Community Reinvestment Act, forced banks to meet the credit needs of the communities within which they were located. In the 1980s, the federal government piloted low-income housing tax credits to entice private investors to fund affordable housing projects. In the 1990s, the HOME program gave municipalities specific resources for low-income housing. The vast majority of these investment efforts were meant to create affordable housing, and viewed home ownership as the path to generate community wealth.

More recent developments, such as the creation of opportunity zones in 2017, allows and incentivizes more diverse avenues of investments into communities. Another example is the State Small Business Credit Initiative, which provides states with capital to provide to either venture capital or lending programs, and allows states to tailor their funding to the specific needs of minority entrepreneurs in their area.

== Barriers to entry ==
Minority entrepreneurs face multiple barriers to entry that contribute to a continued disparity in rates of entrepreneurship among different groups. These include competition with larger corporations whose profits move outside neighborhoods, and the difficulties of acquiring venture capital.

=== Corporate consolidation ===
Big businesses often extract wealth out of low-income minority neighborhoods. The decline of black businesses can partially be attributed to corporate consolidation. When they move into minority neighborhoods, big chain grocers who can afford to sell at lower prices often displace local, minority-owned grocers. They then raise prices once the competition has been eliminated. Moreover, the wealth created by these businesses goes to company headquarters instead of staying in the community like it does with local businesses.

=== Venture capital ===
Minority entrepreneurs that seek to create larger-scale businesses face challenges when seeking venture capital. These challenges have been documented by the industry itself, with reports that Latino and Black founders only raise 1.8% and 1% of the total capital, respectively, and that employees of venture capital firms are overwhelmingly white, with black employees comprising only 4% of the total workforce and Hispanic employees being 5%.

=== Structural barriers facing immigrant women entrepreneurs ===
Immigrant women entrepreneurs face a distinct set of structural barriers that arise at the intersection of race, gender, and immigration status. Although immigrant entrepreneurs overall contribute significantly to the U.S. economy, women in this group are often misrecognized within policy frameworks, either classified as informal actors or viewed primarily through charitable assistance narratives. Nancy Fraser's work on the politicization of needs emphasizes that recognition and interpretation of economic needs are deeply political processes, often reinforcing existing power dynamics rather than addressing structural exclusion.

Research by Fairlie (2012) highlights that immigrant-owned businesses typically have limited access to formal financial capital, relying instead on personal savings or informal networks. In addition, immigrant women entrepreneurs face added challenges such as language barriers, discrimination in licensing, and exclusion from traditional business networks.

=== Policy gaps and minority entrepreneurship ===
Despite targeted programs such as the Community Reinvestment Act and the State Small Business Credit Initiative, systemic gaps remain in how public policy supports minority entrepreneurs. Scholars have noted that many policies adopt a race-neutral approach, which fails to address the specific historical and structural disadvantages faced by minority-owned businesses. In particular, immigrant entrepreneurs who lack access to formal credit markets, licensing assistance, and culturally competent mentorship remain underserved. Recent critiques argue for a shift toward equity-focused policies that prioritize community wealth-building and inclusive entrepreneurial ecosystems, rather than solely emphasizing rapid business scaling or venture capital access.

== Minority-focused capital ==
Some investors in the market have also sought to reduce this disparity through creating venture capital firms or startup incubators targeting minority entrepreneurs.

=== Minority-focused venture capital firms ===
Minority-focused venture capital firms receive their funding either from public pension funds or funds that invest in venture capital firms. A study found that these sources of funding prefer minority-focused VCs that also invest in white-owned businesses and reflect demographics more similar to the investors, rather than VCs that solely target minority-owned businesses. The same study also found that venture capital has shifted away from traditional fields like wholesale, manufacturing, and retail to high-technology. This has meant that minority-focused VCs are also more likely now to invest in high-technology startups, which risks skewing their investment portfolio against more community-focused (not necessarily high-tech) businesses started by minorities. Research also shows that venture capitalists are more likely to invest in founders who share their ethnicity, a pattern known as ethnic matching.

=== Minority-focused startup incubators ===
Certain startup incubators target their resources and mentorship at minority-owned businesses. These business incubators often approach business creation with different methodologies, with two of them being "scaling up" and "scaling deep". A study looked at the results of two minority-focused startup incubators in Detroit, one with the "scaling up" methodology and the other focused on "scaling deep" instead. An examination of the first incubator revealed that many of the businesses included in the incubator quickly scaled up to the national level and moved their headquarters out of Detroit. This focus on immediately scaling up the business created a need for more capital, and the original business ideas were modified to become more appealing to venture capitalists. VC executives also focused their mentorship on a profitable exit strategy, usually acquisition by a bigger company. These results were very different than the second business incubator which was not as concerned with generating and maintaining venture capital funding, and instead was able to focus on generating wealth for their local community. Unlike the other incubator, these startups did not scale nationally, but instead formed strong connections with other local businesses, creating mutually beneficial partnerships. Most importantly, business headquarters (and the jobs associated with them) stayed in Detroit. Since both the work and the profits of the business stayed in Detroit, this led to increased job creation not only by the startups themselves but also the businesses they partnered with.
