= Federal Home Loan Bank Act =

- Long title: An Act to create Federal Home Loan Banks, to provide for the supervision thereof, and for other purposes.
- Nicknames: Federal Home Loan Bank Act of 1932
- Enacted by: the 72nd United States Congress
- Effective: July 22, 1932

Citations
- Public law: 72-304
- Statutes at Large: 47 Stat. 725

Codification
- Titles amended: 12 U.S.C.: Banks and Banking
- U.S.C. sections created: 12 U.S.C. ch. 11 § 1421 et seq.

Legislative history
- Introduced in the House as H.R. 12280 by Michael Reilly (D–WI) on May 25, 1932; Committee consideration by House Banking and Currency, Senate Banking and Currency; Passed the House on June 15, 1932 (Passed); Passed the Senate on July 12, 1932 (Passed); Reported by the joint conference committee on July 13, 1932; agreed to by the House on July 16, 1932 (Agreed) and by the Senate on July 16, 1932 (Agreed); Signed into law by President Herbert Hoover on July 22, 1932

The Federal Home Loan Bank Act, Pub. L. 72–304, 47 Stat. 725, enacted July 22, 1932, is a United States federal law passed under President Herbert Hoover in order to lower the cost of home ownership. It established the Federal Home Loan Bank Board to charter and supervise federal savings and loan institutions. It also created the Federal Home Loan Banks which lend to building and loan associations, cooperative banks, homestead associations, insurance companies, savings banks, community development financial institutions, and insured depository institutions in order to finance home mortgages.

== Amendments ==
=== Successful ===
The act was notably amended by Financial Institutions Reform, Recovery and Enforcement Act of 1989, which transferred regulation of thrifts to the Office of Thrift Supervision.

=== Proposed ===
On November 21, 2013, Rep. Steve Stivers introduced the bill To amend the Federal Home Loan Bank Act to authorize privately insured credit unions to become members of a Federal home loan bank (H.R. 3584; 113th Congress) into the United States House of Representatives. The bill would amend the Federal Home Loan Bank Act to treat certain privately insured credit unions as insured depository institutions for purposes of determining eligibility for membership in a federal home loan bank. The bill was scheduled to be voted on under a suspension of the rules on May 6, 2014.
