= Nationwide Multi-State Licensing System and Registry =

American registry of financial services licenses

The Nationwide Multi-State Licensing System and Registry (NMLS) (originally the Nationwide Mortgage Licensing System) is the system of record for non-depository, financial services licensing or registration in participating state agencies, including the District of Columbia and U.S. Territories of Puerto Rico, the U.S. Virgin Islands, and Guam. In these jurisdictions, NMLS is the official system for companies and individuals seeking to apply for, amend, renew and surrender license authorities managed through NMLS by 64 state or territorial governmental agencies. NMLS itself does not grant or deny license authority.

NMLS is the sole system of licensure for mortgage companies for 58 state agencies and the sole system of licensure for Mortgage Loan Originators (MLOs) for 59 state and territorial agencies. Over three-quarters of the states also currently manage additional license types through the System in the money services business, debt and consumer finance industries. NMLS is also the system of record for the registration of depositories, subsidiaries of depositories, and MLOs under the Consumer Financial Protection Bureau's Regulation G (S.A.F.E. Mortgage Licensing Act – Federal Registration of Residential Mortgage Loan Originators), published December 19, 2011.

NMLS is owned and operated by the State Regulatory Registry LLC, a wholly owned subsidiary of the Conference of State Bank Supervisors (CSBS).

The system provides for all mortgage originators to be assigned a unique identifying number that would be associated with them as they moved between companies, and between states, thus helping to prevent problematic individuals from escaping the consequences of their past activities.

== History ==
=== Origins ===
NMLS was created in January 2008 by the Conference of State Bank Supervisors (CSBS) and the American Association of Residential Mortgage Regulators (AARMR), both based in Washington, DC. It began operations as a voluntary system among seven states cooperating to improve regulation of the mortgage and other non-depository industries through better supervision, streamlined licensing procedures, and enhanced consumer protection.

=== The SAFE Act ===
Title V of The Housing and Economic Recovery Act of 2008 (HERA), the Secure and Fair Enforcement for Mortgage Licensing Act (SAFE Act), required that all states license mortgage originators through NMLS, and required all licensed and registered mortgage originators to register with NMLS. The SAFE Act requires originators to complete pre-licensing education approved by NMLS.

=== Expansion ===
In 2017, New York regulators announced the expansion of their use of NMLS to include regulation of money transmitters.

=== NMLS 2.0 ===
NMLS 2.0 was scheduled for release in the second quarter of 2019.

== See also ==
- Regulatory responses to the subprime crisis
- Home Mortgage Disclosure Act
