= Savings and loan association =

Type of financial institution

A savings and loan association (S&L), or thrift institution, is a financial institution that specializes in accepting savings deposits and making mortgage and other loans. While the terms "S&L" and "thrift" are mainly used in the United States, similar institutions in the United Kingdom, Ireland and some Commonwealth countries include building societies and trustee savings banks. They are often mutually held (often called mutual savings banks), meaning that the depositors and borrowers are members with voting rights, and have the ability to direct the financial and managerial goals of the organization like the members of a credit union or the policyholders of a mutual insurance company. While it is possible for an S&L to be a joint-stock company, and even publicly traded, in such instances it is no longer truly a mutual association, and depositors and borrowers no longer have membership rights and managerial control. By law, thrifts can have no more than 20 percent of their lending in commercial loans—their focus on mortgage and consumer loans made them particularly vulnerable during the United States housing bubble and the 2008 financial crisis.

== Early history ==
At the beginning of the 19th century, banking was still something only done by those who had assets or wealth that needed safekeeping. The first savings bank in the United States, the Philadelphia Saving Fund Society, was established on December 20, 1816, and by the 1830s, such institutions had become widespread.

In the United Kingdom, the first savings bank was founded in 1810 by Henry Duncan, the minister of Ruthwell Church in Dumfriesshire, Scotland. It is home to the Savings Bank Museum, in which there are records relating to the history of the savings bank movement in the United Kingdom, as well as family memorabilia relating to Henry Duncan and other prominent people of the surrounding area. However, the main type of institution similar to U.S. savings and loan associations in the United Kingdom is not the savings bank, but the building society and had existed since the 1770s.

== U.S. savings and loan in the 20th century ==
The savings and loan association became a strong force in the early 20th century through assisting people with home ownership, through mortgage lending, and further assisting their members with basic saving and investing outlets, typically through passbook savings accounts and term certificates of deposit.

The savings and loan associations of this era were famously portrayed in the 1946 film It's a Wonderful Life.

=== Mortgage lending ===
The earliest mortgages were not offered by banks, but by insurance companies, and they differed greatly from the mortgage or home loan that is familiar today. Most early mortgages were short with some kind of balloon payment at the end of the term, or they were interest-only loans which did not pay anything toward the principal of the loan with each payment. As such, many people were either perpetually in debt in a continuous cycle of refinancing their home purchase, or they lost their home through foreclosure when they were unable to make the balloon payment at the end of the term of that loan.

The US Congress passed the Federal Home Loan Bank Act in 1932, during the Great Depression. It established the Federal Home Loan Bank and associated Federal Home Loan Bank Board to assist other banks in providing funding to offer long term, amortized loans for home purchases. The idea was to get banks involved in lending, not insurance companies, and to provide realistic loans which people could repay and gain full ownership of their homes.

Savings and loan associations sprang up all across the United States because there was low-cost funding available through the Federal Home Loan Bank Act.

=== Further advantages ===
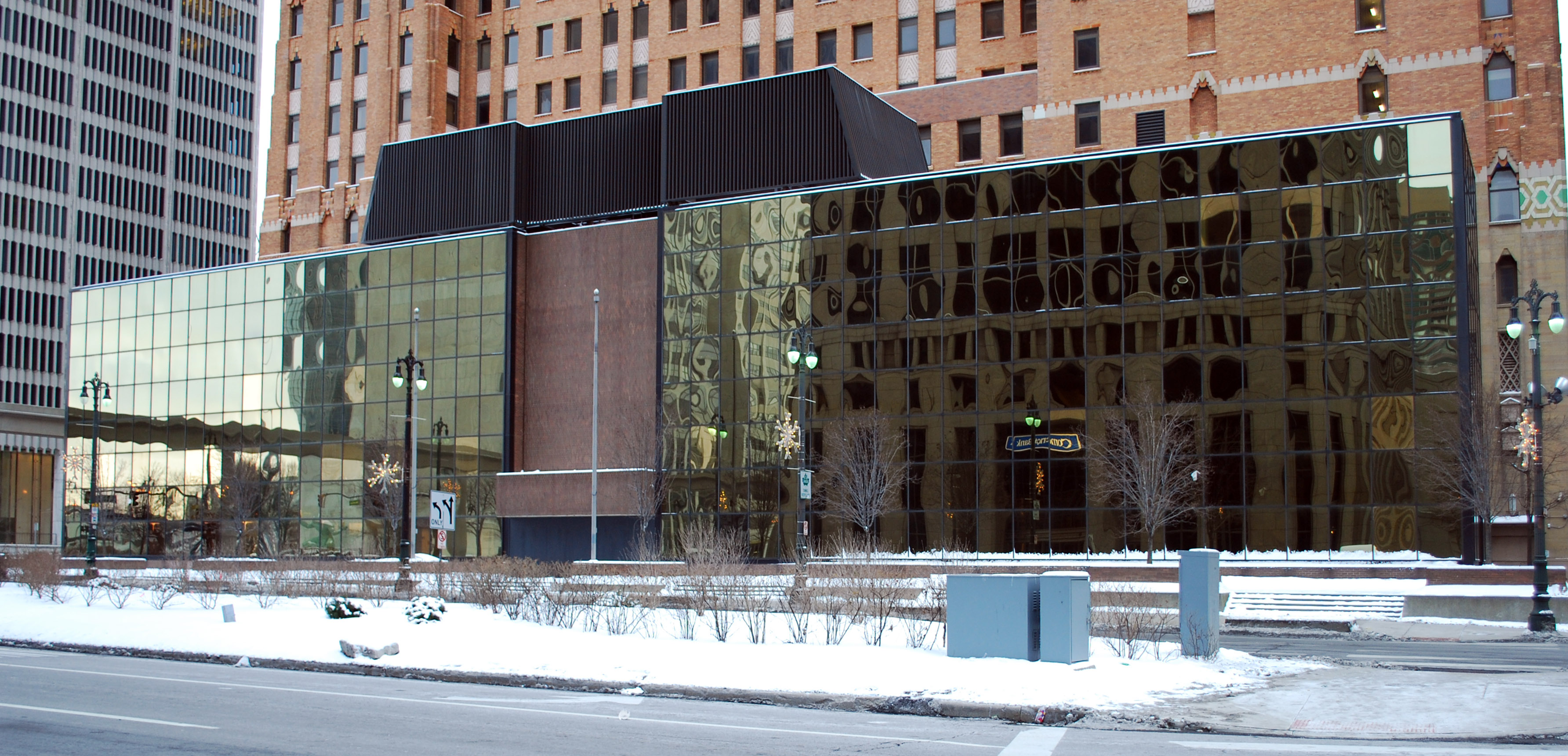
Detroit Federal Savings and Loan Association Building, Detroit, Michigan

Savings and loans were given a certain amount of preferential treatment by the Federal Reserve inasmuch as they were given the ability to pay higher interest rates on savings deposits compared to a regular commercial bank. This was known as Regulation Q (The Interest Rate Adjustment Act of 1966) and gave the S&Ls 50 basis points above what banks could offer. The idea was that with marginally higher savings rates, savings and loans would attract more deposits that would allow them to continue to write more mortgage loans, which would keep the mortgage market liquid, and funds would always be available to potential borrowers.

However, savings and loans were not allowed to offer checking accounts until the late 1970s. This reduced the attractiveness of savings and loans to consumers, since it required consumers to hold accounts across multiple institutions in order to have access to both checking privileges and competitive savings rates.

In the 1980s, the situation changed. The United States Congress granted all thrifts in 1980, including savings and loan associations, the power to make consumer and commercial loans and to issue transaction accounts. The Depository Institutions Deregulation and Monetary Control Act (DIDMCA) of 1980 was designed to help the banking industry to combat disintermediation of funds to higher-yielding non-deposit products such as money market mutual funds. It also allowed thrifts to make consumer loans up to 20 percent of their assets, issue credit cards, and provide negotiable order of withdrawal (NOW) accounts to consumers and nonprofit organizations. Over the next several years, this was followed by provisions that allowed banks and thrifts to offer a wide variety of new market-rate deposit products. For S&Ls, this deregulation of one side of the balance sheet essentially led to more inherent interest rate risk inasmuch as they were funding long-term, fixed-rate mortgage loans with volatile shorter-term deposits.

In 1982, the Garn-St. Germain Depository Institutions Act was passed and increased the proportion of assets that thrifts could hold in consumer and commercial real estate loans and allowed thrifts to invest 5 percent of their assets in commercial, corporate, business, or agricultural loans until January 1, 1984, when this percentage increased to 10 percent.

=== Decline ===
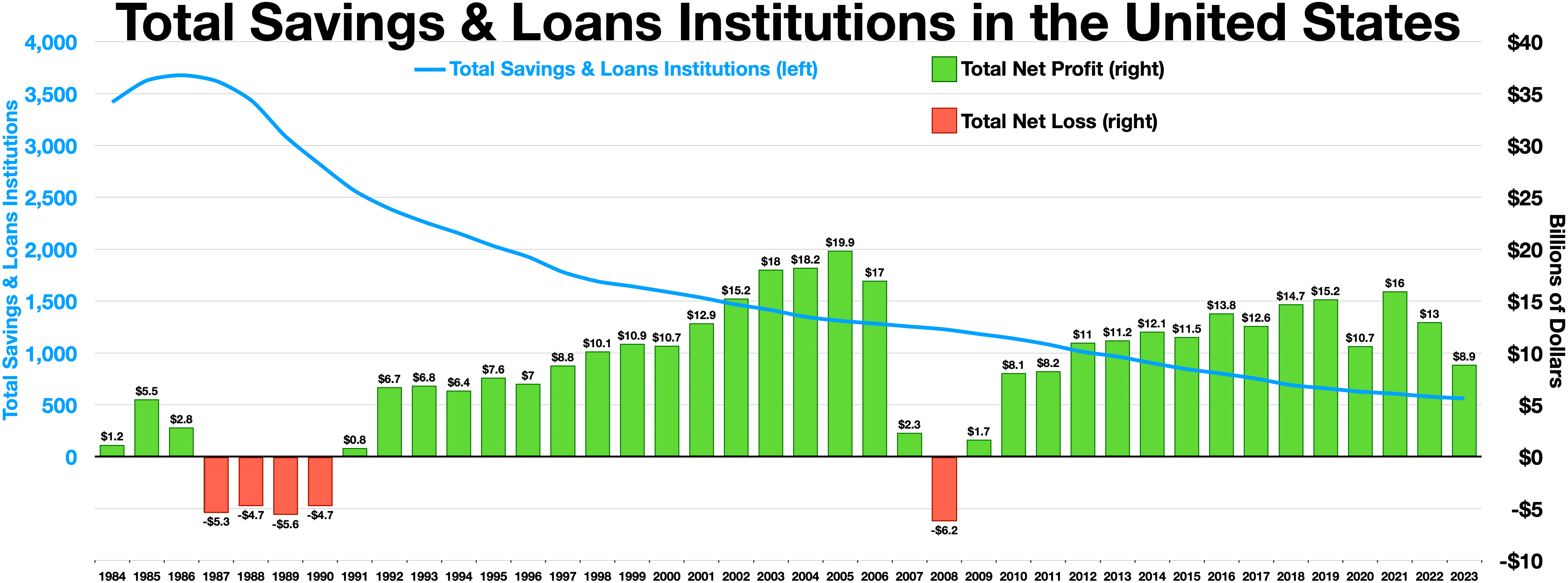
Total Savings & Loans Institutions in the United States

During the savings and loan crisis, from 1986 to 1995, the number of federally insured savings and loan institutions in the United States declined from 3,234 to 1,645. Analysts mostly attribute this to unsound real estate lending. The market share of S&Ls for single family mortgage loans went from 53% in 1975 to 30% in 1990.

The following is a detailed summary of the major causes for losses that hurt the S&L business in the 1980s according to the United States League of Savings Associations:

1. Lack of net worth for many institutions as they entered the 1980s and a wholly inadequate net worth regulation.
2. Decline in the effectiveness of Regulation Q in preserving the spread between the cost of money and the rate of return on assets, basically stemming from inflation and the accompanying increase in market interest rates.
3. Inability to vary the return on assets with increases in the rate of interest required to be paid for deposits.
4. Increased competition on the deposit gathering and mortgage origination sides of the business, coupled with a sudden burst of new technology making possible a whole new way of operating financial institutions generally speaking and the mortgage business specifically speaking.
5. A rapid increase in investment powers of associations with passage of the Depository Institutions Deregulation and Monetary Control Act (the Garn-St Germain Act), and, more important, through state legislative enactments in a number of important and rapidly growing states. These introduced new risks and speculative opportunities which were difficult to administer. In many instances management lacked the ability or experience to evaluate them, or to administer large volumes of nonresidential construction loans.
6. Elimination of regulations initially designed to prevent lending excesses and minimize failures. Regulatory relaxation permitted lending, directly and through participations, in distant loan markets on the promise of high returns. Lenders, however, were not familiar with these distant markets. It also permitted associations to participate extensively in speculative construction activities with builders and developers who had little or no financial stake in the projects.
7. Fraud and insider transaction abuses, especially in the case of state-chartered and regulated thrifts, where regulatory supervision at the state level was lax, thinly-spread, and/or insufficient (e.g.: Texas, Arizona).
8. A new type and generation of opportunistic savings and loan executives and owners — some of whom operated in a fraudulent manner — whose takeover of many institutions was facilitated by a change in FSLIC rules reducing the minimum number of stockholders of an insured association from 400 to one.
9. Dereliction of duty on the part of the board of directors of some savings associations. This permitted management to make uncontrolled use of some new operating authority, while directors failed to control expenses and prohibit obvious conflict of interest situations.
10. A virtual end of inflation in the American economy, together with overbuilding in multifamily, condominium-type residences and in commercial real estate in many cities. In addition, real estate values collapsed in the energy states — Texas, Louisiana, Oklahoma particularly due to falling oil prices — and weakness occurred in the mining and agricultural sectors of the economy.
11. Pressures felt by the management of many associations to restore net worth ratios. Anxious to improve earnings, they departed from their traditional lending practices into credits and markets involving higher risks, but with which they had little experience.
12. The lack of appropriate, accurate, and effective evaluations of the savings and loan business by public accounting firms, security analysts, and the financial community.
13. Organizational structure and supervisory laws, adequate for policing and controlling the business in the protected environment of the 1960s and 1970s, resulted in fatal delays and indecision in the examination/supervision process in the 1980s.
14. Federal and state examination and supervisory staffs insufficient in number, experience, or ability to deal with the new world of savings and loan operations.
15. The inability or unwillingness of the Federal Home Loan Bank Board and its legal and supervisory staff to deal with problem institutions in a timely manner. Many institutions, which ultimately closed with big losses, were known problem cases for a year or more. Often, it appeared, political considerations delayed necessary supervisory action.

While not specifically identified above, a related specific factor was that S&Ls and their lending management were often inexperienced with the complexities and risks associated with commercial and more complex loans as distinguished from their roots with "simple" home mortgage loans.

=== Consequences of U.S. government acts and reforms ===
As a result, the Financial Institutions Reform, Recovery and Enforcement Act of 1989 (FIRREA) dramatically changed the savings and loan industry and its federal regulation. Here are the highlights of this legislation, signed into law on August 9, 1989:

1. The Federal Home Loan Bank Board (FHLBB) and the Federal Savings and Loan Insurance Corporation (FSLIC) were abolished.
2. The Office of Thrift Supervision (OTS), a bureau of the United States Treasury Department, was created to charter, regulate, examine, and supervise savings institutions.
3. The Federal Housing Finance Board (FHFB) was created as an independent agency to oversee the 12 Federal Home Loan Banks (also called district banks), formerly overseen by the FHLBB.
4. The Savings Association Insurance Fund (SAIF) replaced the FSLIC as an ongoing insurance fund for thrift institutions. (Like the Federal Deposit Insurance Corporation (FDIC), FSLIC was a permanent corporation that insured savings and loan accounts up to $100,000.) SAIF was administered by the FDIC alongside its sister fund for banks, Bank Insurance Fund (BIF) until 2006 when the Federal Deposit Insurance Reform Act of 2005 (effective February 2006) provided, among other provisions, that the two funds merge to constitute the Depositor Insurance Fund (DIF), which would continue to be administered by the FDIC.
5. The Resolution Trust Corporation (RTC) was established to dispose of failed thrift institutions taken over by regulators after January 1, 1989.
6. FIRREA gave both Freddie Mac and Fannie Mae additional responsibility to support mortgages for low- and moderate-income families.

The Tax Reform Act of 1986 had also eliminated the ability for investors to reduce regular wage income by so-called "passive" losses incurred from real estate investments, e.g., depreciation and interest deductions. This caused real estate value to decline as investors pulled out of this sector.

== Characteristics ==
The most important purpose of savings and loan associations is to make mortgage loans on residential property. These organizations, which also are known as savings associations, building and loan associations, cooperative banks (in New England), and homestead associations (in Louisiana), are the primary source of financial assistance to a large segment of American homeowners. As home-financing institutions, they give primary attention to single-family residences and are equipped to make loans in this area.

Some of the most important characteristics of a savings and loan association are that:

1. It is generally a locally owned and privately managed home financing institution.
2. It receives individuals' savings and uses these funds to make long-term amortized loans to home purchasers.
3. It makes loans for the construction, purchase, repair, or refinancing of houses.
4. It is state or federally chartered.

=== Differences from savings banks ===
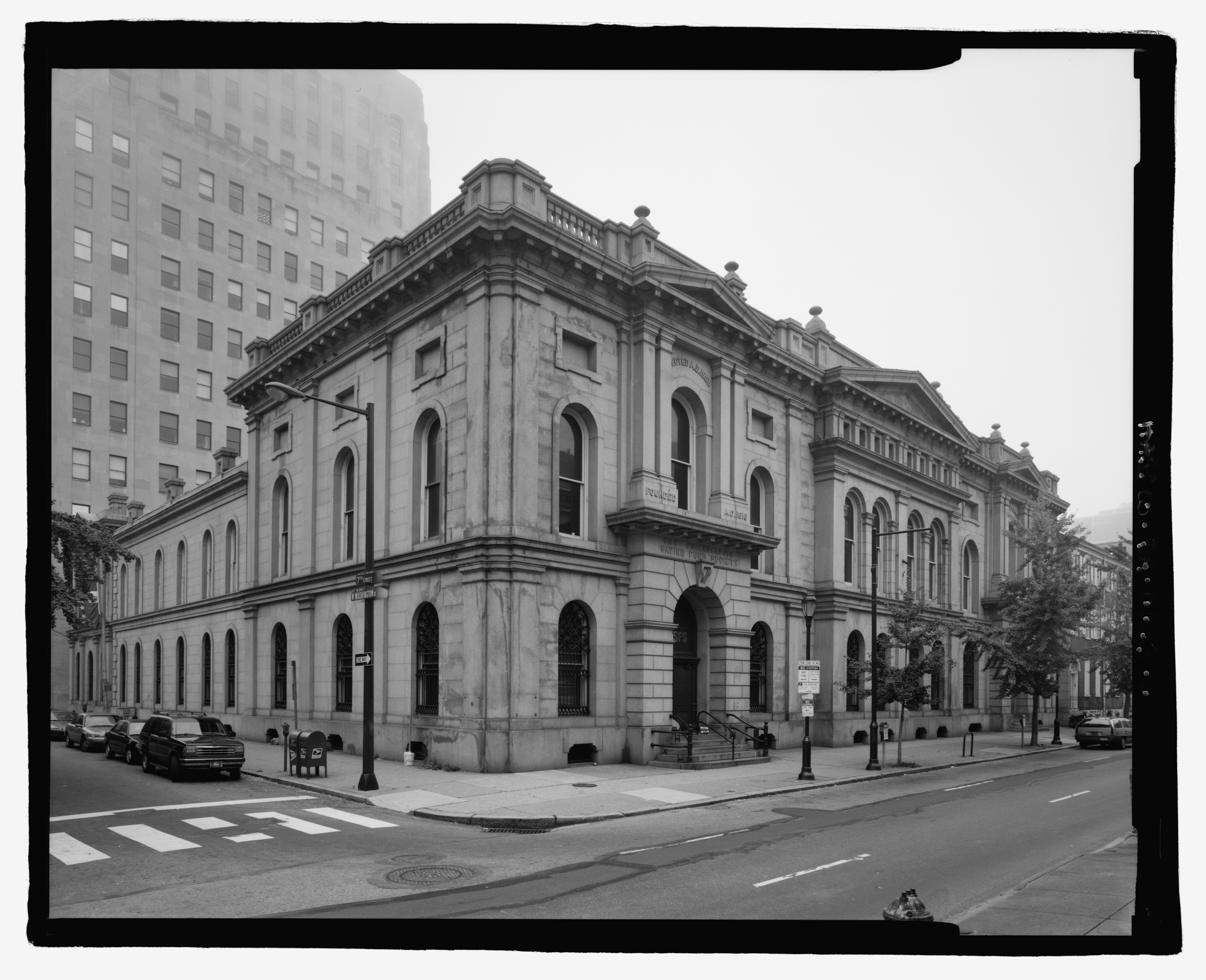
PSFS Building, Walnut and Seventh Streets, Philadelphia.

Accounts at savings banks were insured by the FDIC. When the Western Savings Bank of Philadelphia failed in 1982, it was the FDIC that arranged its absorption into the Philadelphia Savings Fund Society (PSFS). Savings banks were limited by law to only offer savings accounts and to make their income from mortgages and student loans. Savings banks could pay one-third of 1% higher interest on savings than could a commercial bank. PSFS circumvented this by offering "payment order" accounts which functioned as checking accounts and were processed through the Fidelity Bank of Pennsylvania. The rules were loosened so that savings banks could offer automobile loans, credit cards, and actual checking accounts. In time PSFS became a full commercial bank.

Accounts at savings and loans were insured by the FSLIC. Some savings and loans did become savings banks, such as First Federal Savings Bank of Pontiac in Michigan. What gave away their heritage was that their accounts continued to be insured by the FSLIC.

Savings and loans accepted deposits and used those deposits, along with other capital that was in their possession, to make loans. What was revolutionary was that the management of the savings and loan was determined by those that held deposits and in some instances had loans. The amount of influence in the management of the organization was determined based on the amount on deposit with the institution.

The overriding goal of the savings and loan association was to encourage savings and investment by common people and to give them access to a financial intermediary that otherwise had not been open to them in the past. The savings and loan was also there to provide loans for the purchase of large ticket items, usually homes, for worthy and responsible borrowers. The early savings and loans were in the business of "neighbors helping neighbors".

== See also ==
- Cooperative banking
- Credit union
