= Hudson City Bancorp =

Hudson City Bancorp, Inc.
- Type: Subsidiary
- Traded as: Nasdaq: HCBK
- Founded: March 27, 1868; 158 years ago
- Defunct: November 1, 2015
- Fate: Acquired
- Successor: M&T Bank
- Headquarters: Paramus, New Jersey, U.S., United States
- Number of locations: 135
- Area served: New Jersey, New York, Connecticut
- Services: Bank holding company
- Website: www.hcsbonline.com

Hudson City Bancorp, Inc., based in Paramus, in the U.S. state of New Jersey, was a bank-holding company for Hudson City Savings Bank, its only subsidiary, then the largest savings bank in New Jersey and one of the oldest banks in the United States, with US$50 billion in assets. It was a fully publicly held entity and a former member of the S&P 500 stock market Index. In 2005, its US$3.93 billion secondary offering of common stock was the largest in United States banking history. At the time, it was also the seventh largest domestic public offering in United States history The bank avoided the excesses of the housing boom and was labeled "best bank of 2007" by Forbes. M&T Bank agreed to acquire Hudson City on August 27, 2012.

The company was located at West 80 Century Road, in Paramus, New Jersey.

== Hudson City Savings Bank ==
On March 27, 1868, the Hudson City Savings Bank received a charter from the New Jersey Legislature to open in what was then the small Hudson City, New Jersey. Garrett D. Van Reipen, the city's first mayor, became the first president of the small bank.

By the early 1870s, the city of Hudson was annexed by Jersey City, New Jersey, the second-largest city in the state. By the end of the 19th century, the bank had accumulated assets and deposits of over $1 million. In January 1918, Robert J. Rendall became the savings bank's president, and by his death in 1950 he had become one of the longest serving presidents in the company's history.

In the 1920s, Hudson City Savings Bank opened its second branch office, and moved from the old headquarters on Newark Avenue, to 587 Summit Avenue in Jersey City. The company survived the aftermath of the stock market crash of 1929 when many other banks closed. By the end of the Great Depression of the 1930s, it had accumulated US$11 million in assets and held US$800,000 in reserves. By the end of the 1940s, the savings bank had opened at least three Jersey City branches, with over US$26 million in assets.

In August 1950, President Robert J. Rendall died. During the 1950s, New Jersey's growth rate was double the national average, boosting the savings bank's growth as well: by 1959, Hudson City Savings Bank had accumulated over US$50 million in assets. In 1968, Kenneth L. Birchby became president and CEO of the bank. By the late 1960s, New Jersey's banking laws made it legal for banks to operate across county lines. In 1969, the bank opened its fifth branch, and its first branch across the county line at Waldwick, in Bergen County, New Jersey. The bank's total assets by then had reached US$175 million.

During the long-term declining market and economic malaise of the 1970s the bank grew to 37 branches in 12 New Jersey counties. In 1978, the headquarters moved to neighboring Bergen County, New Jersey. By that time, the bank had accumulated total assets and deposits of over US$1.1 billion each. In 1981, Leonard S. Gudelski became president. The bank survived the troubles surrounding double-digit inflation and interest rates, and also survived the following early 1980s recession and the later 1980s Savings and Loan crisis when many other banks and savings and loans failed.

In 1988, Ronald E. Hermance, Jr. was hired at Hudson City Savings as senior executive vice president and chief operating officer. He had previously been chief financial officer of Southold Savings Bank on Long Island, New York. By the end of 1989, Hudson City Savings Bank had 69 branches and total assets of US$3.2 billion. In 1992, following the 1990-1991 recession, the bank became the largest savings bank in New Jersey. In 1996, Leonard S. Gudelski was elected chairman, and also retained his position as president through that year.

In January 1997, Ronald E. Hermance, Jr. was promoted to replace Gudelski as the 11th president of the bank. Gudelski remained as chairman. As of January 1, 2011, there were 136 branch offices, nine in Fairfield County, Connecticut, 29 in New York State, and 98 in New Jersey spanning Bergen, Passaic, Morris, Warren, Essex, Hudson, Union, Somerset, Middlesex, Mercer, Monmouth, Ocean, Burlington, Camden, Atlantic, and Gloucester counties.

== Hudson City Bancorp ==
In February 1999, the bank initiated a plan of reorganization as a wholly owned subsidiary of Hudson City Bancorp, Inc. The company issued stock for the first time, raising over US$500 million of new capital. Assets exceeded $8 billion by then. On July 13, 1999, Hudson City Bancorp, Inc., was formally recognized by the United States Federal Reserve as the bank holding company for the savings bank. Ronald E. Hermance, Jr., retained his position as president and also was promoted from COO to CEO of the new holding company.

On January 1, 2004, the company was changed from a bank holding company to a Domestic Entity Other as categorized by the Federal Reserve System, defined generically as a domestic institution that engages in the business of banking in the United States. The move was in preparation for its huge stock offering, the company's second-step mutual-to-stock conversion. On January 1, 2005, Ronald Hermance, Jr., replaced Gudelski as chairman, as well as retaining his existing positions as president and CEO. In 2004, he had also begun serving on the board of directors of the Federal Home Loan Bank of New York.

On June 8, 2005, the company made the largest public stock offering in the history of the United States banking industry, represented by Thacher Proffitt. The conversion from the mutual holding company structure made Hudson City Bancorp a fully publicly held entity. In the public offering, 393 million shares were sold at $10.00 per share. The company also split its existing stock 3.206-for-one. The new Hudson City Bancorp shares traded on the NASDAQ under the ticker symbol HCBK.

By 2007, Hudson City Savings Bank had become the largest New Jersey–based savings bank, and the third largest savings and loan association in the United States, with over US$35 billion in assets, over 100 branches in New Jersey, New York and Connecticut, and with over 1,300 employees. On February 14, 2007, the company was added to the S&P 500 Index by Standard & Poor's, where it replaced American Power Conversion Corporation

=== Financial and legal problems ===
During the subprime mortgage crisis, Hudson City was cited as an example of good management. They continued to require a good credit score and down payments of 10 to 20 percent, and avoided "exotic mortgages" allowing no income verification and/or no down-payment. Forbes called the bank the "best managed bank of 2007." Hudson City was the largest American bank to refuse federal bailout money, which unfortunately led to its downfall. While initially better off, the other large banks offloaded their bad loans to the government, leaving Hudson City with more debt than their competitors. While not plagued by the credit quality of its loans, by 2012 the bank was weakened as the continued lower mortgage rates encouraged a wave of refinancing to the lower rates.

Hudson City was successful in avoiding the mortgage and banking meltdown made by prudent lending. However, "actions taken by the government to rescue the banking system proved to be Hudson City's undoing." It borrowed at 4% in 2005 and successfully avoided the rise in interest rates in 2006 but suffered from an unprecedented reduction in interest rates implemented by the Fed to bail out the banking system. Its portfolio of jumbo loans was previously ineligible to refinance into a conforming loan, giving the bank a stable long-term asset base. After the housing crisis, the rules changed raising the conforming limit, which enabled the high credit quality jumbo loans to refinance to the lower rate available to GSE-purchased mortgages. The lengthy foreclosure process left Hudson City with a large number of non-performing loans. A loss of high-quality borrowers, an inability to issue new mortgages at reasonable rates, and a portfolio of non-performing loans encouraged the bank to accept a buy-out.

On September 12, 2014, after the death of Ronald Hermance, Hudson City Bancorp appointed Denis J. Salamone as chief executive officer in accordance with the company's succession plan.

In September 2015 the corporation agreed to a settlement of $5,500,000 for mortgage lending practices which discriminated against largely Black and Latin-American neighborhoods.

== M&T acquisition ==
On August 27, 2012, Hudson City Bancorp agreed to a buy-out by Buffalo, New York–based M&T Bank for $3.7 billion. M&T was to gain $25 billion in deposits and $28 billion in loans, along with 135 branch locations, 97 of which are located in New Jersey. Thereafter, Hudson City Bancorp became a better buyer of all specified pools. The buy-out was delayed for more than three years due to concerns by the Federal Reserve Board about M&T's anti-money laundering compliance.

The Federal Reserve finally approved the acquisition in September 2015, and on November 1, 2015, Hudson City Bancorp became an M&T subsidiary. At 1,129 days, it is by far the longest delayed bank merger in history. Since November 1, Hudson City has operated as a subsidiary of M&T. M&T plans to completely integrate and rebrand branch locations by February 16.
