= Federal Home Loan Banks =

11 U.S. government-sponsored banks

Location of the territories for the 11 (previously 12) FHLBanks, post-merger of the Seattle and Des Moines banks in 2015

The Federal Home Loan Banks (FHLBanks, or FHLBank System) are 11 U.S. government-sponsored banks that provide liquidity to financial institutions to support housing finance and other forms of community investment. FHLBanks are located in the cities of Atlanta, Boston, Chicago, Cincinnati, Dallas, Des Moines, Indianapolis, New York, Pittsburgh, San Francisco, and Topeka.

== Overview ==
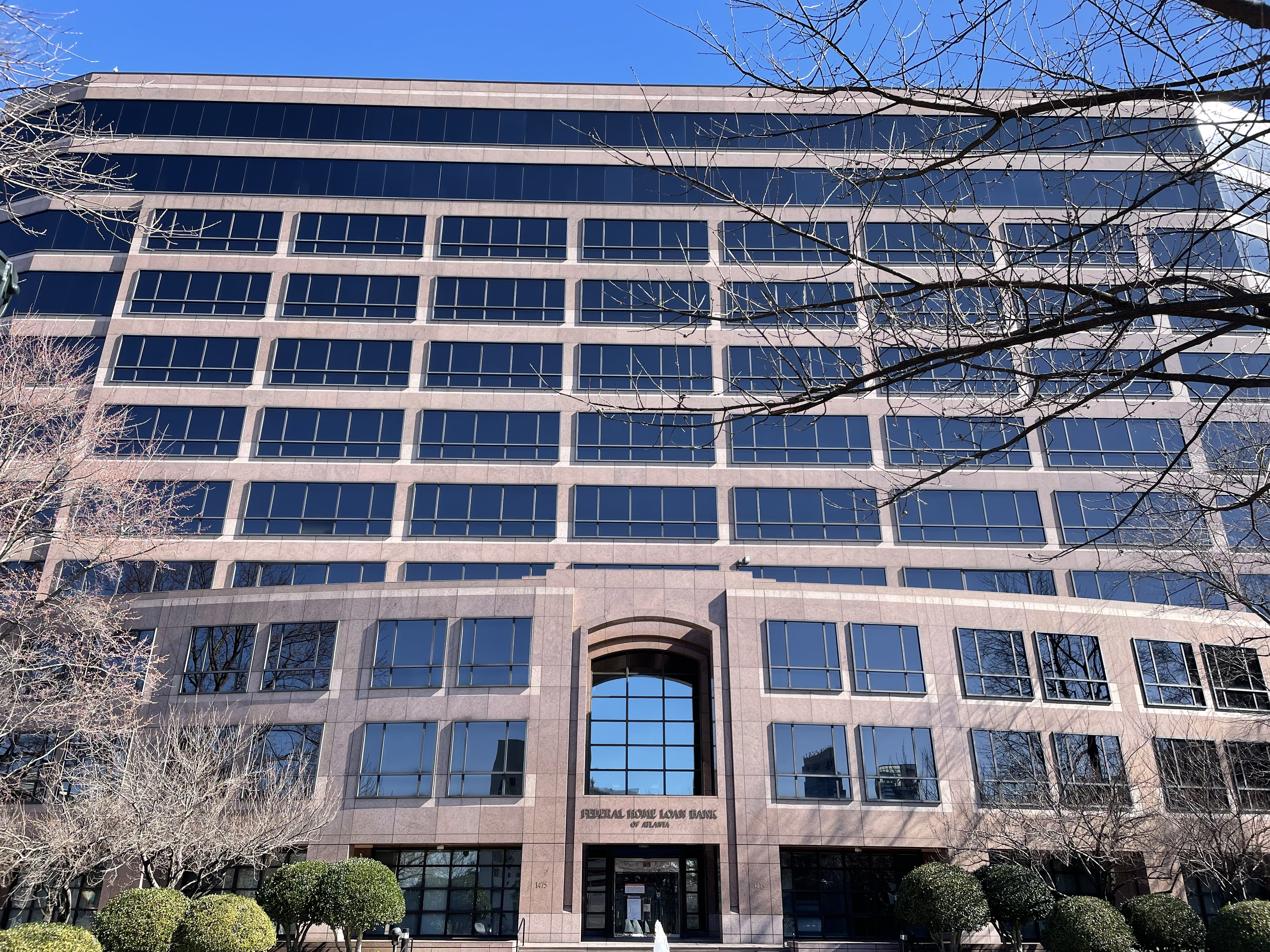
Federal home loan bank Atlanta

The FHLBank System was chartered by Congress in 1932, during the Great Depression. It has a primary mission of providing member financial institutions with financial products/services which assist and enhance the financing of housing and community lending. FHLBanks operate exclusively in the secondary market providing loans (advances) to financial institutions, not individuals.

The 11 FHLBanks are each structured as cooperatives owned and governed by their member financial institutions, which today include savings and loan associations (thrifts), commercial banks, credit unions, and insurance companies. While FHLBanks are private, the FHLBank System is directly regulated by the Federal Housing Finance Agency (FHFA) and FHLBanks enjoy certain benefits from their government sponsorship, namely an “implied guarantee” from the federal government and “Regulatory and income tax exemptions that reduce their operating costs.” The Congressional Budget Office estimated in the 2024 fiscal year that FHLBanks receive a net government subsidy of $6.9 billion.

== History ==
The FHLBanks were established during the Great Depression by the Federal Home Loan Bank Board (FHLBB) pursuant to the Federal Home Loan Bank Act of 1932. After signing the Federal Home Loan Bank Act, President Herbert Hoover gave a statement describing the purpose of the FHLBank System:

The purpose of the system is both to meet the present emergency and to build up homeownership on more favorable terms than exist today. The immediate credit situation has for the time being in many parts of the country restricted the activities of building and loan associations, savings banks, and other institutions making loans for home purposes, in such fashion that they are not only unable to extend credit for the acquirement of new homes, but in thousands of instances they have been unable to renew existing mortgages with resultant foreclosures and great hardships.

The FHLBank System was roughly structured as a Federal Reserve system for thrifts. At the time, thrifts could not join the Federal Reserve and access emergency lending through the discount window, explaining why the FHLBanks were initially needed to address emergency needs of the Great Depression. Initially, the FHLBanks made direct loans to homeowners, but the Home Owners’ Loan Act of 1933 transferred this responsibility to the newly established Home Owners' Loan Corporation and authorized the FHLBB to charter and regulate federal thrifts. In 1937, the FHLBank System issues its first consolidated obligations.

=== Statutory and regulatory changes ===
The Emergency Home Finance Act of 1970 provided the FHLBank System with $250 million to subsidize interest rates on home construction advances. In 1982, the Garn St. Germain Depository Institutions Act eliminates restrictions on collateral FHLBanks can accept.

In response to the savings and loan crisis of 1986-1995, the Financial Institutions Reform, Recovery and Enforcement Act of 1989 (FIRREA) abolished the FHLBB and transferred oversight responsibility of the FHLBanks to the Federal Housing Finance Board (FHFB) and regulatory responsibility to the Office of Thrift Supervision (OTS) in the Department of the Treasury. FIRREA also made commercial banks and credit unions eligible to be members of FHLBanks if 10% of their assets were in residential mortgages.

Due to the 2008 financial crisis and the Great Recession, the Housing and Economic Recovery Act of 2008 (HERA) replaced the FHFB with the Federal Housing Finance Agency (FHFA). The Secretary of the Treasury was authorized to purchase FHLBank debt securities in any amount through December 31, 2009, after which the limit would return to the original $4 billion. HERA also made community development financial institutions (CDFIs) eligible to be FHLBank members.

=== Mergers and splits ===
In 1946, the FHLBank of Los Angeles and FHLBank of Portland were merged to create the FHLBank of San Francisco, which was subsequently split into the FHLBank of San Francisco and FHLBank of Spokane (later Seattle) in 1963. In 2015, the FHLBank of Seattle and FHLBank of Des Moines voluntarily merged.

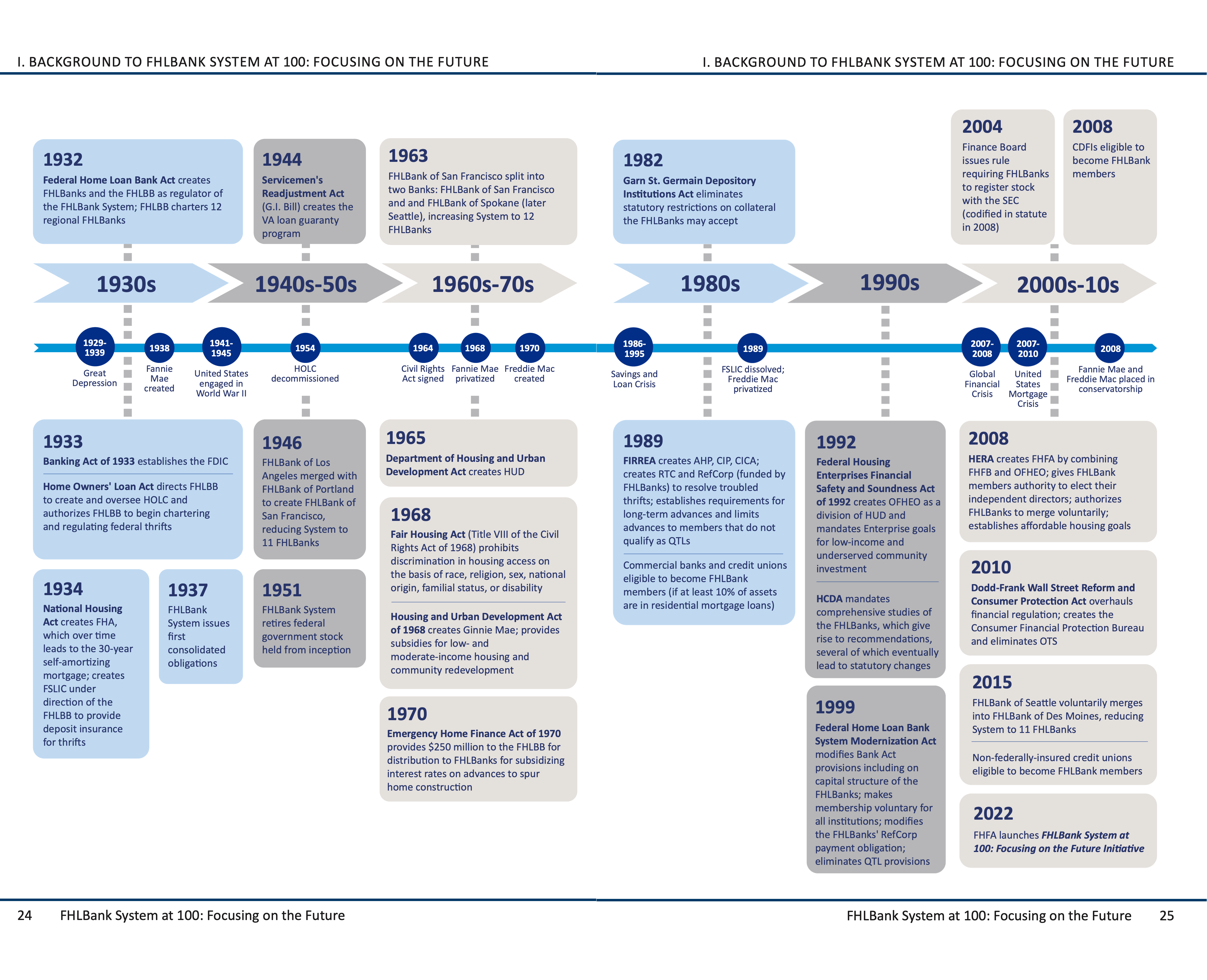
Timeline of relevant events and legislation

== Financial results and condition ==
Since August 2006, all 11 banks have been registered with the United States Securities and Exchange Commission and all financial statements and other filings are available to the public at the SEC website (EDGAR).

On August 5, 2011, the Federal Housing Finance Agency announced that the FHLBanks had satisfied their obligation to make payments related to the Resolution Funding Corporation (RefCorp) bonds. The Banks were required to pay 20 percent of their net income (after payments to the Affordable Housing Program) toward the RefCorp bond payments. Each Bank now pays 20% of its net income into its own separate restricted retained earnings account until the account equals one percent of that Bank's outstanding consolidated obligations.

== Involvement in 2023 banking crisis ==
At times, FHLBanks have been used as a “lender of next-to-last resort” providing emergency liquidity to distressed banks. Such was the case in 2023 when a few member banks with exposure to the cryptocurrency industry (Silvergate Capital Corporation, Signature Bank and Metropolitan Bank Holding Corporation) received FHLB loans in response to a run on deposit withdrawals. The FHLBank of San Francisco also loaned $30 billion to Silicon Valley Bank (SVB) prior to SVB’s collapse. According to the FHFA, “During the week beginning March 13, 2023, the FHLBanks funded $675.6 billion in advances, the largest one-week advance volume in FHLBank System history.”

These lending practices have drawn criticism for two reasons: advances to distressed banks are unrelated to the core mission activities of the FHLBank System and can obscure or worsen financial instability. Bloomberg Businessweek quoted Michael Bright, chief executive officer of the trade group Structured Finance Association and a former interim head of the Government National Mortgage Association or Ginnie Mae as saying, "It’s a strange irony. You have a lot of banks that access the FHLBs, but aren’t using advances for mortgage liquidity" Aaron Klein, Kathryn Judge, and Alan Cui from The Brookings Institution argue that “Allowing banks and thrifts to go the FHLBanks instead undermines [mechanisms for ensuring accountability at the Federal Reserve] and can allow problems at banks to fester.” Furthermore, FHLBanks demanding larger haircuts on collateral “tend[s] to exacerbate liquidity strains.”

Mark T. Williams from Boston University, in the Financial Times, point to the important on-demand liquidity and shock absorber role the FHLBanks perform in times of financial crisis. He contends that the March 2023 bank runs would have been more pronounced had such lending not been available.

As part of a comprehensive review of the FHLBank System, the FHFA noted the necessity of distinguishing the role of FHLBanks and The Federal Reserve in emergency lending situations. FHLBanks face "operational and financing limitations" which make them unfit to serve as the lender of last resort. Moreover, while FHLBanks did not incur losses on their advances, the broader financial system bears the cost “highlighting the need for greater focus by the FHLBanks on evaluating member creditworthiness and better coordination with their members’ primary regulators when a member’s financial condition is deteriorating.”

== Reforms to the FHLBank System ==
In November 2023, the FHFA released a comprehensive review titled: FHLBank System at 100: Focusing on the Future. The report articulates a vision for the future of the FHLBank System highlighting reforms to the FHLBank System’s core mission activities and operations. The proposed reforms include:

- Clarifying the FHLBank System’s core mission activities
- Creating a measure to assess FHLBank mission achievement
- Establishing incentive structures for FHLBank members to support the FHLBank System’s mission
- Ensuring FHLBanks are not the lender of last resort by establishing protocols for members to borrow from the Federal Reserve
- Improving FHLBanks’ ability to meet short-term liquidity needs with their deposit accounts
- Strengthening risk and creditworthiness assessment
- Strengthening capital management
- Prioritizing climate resilience and improving climate risk assessment
- Increasing support for housing and community development related programs
- Increasing advances for housing and community development
- Enhancing support for multi-family housing and affordable housing
- Improving the system’s operational efficiency
- Reorganizing the structure and districts of FHLBanks
- Harmonizing eligibility requirements of members
- Changing the size and composition of the Boards of Directors

As one of the first steps to the reform, the FHFA requested comment on the FHLBank System’s core mission activities in 2024, receiving 234 comments.

== See also ==
- Farm Credit System
- Government-sponsored enterprise
