= Federal Home Loan Bank Board =

U.S. government agency

- Seal

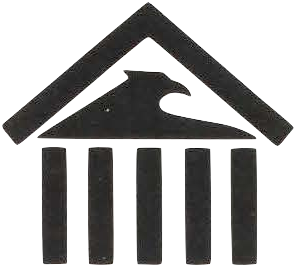
- Logo c. 1984

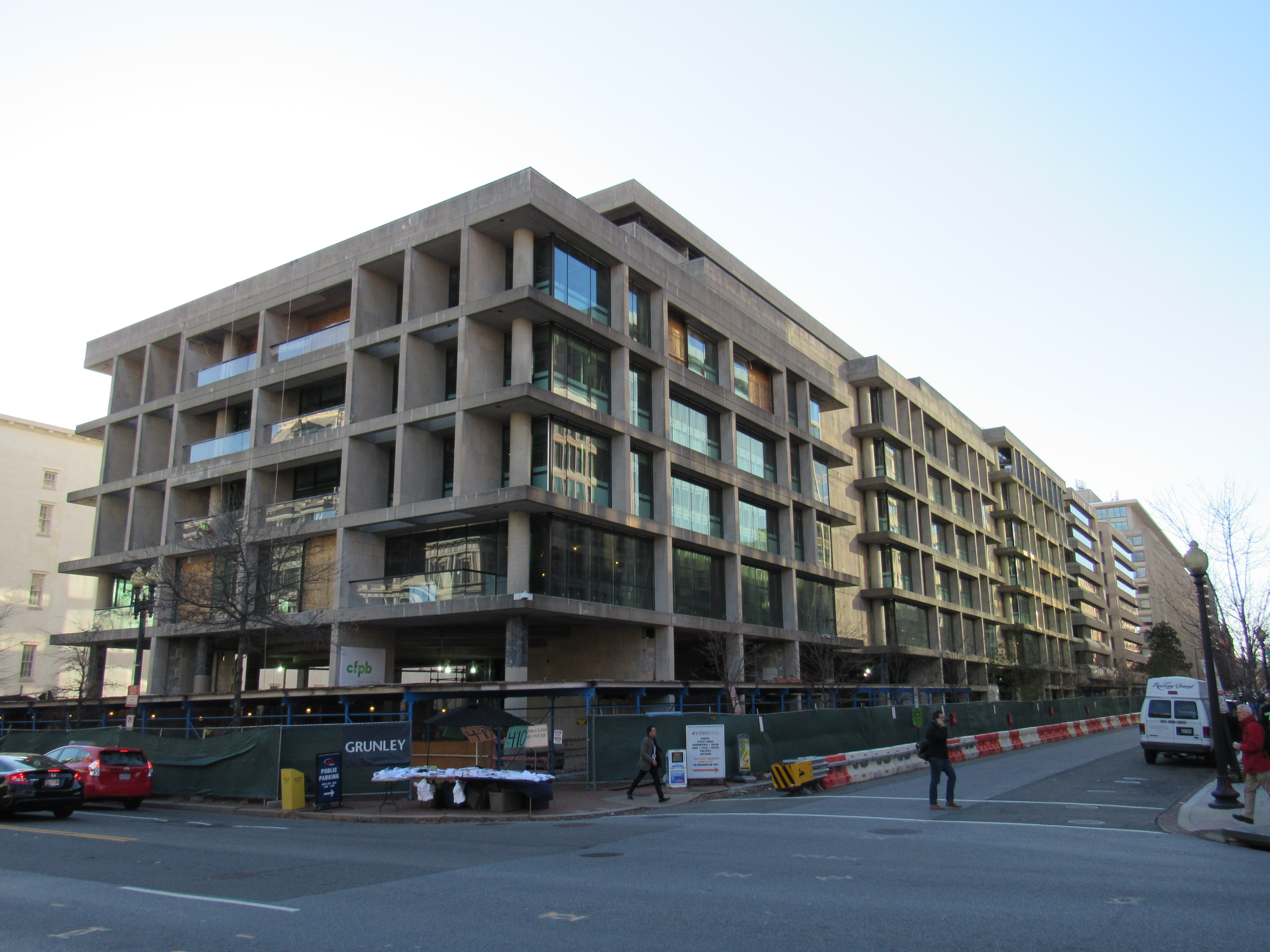
- FHLBB was headquartered in this building, now used by the CFPB

Board overview
- Formed: July 22, 1932
- Dissolved: October 8, 1989
- Superseding agencies: Federal Housing Finance Board; Office of Thrift Supervision; Federal Deposit Insurance Corporation (FSLIC responsibilities)
- Type: Independent financial regulatory agency
- Jurisdiction: United States federal government
- Headquarters: 1700 G St NW, Washington, DC

The Federal Home Loan Bank Board (FHLBB) was a U.S. board created by the Federal Home Loan Bank Act in 1932 that governed the Federal Home Loan Banks (FHLB or FHLBanks), also created by the act; the Federal Savings and Loan Insurance Corporation (FSLIC); and nationally-chartered thrifts. It was abolished and superseded by the Federal Housing Finance Board and the Office of Thrift Supervision in 1989 due to the savings and loan crisis of the 1980s, as Federal Home Loan Banks gave favorable lending to the thrifts it regulated, leading to regulatory capture.

== Activities ==
Looking to create a secondary mortgage market dedicated to buying loans from their constituent thrifts, the FHLBanks and board successfully lobbied for the creation of Freddie Mac, instead of an expanded Fannie Mae (which was limited to FHA insured loans), to be owned and controlled by the FHLBanks and the Federal Home Loan Bank Board and which would buy and sell loans from thrifts only.

== Organizational history ==
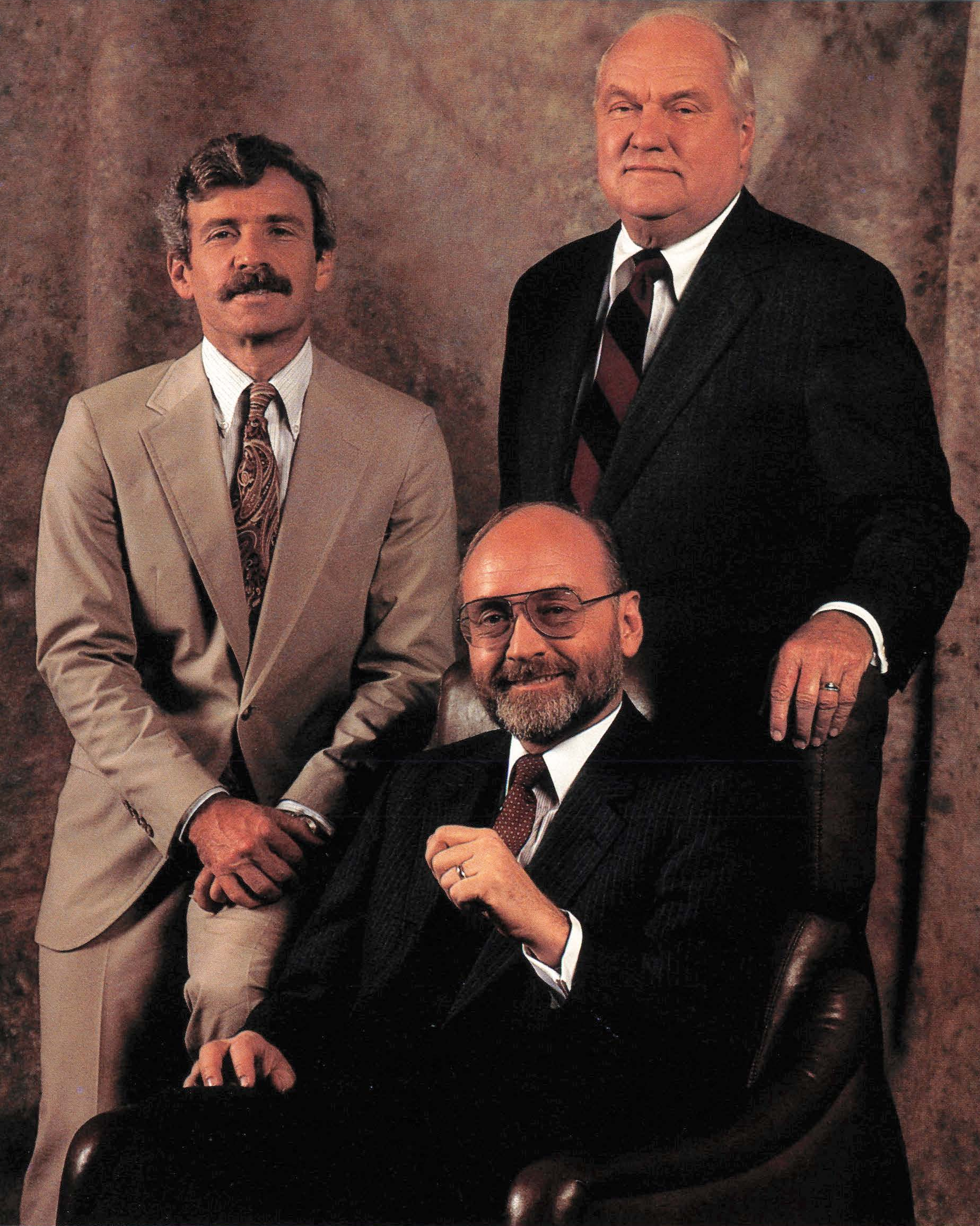
The final FHLBB members were chairman M. Danny Wall (center), Lawrence J. White (left) and Roger F. Martin (right), pictured here in FHLBB's 1987 annual report

The FHLBB was established as an independent agency by the Federal Home Loan Bank Act, July 22, 1932. The Home Owners' Loan Corporation was established as an emergency agency under FHLBB supervision by the Home Owners' Loan Act of 1933, June 13, 1933. FHLBB and its components (Federal Home Loan Bank System, Federal Savings and Loan System, Federal Savings and Loan Insurance Corporation, and Home Owners' Loan Corporation) were made part of newly established Federal Loan Agency by Reorganization Plan No. I of 1939, effective July 1, 1939.

FHLBB was abolished and its functions and components assigned to the Federal Home Loan Bank Administration (FHLBA) in the newly established National Housing Agency, by EO 9070, February 24, 1942. FHLBA was abolished and its functions and components assigned to Home Loan Bank Board (HLBB) in the newly created Housing and Home Finance Agency, by Reorganization Plan No. 3 of 1947, effective July 27, 1947. HLBB was made an independent agency and redesignated as the FHLBB by the Housing Amendments of 1955 (69 Stat. 640), August 11, 1955.

This redesignated FHLBB was abolished effective October 8, 1989, by the Financial Institutions Reform, Recovery, and Enforcement Act of 1989 (FIRREA). The Office of Thrift Supervision would regulate the thrift industry, while the Federal Housing Finance Board would manage the federal home loan banks.

== See also ==
- List of financial supervisory authorities by country
