= Homeowners Refinancing Act =

US housing legislation passed in 1933

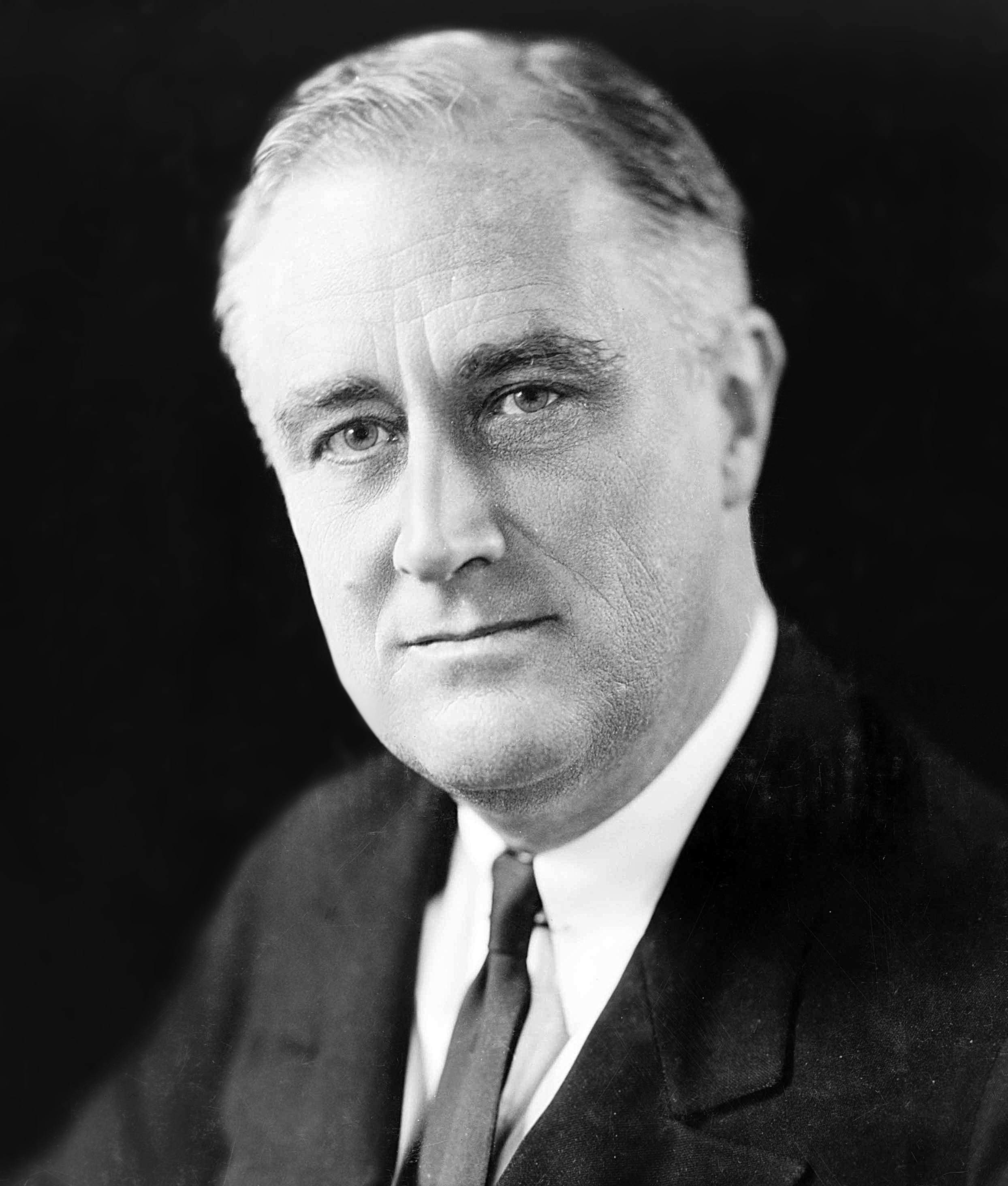
Franklin D. Roosevelt in 1933

The Homeowners Refinancing Act (also known as the Home Owners' Loan Act of 1933 and the Home Owners' Loan Corporation Act) was an Act of Congress of the United States passed as part of Franklin Delano Roosevelt's New Deal during the Great Depression to help those in danger of losing their homes. The act, which went into effect on June 13, 1933, provided mortgage assistance to homeowners or would-be homeowners by providing them money or refinancing mortgages.

Sponsored by Senate Majority Leader Joe T. Robinson of Arkansas, it also created the Home Owners' Loan Corporation (HOLC), building on Herbert Hoover's Federal Loan Bank Board. The Corporation lent low-interest money to families in danger of losing their homes to foreclosure. By the mid-1930s, the HOLC had refinanced nearly 20% of urban homes in the country.

== History ==
=== New Deal ===
Having won a decisive victory in the United States presidential election of 1932, and with his party having decisively swept Congressional elections across the nation, Roosevelt entered office with unprecedented political capital. Americans of all political persuasions were demanding immediate action, and Roosevelt responded with a remarkable series of new programs in the "first hundred days" of the administration, in which he met with Congress for 100 days. During those 100 days of lawmaking, Congress granted Roosevelt's every request.

=== Congressional ===
The original Home Owners' Loan Act of 1933, Pub. L. 73–43, 48 Stat. 128, was enacted June 13, 1933. The 1st Annual Report of the Federal Home Loan Bank Board refers to this act as the Home Owners' Loan Corporation Act. An unnamed act, Pub. L. 73–178, 48 Stat. 643, enacted April 27, 1934, further amended this act to guarantee the bonds of the Home Owners' Loan Corporation.

== See also ==
- Housing and Economic Recovery Act of 2008
