= Housing and Economic Recovery Act of 2008 =

US act of congress to address the subprime mortgage crisis

Citations
- Public law: Pub. L. 110–289 (text) (PDF)
- Statutes at Large: 122 Stat. 2654

Legislative history
- Introduced in the House by Nancy Pelosi (D–CA) on July 30, 2007; Signed into law by President George W. Bush on July 30, 2008

United States Supreme Court cases
- Collins v. Yellen, No. 19-422, 594 U.S. ___ (2021)

The United States Housing and Economic Recovery Act of 2008 (commonly referred to as HERA) was designed primarily to address the subprime mortgage crisis by stabilizing the housing market and reforming predatory lending practices. It emerged as a bipartisan compromise in Congress during increasing pressure to respond to the rapidly evolving crisis. It was intended to restore confidence in Fannie Mae and Freddie Mac by strengthening regulations and injecting capital into the two large U.S. suppliers of mortgage funding. States were authorized to refinance subprime loans using mortgage revenue bonds. Enactment of the Act led to the government conservatorship of Fannie Mae and Freddie Mac.

== Background ==
The early 2000s saw an increase in banks financing mortgages through bond markets, through a process known as "securitization." This increased lending to consumers, often homes they could not afford, and a spike in non-government insured loans. Additionally, securitized loans created conditions where the lender had no stake in whether the loan was paid back or not. Market incentives encouraged loan originators to make loans with riskier terms to make higher profits. This led to an increase in "subprime" loans, for borrowers with low credit, and an elevated default risk. Furthermore, adjustable-rate mortgages would initially offer low interest rates to consumers that would reset to much higher rates later. By the summer of 2008, there was a wave of foreclosures, leading to an overflow in the housing market, and prices driven down. Lenders and investors participating in mortgage-backed securities lost a lot of money, families lost their homes, and many neighborhoods were filled abandoned homes.

== Legislative history ==
The Housing and Economic Recovery Act of 2008 was introduced in the House on July 30, 2007. HR 3221 began as the New Direction for Energy Independence, National Security, and Consumer Protection Act, before the Senate deleted the energy language. Senate leadership did this to avoid the requirement that tax provisions must originate in the House.

The initial bill passed in the Senate on April 10, 2008 was a bipartisan compromise, crafted largely by Senators Dodd and Shelby, focused on overhauling the Federal Housing Administration's (FHA) lending policies and providing tax benefits to businesses hurt by the mortgage crisis.

On May 8, 2008, the House of Representatives passed a broader version of the Senate bill, including a new independent regulator for the Government Sponsored Entities (GSEs), an affordable-housing fund, and an expanded Federal Housing Administration (FHA) refinancing program.

There was substantial opposition to the bill composed by many Republican members of Congress. They argued that funding reduced mortgages insured by the Federal Housing Administration (FHA) was incentivizing irresponsible financial behavior while American taxpayers foot the bill.

By mid-July 2008, Treasury Secretary Henry M. Paulson urged Congress to provide the Treasury with the authority to inject capital into Fannie Mae and potentially place them under conservatorship. The Secretary urged President Bush to sign the bill to prevent Fannie and Freddie Mac from failing.

The Act was passed by the United States Congress on July 24, 2008 and signed by President George W. Bush on July 30, 2008.

=== Subsequent amendments ===
Some provisions of the law were modified by the American Recovery and Reinvestment Act of 2009, which was signed into law by President Obama on February 17, 2009.

== Federal Housing Finance Agency ==
The Act also established the Federal Housing Finance Agency (FHFA) out of the Federal Housing Finance Board (FHFB) and Office of Federal Housing Enterprise Oversight (OFHEO).

Through the powers granted to FHFA, created by the Act, on September 7, 2008, FHFA director James B. Lockhart III announced he had put Fannie Mae and Freddie Mac under the conservatorship of the FHFA. The action is "one of the most sweeping government interventions in private financial markets in decades".

== Subtitles of the Act ==
=== Housing Assistance Tax Act of 2008 ===
Included a first-time home buyer refundable tax credit for purchases on or after April 9, 2008 and before July 1, 2009 equal to 10 percent of the purchase price of a principal residence, up to $7,500.

- Phased out the credit for taxpayers with incomes over $75,000 ($150,000 for joint returns).
- Required taxpayers receiving the credit to repay it over 15 years in equal installments by imposing a surcharge on the taxpayers' annual income tax.

The Act provided emergency assistance for the redevelopment of abandoned and foreclosed homes.

=== FHA Modernization Act of 2008 ===
An FHA loan is a mortgage loan whose repayment is guaranteed by the Federal Housing Administration (FHA).

The Act:

- Increased the FHA loan limit from 95 percent to 110 percent of area median home price up to 150 percent of the GSE conforming loan limit, or $625,000), effective January 1, 2009.
- Required a down payment of at least 3.5 percent for any FHA loan.

Limited of regulation can Placed a 12-month moratorium second U.S. Dept. of Housing and Urban Development implementation of risk-based premiums.

- Prohibited seller-funded down payments.

=== Federal Housing Finance Regulatory Reform Act of 2008 ===
==== Establishment of the Federal Housing Finance Agency ====
This statute established the Federal Housing Finance Agency (FHFA) as an independent federal agency to regulate and oversee the operations of Fannie Mae, Freddie Mac, and the Federal Home Loan Bank System to promote efficient and resilient national housing finance markets so low to middle income families can afford mortgages. The Director of the Agency is to serve for a five-year term and is given authority to ensure that the regulated entities have adequate capital on hand and are aligned with the public interest.

==== Federal Housing Finance Oversight Board ====
This act established the Federal Housing Finance Oversight Board to advise the Director of the FHFA on overall strategies and policies. This board consists of the Secretary of the Treasury, the Secretary of Housing and Urban Development, the Chairman of the Securities and Exchange Commission, and the Director of the FHFA. This is distinct from the Federal Housing Finance Board, which this legislation abolished.

==== Temporary Authority for Purchase of Obligations of Regulated Entities by Secretary of Treasury ====
This section of the law granted authority to the Treasury Secretary to purchase securities issued by the Fannie Mae and Freddie Mac for the purpose of stabilizing the financial markets, avoiding interruptions in mortgage lending, and safeguarding taxpayer interests. In return, the Treasury Secretary had to take steps to ensure that government investment was protected by prioritizing repayment to the government, imposing limits on dividends to other shareholders, and restricting executive compensation.

=== HOPE for Homeowners Act of 2008 ===
- Authorized the FHA to insure up to $300 billion of 30-year fixed rate refinance loans up to 90% of appraised value for distressed borrowers.

Covered mortgage commitments made on or before January 1, 2008.

- Required existing mortgage holders to accept the proceeds of the insured loan as payment in full for all pre-existing indebtedness.
- Lender participation in this program was not required but voluntary to cover financial.

As of February 2009, only 451 applications had been received and 25 loans finalized, far short of the estimated 400,000 homeowners who were expected to participate. This was attributed to high fees, high interest rates, the need for a reduction in principal on the part of the lender, and the requirement that the federal government receive 50% of any appreciation in value of the house. Congress began hearings on the program in February.

=== Mortgage Disclosure Improvement Act of 2008 ===
The Mortgage Disclosure Improvement Act (MDIA) provided amendments to the Truth in Lending Act. This act mandated that borrowers receive early, specific disclosures for mortgage loans secured by properties other than the consumer's main residence. The act required a seven day waiting period between the time the disclosure is provided and the loan's closing date.

=== Secure and Fair Enforcement for Mortgage Licensing Act of 2008 ===
"Secure and Fair Enforcement for Mortgage Licensing Act" (12 United States Code, Section 5100, et seq.), passed by Congress and signed by President G.W. Bush in 2008, required all states to implement a Mortgage Loan Originator (MLO) licensing and registration system by August 1, 2009 (August 1, 2010 for legislatures that meet biennially). States can operate their own systems, subject to stringent federal standards, or they can participate in the Nationwide Multi-State Licensing System and Registry (NMLS), a service operated jointly by the Conference of State Bank Supervisors and the American Association of Residential Mortgage Regulators (CSBS/AARMR). If the state's licensing and registration program does not meet minimum standards at any time, the U.S. Department of Housing and Urban Development (HUD) is empowered to step in and impose a compliant system upon the state.

The objectives of the SAFE Act include aggregating and improving the flow of information to and between regulators; providing increased accountability and tracking of MLOs; enhancing consumer protections; supporting anti-fraud measures; and providing consumers with easily accessible information at no charge regarding the employment history of and publicly adjudicated disciplinary and enforcement actions against MLOs.

Upon registration, MLOs are provided with a Unique Identifier number. All MLOs and their employers are required to provide this unique identifier to anyone who requests it, and the federally chartered mortgage institutions, Fannie Mae and Freddie Mac, require that it be placed on all loan documents for loans that they purchase. Consumers will be able to use this number to obtain basic information on any registered MLO. This information includes name and aliases, employment history, current employment and contact information, negative civil judgments or settlements, and disciplinary and criminal history.

The Act and the implementing regulations, which were issued jointly by the federal banking agencies in 2010, define a "mortgage loan originator" as any individual who both takes residential loan applications and "offers or negotiates" residential mortgage loan terms. Additionally, the individual must undertake these activities for economic gain (i.e., get paid for it). Persons who perform merely clerical or administrative tasks in connection with loan origination are not considered MLOs. The terms, "taking a mortgage loan application" and "offering or negotiating terms" are defined very broadly so that just about any person in the underwriting process who has more than cursory contact with a potential borrower is an MLO. Mortgage loans include financing and refinancing transactions, reverse mortgages, home equity lines of credit and just about any other credit transaction secured by a first or junior lien on a dwelling.

Not all persons who qualify as MLOs are required to become licensed or to register with the newly renamed Nationwide Multi-State Licensing System and Registry (NMLS). Licensed Realtors and MLOs who work for federally regulated financial institutions, for example, are not required to be licensed as MLOs, although they are required to register. Those who would otherwise be required to register are exempted if they have:

1. Never been registered before and,
2. Perform five or fewer mortgage loan originations in any rolling twelve-month period.

Registration must be renewed annually, and registrants must submit fingerprints for a criminal background check along with their first registration application.

== See also ==
- Homeowners Refinancing Act (1933)
