= Federal Housing Finance Agency =

U.S. federal agency

- Seal

Agency overview
- Formed: July 30, 2008
- Preceding agencies: Federal Housing Finance Board; Office of Federal Housing Enterprise Oversight
- Employees: ~731 (2019)
- Agency executive: Bill Pulte, Director
- Website: fhfa.gov

The Federal Housing Finance Agency (FHFA) is an independent federal agency in the United States created as the successor regulatory agency of the Federal Housing Finance Board (FHFB), the Office of Federal Housing Enterprise Oversight (OFHEO), and the U.S. Department of Housing and Urban Development government-sponsored enterprise mission team, absorbing the powers and regulatory authority of both entities, with expanded legal and regulatory authority, including the ability to place government-sponsored enterprises (GSEs) into receivership or conservatorship.

In its role as regulator, it regulates Fannie Mae, Freddie Mac, and the 11 Federal Home Loan Banks (FHLBanks, or FHLBank System). It is wholly separate from the Federal Housing Administration, which largely provides mortgage insurance.

In September 2019, the Fifth Circuit Court of Appeals, in an en banc opinion, ruled that the structure of the FHFA violated constitutional separation of powers because its director could not be removed by the president. The U.S. Supreme Court affirmed that part of the holding.

== History ==
The law establishing the FHFA is the Federal Housing Finance Regulatory Reform Act of 2008, which is Division A of the larger Housing and Economic Recovery Act of 2008, Public Law 110-289, signed on July 30, 2008 by President George W. Bush. One year after the law was signed, the OFHEO and the FHFB went out of existence. All existing regulations, orders and decisions of OFHEO and the Finance Board remain in effect until modified or superseded.

On the day of the law's signing, former Director James Lockhart stated:

For more than two years as Director of OFHEO I have worked to help create FHFA so that this new GSE regulator has far greater authorities than its predecessors. As Director of FHFA, I commit that we will use these authorities to ensure that the housing GSEs provide stability and liquidity to the mortgage market, support affordable housing and operate safely and soundly.

FHFA director Lockhart transmitted a "notice of establishment," for publication in the Federal Register on September 4, 2008. The notice formally announced the agency's existence and authority to act.

=== Conservatorships ===
On September 7, 2008, FHFA director Lockhart announced he had put Fannie Mae and Freddie Mac under the conservatorship of the FHFA. The action was "one of the most sweeping government interventions in private financial markets in decades". U.S. Treasury Secretary Henry M. Paulson, appearing at the same press conference, stated that placing the two GSEs into conservatorship was a decision he fully supported, and said that he advised "that conservatorship was the only form in which I would commit taxpayer money to the GSEs." He further said that "I attribute the need for today's action primarily to the inherent conflict and flawed business model embedded in the GSE structure, and to the ongoing housing correction."

In the announcement, Lockhart indicated the following items in the plan of action for the conservatorship:

1. On September 8, 2008, the first day of the conservatorship, business will be conducted normally, with stronger backing for the holders of Mortgage Backed Securities (MBS), senior debt and subordinated debt.
2. The Enterprises will be allowed to grow their guarantee MBS books without limits and continue to purchase replacement securities for their portfolios, about $20 billion per month, without capital constraints.
3. As the conservator, the FHFA will assume the power of the Board and management.
4. The present CEOs have been dismissed, but will stay on to help with the transition.
5. Appointed as CEOs are Herb Allison, for Fannie Mae and David M. Moffett for Freddie Mac. Allison is former Vice Chairman of Merrill Lynch and for the last eight years chairman of TIAA-CREF. Moffett is the former Vice Chairman and CFO of US Bancorp. Their compensation will be significantly lower than the outgoing CEOs. They will be joined by equally strong non-executive chairmen.
6. Other management action will be very limited. The new CEOs agreed it is important to work with the current management teams and employees to encourage them to stay and to continue to make important improvements to the Enterprises.
7. To conserve over $2 billion annually in capital the common stock and preferred stock dividends will be eliminated, but the common and all preferred stocks will continue to remain outstanding. Subordinated debt interest and principal payments will continue to be made.
8. All political activities, including all lobbying, will be halted immediately. Charitable activities will be reviewed.
9. There will be financing and investing relationship with the U.S. Treasury via three different financing facilities, to provide critically needed support to Freddie Mac and Fannie Mae and the liquidity of the mortgage market. One of the three facilities is a secured liquidity facility which will be not only for Fannie Mae and Freddie Mac, and also for the 12 Federal Home Loan Banks that FHFA also regulates.

=== Suits against financial institutions ===
The FHFA in 2011 filed suit first against UBS then against 17 other financial institutions accusing them of misrepresenting about $200 billion in mortgage-backed securities sold to Fannie Mae and Freddie Mac. The suits, some of which name individual defendants, allege a variety of violations of federal securities law and common law and paint "a damning portrait of the excesses of the housing bubble." The suits seek a variety of damages and civil penalties.

== FHFA settlements for fraudulent sales by PLS to Fannie Mae and Freddie Mac ==
The Federal Housing Finance Agency initiated litigation against 18 financial institutions involving allegations of securities law violations and, in some instances, fraud in the sale of private-label securities (PLS) to Fannie Mae and Freddie Mac.

Below is a list of the cases, with amounts of any settlements reached in 2013 and 2014.

| General Electric Company | $6.25 million |
| CitiGroup Inc. | $250 million |
| UBS Americas, Inc. (Union Bank of Switzerland) | $885 million |
| J.P. Morgan Chase & Co. | $4 billion |
| Deutsche Bank AG | $1.925 billion |
| Ally Financial, Inc. | $475 million |
| Morgan Stanley | $1.25 billion |
| SG Americas (Societe Generale) | $122 million |
| Credit Suisse Holdings (USA) Inc. | $885 million |
| Bank of America Corp. |
| Merrill Lynch & Co. |
| Countrywide Financial Corporation | $5.83 billion |
| Barclays Bank PLC | $280 million |
| First Horizon National Corp. | $110 million |
| RBS Securities, Inc. (in Ally action) | $99.5 million |
| Goldman Sachs & Co. | $1.2 billion |
| HSBC North America Holdings, Inc. (Hong Kong Shanghai Banking Corp.) | $550 million |

Non-Litigation PLS Settlements Wells Fargo Bank, N.A. $335.23 million

== Leadership ==
Upon Lockhart's departure, Edward DeMarco was appointed Acting Director of FHFA on August 25, 2009. On May 1, 2013, President Barack Obama nominated Mel Watt as the next FHFA head. After Democrats eliminated rules allowing filibusters on executive branch nominations, the U.S. Senate confirmed Watt on December 10, 2013.

On December 21, 2018, President Donald Trump designated Comptroller of the currency Joseph Otting to be Acting Director of FHFA upon completion of Director Watt's term, effective January 7, 2019. In April 2019, Mark A. Calabria was confirmed to a five year term as director. At the time of his confirmation, the chair of the Senate Banking Committee said that Calabria had committed to working with the Senate toward ending the conservatorship over Fannie Mae and Freddie Mac.

In the Supreme Court case Collins v. Yellen, the Supreme Court ruled that, as they had in Seila Law LLC v. Consumer Financial Protection Bureau for the Consumer Financial Protection Bureau, that the inability for the President to terminate the FHFA director beyond "for cause" was unconstitutional, but otherwise left the agency's power as is. President Biden replaced Calabria with Sandra L. Thompson as Acting Director, who is expected to end Calabria's policy of phasing out the conservatorship. Biden nominated Thompson to serve as Director in May 2022, and she was sworn into a five-year term on June 22, 2022.

Thompson announced that she would resign effective January 19, 2025, shortly before the beginning of President Donald Trump's second term. Trump nominated Bill Pulte to serve as FHFA Director in January 2025. The U.S. Senate voted to confirm Pulte in a 56-43 vote, and he was sworn in on March 14, 2025. During his term at FHFA, Pulte has driven out hundreds of career officials at Fannie Mae and Freddie Mac.

== Inspector General ==
Brian M. Tomney was nominated by President Joe Biden and confirmed by the U.S. Senate to serve as Inspector General for the Federal Housing Finance Agency. Sworn into office on March 14, 2022, Tomney is the third Senate confirmed Inspector General for FHFA.

Laura S. Wertheimer was nominated as Inspector General of the Federal Housing Finance Agency by President Barack Obama and confirmed by the U.S. Senate on September 17, 2015. On June 29, 2021, Wertheimer announced she would be leaving the position on July 30, 2021. This followed calls from Republican Senators Chuck Grassley and Ron Johnson for her removal in the preceding weeks, and a critical CIGIE report released on April 29, 2021.

== See also ==
- Title 12 of the Code of Federal Regulations
- California v. Federal Housing Finance Agency
- List of financial supervisory authorities by country
