= Federal Housing Finance Board =

Independent agency in the United States

- Seal

Board overview
- Formed: December 18, 1990
- Preceding board: Federal Home Loan Bank Board (FHLBB)
- Dissolved: July 30, 2009
- Superseding board: Federal Housing Finance Agency (FHFA)

The Federal Housing Finance Board (FHFB) was an independent agency of the United States government established in 1989 in the aftermath of the savings and loan crisis to take over management of the Federal Home Loan Banks (FHLBs or FHLBanks) from the Federal Home Loan Bank Board (FHLBB), and was superseded by the Federal Housing Finance Agency (FHFA) in 2008.

The FHFB managed the nation's Federal Home Loan Banks (FHLBs). The eleven regional FHLBs are privately held government sponsored enterprises that ensure the supply of funds to local lenders that, in turn, finance loans for home mortgages.

== Operations ==
The FHFB was headquartered in Washington, D.C., and led by a five-member board. Four board members were appointed by the President for seven-year terms, and the fifth member was either the Secretary of Housing and Urban Development or the Secretary's designee.

The FHFB was entirely funded by fees assessed to Federal Home Bank Loans, and did not directly receive taxpayer funds.

== History ==
The FHFB was established by the Financial Institutions Reform, Recovery and Enforcement Act of 1989 (FIRREA) in the aftermath of the savings and loan crisis to take over oversight of the Federal Home Loan Banks (FHLBs or FHLBanks) from the Federal Home Loan Bank Board (FHLBB) while the Office of Thrift Supervision (OTS) took over most other functions of the FHLBB including regulation.

Due to the 2008 financial crisis, the Housing and Economic Recovery Act of 2008 (HERA) replaced the FHFB and the Office of Federal Housing Enterprise Oversight (OFHEO) with the Federal Housing Finance Agency (FHFA). The FHFB's existence ceased on July 30, 2009. As a result of the late-2000s recession, section 312 of the Dodd-Frank Wall Street Reform and Consumer Protection Act mandated merger of OTS with the Office of the Comptroller of the Currency (OCC), the Federal Deposit Insurance Corporation (FDIC), the Federal Reserve Board of Governors, and the Consumer Financial Protection Bureau (CFPB) as of July 21, 2011.

== See also ==
- Title 12 of the Code of Federal Regulations
