= Financial Institutions Reform, Recovery, and Enforcement Act of 1989 =

American federal law

- Acronyms (colloquial): FIRREA of 1989
- Enacted by: the 101st United States Congress
- Effective: 1989

Citations
- Public law: Pub. L. 101–73
- Statutes at Large: 103 Stat. 183

Legislative history
- Introduced in the House as "Financial Institutions Reform, Recovery and Enforcement Act of 1989" H.R. 1278 by Henry B. Gonzalez (D-TX) on March 6, 1989; Committee consideration by House Banking, Finance, and Urban Affairs, House Government Operations, House Judiciary, House Rules, House Ways and Means; Passed the House on June 15, 1989 (320–97); Passed the Senate on June 21, 1989 (Voice vote (in lieu of S. 774, passed 91–8)); Reported by the joint conference committee on August 1, 1989; agreed to by the House on August 3 and 5, 1989 (221–199 and 201–175) and by the Senate on August 4, 1989; Signed into law by President George H. W. Bush on August 9, 1989

Major amendments
- Dodd–Frank Wall Street Reform and Consumer Protection Act; Economic Growth, Regulatory Relief and Consumer Protection Act

The Financial Institutions Reform, Recovery, and Enforcement Act of 1989 (FIRREA), is a United States federal law enacted in the wake of the savings and loan crisis of the 1980s.

It established the Resolution Trust Corporation to close hundreds of insolvent thrifts and provided funds to pay out insurance to their depositors. It transferred thrift regulatory authority from the Federal Home Loan Bank Board to the Office of Thrift Supervision. It dramatically changed the savings and loan industry and its federal regulation, encouraging loan origination.

== Overview ==
FIRREA dramatically changed the savings and loan industry and its federal regulation, including deposit insurance. The "Paulson Blueprint" summarized it in the following:

1. The Federal Home Loan Bank Board (FHLBB) was abolished.
2. The Federal Savings and Loan Insurance Corporation (FSLIC) was abolished, and all assets and liabilities were assumed by the FSLIC Resolution Fund administered by the FDIC and funded by the Financing Corporation (FICO).
3. The Office of Thrift Supervision (OTS), a bureau of the U.S. Treasury Department, was created to charter, regulate, examine, and supervise savings institutions.
4. The Federal Housing Finance Board (FHFB) was created as an independent agency to replace the FHLBB, i.e. to oversee the 12 Federal Home Loan Banks (also called district banks) that represent the largest collective source of home mortgage and community credit in the United States.
5. The Savings Association Insurance Fund (SAIF) replaced the FSLIC as an ongoing insurance fund for thrift institutions (like the FDIC, the FSLIC was a permanent corporation that insured savings and loan accounts up to $100,000). SAIF is administered by the Federal Deposit Insurance Corporation.
6. The Resolution Trust Corporation (RTC) was established to dispose of failed thrift institutions taken over by regulators after January 1, 1989. The RTC will make insured deposits at those institutions available to their customers.

== Other regulations ==
In addition, FIRREA gives both Freddie Mac and Fannie Mae additional responsibility to support mortgages for low- and moderate-income families (12 U.S.C §1441a–2(b). Authorization for State housing finance agencies and nonprofit entities to purchase mortgage-related assets - Investment requirement).

FIRREA replaced the Federal Savings and Loan Insurance Corporation's insurance fund with the Savings Association Insurance Fund, managed by the Federal Deposit Insurance Corporation, and renamed the FDIC's existing fund the Bank Insurance Fund. The FDIC thereby became responsible for deposit insurance for both banks and savings institutions. This section of FIRREA was amended by the Federal Deposit Insurance Reform Act of 2005, which consolidated the two funds.

FIRREA allowed bank holding companies to acquire thrifts. It established new regulations for real estate appraisals. In addition, the Act established Appraisal Subcommittee (ASC) within the Examination Council of the Federal Financial Institutions Examination Council. It also established new capital reserve requirements.

It increased public oversight of the process. It required the agencies to issue Community Reinvestment Act (CRA) ratings publicly and do written performance evaluations using facts and data to support the agencies' conclusions. It also required a four-tiered CRA examination rating system with performance levels of "Outstanding," "Satisfactory," "Needs to Improve," or "Substantial Noncompliance." These rules increased pressure on banks to make mortgage home loans to inner-city and rural areas.

Savings and loans were no longer allowed to acquire "junk bonds" (aka High-yield debt) and were required to dispose of their holdings of these bonds by 1994. They were also required to mark them to the lower of cost or market value.

The amount of "supervisory goodwill" that was allowed to be counted in core capital requirements was phased out through, and then eliminated, by January 1, 1995. (However, the United States Supreme Court in United States v. Winstar Corp. found that the United States had breached its contract with the thrifts by disallowing the "supervisory goodwill" in the core capital calculations.)

== Appraisal standards ==
Title XI of FIRREA created the Appraisal Subcommittee (ASC) of the Federal Financial Institutions Examination Council (FFIEC) to oversee and monitor appraisal standards. It does not regulate appraisers themselves, but does so indirectly such that if the ASC finds that a particular state’s appraiser regulation and certification program is inadequate, then under the banking agencies’ regulations all appraisers in that state are no longer eligible to do appraisals for depository institutions. To accomplish this, the ASC monitors the activities of the state regulatory agencies and the Appraisal Foundation, which promulgates the generally accepted appraisal standards and qualification standards for state-certified and licensed appraisers. Through the Appraisal Standards Board (ASB) and the minimum standards for appraisal licensure through the Appraiser Qualifications Board (AQB), the Appraisal Foundation publishes the Uniform Standards of Professional Appraisal Practice.

== Use with respect to the subprime mortgage crisis ==
The Act, which gives the government broad authority to bring civil claims and has less stringent requirements to establish liability than commercial fraud statutes, was used after the subprime mortgage crisis to attempt to establish the liability of banks that allegedly misrepresented the quality of loans to the Federal Housing Administration, which, relying on the representations of the banks, insured them and subsequently suffered losses.

== See also ==
- Agricultural Credit Act of 1987
