= Home Owners' Loan Corporation =

American government-sponsored corporation

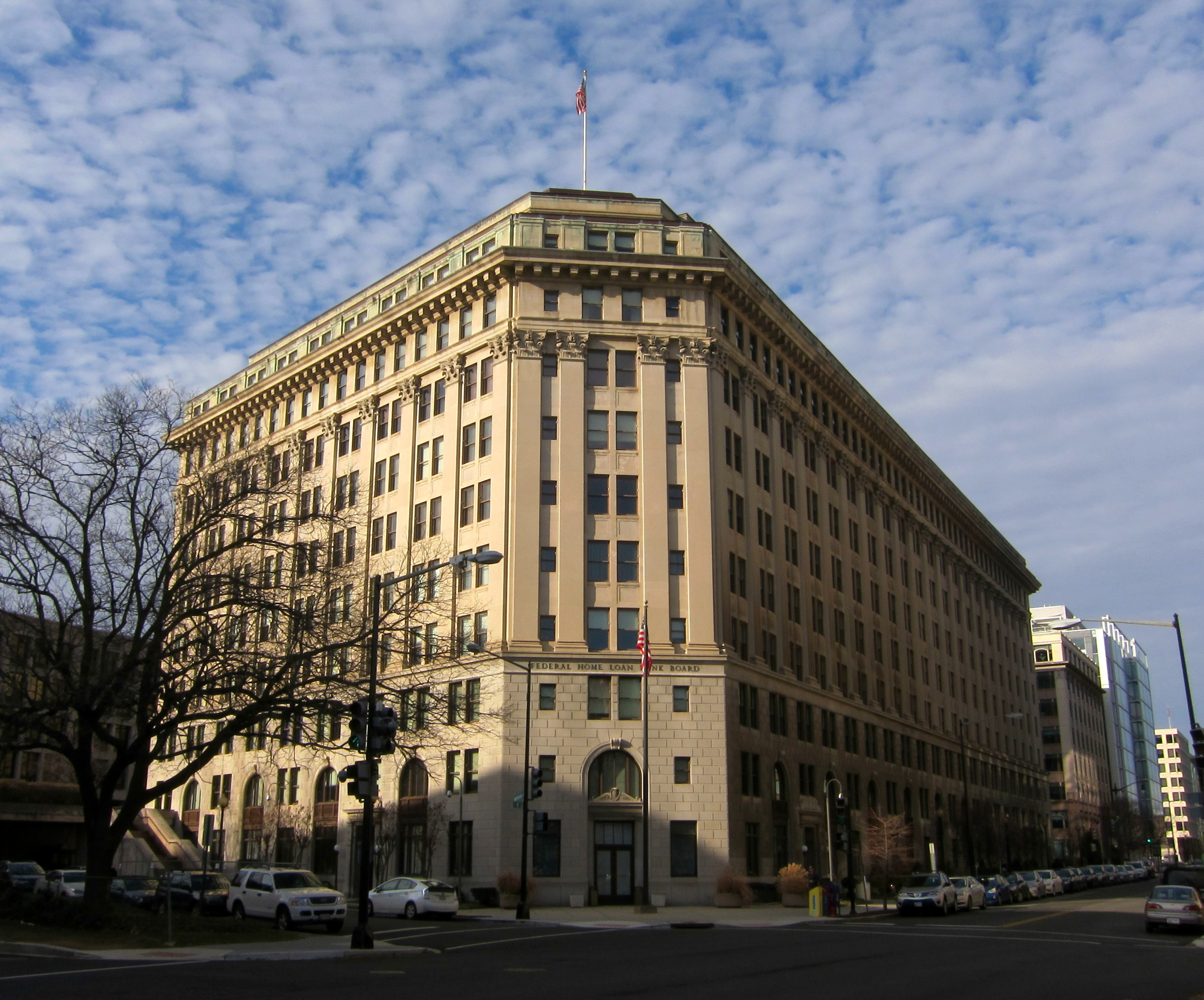
- The former federal headquarters of the Home Owners' Loan Corporation
- Type: Government-sponsored corporation
- Industry: Financial services
- Founded: June 13, 1933
- Defunct: February 4, 1954
- Headquarters: Washington, D.C.
- Services: Credit services
- Number of employees: 20,000 (1935) and declined to less than 500 (1950)

The Home Owners' Loan Corporation (HOLC) was a government-sponsored corporation created as part of the New Deal. The corporation was established in 1933 by the Home Owners' Loan Corporation Act under the leadership of President Franklin D. Roosevelt. Its purpose was to refinance home mortgages currently in default to prevent foreclosure, as well as to expand home buying opportunities.

The HOLC created a housing appraisal system of color-coded maps that categorized the riskiness of lending to households in different neighborhoods. While the maps relied on various housing and economic measures, they also used demographic information (such as the racial, ethnic, and immigrant composition of neighborhoods) to categorize creditworthiness. Since Kenneth T. Jackson's work in the 1980s, a number of studies have found that HOLC was a key promoter of redlining and a driver of racial residential segregation and racial wealth inequality in the United States.

== Organizational history ==
HOLC was established as an emergency agency under Federal Home Loan Bank Board (FHLBB) supervision by the Home Owners' Loan Act of 1933, June 13, 1933. It was transferred with FHLBB and its components to the Federal Loan Agency by Reorganization Plan No. I of 1939, effective July 1, 1939. It was assigned with other components of abolished FHLBB to the Federal Home Loan Bank Administration (FHLBA), National Housing Agency, by EO 9070, February 24, 1942. Its board of directors was abolished by Reorganization Plan No. 3 of 1947, effective July 27, 1947, and H.O.L.C. was assigned, for purposes of liquidation, to the Home Loan Bank Board within the Housing and Home Finance Agency. It was terminated by order of Home Loan Bank Board Secretary, J. Francis Moore, effective February 3, 1954, pursuant to an act of June 30, 1953 (67 Stat. 121).

== Operations ==
The HOLC issued bonds and then used the bonds to purchase mortgage loans from lenders. The loans purchased were for homeowners who were having problems making the payments on their mortgage loans "through no fault of their own". The HOLC refinanced the loans for the borrowers. Many lenders gained from selling the loans because the HOLC bought the loans by offering a value of bonds equal to the amount of principal owed by the borrower, unpaid interest on the loan, and taxes that the lender paid on the property. This value of the loan was the amount of the loan that was refinanced for the borrower. The borrower gained because they were offered a loan with a longer time frame at a lower interest rate. It was rare to reduce the amount of principal owed. The Government gave $200 million to the people and it will help the people to be able to pay off the mortgage and they would not lose their house.

== Loan repayments and foreclosure policies ==
Between 1933 and 1935, the HOLC made slightly more than one million loans. At that point it stopped making new loans and then focused on the repayments of the loans. The typical borrower whose loan was refinanced by the HOLC was more than 2 years behind on payments of the loan and more than 2 years behind on making tax payments on the property. The HOLC eventually foreclosed on 20 percent of the loans that it refinanced. It tended to wait until the borrower had failed to make payments on the loan for more than a year before it foreclosed on the loan. When the HOLC foreclosed, it typically refurbished the home. In many cases it rented out the home until it could be resold. The HOLC tried to avoid selling too many homes quickly to avoid having negative effects on housing prices. Ultimately, more than 800,000 people repaid their HOLC loans, and many repaid them on time. HOLC officially ceased operations in 1951, when its last assets were sold to private lenders. HOLC was only applicable to nonfarm homes, worth less than $20,000. HOLC also assisted mortgage lenders by refinancing problematic loans and increasing the institutions' liquidity. When its last assets were sold in 1951, HOLC turned a small profit.

== Redlining ==
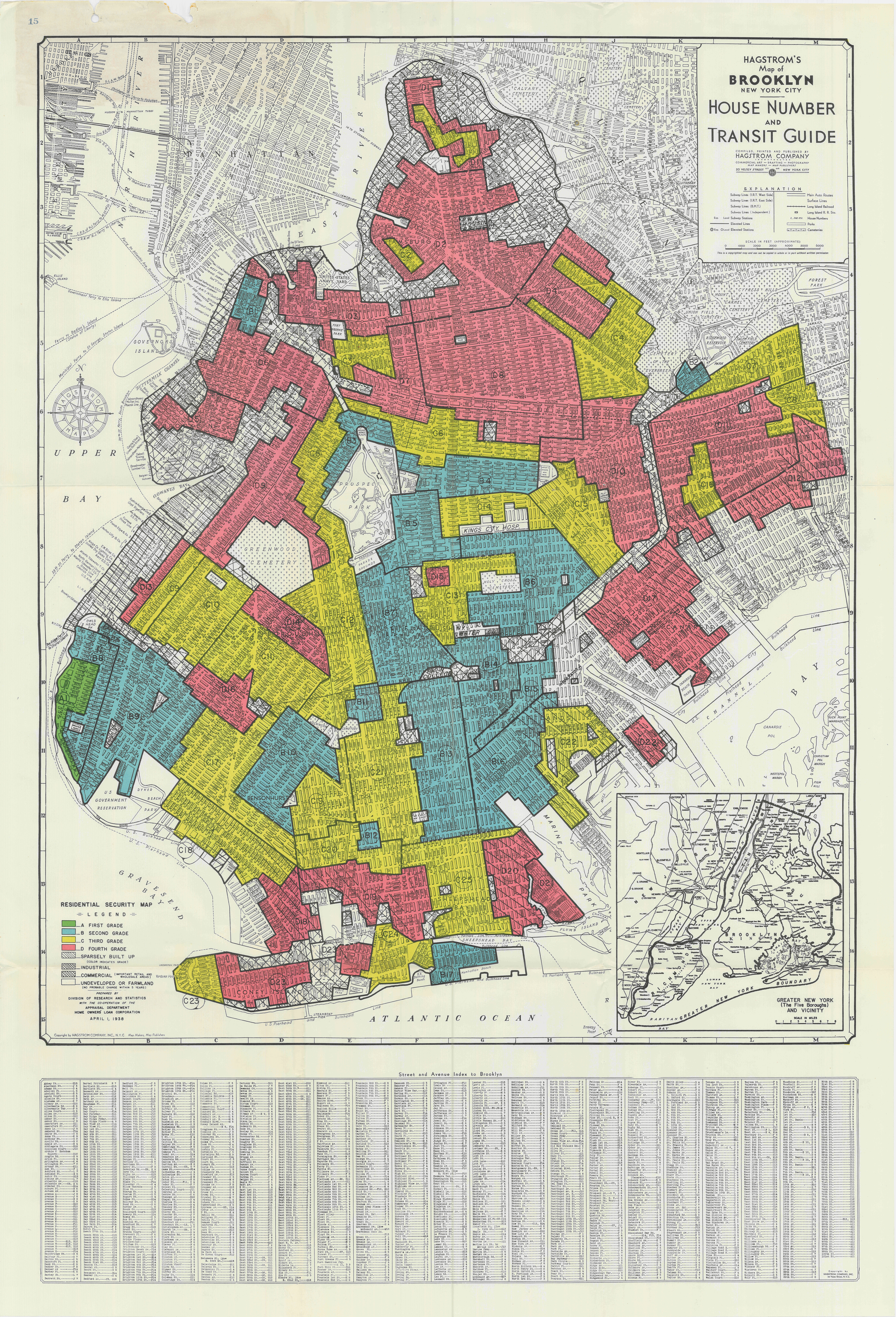
Brooklyn, NY HOLC redlining map

HOLC is often cited as the originator of mortgage redlining. HOLC maps generated during the 1930s to assess credit-worthiness were color-coded by mortgage security risk, with majority African-American areas disproportionately likely to be marked in red indicating designation as "hazardous". These maps were made as part of HOLC's City Survey project that ran from late 1935 until 1940. Perhaps ironically, HOLC had issued refinancing loans to African American homeowners in its initial "rescue" phase before it started making its redlining maps. The racist attitudes and language found in HOLC appraisal sheets and Residential Security Maps created by the HOLC gave federal support to real-estate practices that helped segregate American housing throughout the 20th century.

The effects of redlining, as noted in HOLC maps, endures to the present time. A study released in 2018 found that 74 percent of neighborhoods that HOLC graded as high-risk or "hazardous" are low-to-moderate income neighborhoods today, while 64 percent of the neighborhoods graded "hazardous" are minority neighborhoods today. "It's as if some of these places have been trapped in the past, locking neighborhoods into concentrated poverty," said Jason Richardson, director of research at the NCRC, a consumer advocacy group.

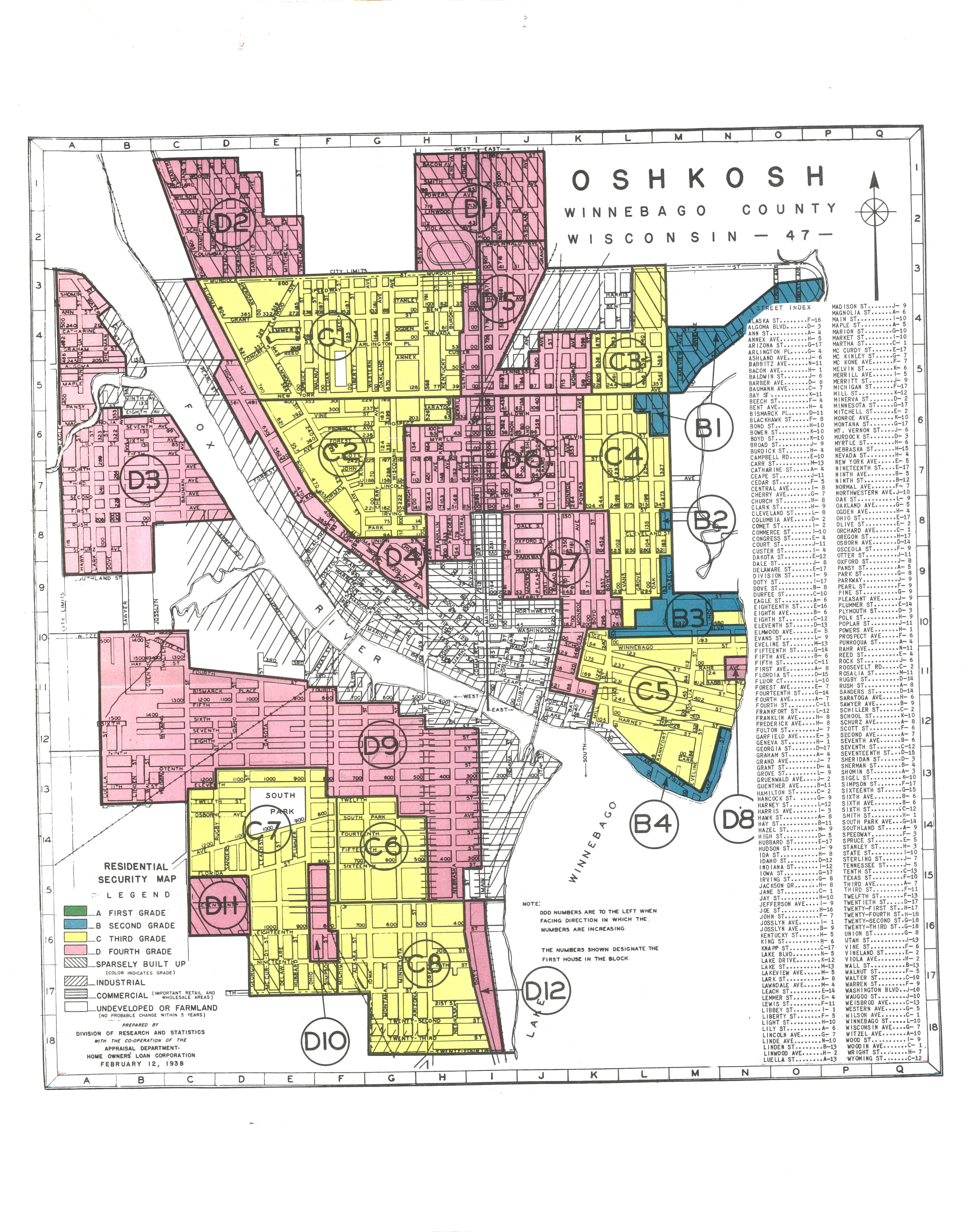
Oshkosh, WI HOLC redlining map

A 2020 study in the American Sociological Review found that HOLC led to substantial and persistent increases in racial residential segregation. A 2021 study in the American Economic Journal found that areas classified as high-risk on HOLC maps became increasingly segregated by race during the next 30–35 years, and suffered long-run declines in home ownership, house values, and credit scores. HOLC's evaluation of neighborhoods in the 1930s correlates with "health, employment, education, and income measures" in these same neighborhoods decades later.

Since the rediscovery of HOLC documents in the 1980s, there has been considerable debate about the exact role of HOLC and its maps in redlining: even as the neighborhood evaluations largely align with race and with ongoing disparities, it is unclear exactly how much of an effect HOLC itself had. According to a paper by economic historian Price V. Fishback and three co-authors, issued in 2021, the blame placed on HOLC is misplaced. Far from "ironically" issuing a few loans to African-Americans in an "initial phase" and then becoming a major promoter of redlining, HOLC actually refinanced mortgage loans for African-Americans in near proportion to the share of African-American homeowners. The pattern of loans had basically no relationship to the "redlining" maps because the program to create the maps did not even begin until after 90% of HOLC refinancing agreements had already been concluded.

However, the HOLC shared their maps with the other major New Deal housing program, the Federal Housing Administration. But, the FHA already had its own discriminatory program of systematically rating urban neighborhoods and the HOLC used the FHA's discriminatory guidelines for its maps.

As for private lenders, though Kenneth T. Jackson's claim that they relied on the HOLC's maps to implement their own discriminatory practices has been widely repeated, the evidence is weak that private lenders had access to the maps. By contrast, it is well documented that private lenders understood which neighborhoods the FHA favored and disfavored; suburban greenfield developers often explicitly advertised the FHA-insurability of their properties in ads for prospective buyers. Redlining was an established practice in the real estate industry before the federal government had any significant role in it; to the extent that any federal agency is to blame for perpetuating the practice, it is the Federal Housing Administration and not the Home Owners' Loan Corporation.

== See also ==
- Federal Home Loan Banks
