= Federal Deposit Insurance Reform Act =

United States law

The Federal Deposit Insurance Reform Act of 2005 (Title II, subtitle B of Pub. L. 109–171 (text) (PDF), 110 Stat. 9, enacted February 8, 2006, with a companion statute, Federal Deposit Insurance Reform Conforming Amendments Act of 2005, Pub. L. 109–173 (text) (PDF), 119 Stat. 3601, enacted February 15, 2006), was an act of the United States Congress on banking regulation. It contained a number of changes to the Federal Deposit Insurance Corporation (FDIC).

- It raised the limit on deposit insurance for retirement accounts from $100,000 to $250,000 and indexed the amount to inflation.
- It merged the two deposit insurance funds that the FDIC had been administering separately since the Financial Institutions Reform, Recovery, and Enforcement Act of 1989 (FIRREA). FIRREA abolished the former Federal Savings and Loan Insurance Corporation (FSLIC) and created a new insurance fund, Savings Association Insurance Fund (SAIF), to be administered by the FDIC. The other, longer-standing fund administered by the FDIC was the Bank Insurance Fund (BIF). SAIF and BIF were combined into the Depositor Insurance Fund (DIF).
- It provided credits to banks that had paid into the deposit insurance funds in the early 1990s, in the aftermath of the savings and loan crisis.
- It imposed a requirement that the FDIC issue rebates to the banking industry if the level of the deposit insurance fund rises above 1.5% of the total insured deposits.
