= Office of Thrift Supervision =

US Treasury Department agency (1989–2011)

Agency overview
- Formed: 9 August 1989
- Preceding agency: Federal Home Loan Bank Board
- Dissolved: 21 July 2011
- Superseding agency: Office of the Comptroller of the Currency (OCC) Federal Deposit Insurance Corporation (FDIC) Federal Reserve Board of Governors Consumer Financial Protection Bureau (CFPB)
- Headquarters: Washington, D.C.
- Employees: 1024 (2007)
- Annual budget: US$250 million (2008)
- Agency executive: John E. Bowman, Acting Director
- Parent agency: Department of the Treasury
- Website: http://www.ots.treas.gov/

The Office of Thrift Supervision (OTS) was a United States federal agency under the Department of the Treasury that chartered, supervised, and regulated all federally chartered and state-chartered savings banks and savings and loans associations. It was created in 1989 as a renamed version of the Federal Home Loan Bank Board, another federal agency (that was faulted for its role in the savings and loan crisis). Like other U.S. federal bank regulators, it was paid by the banks it regulated. The OTS was initially seen as an aggressive regulator, but was later lax. Declining revenues and staff led the OTS to market itself to companies as a lax regulator in order to get revenue.

The OTS also expanded its oversight to companies that were not banks. Some of the companies that failed under OTS supervision during the 2008 financial crisis include American International Group (AIG), Washington Mutual, and IndyMac.

The OTS was implicated in a backdating scandal regarding the balance sheet of IndyMac. Section 312 of the Dodd-Frank Wall Street Reform and Consumer Protection Act dissolved the OTS, transferring its functions to other agencies.

== Funding ==
OTS did not receive a government budget; instead, they were funded by the banks they regulate, like other U.S. federal bank regulators. Other regulatory agencies like the OTS include the Office of the Comptroller of the Currency, the FDIC, the Federal Reserve System, and the National Credit Union Administration.

If banks regulated by OTS fail, revenues for the agency decline; conversely, if the OTS regulates more banks, revenues increase.

== History ==
The OTS was established in 1989 in response to the savings and loan crisis. On television, President George H. W. Bush said,

Never again will America allow any insured institution to operate normally if owners lack sufficient tangible capital to protect depositors and taxpayers alike.

and "trashed" the predecessor Federal Home Loan Bank Board; soon thereafter, the sign was changed to the "Office of Thrift Supervision". Savings and Loan legislation—the Financial Institutions Reform, Recovery and Enforcement Act of 1989—"abolished", or renamed, the independent Federal Home Loan Bank Board to the Office of Thrift Supervision and placed it under Department of the Treasury supervision. On 22 March 1990, in a setback to the George H. W. Bush administration, Federal District Judge Royce C. Lamberth ruled that OTS appointments of the former director and acting director, M. Danny Wall and Salvatore R. Martoche, had been unconstitutional because they were not nominated by the President and confirmed by the Senate.

In 1992, under Director T. Timothy Ryan, the OTS aggressively shut down troubled Savings and Loan (S&L) outfits, and was criticized by the industry and industry lawyers for not allowing some S&Ls that might survive to have a chance. Ryan contrasted the OTS cleanup of the S&L industry to the former situation.

We're the regulator of the industry. We aren't the trade association and we're not its promoter. That's how they got into trouble the last time. They had a regulator who was a promoter.

S&Ls were "dropping like flies" and this presented problems for OTS staff—declining revenues led to a declining staff. The OTS responded by marketing itself at industry meetings. At one such meeting, federal regulators were "announcing a campaign to ease regulation" and they were in a photo-op over a stack of the federal regulations—holding garden shears signaling their intent to cut through them. OTS Director James Gilleran brought a chainsaw. "Companies got the message." In 1998, OTS approved 43 charters, with more than a third going to non-banks. In 2004 Gilleran said "our goal is to allow thrifts to operate with a wide breadth of freedom from regulatory intrusion". The OTS "adopted an aggressively deregulatory stance toward the mortgage lenders it regulated... [and] allowed the reserves the banks held as a buffer against losses to dwindle to a historic low."

In March 2007, a Government Accountability Office report noted that "In contrast [to the Federal Reserve], a substantial minority of the firms OTS oversees—especially the large, complex ones—have primary businesses other than those traditionally engaged in by thrifts, such as insurance, securities, or commercial activities."

Section 312 of the Dodd-Frank Wall Street Reform and Consumer Protection Act transferred OTS functions to the Office of the Comptroller of the Currency (OCC), the Federal Deposit Insurance Corp. (FDIC), the Federal Reserve Board, and the Consumer Financial Protection Bureau (CFPB) as of 21 July 2011. The OTS ceased to exist on 19 October 2011.

The end of the OTS prompted at least one thrift, Thrivent Financial for Lutherans, to convert to a credit union rather than meet the "strict" insurance regulations set forth in the Dodd-Frank Act.

== Reform ==
- In 2008, then Treasury Secretary Henry Paulson proposed merging the OTS with the Office of the Comptroller of the Currency.
- On 17 June 2009 President Barack Obama announced that he would ask the United States Congress to merge OTS into the Office of the Comptroller of the Currency, which regulates federally chartered banks.
- In 2009, both the House and Senate proposals included merging OTS with the Office of the Comptroller of the Currency.
- In 2010, the US Senate passed legislation that would strengthen oversight of large financial institutions, but would continue to allow smaller banks to shop for their own regulator, a loophole sought by the Independent Community Bankers of America and the American Bankers Association.

== Responsibilities ==
OTS supervised holding companies as well as thrift institutions. This resulted in OTS providing consolidated supervision for such well-known firms as General Electric (GE), AIG, Inc., Ameriprise Financial, American Express, Morgan Stanley, and Merrill Lynch. OTS's consolidated supervision program for GE, AIG Inc., and Ameriprise was recognized as "equivalent" by the European Union—allowing these firms to operate their financial businesses in the EU without forming an EU holding company and submitting to supervision in the EU.

The OTS was the primary regulator of Federal Savings Associations (sometimes referred to as Federal thrifts). Federal savings associations include both Federal Savings Banks and Federal Savings and Loans. The OTS was also responsible for supervising Savings and Loan Holding Companies (SLHCs) and some state-chartered institutions.

== Institutions regulated ==
The following are some of the larger institutions that were regulated by the OTS:

- American Express Bank, FSB – Salt Lake City, UT
- American International Group – New York City, NY (Note 4)
- Astoria Federal Savings and Loan Association – Long Island City, NY
- BankUnited, FSB – Coral Gables, FL now (BankUnited)
- Capital One, F.S.B. – McLean, VA (Note 1)
- Chevy Chase Bank, Federal Savings Bank – McLean, VA
- Citicorp Trust Bank, FSB – Wilmington, DE
- Citizens Bank of Pennsylvania – Philadelphia, PA
- Countrywide Bank, FSB - Alexandria, VA (Note 2 - now a part of Bank of America)
- Downey Savings, F.A. – Newport Beach, CA (now a part of US Bank)
- E-Trade Bank – Arlington, VA
- Flagstar Bank, FSB – Troy, MI
- Guaranty Bank – Austin, TX
- H&R Block Bank - Kansas City, MO
- Hudson City Savings Bank, FSB – Paramus, NJ
- IndyMac Bank, FSB – Pasadena, CA (Note 3)
- ING Bank, FSB – Wilmington, DE
- New York Community Bank – Flushing, NY
- Ohio Savings Bank / Amtrust – Cleveland, OH
- PFF Bank & Trust - Rancho Cucamonga, CA (Note 2 - now part of US Bank)
- Sovereign Bank – Wyomissing, PA
- USAA Federal Savings Bank – San Antonio, TX
- Washington Mutual FSB - Seattle, WA (Note 2 - now a part of JPMorgan Chase)
- Wilmington Savings Fund Society, FSB - Wilmington, DE

=== Indymac ===
In March 2008, OTS Director John M. Reich stated that the Savings and Loan industry remained vibrant due to the effectiveness of regulators. Reich blamed Indymac's 11 July 2008 failure on $1.3bn of withdrawals in the fortnight following concerns raised from Senator Chuck Schumer over the bank's solvency. Schumer faulted the OTS. The failure of IndyMac Bank was the fourth largest bank failure in United States history. Prior to IndyMac's failure on 11 July 2008, the bank had come to rely heavily on higher cost, less stable, brokered deposits, as well as secured borrowings, to fund its operations. The bank had focused on stated income and other aggressively underwritten loans in areas with rapidly escalating home prices, particularly in California and Florida.

On 21 July 2008, Mr. Reich described "interference with the regulatory process by reporting and disseminating speculation about the condition of financial institutions, thereby undermining public confidence in those institutions and causing serious harm" as a contributor to the failure of IndyMac as well as Fannie Mae, Freddie Mac and Lehman Brothers.

On 22 December 2008, Mr. Reich removed his agency's western director, Darrel W. Dochow for allowing IndyMac to backdate a capital infusion of $18 million from its parent company so that the bank would appear "well capitalized" in its 10-Q for the period ending 31 March 2008. According to a source with knowledge of the incident, at another point Mr. Dochow limited the scope of a review by OTS regulators of IndyMac's portfolio of loans and other assets, overruling the advice of others in the agency. Mr. Dochow played a central role in the savings-and-loan scandal of the 1980s, overriding a recommendation by federal bank examiners in San Francisco to seize Lincoln Savings, the giant savings and loan owned by Charles Keating. Mr. Reich called the backdating irregularity "a relatively small factor" in the collapse of IndyMac.

On 12 February 2009, Mr. Reich resigned, announcing he would step down 27 February.

On 26 February 2009, the Treasury Department's inspector general released a report citing laxity at the OTS under Reich for adding significantly to the $10.7 billion in FDIC losses from the IndyMac failure, as well as the estimated $270 million in losses suffered by uninsured depositors. The report concluded that, under the law, OTS should have taken Prompt Corrective Action against IndyMac in May 2008. Commenting on the report, Inspector General Eric Thorson dismissed Reich's claim that Senator Schumer's letters caused the failure. Marla Freedman, the assistant inspector general for audit, detailed a pattern of excess risk-taking and abuse of the lending process at IndyMac and the OTS's consistent and concurrent failure to act. Mr. Reich said in a letter to the inspector general that he agreed with the agency's filings.

On 27 February 2009, Mr. Reich stepped down amidst the continuing audit of backdating at IndyMac and four other institutions. Scott Polakoff, OTS senior deputy director and chief operating officer, hired under Mr. Reich, became acting director on his departure.

On 26 March 2009, Polakoff was removed and placed on leave by United States Secretary of the Treasury Timothy Geithner, amidst an announced further review and investigation of the backdating scandal by the U.S. Treasury's Inspector General.

=== AIG ===
The OTS was pressed by the Senate Banking Committee to admit partial blame for the failure of American International Group (AIG). In a congressional hearing, after Donald Kohn described how there was no regulator for AIG Financial Products or the company overall, Scott Polakoff interrupted. Polakoff stated that it was time for the OTS to take some responsibility because they had been "deemed an acceptable regulator for both US domestic and international operations".

Due to OTS regulation of AIG, the Mayfair-based (London, UK) AIG Financial Products division was not subject to Financial Services Authority regulation. OTS regulation allowed France's Commission Bancaire to grant approval for a Paris-based banking subsidiary, Banque AIG. The Mayfair-based AIG Financial Products division then opened under a system which allowed branch openings in member countries after one EU regulator's approval.

That OTS was the primary regulator of AIG has been described as "nonsense" and compared to "the super-heavyweight of the world going up against the 65 lb, 13-year-old, class weakling". AIG operates in 130 countries. The OTS had a small division that monitored derivatives including the credit default swaps at AIG. After a dispute with Goldman Sachs in 2007 over the value of the credit default swaps, the OTS did not initiate formal enforcement action, but "periodically raised concerns with AIG managers". Other sources of concern were the three credit rating agencies and AIG's auditor PricewaterhouseCoopers. In March 2008, after AIG disclosed valuation problems, the OTS sent a letter to AIG requesting a "corrective action plan" in 30 days. The division overseeing AIG Financial Products was "quietly disbanded" and AIG missed their deadline.

== Locations ==
In addition to being headquartered in Washington D.C., OTS had regional offices in Atlanta, Dallas, Jersey City, San Francisco, and Chicago.

== See also ==
- Title 12 of the Code of Federal Regulations
- 2009 United States bank failures
- Bank regulation in the United States

== Notes ==
- (NOTE 1): Now a national bank supervised by the Office of the Comptroller of the Currency
- (NOTE 2): Has failed and subsequently been acquired by a national bank
- (NOTE 3): Has failed and is now under receivership with the Federal Deposit Insurance Corporation
- (NOTE 4): Has effectively been nationalized and is currently run by the United States Department of Treasury
