= Marvin L. Warner =

American diplomat (1919–2002)

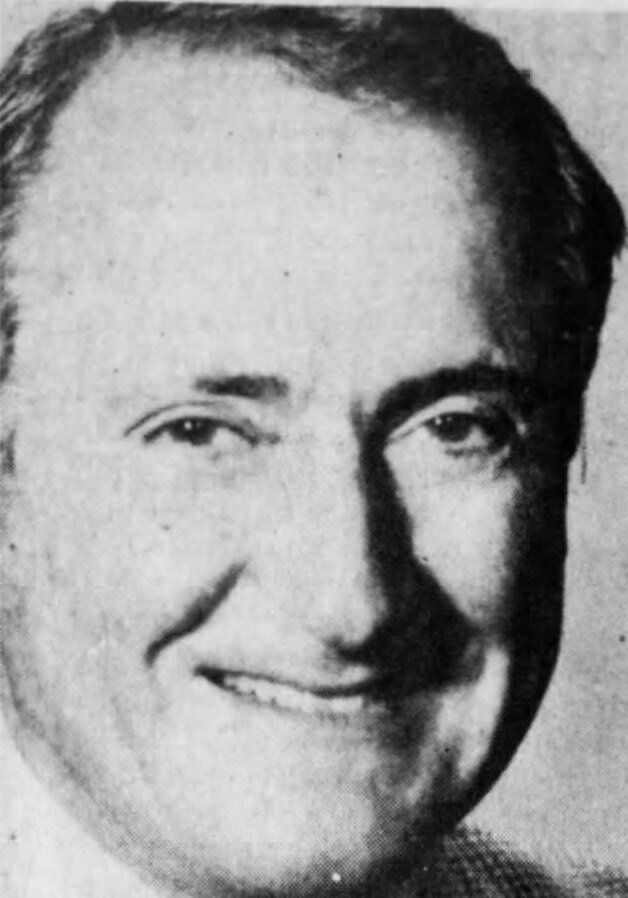
- Warner circa 1981
- Born: June 8, 1919; Birmingham, Alabama, U.S.
- Died: April 8, 2002 (aged 82); Cape Canaveral, Florida, U.S.
- Education: University of Alabama
- Occupation: Banker
- Criminal charges: 9 banking violations
- Criminal penalty: 3.5 years in prison, $22 million fine
- Spouses: Jane Marie Blach (m. 1942; div. 1967) Susan Lee Gherman (m. 1979; div. 1980) Josephine Louise "Jody" Piehowicz (m. 1984, divorced)

United States Ambassador to Switzerland and Liechtenstein
- In office July 11, 1977 – July 10, 1979
- President: Jimmy Carter
- Preceded by: Nathaniel Davis
- Succeeded by: Richard David Vine

Marvin Leon Warner (June 8, 1919 – April 8, 2002) was the United States Ambassador to Switzerland and Liechtenstein from 1977 until 1979 (some sources say until 1981) and the owner of the Birmingham Stallions. He was the owner of Home State Savings Bank, breeder of thoroughbred horses, part owner of the New York Yankees from 1973 until 1975 as well as the Tampa Bay Buccaneers.

The Warner-owned Birmingham Stallions were one of the most successful teams in the USFL's three-year existence. The team compiled a 14–4 record during the 1984 season and came within one win of the USFL Championship game. Hopes were high for the 1985 season.

Matters would take a dark turn for Warner only weeks after the season began. On March 4, 1985, ESM Government Securities, a Florida-based securities dealer was raided and shut down by the Securities and Exchange Commission. ESM specialized in term repurchase agreements and reverse repurchase agreements. The company had incurred large losses and had pledged collateral to more than one lender.

Home State Savings Bank was doing substantial business with ESM. After ESM failed, it was revealed that Home State would suffer a loss of about $150 million from their transactions with ESM. A run on the bank ensued with over $100 million withdrawn in a few days. The bank was closed on March 9, 1985. Bank runs ensued on other institutions insured by the Ohio Deposit Guarantee Fund after it was revealed that the fund had insufficient funds to pay off Home State depositors.

With most of his money tied up in either Home State or the Stallions, Warner was forced to give up control of the Stallions just days after Home State's collapse. The league had required its owners to post a $1.3 million letter of credit for just such an emergency. Unfortunately, the Stallions' letter of credit was backed by Home State, rendering it worthless.

Home State Savings Bank was sold on May 29, 1985, to Hunter Savings Association, a part of American Financial Group, and the bank reopened on June 14, 1985. All but one of the other savings institutions covered by the Ohio Deposit Guarantee Fund either merged or obtained federal deposit insurance.

Warner was convicted in March 1987 of nine counts of fraud-related charges relating to Home State Savings Bank. Warner was “sentenced ... to 3 1/2 years in prison and fined $22 million for helping trigger the biggest banking crisis in Ohio history.” Unable to post the $22 million cash bond ordered by the judge, Warner was immediately taken to jail.

When he was released from prison, he moved to an Ocala, Florida horse farm to protect himself from creditors. Those were state charges. He was found innocent on an 18 count indictment on federal charges of one count of conspiracy, 15 counts of wire fraud and two counts of interstate movement of fraudulently obtained funds for which the maximum combined penalty was 90 years.

== Biography ==
Born and raised in Birmingham, he served in the army in World War Two, leaving with the rank of captain. He earned both an undergraduate degree and law degree from the University of Alabama.

Warner died of a heart attack while in Cape Canaveral to watch the launch of the space shuttle Atlantis.

Warner was married three times. All three marriages ended in divorce.

Warner married Jane Marie Blach (1923–2002) in Memphis, Tennessee, in October 1942. Blach's family owned a department store in Birmingham. Warner and Blach had three children: Marvin Jr., Marlin, and Alyson. They divorced in June 1967. Blach that same year married Dr. Albert Sabin, inventor of the oral polio vaccine.

Warner on May 27, 1979, married Susan Lee Gherman (born 1947), daughter of Dr. E. Mortimer and Irene Gherman of Newport Beach, California. The wedding came twelve days after her divorce from Congressman Barry M. Goldwater, Jr. They filed for divorce the next year. In 2017, she married Bob Wright, the former head of NBC.

His third wife was Josephine Louise "Jody" Piehowicz (born 1956). Piehowicz, who grew up in St. Clairsville, Ohio, was an attorney who worked for Vern Riffe, speaker of the Ohio House of Representatives. They married September 2, 1984.
