= Tafflin v. Levitt =

- Supreme Court of the United States

Argued November 27, 1989 Decided January 22, 1990
- Full case name: Tafflin, et al. v. Levitt, et al.
- Citations: 493 U.S. 455 (more) 110 S. Ct. 792; 107 L. Ed. 2d 887

Case history
- Prior: 865 F.2d 595 (4th Cir. 1989) (affirming federal district court); cert. granted, 490 U.S. 1089 (1989).

Holding
- State courts have concurrent jurisdiction to decide civil claims brought under the Racketeer Influenced and Corrupt Organizations Act.

Court membership
- Chief Justice William Rehnquist Associate Justices William J. Brennan Jr. · Byron White; Thurgood Marshall · Harry Blackmun; John P. Stevens · Sandra Day O'Connor; Antonin Scalia · Anthony Kennedy

Case opinions
- Majority: O'Connor, joined by unanimous
- Concurrence: White
- Concurrence: Scalia, joined by Kennedy

Laws applied
- Racketeer Influenced and Corrupt Organizations Act, 18 U.S.C. §§ 1961–1968

Tafflin v. Levitt, 493 U.S. 455 (1990), was a United States Supreme Court case in which the Court held that state courts have concurrent jurisdiction to decide civil claims brought under the Racketeer Influenced and Corrupt Organizations Act (RICO).

== Background ==
RICO is a United States federal law that provides for extended criminal penalties and a civil cause of action for acts performed as part of an ongoing criminal organization. Following its enactment in 1970, there had been a disagreement in federal and state court decisions as to whether state courts had jurisdiction to decide claims filed under this federal statute.

In 1962 Maryland established a quasi-public non-profit corporation, the Maryland Savings-Share Insurance Corporation (MSSIC), to insure accounts held in state chartered savings and loan associations. In May 1985, rumors of financial instability in two thrifts, Old Court Savings and Loans and Merritt Commercial Savings and Loan, led to depositors questioning whether MSSIC was financially able to guarantee all of the deposits, resulting in a run on all state savings and loan associations. This led to the withdrawal of deposits, the failure of Old Court and the subsequent collapse of MSSIC. The Maryland General Assembly during special sessions in 1985 established the Maryland Deposit Insurance Fund (MDIF) to replace the MSSIC.

Nonresident holders of certificates of deposit issued by Old Court in federal district court sued Jeffrey Levitt, the former president of Old Court, the other officers and directors of Old Court and of the MSSIC, Old Court's law and accounting firms, and MDIF, asserting various state law causes of action and claims under the Securities Exchange Act of 1934 and RICO. The district court determined that the plaintiffs failed to state a claim under the Securities Exchange Act, and, since the state courts had concurrent jurisdiction over the RICO claim, ruled that federal abstention over the case was appropriate for the remaining state and RICO claims. On appeal, the Court of Appeals for the Fourth Circuit affirmed and also held that certificates of deposit were not "securities" under the Securities Exchange Act.

The Supreme Court granted certiorari limited to the legal question of whether state courts have concurrent jurisdiction over RICO claims.

== Opinion of the Court ==
In a unanimous opinion written by Justice O'Connor, the Supreme Court noted that under the dual American system of state and federal sovereignty, state courts have inherent authority to adjudicate claims under federal law subject only to the limits of the Supremacy Clause of the United States Constitution. Thus, state courts are presumed under the Court's Gulf Offshore Co. v. Mobil Oil Corp decision to have concurrent jurisdiction over a claim under federal law unless there is a provision in the statute expressly or implicitly limiting jurisdiction to federal courts. There was nothing in the RICO statute explicitly or implicitly preventing state courts from considering civil RICO claims.

Justice White issued a concurring opinion stating that any concern that the concurrent authority of state courts to decide RICO claims would lead to disruptive constructions of federal criminal statutes was not dispositive since state criminal law is similar to federal criminal law. In addition, any incorrect state decisions could be corrected by the Supreme Court.

Justice Scalia wrote a concurring opinion to address dicta from the Gulf Offshore case that had been included in the Tafflin majority opinion that suggested that implications from legislative history could be used to imply that state courts lacked concurrent jurisdiction over federal claims. His view was that Congress must make an affirmative clear statement in the statutory text to deprive a state court of jurisdiction of claims for that federal statute.

== Impact ==
Although federal courts have exclusive jurisdiction of cases involving violations of the Securities Exchange Act, Tafflin allows plaintiffs to bring a RICO claim in state court and include concurrent claims from a Securities Exchange Act predicate violation, including Section 10(b) securities fraud claims. This overlapping jurisdiction is consistent with the remedial purposes of the Securities Exchange Act. The inclusion of a RICO claim in these securities fraud actions allows a plaintiff to receive punitive and treble damages as well as the recovery of attorney's fees, types of damages which are rarely allowed in pure securities fraud cases.

== See also ==
- List of United States Supreme Court cases, volume 493
- List of United States Supreme Court cases
- Lists of United States Supreme Court cases by volume
- List of United States Supreme Court cases by the Rehnquist Court
- Savings and loan crisis
