= Keating Five =

US Senators accused of corruption in 1989

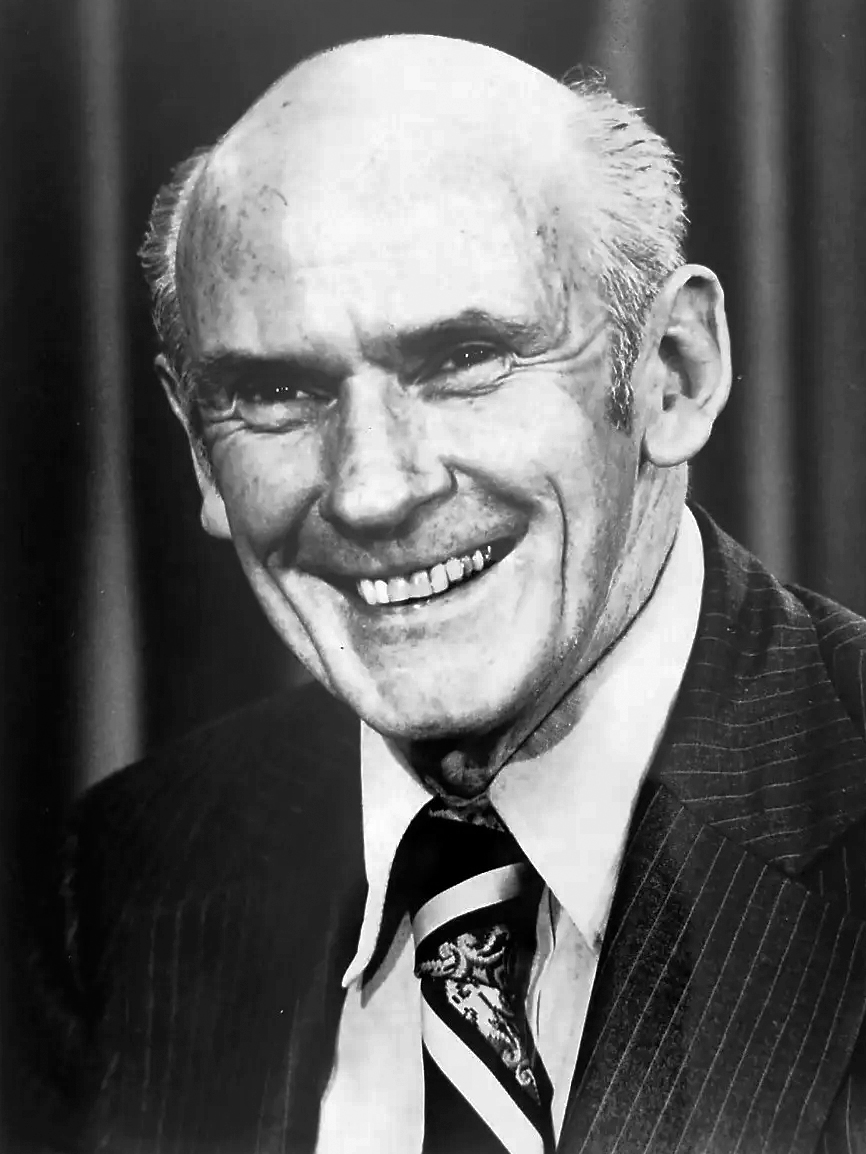
Alan Cranston (D-CA)

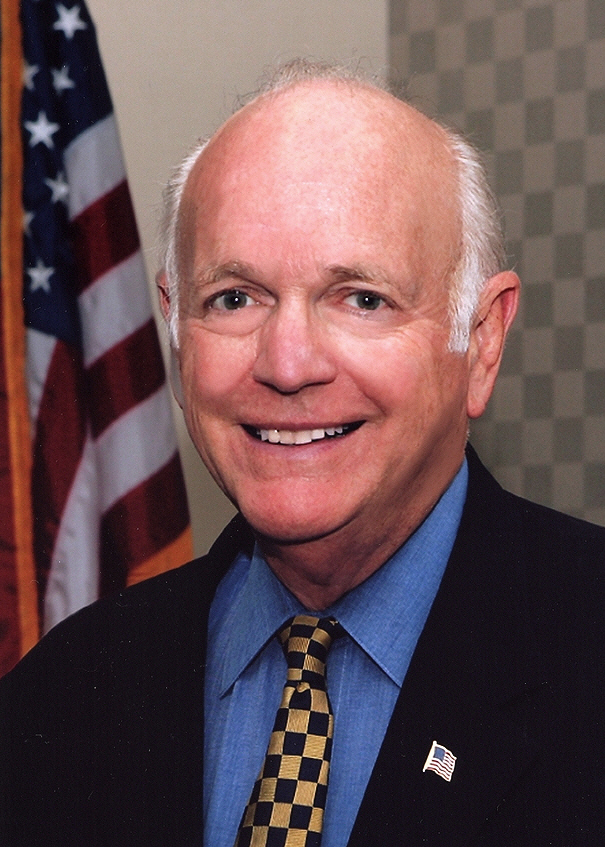
Dennis DeConcini (D-AZ)

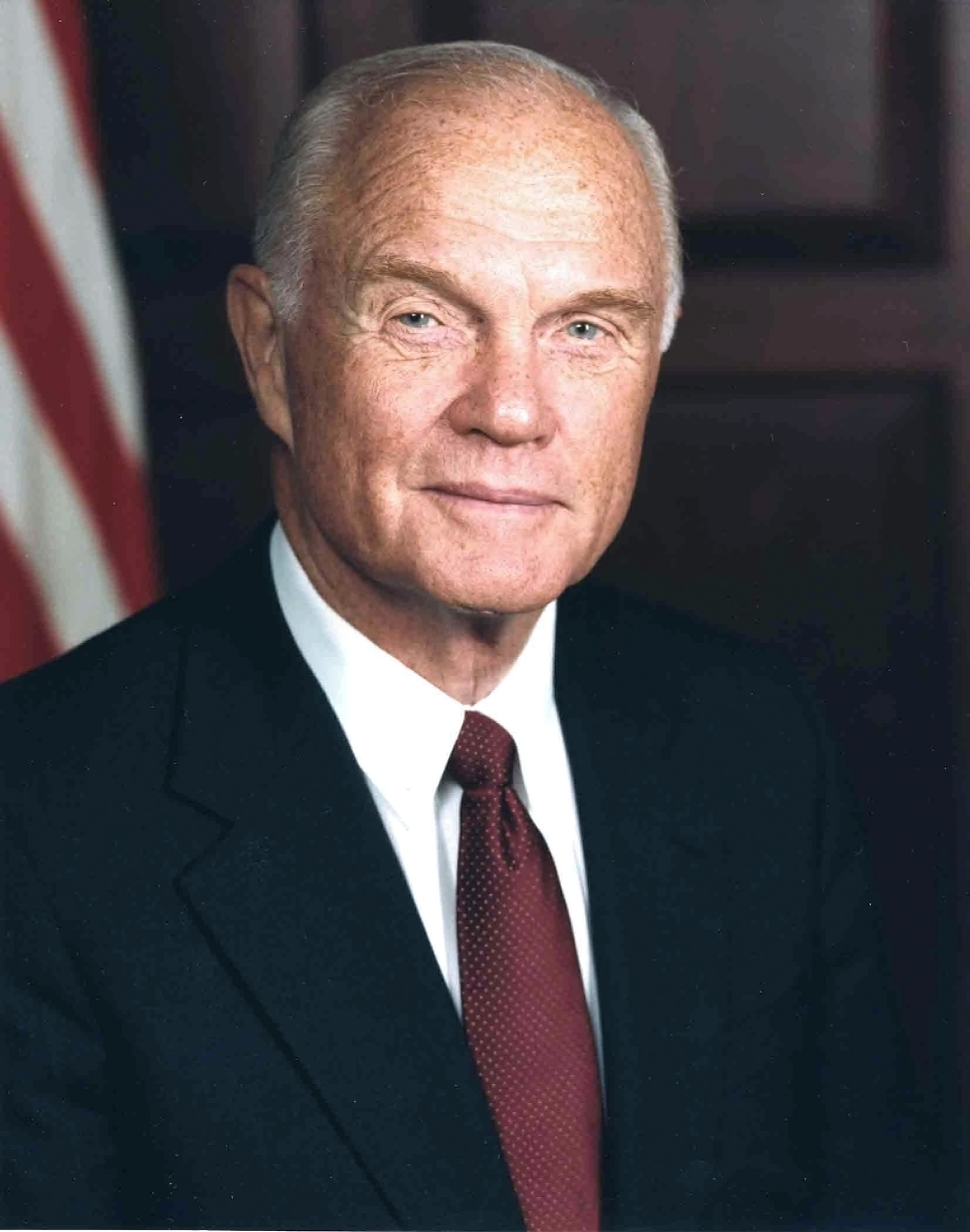
John Glenn (D-OH)

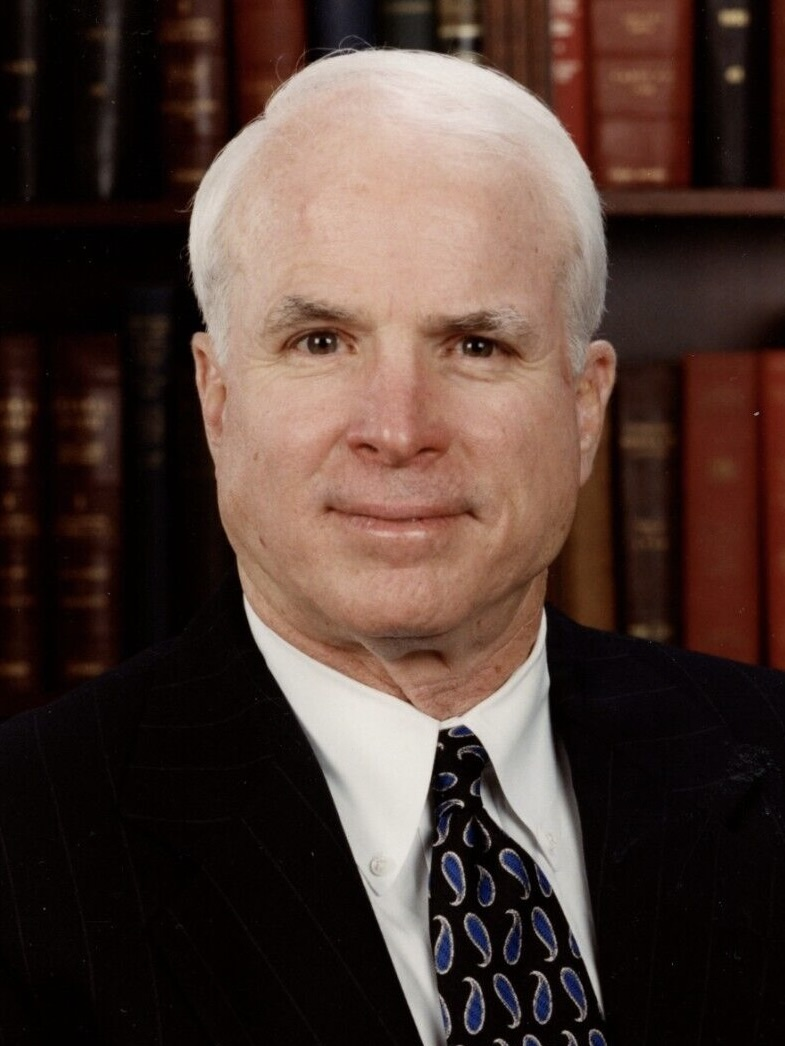
John McCain (R-AZ)

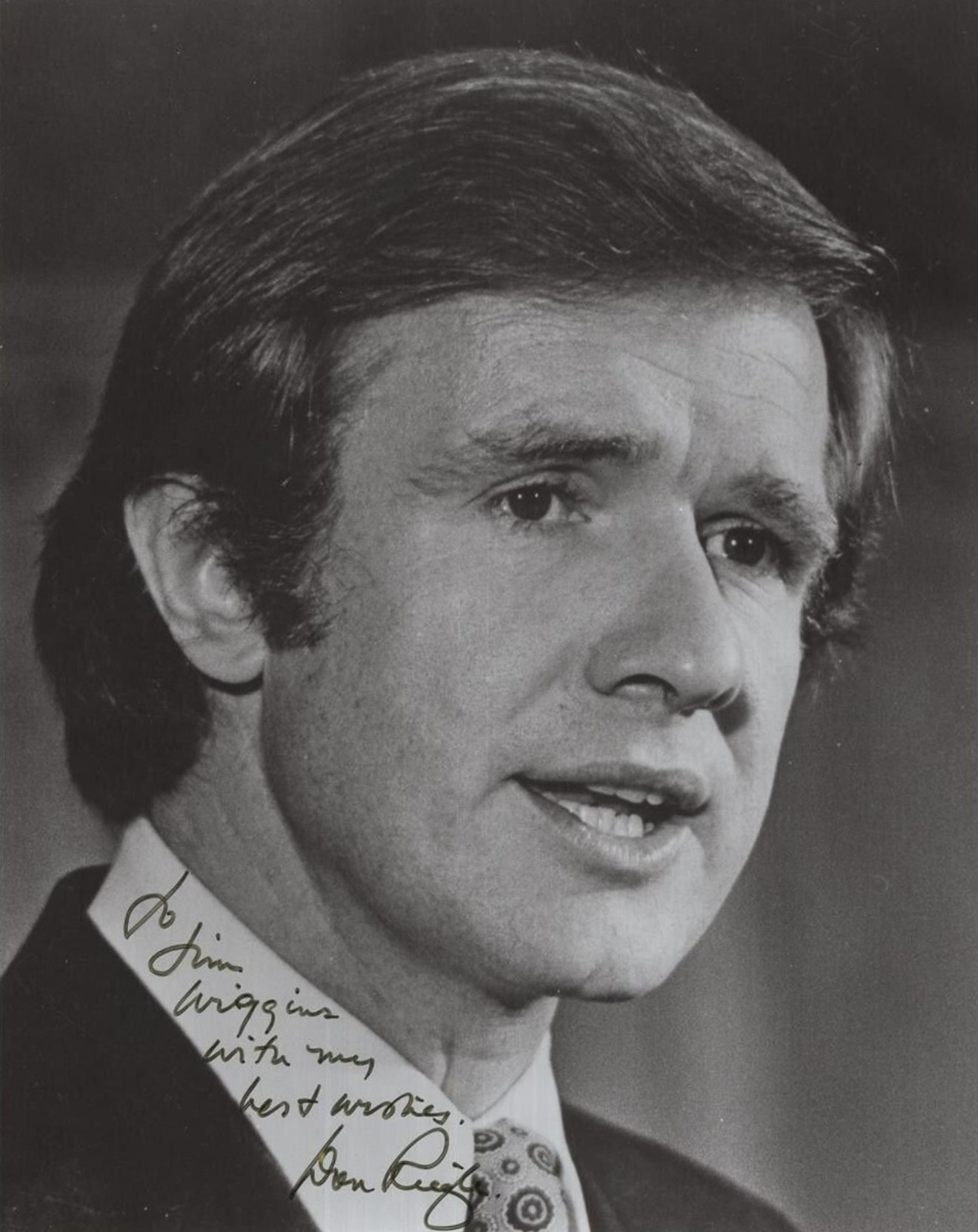
Donald Riegle (D-MI)

The Keating Five were five United States senators accused of corruption in 1989, igniting a major political scandal as part of the larger savings and loan crisis of the late 1980s and early 1990s. The five senators—Alan Cranston (Democrat of California), Dennis DeConcini (Democrat of Arizona), John Glenn (Democrat of Ohio), John McCain (Republican of Arizona), and Donald W. Riegle, Jr. (Democrat of Michigan)—were accused of improperly intervening in 1987 on behalf of Charles H. Keating, Jr., chairman of the Lincoln Savings and Loan Association, which was the target of a regulatory investigation by the Federal Home Loan Bank Board (FHLBB). The FHLBB subsequently backed off taking action against Lincoln.

Lincoln Savings and Loan collapsed in 1989, at a cost of $3.4 billion to the federal government. Some 23,000 Lincoln bondholders were defrauded and many investors lost their life savings. The substantial political contributions Keating had made to each of the senators, totaling $1.3 million, attracted considerable public and media attention. After a lengthy investigation, the Senate Ethics Committee determined in 1991 that Cranston, DeConcini, and Riegle had substantially and improperly interfered with the FHLBB's investigation of Lincoln Savings, with Cranston receiving a formal reprimand. Senators Glenn and McCain were cleared of having acted improperly but were criticized for having exercised "poor judgment".

All five senators served out their terms. Only Glenn and McCain ran for re-election, and they both retained their seats. McCain would go on to run for President of the United States twice, and was the Republican Party nominee in 2008. McCain was the last senator remaining in his office before his death in August 2018.

== Circumstances ==
The U.S. savings and loan crisis of the 1980s and early 1990s was the failure of 747 savings and loan associations in the United States. The ultimate cost of the crisis is estimated to have totaled around $160.1 billion, about $124.6 billion of which was directly paid for by the U.S. federal government. The accompanying slowdown in the finance industry and the real estate market may have been a contributing cause of the 1990-1991 economic recession. Between 1986 and 1991, the number of new homes constructed per year dropped from 1.8 million to 1 million, at the time the lowest rate since World War II.

The Keating Five scandal was prompted by the activities of one particular savings and loan, Lincoln Savings and Loan Association of Irvine, California. Lincoln's chairman was Charles Keating, who ultimately served five years in prison for his corrupt mismanagement of Lincoln. In the four years after Keating's American Continental Corporation (ACC) had purchased Lincoln in 1984, Lincoln's assets had increased from $1.1 billion to $5.5 billion.

Such savings and loan associations had been deregulated in the early 1980s, allowing them to make highly risky investments with their depositors' money. Keating and other savings and loan operators took advantage of this deregulation. Savings and loans established connections to many members of Congress, by supplying them with needed funds for campaigns through legal donations. Lincoln's particular investments took the form of buying land, taking equity positions in real estate development projects, and buying high-yield junk bonds.

== Corruption allegations ==
The core allegation of the Keating Five affair is that Keating had made contributions of about $1.3 million to various U.S. Senators, and he called on those senators to help him resist U.S. federal regulators. The regulators did back off, to later disastrous consequences.

Beginning in 1985, Edwin J. Gray, chair of the Federal Home Loan Bank Board (FHLBB), feared that the savings industry's risky investment practices were exposing the government's insurance funds to huge losses. Gray instituted a rule whereby savings associations could hold no more than ten percent of their assets in "direct investments", and were thus prohibited from taking ownership positions in certain financial entities and instruments. Lincoln had become burdened with bad debt resulting from its past aggressiveness, and by early 1986, its investment practices were being investigated and audited by the FHLBB: in particular, whether it had violated these direct investment rules; Lincoln had directed Federal Deposit Insurance Corporation-insured accounts into commercial real estate ventures. By the end of 1986, the FHLBB had found that Lincoln had $135 million in unreported losses and had surpassed the regulated direct investments limit by $600 million.

Keating had earlier taken several measures to oppose Gray and the FHLBB, including recruiting a study from then-private economist Alan Greenspan saying that direct investments were not harmful, and getting President Ronald Reagan to make a recess appointment of a Keating ally, Atlanta real estate developer Lee H. Henkel Jr., to an open seat on the FHLBB. By March 1987, however, Henkel had resigned, upon news of his having large loans due to Lincoln. Meanwhile, the Senate had changed control from Republican to Democratic during the 1986 Congressional elections, placing several Democratic senators in key positions, and starting in January 1987, Keating's staff was putting pressure on Cranston to remove Gray from any FHLBB discussion regarding Lincoln. The following month, Keating began large-scale contributions into Cranston's project to increase California voter registration. In February 1987, Keating met with Riegle and began contributing to Riegle's 1988 re-election campaign.

It appeared as though the government might seize Lincoln for being insolvent. The investigation was, however, taking a long time. Keating was asking that Lincoln be given a lenient judgment by the FHLBB, so that it could limit its high risk investments and get into the safe (at the time) home mortgage business, thus allowing the business to survive. A letter from audit firm Arthur Young & Co. bolstered Keating's case that the government investigation was taking a long time. Keating now wanted the five senators to intervene with the FHLBB on his behalf.

By March 1987, Riegle was telling Gray that "Some senators out west are very concerned about the way the bank board is regulating Lincoln Savings," adding, "I think you need to meet with the senators. You'll be getting a call." Keating and DeConcini were asking McCain to travel to San Francisco to meet with regulators regarding Lincoln Savings; McCain refused. DeConcini told Keating that McCain was nervous about interfering. Keating called McCain a "wimp" behind his back, and on March 24, Keating and McCain had a heated, contentious meeting.

On April 2, 1987, a meeting with Gray was held in DeConcini's Capitol office, with Senators Cranston, Glenn, and McCain also in attendance. The senators requested that no staff be present. DeConcini started the meeting with a mention of "our friend at Lincoln". Gray told the assembled senators that he did not know the particular details of the status of Lincoln Savings and Loan, and that the senators would have to go to the bank regulators in San Francisco that had oversight jurisdiction for the bank. Gray did offer to set up a meeting between those regulators and the senators.

On April 9, 1987, a two-hour meeting with three members of the FHLBB San Francisco branch was held, again in DeConcini's office, to discuss the government's investigation of Lincoln. Present were Cranston, DeConcini, Glenn, McCain, and additionally Riegle. The regulators felt that the meeting was very unusual and that they were being pressured by a united front, as the senators presented their reasons for having the meeting. DeConcini began the meeting by saying, "We wanted to meet with you because we have determined that potential actions of yours could injure a constituent." McCain said, "One of our jobs as elected officials is to help constituents in a proper fashion. ACC [American Continental Corporation] is a big employer and important to the local economy. I wouldn't want any special favors for them.... I don't want any part of our conversation to be improper." Glenn said, "To be blunt, you should charge them or get off their backs," while DeConcini said, "What's wrong with this if they're willing to clean up their act? ... It's very unusual for us to have a company that could be put out of business by its regulators." The regulators then revealed that Lincoln was under criminal investigation on a variety of serious charges, at which point McCain severed all relations with Keating.

The San Francisco regulators finished their report in May 1987 and recommended that Lincoln be seized by the government due to unsound lending practices. Gray, whose time as chair was about to expire, deferred action on the report, saying that his adversarial relationship with Keating would make any action he took seem vindictive, and that instead the incoming chair should take over the decision. Meanwhile, Keating filed a lawsuit against the FHLBB, saying it had leaked confidential information about Lincoln. The new FHLBB chair was M. Danny Wall, who was more sympathetic to Keating and took no action on the report, saying its evidence was insufficient. In September 1987, the Lincoln investigation was removed from the San Francisco group and in May 1988, the FHLBB signed an agreement with Lincoln that included not going ahead with a criminal referral to the Department of Justice. In July 1988, a new audit of both Lincoln and American Continental began in Washington.

Cranston continued intervening on behalf of Keating after the April 1987 meetings, contacting both Wall and California state regulators and continuing to receive large amounts of new donations to the voter registration projects from Keating. DeConcini also continued on behalf of Keating, contacting Wall, California State regulators, and the Federal Deposit Insurance Corporation (FDIC) advocating approval of a sale of Lincoln as a December 1988 alternative to government seizure. Bank regulators refused to approve the sale of Lincoln. Glenn too continued to help Keating after the April 1987 revelation, by setting up a meeting with then-House Majority Leader Jim Wright.

News of the April meetings between the senators and the FHLBB officials first appeared in National Thrift News in September 1987, but was only sporadically covered by the general media for the next year and a half. In early 1988, The Detroit News ran a story on Riegle's participation, which Riegle responded to on Meet the Press by denying an interceding on Lincoln's behalf, before returning Keating's campaign contributions back to him. In spring 1988, the Los Angeles Times ran a short piece in their business section, but their political reporters did not follow up on it; two isolated, inside page mentions by The Washington Post and The Wall Street Journal similarly failed to develop further. As media critic Howard Kurtz would later write, "the saga of Charles Keating took years to penetrate the national consciousness." The political fortunes of the senators involved did not suffer at this time. During the 1988 U.S. presidential election, McCain was mentioned by the press as a vice-presidential running mate for Republican nominee George H. W. Bush, while Glenn was one of the two vice-presidential finalists in Michael Dukakis' selection process, losing out to Lloyd Bentsen.

== Failure of Lincoln Savings and Loan ==
Lincoln stayed in business; from mid-1987 to April 1989, its assets grew from $3.91 billion to $5.46 billion. During this time, the parent American Continental Corporation was desperate for cash inflow to make up for losses in real estate purchases and projects. Lincoln's branch managers and tellers convinced customers to replace their federally-insured certificates of deposit with higher-yielding bond certificates of American Continental; the customers later said they were never properly informed that the bonds were uninsured and very risky given the state of American Continental's finances. Indeed, the regulators had already adjudged the bonds to have no solvent backing. FDIC chair L. William Seidman would later write that Lincoln's push to get depositors to switch was "one of the most heartless and cruel frauds in modern memory."

American Continental went bankrupt in April 1989, and Lincoln was seized by the FHLBB on April 14, 1989. About 23,000 customers were left with worthless bonds. Many investors, often living in California retirement communities, lost their life savings, and felt emotional damage for having been duped on top of their financial devastation. The total bondholder loss came to between $250 million and $288 million. The federal government was eventually liable for $3.4 billion to cover Lincoln's losses when it seized the institution.

Keating was hit with a $1.1 billion fraud and racketeering action, filed against him by the regulators. In talking to reporters in April, Keating said, "One question, among many raised in recent weeks, had to do with whether my financial support in any way influenced several political figures to take up my cause. I want to say in the most forceful way I can: I certainly hope so."

In the wake of the Lincoln failure, former FHLBB chair Gray went public about all five of the senators' assistance to Keating in a May 21, 1989, front-page story by John Dougherty in the Dayton Daily News, saying that in the April 1987 meetings the senators had sought "to directly subvert the regulatory process" to benefit Keating. Press attention to the senators began to pick up, with a July 1989 Los Angeles Times article about Cranston's role. Within a couple of months, Arizona Republic and Washington Post reporters were investigating McCain's personal relationships with Keating.

== Relationships of senators to Keating ==
On September 25, 1989, several Republicans from Ohio filed an ethics complaint against Glenn, charging that he had improperly intervened on Keating's behalf. The initial charges against the five senators were made on October 13, 1989, by Common Cause, a public interest group, who asked for the U.S. Justice Department and the Senate Ethics Committee to investigate the actions of the senators relative to Lincoln and the contributions received from Keating and whether they violated the rules of the Senate or federal election laws. But the most public attention came from the House Banking Committee, whose new chair Henry B. Gonzalez held 50 hours of hearings into the Lincoln failure and associated events.

By November 1989, the estimated cost of the overall savings and loan crisis had reached $500 billion, and the media's formerly erratic coverage had turned around and become a feeding frenzy. The Lincoln matter was getting large-scale press attention and the senators became commonly known as the "Keating Five". All the senators denied they had done anything improper in the matter, and said Keating's contributions made no difference to their actions. The senators' initial defense of their actions rested on Keating being one of their constituents; McCain said, "I have done this kind of thing many, many times," and said the Lincoln case was like "helping the little lady who didn't get her Social Security." Some of the five hired high-power Washington lawyers to represent them – including Charles Ruff for Glenn and John Dowd for McCain – while others feared that to do so would give the appearance their political careers were in jeopardy.

The Justice Department and the FBI began by investigating possible criminal actions by Keating, but then expanded their inquiries to include the five senators. The FBI soon focused their attention on Cranston, because the largest sums of money from Keating came into Cranston-involved voter-registration drives whose tax-exempt status might have been violated.

Much of the press attention to the Keating Five focused on the exact relationships of each of the senators to Keating.

Cranston had received $39,000 from Keating and his associates for his 1986 Senate re-election campaign. Furthermore, Keating had donated some $850,000 to assorted groups founded by Cranston or controlled by him, and another $85,000 to the California Democratic Party. Cranston considered Keating a constituent because Lincoln was based in California.

DeConcini had received about $48,000 from Keating and his associates for his 1988 Senate re-election campaign. In September 1989, after the government sued Keating and American Continental for improper actions regarding contributions, DeConcini returned the money. DeConcini considered Keating a constituent because Keating lived in Arizona; they were also long-time friends.

Glenn had received $34,000 in direct contributions from Keating and his associates for his 1984 presidential nomination campaign, and a political action committee tied to Glenn had received an additional $200,000. Glenn considered Keating a constituent because one of Keating's other business concerns was headquartered in Ohio.

McCain and Keating had become personal friends following their initial contacts in 1981, and McCain was the only one of the five with close social and personal ties to Keating. Like DeConcini, McCain considered Keating a constituent since Keating lived in Arizona. Between 1982 and 1987, McCain had received $112,000 in political contributions from Keating and his associates. In addition, McCain's wife Cindy McCain and her father Jim Hensley had invested $359,100 in the Fountain Square Project, a Keating shopping center, in April 1986, a year before McCain met with the regulators. McCain, his family, and their baby-sitter had made nine trips at Keating's expense, sometimes aboard Keating's jet; three of the trips were made during vacations to Keating's Bahamas retreat at Cat Cay. McCain did not pay Keating (in the amount of $13,433) for some of the trips until years after they were taken, when he learned that Keating was in trouble over Lincoln.

Riegle had received some $76,000 from Keating and his associates for his 1988 Senate re-election campaign. Riegle would announce in April 1988 that he was returning the money. Riegle's constituency connection to Keating was that Keating's Hotel Pontchartrain was located in Michigan.

== Senate Ethics Committee investigation and findings ==
=== History ===
The Senate Ethics Committee's investigation began on November 17, 1989. It focused on all five senators and lasted 22 months, with nine months of active investigation and seven weeks of hearings. The committee was composed of three Democratic senators, Howell Heflin (chair), David Pryor, and Terry Sanford, and three Republican senators, Warren Rudman (vice chair), Trent Lott, and Jesse Helms. Washington attorney Robert S. Bennett was appointed as special outside counsel to the committee, tasked with conducting the investigation.

Initially the committee investigated in private. On September 10, 1990, Bennett submitted a confidential report, which soon leaked, that recommended that the committee continue its investigation of Cranston, DeConcini, and Riegle, but take no action against Glenn and McCain, as there was insufficient evidence to pursue the latter two. Bennett also recommended that public hearings be held.

Speculation that this would be the decision had already taken place, and both Glenn and McCain were frustrated that the long delay in resolving their cases was damaging their reputations. However, there were political implications, as the removal of the two would eliminate the only Republican from the case. The committee's work was further made difficult by there being no specific rule that governed the propriety of members intervening with federal regulators. By mid-October, several Republican senators, including former Ethics Committee chair Ted Stevens, were taking the unusual step of publicly complaining about the Ethics Committee's inaction, saying that it was unfair to Glenn and McCain, that the whole lengthy process was unfair to all five, and that political motives might be behind the delays. Eventually, the committee could not agree on the Bennett recommendation regarding Glenn and McCain: vice chair Rudman agreed with Bennett, chair Heflin did not. On October 23, 1990, the committee decided to keep all five senators in the case, and scheduled public hearings to question them and other witnesses.

These hearings would take place from November 15 through January 16, 1991. They were held in the Hart Senate Office Building's largest hearing room. They were broadcast live in their entirety by C-SPAN, with CNN and the network news programs showing segments of the testimonies. At the opening of the hearings, as The Washington Post would later write, "the senators sat dourly alongside one another in a long row, a visual suggestive of co-defendants in a rogues' docket." Overall, McCain would later write, "The hearings were a public humiliation."

The committee reported on the other four senators in February 1991, but delayed its final report on Cranston until November 1991. During that period there was partisan-aligned disagreement within the committee over how to treat Cranston, and in August 1991 a special counsel's report was released by Helms. A delay was also caused when Pryor suffered a heart attack in April 1991, and was replaced on the committee by Jeff Bingaman. Bingaman spent months learning the complex materials involved in the matter, only to resign in July due to a conflict of interest. Pryor was reassigned to the committee in August 1991, so as to not further delay its deliberations.

The various committee reports addressed each of the five senators.

=== Cranston: reprimanded ===
The Senate Ethics Committee ruled that Cranston had acted improperly by interfering with the investigation by the FHLBB. He had received more than a million dollars from Keating, including $850,000 to the voter registration groups closely affiliated with him; he had done more arm-twisting than the other senators on Keating's behalf; and he was the only senator officially rebuked by the Senate in this matter.

Cranston was given the harshest penalty of all five senators. In November 1991, the Senate Ethics Committee voted unanimously to reprimand Cranston, instead of the more severe measure that was under consideration: censure by the full Senate. Extenuating circumstances that helped to save Cranston from censure included the fact that he was suffering from cancer, and that he had decided to not seek reelection, according to Heflin. The Ethics Committee took the unusual step of delivering its reprimand to Cranston during a formal session of the full Senate, with almost all 100 Senators present.

Cranston was not accused of breaking any specific laws or rules, but of violating standards that Heflin said "do not permit official actions to be linked with fund-raising." Although the Ethics Committee stated "No evidence was presented to the Committee that Senator Cranston ever agreed to help Mr. Keating in return for a contribution," the Committee officially found that Cranston's conduct had been "improper and repugnant", deserving of "the fullest, strongest and most severe sanction which the committee has the authority to impose." The sanction was in these words: "the Senate Select Committee on Ethics, on behalf of and in the name of the United States Senate, does hereby strongly and severely reprimand Sen. Alan Cranston."

After the Senate reprimanded Cranston, he took to the Senate floor to deny key charges against him. In response, Rudman charged that Cranston's response to the reprimand was "arrogant, unrepentant, and a smear on this institution," and that Cranston was wrong to imply that everyone does what Cranston had done. Alan Dershowitz, serving as Cranston's attorney, alleged that other senators had merely been better at "covering their tracks."

=== Riegle and DeConcini: criticized for acting improperly ===
The Senate Ethics Committee ruled that Riegle and DeConcini had acted improperly by interfering with the investigation by the FHLBB. Specifically, it said that even though neither of them violated any Senate rule, their conduct "gave the appearance of being improper." DeConcini was especially faulted for having taken the lead in the two meetings with the FHLBB.

After the ruling, Riegle expressed contrition, saying "I certainly regret and accept responsibility [for actions that] did lend themselves to an appearance of a conflict of interest." DeConcini, however, said he would continue to be "aggressive" in representing his constituents in their affairs with federal regulators.

=== Glenn and McCain: cleared of impropriety but criticized for poor judgment ===
The Senate Ethics Committee ruled that the involvement of Glenn in the scheme was minimal, and the charges against him were dropped. He was only criticized by the committee for "poor judgment."

The Ethics Committee ruled that the involvement of McCain in the scheme was also minimal, and he too was cleared of all charges against him. McCain was criticized by the committee for exercising "poor judgment" when he met with the federal regulators on Keating's behalf. The report also said that McCain's "actions were not improper nor attended with gross negligence and did not reach the level of requiring institutional action against him....Senator McCain has violated no law of the United States or specific Rule of the United States Senate." On his Keating Five experience, McCain has said: "The appearance of it was wrong. It's a wrong appearance when a group of senators appear in a meeting with a group of regulators, because it conveys the impression of undue and improper influence. And it was the wrong thing to do."

Regardless of the level of their involvement, both senators were greatly affected by it. McCain would write in 2002 that attending the two April 1987 meetings was "the worst mistake of my life". Glenn later described the Senate Ethics Committee investigation as the low point of his life.

The Senate Ethics Committee did not pursue, for lack of jurisdiction, any possible ethics breaches in McCain's delayed reimbursements to Keating for trips at the latter's expense, because they occurred while McCain was in the House. The House Committee on Standards of Official Conduct said that it too lacked jurisdiction, because McCain was no longer in the House. It said it did not require that McCain amend his existing financial disclosure forms for his House years, on the grounds that McCain had now fully reimbursed Keating's company.

=== Reactions ===
Not everyone was satisfied with the Senate Ethics Committee conclusions. Fred Wertheimer, president of Common Cause, which had initially demanded the investigation, thought the treatment of the senators far too lenient, and said, "[The] action by the Senate Ethics Committee is a cop-out and a damning indictment of the committee," and "The U.S. Senate remains on the auction block to the Charles Keatings of the world." Joan Claybrook, president of Public Citizen, called it a "whitewash". Jonathan Alter of Newsweek said it was a classic case of the government trying to investigate itself, labeling the Senate Ethics Committee "shameless" for having "let four of the infamous Keating Five off with a wrist tap." The New York Times ran several editorials criticizing the Ethics Committee for having let the senators off lightly. Margaret Carlson of Time suspected the committee had timed its first report to coincide with the run-up to the Gulf War, minimizing its news impact. One of the San Francisco bank regulators felt that McCain had gotten off too lightly, saying that Keating's business involvement with Cindy McCain was an obvious conflict of interest.

Some of the Senate Ethics Committee members were concerned that letting the senators off lightly would harm their own reputations. Nevertheless, the existing Senate rules did not specifically proscribe the actions taken by DeConcini, Riegle, Glenn, and McCain. Vice-chair Rudman defended the committee's actions, saying: "Given the news media frenzy surrounding [the Keating Five], the easiest thing for the committee to do would have been to find them guilty of something and recommend sanctions. ... The politically difficult thing, the one requiring backbone, was what we did — to review all the evidence and reach a predictably unpopular conclusion based only on fact."

=== Leaks ===
A number of press reports came out during the Ethics Committee's work that purported to reveal aspects of the investigations. Chair Heflin was upset by the leaks and two investigations into them were held, one by the General Accounting Office acting on behalf of the committee and one by the Senate's Temporary Special Independent Counsel. Neither report reached a conclusive finding or directly implicated anyone in the leaks. The special counsel report, released in 1992, ascribed partisanship as the motive for the leaks and said they were intended to hurt DeConcini, Riegle, and Cranston; it also gave an inference that McCain and his staff were responsible for key leaks.

DeConcini later charged that McCain had leaked to the press sensitive information about the investigation that came from some of the closed proceedings of the Ethics Committee. McCain denied doing so under oath, although several press reports concluded that McCain had been one of the main leakers during that time. The GAO investigator later said, "There is absolutely no doubt in my mind that McCain made those leaks." Vice chair Rudman stated in his 1996 autobiography that McCain and his staff were responsible for some of the leaks, but later repudiated the assertion.

== Aftermath ==
Keating and Lincoln Savings became convenient symbols for arguments about what had gone wrong in America's financial system and society, and were featured in popular culture references. The senators did not escape infamy either. By spring 1992, a deck of playing cards was being marketed, called "The Savings and Loan Scandal", that featured on their face Charles Keating holding up his hand, with images of the five senators portrayed as puppets on his fingers. Polls showed that most Americans believed the actions of the Keating Five were typical of Congress as a whole. Political historian Lewis Gould would later echo this sentiment, as well as Cranston attorney Dershowitz's argument, writing that, "the real problem for the 'Keating Three' who were most involved was that they had been caught."

McCain testified against Keating in a civil suit brought by Lincoln bondholders, and was seen as the plaintiffs' best witness. The other four senators refused to testify. Cranston left office in January 1993, and died in December 2000. DeConcini and Riegle continued to serve in the Senate until their terms expired, but they did not seek re-election in 1994. DeConcini was appointed by President Bill Clinton in February 1995 to the board of directors of the Federal Home Loan Mortgage Corporation. Glenn did choose to run for re-election in 1992, trying to become the first senator ever to win a fourth term from Ohio. The Republican candidate, Lieutenant Governor R. Michael DeWine, attacked Glenn on Keating Five as well as a number of other matters, in one of the dirtiest campaigns in the country that year and the toughest of Glenn's senatorial contests. Glenn prevailed, however, defeating DeWine by nine percentage points to gain one more term in the Senate before retiring and not running for re-election in 1998, at age 77.

After 1999, the only member of the Keating Five remaining in the U.S. Senate was John McCain, who had an easier time gaining re-election in 1992 than he anticipated. He survived the political scandal in part by becoming friendly with the political press. McCain subsequently ran for president in 2000 and again in 2008; he became the Republican presidential nominee in 2008. During the 2000s, several retrospective accounts of the controversy reiterated the contention that McCain was included in the investigation primarily so that there would be at least one Republican target. Glenn's inclusion in the investigation has been attributed to Republicans who were angered by the inclusion of McCain, as well as committee members who thought that dropping Glenn (and McCain) would make it look bad for the remaining three Democratic senators.

The scandal was followed by a number of attempts to adopt campaign finance reform—spearheaded by U.S. Sen. David Boren (D-OK)—but most attempts died in committee. A weakened reform was passed in 1993. Substantial campaign finance reform was not passed until the adoption of the McCain-Feingold Act in 2002. Bennett would later write that the Keating Five investigation did make a difference, as members of Congress were afterward far less likely to intercede with federal investigations on behalf of contributors.

In early October 2008, the Keating Five scandal, its possible parallel to the subprime mortgage crisis and the 2008 financial crisis, and specifically the role in the scandal of Republican presidential nominee McCain, were briefly emphasized by the campaign of his Democratic opponent, Barack Obama, through a 13-minute "documentary" entitled Keating Economics. This introduction occurred after the McCain campaign began emphasizing the Obama–Ayers controversy. The Keating Five matter otherwise had little impact on McCain's eventually unsuccessful campaign for President.

== Reports ==
- United States Senate Select Committee on Ethics. Preliminary inquiry into allegations regarding Senators Cranston, DeConcini, Glenn, McCain, and Riegle, and Lincoln Savings and Loan: Open session hearings before the Select Committee on Ethics, United States Senate, One Hundred First Congress, second session, November 15, 1990, through January 16, 1991. Washington D.C.: Government Printing Office, 1991.
- United States Senate Select Committee on Ethics. Senate Select Committee on Ethics, Investigation of Senator Alan Cranston together with Additional Views, Report of the Senate Select Committee on Ethics, S. Rep. No. 223, 102d Cong., 1st Sess. 36 (November 20, 1991). Washington D.C.: Government Printing Office, 1991.

== General references ==
- Alexander, Paul (2002). Man of the People: The Life of John McCain. Hoboken, New Jersey: John Wiley & Sons. ISBN 0-471-22829-X.
- Bennett, Robert S. (2008). In the Ring: The Trials of a Washington Lawyer. Random House. ISBN 978-0-307-39443-9.
- Binstein, Michael; Bowden, Charles (1993). Trust Me: Charles Keating and the Missing Billions. Random House. ISBN 0-679-41699-4.
- Germond, Jack; Witcover, Jules (1989). Whose Broad Stripes and Bright Stars? The Trivial Pursuit of the Presidency 1988. Warner Books. ISBN 0-446-51424-1.
- Gould, Lewis J. (2005). The Most Exclusive Club: A History of the Modern United States Senate. Basic Books. ISBN 0-465-02778-4.
- Grossman, Mark (2003). Political Corruption in America: An Encyclopedia of Scandals, Power, and Greed. ABC-CLIO. ISBN 1-57607-060-3.
- Karaagac, John (2000). John McCain: An Essay in Military and Political History. Lexington Books. ISBN 0-7391-0171-4.
- Kurtz, Howard (1994). Media Circus: The Trouble with America's Newspapers (paperback). Times Books. ISBN 0-8129-6356-3.
- McCain, John; Salter, Mark (2002). Worth the Fighting For. New York: Random House. ISBN 0-375-50542-3.
- Mitchell, Andrea (2007). Talking Back: To Presidents, Dictators, and Assorted Scoundrels. Penguin Books. ISBN 978-0-14-303873-3.
- Mondak, Jeffrey J. (1995). Nothing to Read: Newspapers and Elections in a Social Experiment. University of Michigan Press. ISBN 0-472-06599-8.
- Pizzo, Stephen; Fricker, Mary; Muolo, Paul (1989). Inside Job: The Looting of America's Savings and Loans. McGraw-Hill. ISBN 0-07-050230-7.
- Regens, James; Gaddie, Ronald (1996). The Economic Realities of Political Reform: Elections and the U.S. Senate. Cambridge University Press. ISBN 0-521-47468-X.
- Roberts, Robert North; Doss, Marion T. (1997). From Watergate to Whitewater: The Public Integrity War. Greenwood Publishing Group. ISBN 0-275-95597-4.
- Seidman, L. William (1993). Full Faith and Credit: The Great S & L Debacle and Other Washington Sagas. Random House. ISBN 0-8129-2134-8.
- Tolchin, Martin; Tolchin, Susan J. (2003). Glass Houses: Congressional Ethics and the Politics of Venom. Westview Press. ISBN 0-8133-4161-2.
- Williams, Robert (1998). Political Scandals in the USA. Edinburgh University Press. ISBN 1-85331-189-8.
