= Savings and loan crisis =

US financial crisis from 1986 to 1995

External videos
- Booknotes interview with Martin Mayer on The Greatest-Ever Bank Robbery: The Collapse of the Savings and Loan Industry, November 25, 1990, C-SPAN

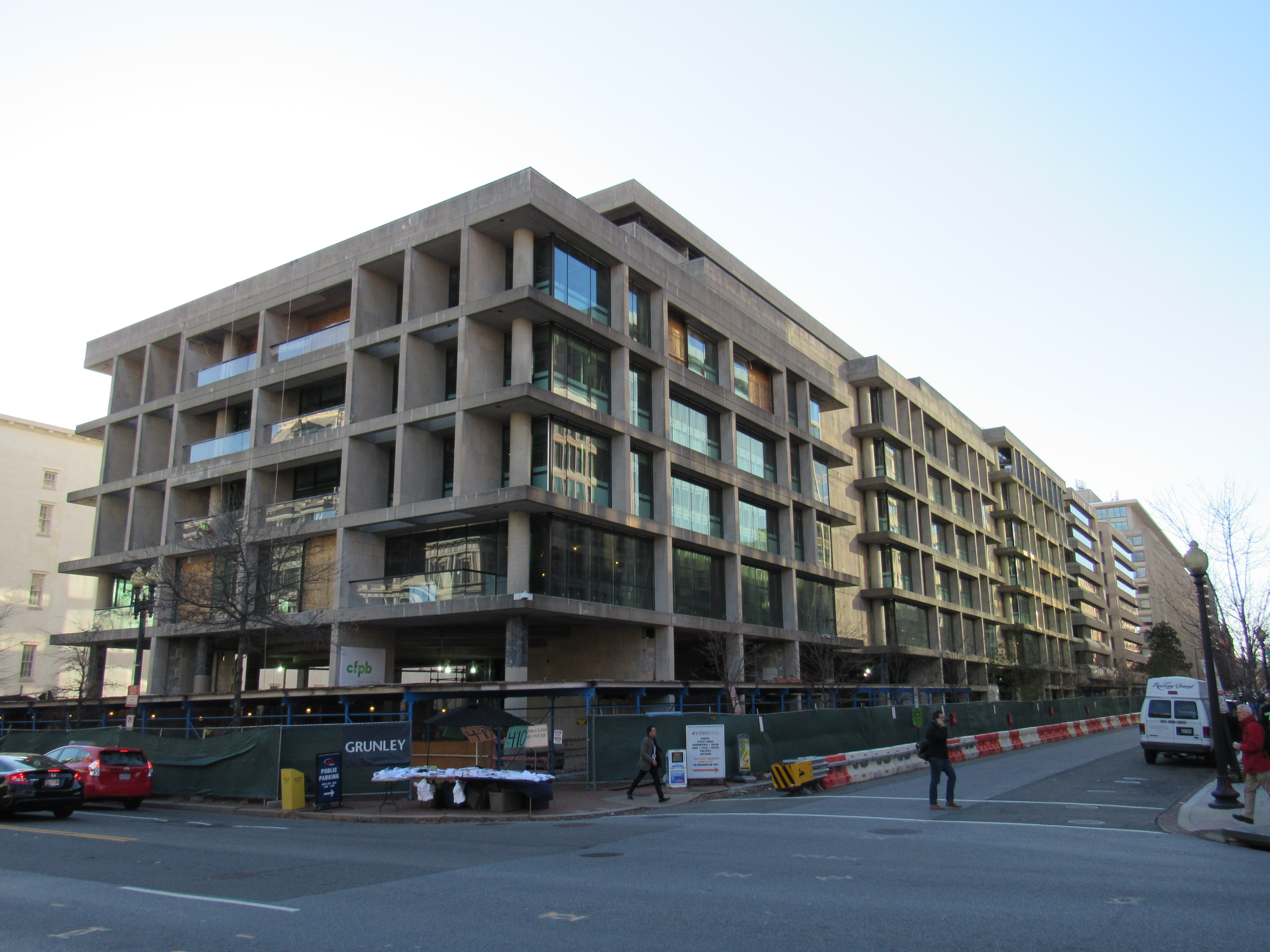
This building at 1700 G St NW in Washington, DC housed the Federal Home Loan Bank Board from the 1970s onward. It was built in 1976.

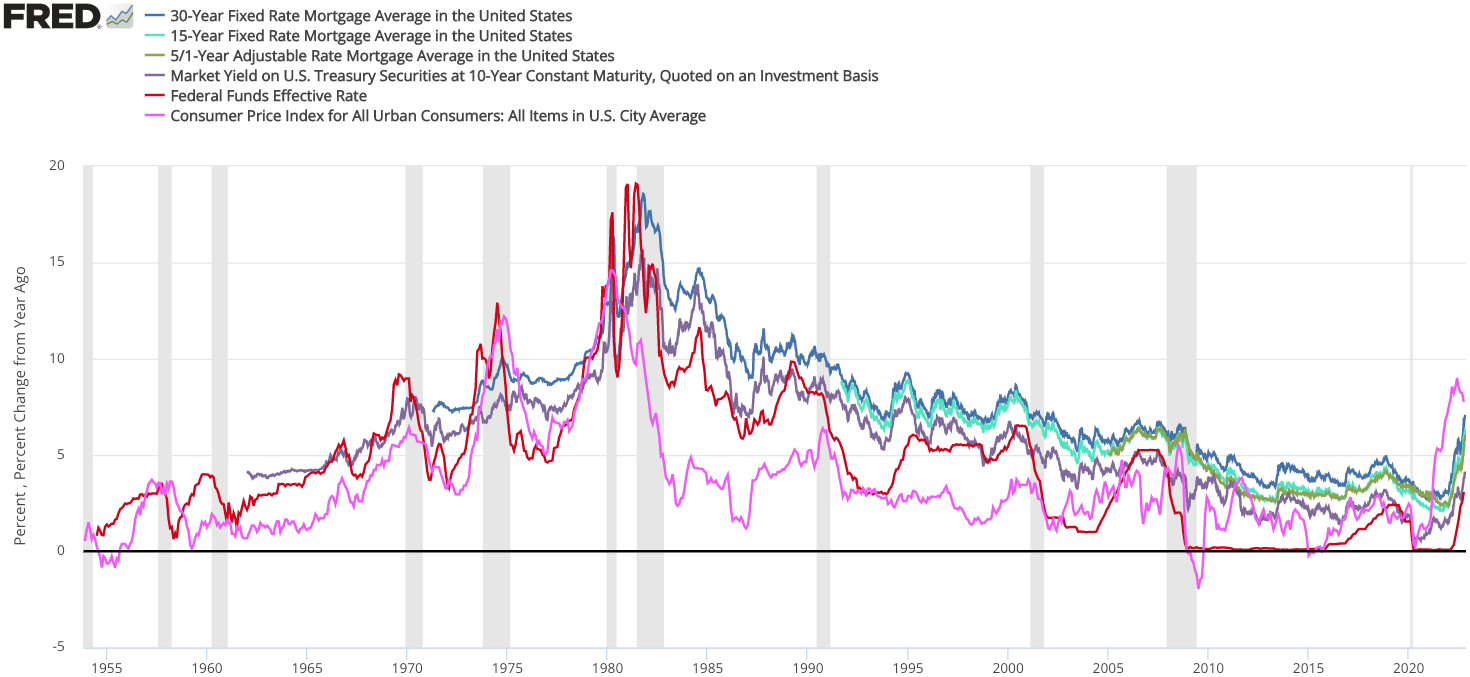
Mortgages and interest rates 30 year fixed rate mortgage 15 year fixed rate mortgage 5/1 adjustable rate mortgage 10 year treasury yield Effective Federal funds rate Inflation Consumer price index

The savings and loan crisis of the 1980s and 1990s (commonly dubbed the S&L crisis) was the failure of approximately a third of the savings and loan associations (S&Ls or thrifts) in the United States between 1986 and 1995. These thrifts were banks that historically specialized in fixed-rate mortgage lending. The Federal Savings and Loan Insurance Corporation (FSLIC) closed or otherwise resolved 296 thrifts from 1986 to 1989, whereupon the newly established Resolution Trust Corporation (RTC) took up these responsibilities. The two agencies closed 1,043 banks that held $519 billion in assets. The total cost of taxpayers by the end of 1999 was $123.8 billion with an additional $29.1 billion of losses imposed onto the thrift industry.

Starting in 1979 and through the early 1980s, the Federal Reserve sharply increased interest rates in an effort to reduce inflation. At that time, thrifts had issued long-term loans at fixed interest rates that were lower than prevailing deposit rates. Thrifts were forced to increase interest rates on deposits to retain them; this had, however, the effect of squeezing their net interest margins and creating large losses. Nor could outflowing deposits simply be paid out by sale of now less-valuable assets. The result was that about one third of S&Ls became insolvent, causing a first wave of failures in 1981–83.

When the problem became apparent, Congress acted to permit thrifts to engage in new lending activities with the hope that they would diversify and become more profitable. This included issuance of adjustable-rate mortgages and permission to enter into commercial real estate lending. Lower capital requirements and permissive accounting standards also allowed weaker thrifts to continue operating even though under the old rules or US GAAP they would have been insolvent. These changes allowed for substantial risk-taking and thrift industry growth. Many new thrifts were formed in the American southwest and levered themselves to substantial size rapidly. The regional concentration of thrift investments there, along with thrifts' inexperience in the new types of lending they had entered, proved highly fragile. When property prices in those regions dropped in 1986, a second and larger wave of failures started.

The thrift deposit insurer, the FSLIC, was unable to pay for all these failures and became insolvent. The FSLIC's financial weakness, along with congressional pressure, also forced regulators to engage in regulatory forbearance. This allowed insolvent thrifts to remain open and tied FSLIC to capital injections. Attempts to recapitalize the FSLIC arrived both too late and in insufficient amounts. Failures continued to mount through 1988 and by February 1989, congressional legislation – the Financial Institutions Reform, Recovery, and Enforcement Act of 1989 – was brought to establish the Resolution Trust Corporation to wind down all remaining insolvent thrifts. The law also brought more stringent capital regulations for thrifts and an increase in supervisory resources. Responsibility for thrift supervision and thrift deposit insurance were also transferred, respectively, to the then-new Office of Thrift Supervision and the Federal Deposit Insurance Corporation.

== Causes ==
Thrift institutions originated in the 19th century with the goal of pooling resources among members to make loans with which to purchase residential properties. The industry grew rapidly at over 10% annually in the postwar period amid government support for home financing. At the time, thrifts were regulated by two – or three, if state regulators are included, – institutions. Examinations were conducted by the Federal Home Loan Bank Board (FHLBB); but supervisory authority was separate and resided in regional Federal Home Loan Banks. Conflict of interest concerns also existed in the privately owned home loan banks, leading to poor working relationships between federal employee examiners and the private supervisors. Delays between examinations and their reports arriving to supervisors also meant that supervisory action, if it were to be taken, would be months late. Weak enforcement powers, along with thrifts' rights to contest unfavourable reports, meant the Federal Home Loan Bank Board was highly deferential to bank management.

=== Interest rate increases ===
The early 1980s saw a recession along with high interest rates, which stressed both thrift and other banking institutions considerably. Negative net interest margins, due to the low interest earned on assets with high deposit interest expenses needed to retain deposits, caused a wave of thrift failures between 1981 and 1983. Federal regulations, especially Regulation Q, placed caps on deposit interest rates. Depositors responded by withdrawing their cash and depositing them in money market mutual funds. In response to these outflows, Congress passed the Depository Institutions Deregulation and Monetary Control Act of 1980 which phased out Regulation Q interest rate caps and expanded thrift lending powers to include construction loans. The deposit insurance limit was also raised from 40,000 to 100,000 dollars per account. The phase-out of deposit interest rate caps, however, caused thrifts' deposit interest expenses to increase substantially as they scrambled to retain depositors. The resulting decline in profitability led to a wave of thrift failures in 1981–83.

Many of these failures were outside of their managers' control. The high and volatile interest rates in the early 1980s meant that even thrifts with diversified residential mortgage portfolios, constrained by existing price caps, became unable to meet their obligations. The historical institutional characteristics of thrift institutions – low loss rates accompanied by low earnings and capital – were stable but severely challenged by these market conditions.

=== Deregulation and commercial lending ===
Thrift examination activities
Year	Exams per thrift	Exams per asset (billions)
1980	0.80	5.41
1981	0.85	4.96
1982	0.85	4.08
1983	0.68	2.62
1984	0.75	2.40

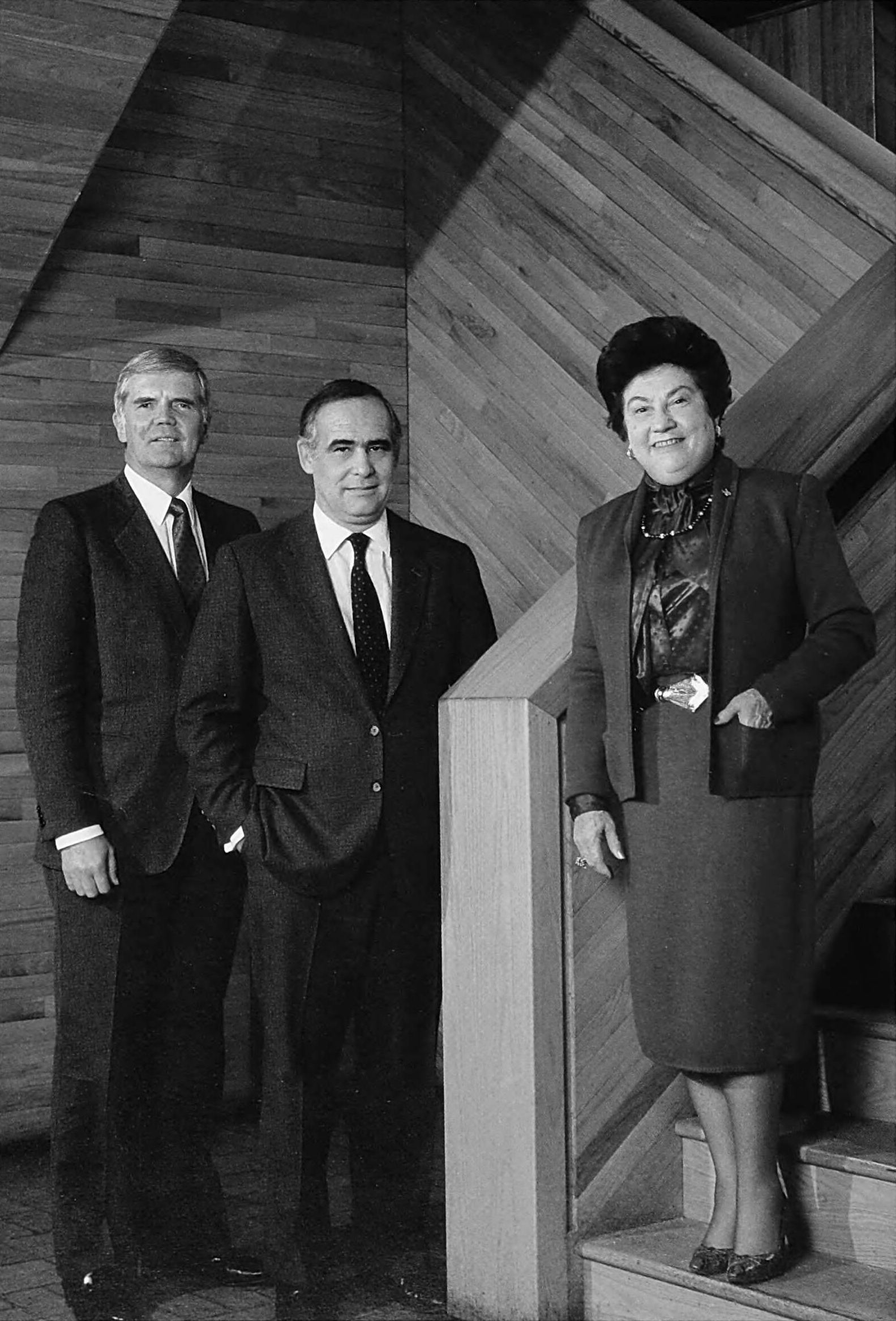
Federal Home Loan Bank Board members, pictured in the Board's 1985 annual report. From left to right, Donald I. Hovde, Edwin J. Gray (chairman), and Mary A. Grigsby.

The 1982 Garn–St. Germain Depository Institutions Act completed a process of deregulation that provided relief to weak thrifts by allowing their deposit insurer, the Federal Savings and Loan Insurance Corporation (FSLIC), to provide direct capital injections through "net worth certificates". The Garn–St. Germain Act also hugely expanded thrift lending powers, allowing them to engage in commercial real estate and line-of-credit lending, which many thrifts eagerly exploited. Between 1980 and 1986, thrifts' residential mortgage holdings as a proportion of assets fell from over 80 percent to less than 60.

These new lending powers were not accompanied by any increase in supervisory resources or powers. The view at the time was that the interest rate environment would quickly ease, allowing for thrifts to restructure their asset portfolios, and that expanded lending powers would allow for thrifts to diversify their portfolios and engage in more profitable lending activities. It was expected that thrifts would continue being the relatively docile institutions they had then always been and diversify their portfolios prudently; few believed at the time that these deregulatory episodes would allow thrifts to engage in excessively risky lending.

Many of the loans made under expanded lending powers were concentrated in rapidly-growing states such as California, Florida, and Texas. Lax state supervision and highly permissive leverage restraints allowed thrifts in these states to expand rapidly, taking on considerable risk concentrated in these business lines and geographic regions. The highly-sensitive nature of commercial real estate values to local economic conditions made these thrifts highly sensitive in turn to those local economic conditions. These issues were compounded by the relative inexperience of thrift staff in evaluating risks of commercial lending and equity investments.

The deregulatory policy of the Reagan administration, enforced by its appointment of thrift executive Edwin J. Gray, reduced thrift examinations between 1981 and 1984 by 26 percent. Normalized per institution or by assets held, FSLIC-insured institutions' supervisory resources were stretched. However, Gray's position reversed after the fraud-induced failure of Texas-based Empire Savings and Loan: he spent the next two years increasing examination resources and tightening financial regulations. Such efforts were, however, not supported by industry groups or the Reagan administration.

=== Forbearance ===
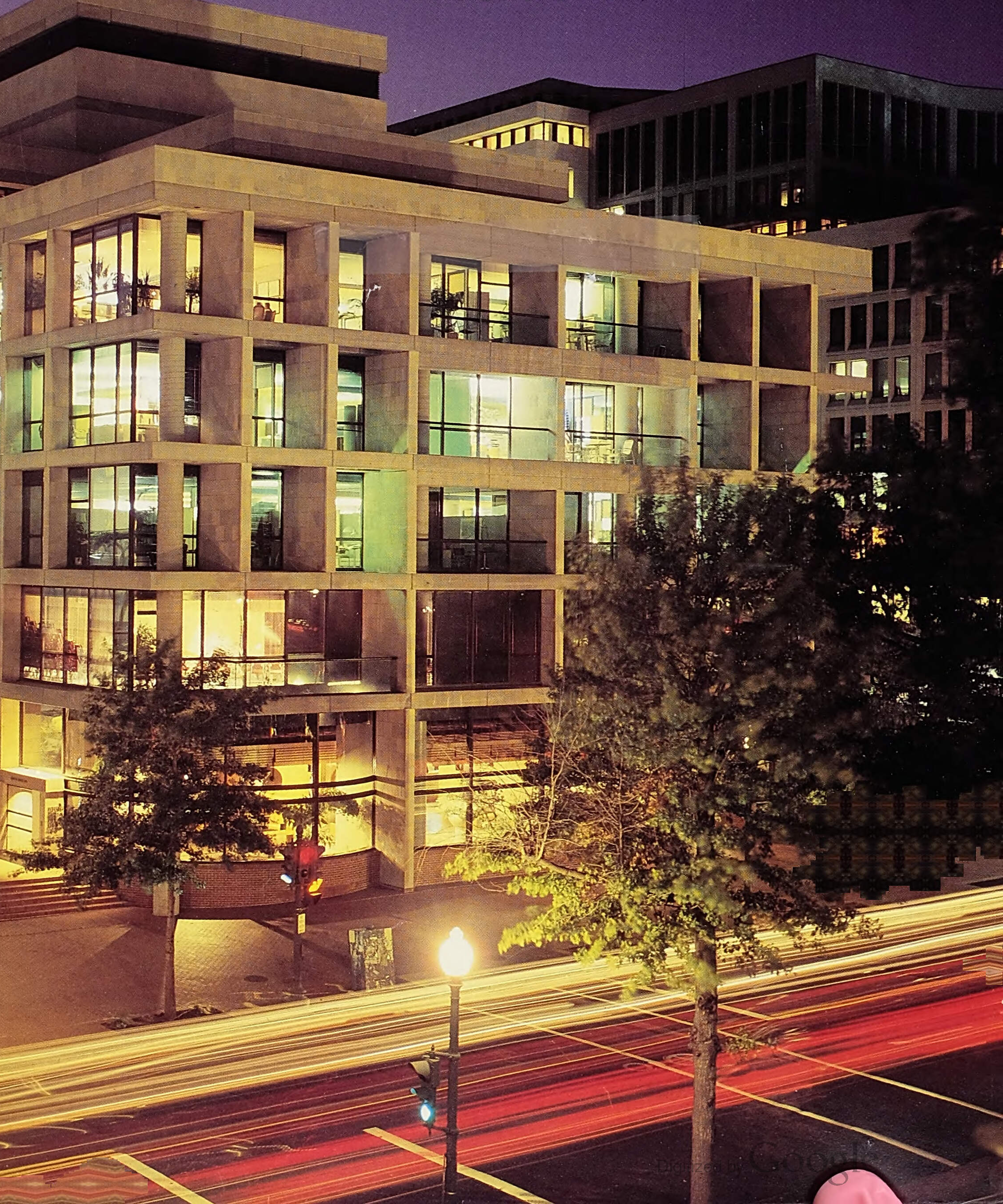
FLHBB was headquartered in this building at 1700 G St NW in Washington DC, here depicted in a photograph on the cover of the December 1984 issue of the FHLBB Journal.

Attempts to smooth over rough market environments included considerable regulatory forbearance: when a regulator decides not to apply regulations that normally would disrupt the operation of a bank. The FHLBB therefore progressively lowered net worth requirements from five percent in 1980 to three percent in 1982. Lax phase-in rules also meant that many newer savings and loan institutions could be required to have net worth requirements lower than three percent; in fact, new institutions could be levered from two million dollars in capital to $1.3 billion in assets (a multiple of 650) in about a year.

FHLBB also chose to adopt regulatory accounting principles which allowed institutions to defer reporting of losses and treat more instruments as capital. Accounting rules over supervisory goodwill (a type of intangible asset) were also liberalized, making it easier for thrifts to purchase insolvent thrifts. Since this substituted for the normal cash injections from FSLIC due to the insurer's limited financial resources, this utilised such goodwill as essentially an accounting fiction. Such lenient accounting rules, however, also had the effect of preventing the FHLBB from intervening against thinly capitalised institutions whose balance sheets were supported by intangibles. Policy responses chosen by the Reagan administration, and adopted by the FHLBB under pressure, also led to demands not to use taxpayer money. Along with political demands not to alarm the public by closing institutions, these constraints forced FHLBB into a policy of "hiding the poor condition of [thrifts] behind accounting gimmicks".

By 1983, even though the interest rate environment had substantially eased, a tenth of thrifts were insolvent on a GAAP basis, with those institutions controlling 35 percent of thrift industry assets. Even so, such institutions were allowed to continue operating and thereby exposed taxpayers to eventual losses through their failure and following deposit insurance claims.

=== Fraud ===
Several high-profile casualties of the crisis involved fraud. A variety of methods were identified. For example, a thrift officer could extract compensation and other benefits from origination fees on low-quality loans. Alternatively, they could collude with developers to book paper profits that were extracted and eventually placed on the government, or simply pay themselves high compensation until the thrift became bankrupt, and place the responsibility for paying off depositors onto FSLIC. William K. Black gained considerable notoriety for his leadership in prosecuting Charles Keating, who was temporarily successful in blocking Black's investigations, because campaign contributions coordinated by Keating had saved Jim Wright from financial ruin and elevated him to the Speaker of the House. Keating also had bought support from five US Senators, but it was not enough to keep him out of prison. Black said that many senior executives can find accountants and auditors willing to conspire to commit fraud; he coined the term "control fraud" to describe this phenomenon.

However, such fraud was not the core reason for the crisis. Estimates of the number of failures that involved fraud or insider abuse ranges considerably due to the difficulty in detecting fraud and distinguishing it from bad business judgment. An Office of the Comptroller of the Currency study in 1988 indicated fraud in 11 percent of failures between 1979 and 1987; a Federal Deposit Insurance Corporation study indicated involvement in 25 percent of failures in 1989; a Resolution Trust Corporation study in 1992 found fraud in 33 percent of its cases; and a 1994 General Accounting Office study reported 26 percent of banks that failed in 1990–91 had issues with fraud. The most clear cases of fraud both within and without of the thrift system were concentrated in a few large institutions that had grown substantially and were alleged to have conspired to manipulate junk bond markets with thrift directors for personal gain.

Regardless, there was fraud and insider abuse in many cases. The Crime Control Act of 1990, after the crisis, established a special counsel to investigate and prosecute fraud in financial institutions. Between 1988 and 1992, the Department of Justice sent 1,706 bankers to prison and found guilty verdicts in 2,603 cases. Expert estimates as of a Congressional Budget Office report in 1992 as to the proportion of losses due to fraud eventually borne by the government range from three to 25 percent, with a more narrow consensus estimate in the range 10–15 percent (corresponding to taxpayer losses of 16–24 billion dollars).

== Thrift failures ==
Insolvent thrift institutions (1980–89)
Year	# of thrifts	# insolvent	% insolvent
1980	3,993	43	1.1%
1981	3,751	112	3.0%
1982	3,287	415	12.6%
1983	3,146	515	16.4%
1984	3,136	695	22.2%
1985	3,246	705	21.7%
1986	3,220	672	20.9%
1987	3,147	672	21.4%
1988	2,949	508	17.2%
1989	2,878	516	17.9%

Realisation of interest-rate risk in the early 1980s led to a short series of failures that impelled a deregulatory episode from 1980 to 1981. The failure of Empire Savings and Loan in 1984 also drove the FHLBB to reverse course and tighten regulations on thrifts. Such actions were too late, however, since the poor loans had already been made and were already on thrift balance sheets.

The condition of the banking system as a whole was also not entirely solid. The rapidly changing legal environment, along with new financial technologies, also destabilised commercial banks. 1984 saw the largest commercial bank failure to date, that of Continental Illinois, which was infamously branded "too big to fail". The bank failed amid a rise in foreign non-performing loans (mostly in Latin America) and an electronic bank run. The FDIC stepped in to prevent the failure of almost 2,300 smaller banks which had their money in Continental and a general panic.

Moreover, even by 1983, FSLIC's reserves were clearly inadequate for the thrifts that had already by that time failed: with just a bit more than six billion dollars in reserve, outstanding claims by that point already totalled $25 billion.

=== Intensification ===
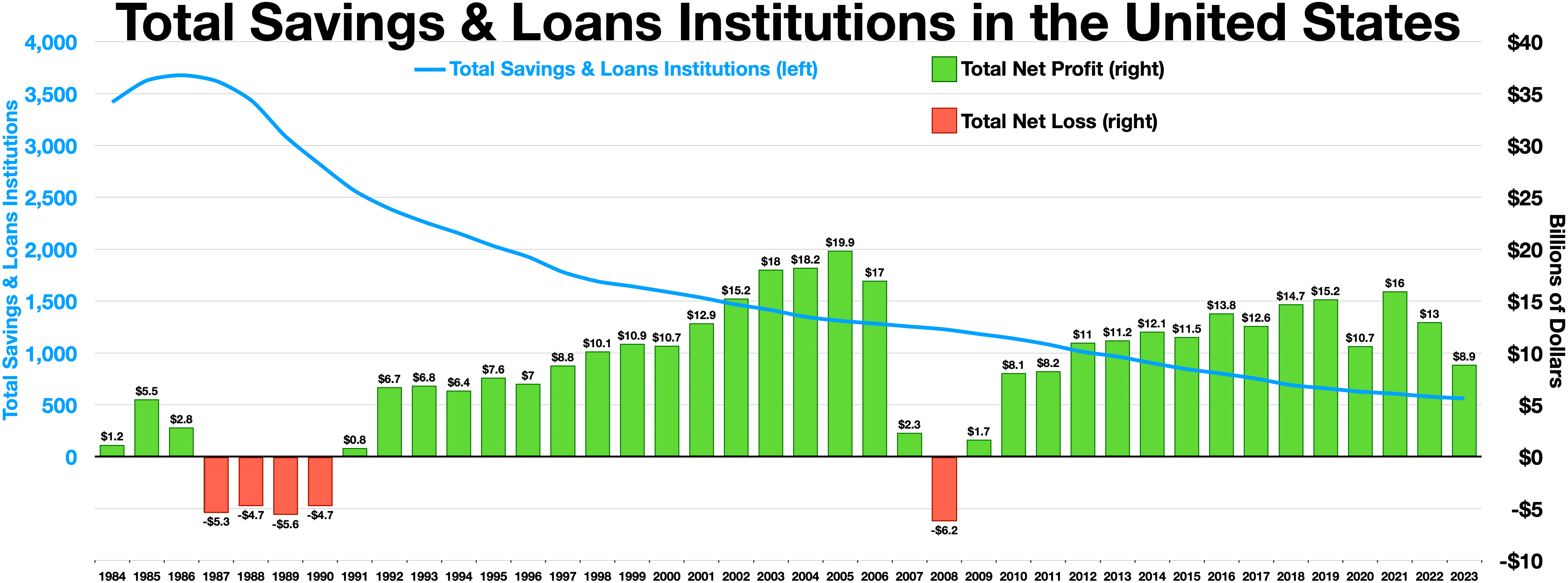
Total Savings & Loans Institutions in the United States

Losses reported by thrifts through to 1985 were mostly deferred due to the lax accounting rules in place and covered by positive real estate values in the southwestern United States. The first major thrifts to go were in Ohio and Maryland in 1985. That March, Home State Savings Bank of Cincinnati, Ohio collapsed after a depositor run triggered by news that it had lost $540 million in a securities scam. Not insured by the federal government via FSLIC, it was instead insured by a private state insurance program. This program became promptly insolvent and the governor, Richard F. Celeste, ordered the first bank holiday since the Great Depression. In Maryland, that May, Old Court Savings and Loans similarly failed. The panic also spread across Maryland thrifts, which also insured by their state and not the federal government. The governor, Harry R. Hughes, capped deposit withdrawals; by June, the Maryland legislature ordered all state-insured thrifts either to become FSLIC members or liquidate in six months. The thrift failures in Ohio and Maryland cost those states' taxpayers some 250 million dollars.

A sharp regional recession in the southwestern United States and Texas, caused by a drop in oil prices, caused a fall in the value of commercial real estate in those areas. Thrifts in those states, highly exposed to local commercial real estate prices through their heavy aggressive lending activities, quickly became insolvent. Pressure compounded on banks due to follow-on real estate effects and an agricultural recession in Great Plains states. The elimination of favorable tax treatment for real estate construction in the Tax Reform Act of 1986 also contributed to a slowdown in constructing lending and lowered real estate values.

=== FSLIC recapitalization ===
FSLIC reserves (1980–89)
Year	Reserves (billions $)
1980	6.5
1981	6.2
1982	6.3
1983	6.4
1984	5.6
1985	4.6
1986	–6.3
1987	–13.7
1988	–75.0
1989	Dissolved

The failures in 1985–86 were extremely expensive for FSLIC. Resolving those failures cost $7.4 billion in 1985 and $9.1 billion in 1986. This brought the FSLIC reserve fund to less than $2 billion on the eve of 1987. Compounding this, the size of the thrift industry had expanded considerably, meaning that the money in that reserve fund was spread thin. FSLIC's immediate response to raise revenue by increasing deposit insurance premia. It also sought to restrict thrift taking of brokered deposits, which it viewed as fuelling thrift growth. However, those regulations were stuck down by a federal court and may regardless have done little to enforce asset quality. Further regulations in 1984–85 attempted to slow the growth of thrift institutions and change the calculation of regulatory capital to better match current conditions; regulatory personnel were also taken on to examine banks for compliance with these regulations.

Credit losses, however, came too quickly for this re-regulatory push to have much impact. With insufficient resources to handle those losses, FSLIC's sought to defer sale of institutions and assets so that they could be handled with the limited resources on hand. The Reagan administration recognized by April 1986 that FSLIC was itself approaching insolvency; it asked Congress for $15 billion to pay for FSLIC costs through bonds sold against future FSLIC premia. Little was done on the matter and the issue of insolvency was played down to avoid alarm and unfavorable press. By January 1987, the problems were of such magnitude that it was the first piece of business in the new session. However, specifics of the funding bill were harshly debated. The thrift industry group, supported by House Speaker Jim Wright, insisted on less than $7.5 billion and compulsory regulatory forbearance. While the administration resented the inclusion of regulatory forbearance, public news of FSLIC's impending (or already actual) insolvency in a GAO report led the administration to accept regulatory forbearance for more money. The resulting Competitive Equality Banking Act was signed on August 11, 1987, giving FSLIC $10.8 billion through sale of bonds via an off-balance sheet government entity. It also required thrift supervisors not to close thrifts that had equity ratios of more than 0.5 percent which met rather lax business viability criteria.

The effect of the 1987 act was that risky institutions were unrestrained in their risk-taking behaviors. They then attempted to "gamble for resurrection", hoping that even riskier lending would allow them to get sufficient profits to stave off bankruptcy. The effect of assistance also engendered moral hazard, where owners could accrue profits from risky loans but place losses at the feet of taxpayers.

At the end of 1988, 2,969 thrifts remained active. This was over three hundred less than in 1985 and over a thousand less than in 1980. These failures were highly geographically concentrated: a third of the failures from 1985 forward occurred in just three states: California, Texas, and Florida; Texas accounted for 40 percent of thrift failures in the worst year of the crisis, 1988. Faced with so many institutions, FHLBB, under its new chairman M. Danny Wall, attempted to sell off hundreds of insolvent thrifts in receivership. These sales could only be accomplished with substantial government support and although it allowed FSLIC to dispose of almost 200 thrifts by the end of 1988, some 250 insolvent institutions with $81 billion in assets remained.

=== FIRREA and the RTC ===
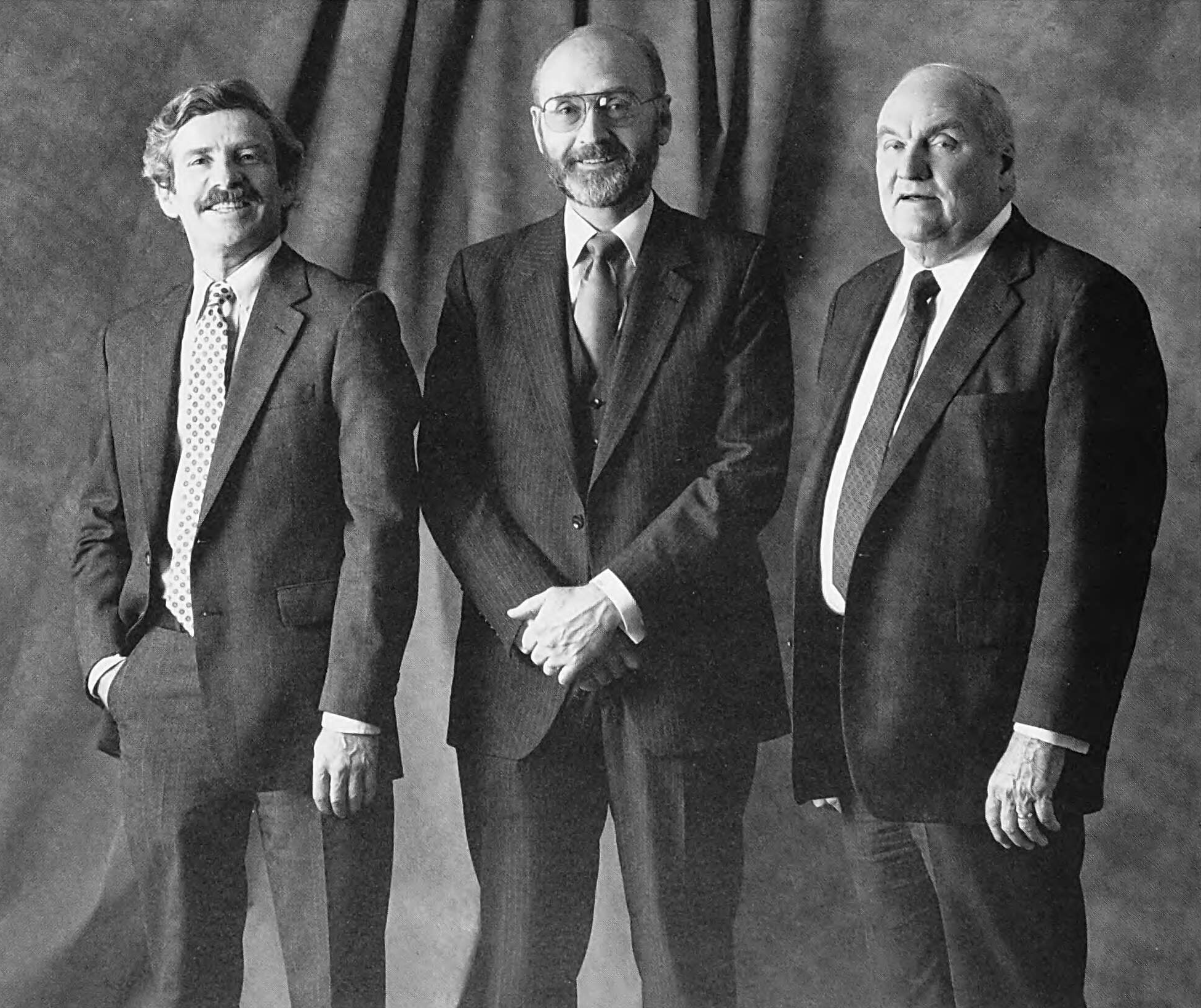
The final members of the Federal Home Loan Bank Board, pictured in its 1988 annual report. The chairman M. Danny Wall, in center, became the first director of the Office of Thrift Supervision pursuant to FIRREA.

The number of banks that were formally insolvent under FHLBB regulatory guidelines at the end of 1988 was 250, however, the number insolvent after excluding intangible assets more than doubled to 508. These insolvent thrifts continued to lose money rapidly. Moreover, FSLIC at the same time was itself insolvent. The new president, George H. W. Bush, announced a proposal on February 6, 1989, to resolve the thrift failures. The plan included three major elements: a temporary agency would be created with 50 billion dollars in funding to liquidate the insolvent thrift institutions with that money being raised via another off-balance sheet vehicle paid for by higher insurance premia on the thrift industry; the FHLBB and FSLIC would be dissolved, with supervisory powers devolving to the incipient Office of Thrift Supervision within the Treasury Department and the FDIC; regulations would be tightened as well, with regulatory capital no longer including intangibles such as goodwill and doubled to six percent within two years. On August 9, 1989, the proposals brought by Bush were passed essentially unchanged as the Financial Institutions Reform, Recovery, and Enforcement Act of 1989 into law. Many other regulatory provisions were also included, such as risk-based capital applied to thrifts, re-imposition of restrictions on thrifts' non-residential mortgage portfolios, and funding for financial crimes prosecutions.

The Resolution Trust Corporation, created by the act, sold or liquidated all remaining thrifts. Those institutions remained for the time being in operation under conservatorship. The RTC was also given generous amounts of time to sell assets in small tranches: buyers were more willing to purchase smaller portions and the RTC was also able to assess and market its assets. The closure of FSLIC and the creation of RTC only to sell or liquidate insolvent institutions also forced thrift owners to take fewer risks since they knew that assistance would no longer be forthcoming. In 1989 the RTC disposed of 37 thrifts at a cost of $51 billion, which came under fire from congressional leadership. The next year, 1990, saw the sale of 315 institutions at a cost of $20 billion. Congress, although criticizing the RTC for its ballooning staff, appropriated an additional $30 billion in March 1991. Late in that year, many of the assets bundled into mortgage-backed and commercial-paper backed securities. Amid a funding deficiency, the RTC was forced to shut down operations in 1991, but after new appropriations in 1993, the RTC was wound down by year-end 1996. Overall, it recovered 78 percent of the book value of all assets and disposed of 747 thrift institutions with $402.6 billion in assets.

== Scandals ==
A number of high-profile thrift failures and scandals also emerged from the crisis. Notable institutions included:

- Lamar Savings and Loan (Austin, TX), led by Stanley Adams, which cost $2 billion to resolve;
- Vernon Savings and Loan (Dallas, TX), led by Don Dixon, which on resolution had 94 percent of loans non-performing; and
- Columbia Savings and Loan (Beverly Hills, CA), led by Thomas Spiegel, was closed in January 1991 at the cost of $3.25 billion.

Especially publicized was the insolvency of Lincoln Savings and Loan Association, led by influential Republican donor and political figure Charles Keating. Between 1984 and 1989 it grew five-fold, investing mainly in commercial property and equities. After supervisors recommended the thrift be seized for criminal fraud in 1987, Keating leaned on senators Dennis DeConcini (D-AZ), John McCain (R-AZ), Alan Cranston (D-CA), John Glenn (D-OH), and Donald Riegle (D-MI) to curtail the investigation. When it became known that the five men, later dubbed the Keating Five, had received $1.3 million in campaign contributions, they became embroiled in a congressional ethics investigation. Eventually, the matter was dropped by the new FHLBB chairman, Danny Wall, who later resigned in December 1989 for failure to take action against Lincoln, which failed that year at a cost of $2.6 billion. Keating was eventually prosecuted and convicted, but the convictions were overturned due to incorrect jury instructions and, later, a poisoned jury. Eventually, in 1999, he pled guilty and was sentenced to time served.

Other figures were similarly drawn in to allegations of fraud and corruption. Neil Bush, the son of then-vice president George H. W. Bush, was hauled before Congress and sued by the FDIC for his involvement in Silverado Savings and Loan (Denver, CO), which failed in December 1989.

== Consequences ==
Thrifts were not the only financial institutions adversely affected in the 1980s. Many banks failed as well. Between 1980 and 1994, 1,617 commercial banks failed (9.14 percent of all banks) with total assets of $206 billion. However, the overlapping regional banking crises in the 1980s were far less severe on the commercial banking side because the FDIC remained solvent. Moreover, the federal commercial bank regulators were more proactive in their approaches to limit growth and enforce capital requirements; the FDIC's financial solvency meant, unlike FSLIC, a policy of regulatory forbearance was not forced on it by circumstance.

=== Taxpayer losses and macroecoomic impact ===
In just the years 1986 to 1995, the number of federally insured thrifts about halved from 3,234 to 1,645. 1,043 thrifts failed with total assets of over $519 billion. Congress ultimately appropriated $105 billion to the Resolution Trust Corporation, though only $91.3 billion were ever used. After banks repaid loans through various procedures, by the end of 1999, taxpayers suffered combined FSLIC and RTC expenses of $123.8 billion with an additional $29.1 billion (approximately 19 percent) of losses imposed onto the thrift industry. Approximately $60 billion of those losses were attributable to regulatory forbearance as required by the Competitive Equality Banking Act of 1987.

The impact of the crisis on the US economy is debated. At the time, the successive rounds of thrift failures were the largest since the banking crisis during the Great Depression. Estimates of the cumulative loss in output caused by the savings and loan crisis are, however, comparatively mild in comparison both to the 2008 banking crisis and the Depression. Estimates in 1994 of the impact of the crisis on US output placed it around 0.5 percent of GDP, with the impact fading over the following two decades.

=== Impact on thrifts ===
The higher insurance premia along with regulatory burdens, without concomitant legal powers, that were enacted by FIRREA led to progressive exits from the thrift industry over the 1990s as thrifts re-chartered themselves as commercial banks. Changes in thrift powers also meant that they lost their distinctiveness vis-à-vis commercial banks: between 1980 and 1995 the share of 1–4 family mortgages originated by thrift institutions fell from 47 percent to 15. In the aftermath of the crisis, even the words "savings and loan" became less common as thrift institutions renamed themselves merely as "bank" or "savings bank".

Bank regulators' powers were also strengthened. The FDIC Improvement Act of 1991 expanded federal banking agencies' examination authority, requiring annual inspections and sufficient examination staff for those inspections. Moreover, the agencies received prompt corrective action powers to compel banks to recapitalize when falling below certain capital thresholds. Such orders were also backed up by further powers to suspend banks' legal authority to do certain types of business, to ban fragile banks from paying out dividends, or to replace bank directors. Furthermore, restrictions were also imposed on how long banks could stay open while below minimum regulatory capital requirements, putting a "hard stop" of 90 days after which a bank must be placed into receivership. Public awareness of the problems of a lack of geographic diversification enforced by law also may have played a role in the passage of the Riegle–Neal Interstate Banking and Branching Efficiency Act of 1994, which lifted historical restrictions on banks operating across state lines.

== See also ==
- Financial crisis
- List of largest bank failures in the United States
- Subprime mortgage crisis
- Cottage Savings Ass'n v. Commissioner, a United States Supreme Court case dealing with the tax consequences of the S&L crisis
- United States v. Winstar Corp., a U.S. Supreme Court case that gives a concise but useful history of the crisis and the accounting practices that aggravated that crisis
