= Old Court Savings and Loans =

Old Court Savings and Loan (Old Court Thrift Savings) was a savings and loan association headquartered in Pikesville, Maryland, United States, that failed due to embezzlement by its president Jeffrey Levitt, which led to the failure of the state deposit insurance corporation.

== Collapse of state deposit insurance corporation ==
In 1962 Maryland established a quasi-public non-profit corporation, the Maryland Savings-Share Insurance Corporation (MSSIC), to insure accounts held in state chartered savings and loan associations. In May 1985, rumors emerged of financial instability at two thrifts, Old Court and Merritt Commercial Savings and Loan. Old Court had recently grown from $86 million in deposits to $839 million in only three years by offering high deposit interest rates, allowing it to make risky loans. Merritt was considered to be at risk as a result of loans made to a failed repo company. The rumors led to depositors questioning whether MSSIC was financially able to guarantee all of the deposits, resulting in a run on all state savings and loan associations. This led to the withdrawal of deposits, the failure of Old Court and the subsequent collapse of MSSIC. To temporarily protect other state savings and loan associations, Governor Harry Hughes issued an executive order limiting withdrawals to $1000 per month. The Maryland General Assembly during two special sessions in 1985 established the Maryland Deposit Insurance Fund (MDIF) to replace the MSSIC.

== Conviction of Levitt ==
Old Court President Jeffrey Levitt was charged in relation to the failure of the bank, and pleaded guilty to theft and misappropriation of bank funds. He served 6 years in Maryland prison before being released on parole in 1993. He then moved to Florida and opened a cigar shop.

== Subsequent events ==
The failure of the state bank insurance systems of Maryland, Ohio, and Arizona presaged the national collapse of the Federal Savings and Loan Insurance Corporation. It also resulted in the Supreme Court case Tafflin v. Levitt regarding whether civil claims brought under the Racketeer Influenced and Corrupt Organizations Act could be heard in state court.

== See also ==
- Savings and loan crisis
- Home State Savings Bank
