= Presidential transition of Ronald Reagan =

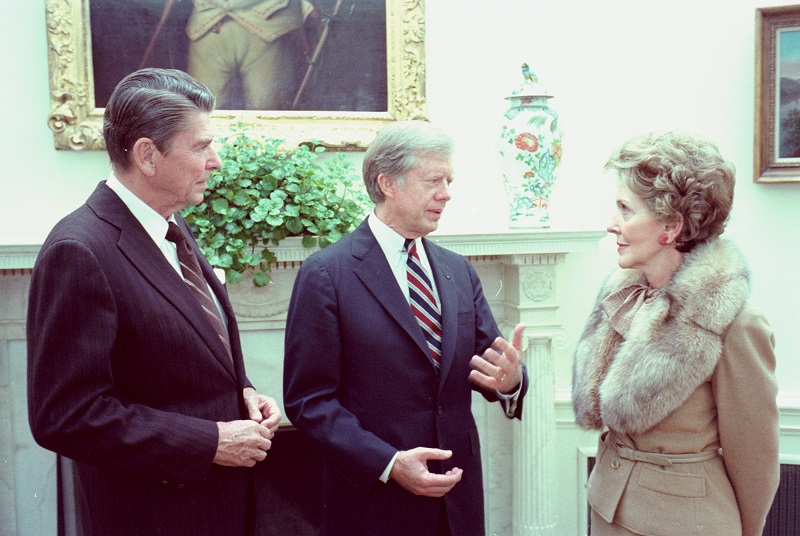
- President Jimmy Carter (center) meeting with President-elect Ronald Reagan (right) and his wife Nancy in the Oval Office of the White House on November 20, 1980.
- Election date: November 4, 1980
- Inauguration date: January 20, 1981
- President-elect: Ronald Reagan (Republican)
- Vice president-elect: George H. W. Bush (Republican)
- Outgoing president: Jimmy Carter (Democrat)
- Outgoing vice president: Walter Mondale (Democrat)
- Headquarters: 1726 M Street, Washington, D.C.
- Director: Edwin Meese

Ronald Reagan's presidential transition began when he won the 1980 United States presidential election, becoming the president-elect, and ended when Reagan was inaugurated on January 20, 1981.

The transition was led by Edwin Meese and was headquartered in Washington, D.C.. It was a particularly large operation, with between more than 1,000 or 1,500 people involved, including both volunteers and paid staff.

== Pre-election developments ==
Early discussions of plans for a presidential transition for Reagan were begun in late 1979.

More substantive planning for a potential presidential transition by Reagan began in the Spring of 1980, substantially before the Republican National Convention was held. Reagan's transition planning began even earlier than that of the previous Carter transition. The transition planning started with task forces to shape Reagan's potential administration's foreign policy and budget policies. This pre-election transition effort began with 70 staffers, but would grow to 132 staffers. Outside think tanks such as The Heritage Foundation contributed to the policy efforts.

The pre-election transition planning effort was overseen by Pendleton James. In this role, James kept a generally low public profile, and avoided media. He also kept positive relations with Reagan's campaign team. He had been approached by Reagan campaign figure Edwin Meese in the fall of 1979 about planning for how to assemble a potential presidential administration for Reagan. Meese himself had previously done some research into the logistics of a presidential transition during Reagan's previous 1976 presidential campaign, having even had conversations about it with people who had previously worked for Richard Nixon and Gerald Ford. Helene von Damm acted as James' deputy in overseeing the pre-election transition planning effort.

By September 1980, Reagan associates had formed a Presidential Transition Trust to collect contributions to finance a transition effort that would search for candidates to fill key positions in a Reagan administration. Lawyers of the Federal Election Commission, in September, drafted an advisory opinion that stated that, so long as the transition trust was "completely separate" from Reagan's campaign committee and funds raised by the trust did not go towards assisting in Reagan's election, such a trust would be allowed to operate outside of campaign finance laws that limited individual contributions to $1,000 (and Political Action Committee contributions to $5,0000). The trust opted to voluntarily limit contributions to a maximum of $5,000 per individual.

It was in September that the existence of this planning effort became public knowledge, with the New York Times reporting on it in mid-September.

In 1987, historian Carl M. Brauer described Reagan's pre-election transition planning effort as "modest in scope, and clandestine in style". The effort rented office space in Alexandria, Virginia, which had coincidentally been previously rented by the Republican presidential primary campaign of Reagan's running mate George H. W. Bush. It focused on identifying positions which the president had the authority to appoint individuals to, and created lists of prospective candidates for positions.

== Official transition ==
Reagan's transition was headed by Edwin Meese, who was named its director on the day of the election. The role of the administration of outgoing president Jimmy Carter in the transition was overseen by his White House Chief of Staff Jack Watson, who had overseen Carter's own transition four years prior.

Three senior advisors were appointed. Richard V. Allen was the senior advisor for foreign policy and defense matters, Martin Anderson was the senior advisor for domestic and economic matters, and Caspar Weinberger was the senior advisor for budget matters.

James Baker was named the deputy director of the transition, and was put in charge of White House planning (overseeing the planning of the structure and management of the Reagan administration's White House staff). Six additional deputy directors were named, Michael Deaver, Drew Lewis, Lyn Nofziger, Verne Orr, and William Timmons. Deaver acted as a liaison to Reagan and his family. Lewis acted as a liaison to the Republican National Committee, women's groups, the business community, and state and local government, and also worked to develop a program for providing policy briefings to cabinet-designees and senior staff. Nofziger, initially, was in charge a press relations, a role he had held in the campaign. Orr was in charge of administrative and budgetary matters, and also acted as a key administrator within the transition. Timmons oversaw the Reagan transition team's assessment of existing programs and policies, and collected information on departments and agencies.

Pendleton James served as the personnel recruiter in the post-election transition operation, William J. Casey oversaw a senior advisory committee during the transition. Richard Wirthlin utilized his polling skills to inform planned strategy for Reagan's administration. M. Peter McPherson acted as legal counsel to the transition. Edwin J. Gray and Darrell Trent participated in policy planning. Fred F. Fielding headed the transition's vetting and clearance process for prospective appointees. Other key members of the transition were Tom C. Korologos and William French Smith.

A number of key staffers of the transition, had previously worked for former president Richard Nixon. These included Martin Anderson, and Richard V. Allen, and Pendleton James.

Reagan's transition was particularly large. It was unprecedented by any presidential transition in size. The transition involved more than 1,000 or 1,500 people, including both volunteers and paid staff. The transition involved a hundred individual transition teams for federal agencies, which, for organizational purposes, were divided into five clusters. The five clusters were economic affairs, national security, human services, resources and development, and legal-administrative. In 1987, historian Carl M. Brauer described the Reagan transition as having had the "most elaborate transition machinery" of any United States presidential transition up to that point.

The transition team worked in close partnership with conservative think tanks like the American Enterprise Institute, The Heritage Foundation, and Hoover Institution. Among the plans given to them by such organizations was the Heritage Foundation's Mandate for Leadership, a 1,000-page plan for restructuring the executive branch. The Heritage Foundation also ran a job bank providing the transition team with lists of personnel aligned with conservative ideology, and also ran a number of orientation sessions for top appointees of the incoming administration.

The transition was headquartered in Washington, D.C., in a federal office building only blocks away from the White House. In the early weeks of the transition, Reagan remained on the West Coast, meeting with a "kitchen cabinet" of advisors. However, within weeks of his election, Reagan moved into a row house in Washington, D.C., which would serve temporary quarters for him until he was sworn-in as president.

On November 20, President Carter hosted President-elect Reagan at the White House. The relationship between the outgoing and incoming president was somewhat difficult, with Carter being dismayed by what he saw as Reagan's disinterest in the important topics they discussed, as well as Reagan's lack of note-taking on the complex matters they went over. Despite this somewhat troubled relationship between Carter and Reagan, the relationship between their staffs was friendly. During that same day, incoming First Lady Nancy Reagan received a tour of the White House from outgoing First Lady Rosalynn Carter.

Reagan began announcing key appointments to his administration two week after his election victory. By the seventh week of the transition, most appointments had been announced. He had finished announcing key appointees by the tenth week of his transition.

Reagan had originally favored choosing Meese for his White House chief of staff, but some of his advisors convinced him to instead pick James Baker. During the transition, along with Meese and Michael Deaver, Baker would be part of a "troika" of top deputies to Reagan, a dynamic that would continue into the presidency. This dynamic was established shortly after the election.

Reagan waited until December 11 before beginning to name designees for his Cabinet. The first Cabinet member designees Reagan designated were largely uncontroversial, and even received praise from both the business community and the moderate wing of the Republican Party. However, several later choices he named, such as Alexander Haig for secretary of state and James G. Watt for secretary of the interior, promised to be controversial. Reagan finished naming designees for Cabinet positions on January 8, when he named Terrel Bell as his selection for secretary of education.

The transition saw Mark Anderson and David Stockman, Reagan's choice for Director of the Office of Management and Budget, shape the incoming administration's economic policy agenda.

Reagan pledged not to speak publicly on policy matters until his inauguration. However, many of his advisers spoke publicly about issues, often creating problems where the transition's press secretary James Brady would have to disavow their statements. There were unofficial statements and news leaks made by members of Reagan's administration that attracted criticism from the Carter administration's State Department.

While many aspects of the transition period operated smoothly, there were hiccups. There was controversy surrounding involvement of Jackie Presser in the transition. The Carter administration alleged that some staffers of the transition had possible conflicts of interest. There was also public speculation over the degree to which Reagan was involved in his own transition. Many scholars have, retrospectively, considered the Reagan transition as to have been a successfully managed presidential transition.

=== Finances ===
As per legislation passed in 1976, the federal government gave $3 million to fund the transition, with $2 million going to the president-elect and $1 million going to the outgoing president. The outgoing administration of Jimmy Carter spent $861,526 of the $1 million it was allotted by the federal government, with the team of the outgoing president utilizing $672,659 and the team of the outgoing vice president, Walter Mondale, utilizing $188,867. The Reagan team spent $1.75 million of the federal money granted to it. Of this amount, $63,378 went to Vice President-elect George H. W. Bush for personal compensation and benefits.

The Government Accountability Office would find that, in their use of government funds, the Reagan transition team did not always follow correct procedures. For instance, they gave salary to employees of federal agencies who had been assigned to the transition effort on a non-reimbursable basis.

The Reagan transition team also raised private contributions to further fund the transition, soliciting contributions through the private corporation Presidential Transition Foundation, Inc. They raised approximately $1.25 million. The foundation would later deny requests by the Government Accountability Office to audit these funds. Neither the funding sources nor the expenditures made with these funds have ever been disclosed to the public.

Congressional testimony would later reveal that some of the Reagan transition spending had gone to hotel bills, payments to Nancy Reagan's decorator, tuxedo rental, parties, and parking tickets.

Reagan's transition was, ultimately, more expensive than any previous transition.

=== Iran hostage crisis ===
During the transition, the Carter administration continued work on resolving the Iran hostage crisis. Negotiations were completed with the signing of the Algiers Accords on January 19, 1981, and the hostages were released on January 20, 1981, minutes after Reagan completed his 20‑minute inaugural address after being sworn-in.

== Retrospective analysis of transition ==
Laurin L. Henry, an expert on United States presidential transitions, gave retrospective high regard to the transition. In his book Presidential Transitions: From Politics to Practice, political scientist John P. Burke described the Reagan transition as having been highly organized.

== See also ==
- Ronald Reagan 1980 presidential campaign
- First inauguration of Ronald Reagan
