= Ohio Deposit Guarantee Fund =

The Ohio Deposit Guarantee Fund (1956 – 1985) was a privately owned deposit insurer for savings associations chartered in the state of Ohio. It was founded in 1956. It failed in March 1985 after its reserves were wiped out by the failure of one of its insured institutions.

The proximate cause was the fraud-related failure of ESM Securities, a securities firm, which caused 145 million dollars in losses at Ohio-chartered Home State Savings Bank. The Fund became insolvent covering the failed bank's depositors' losses. Ohio depositors, upon hearing of the Fund's insolvency, then also began to withdraw money from other savings and loan institutions across the state, triggering a small financial panic.

== Bibliography ==
- Alexander, Ronald (1981). "The Ohio Deposit Guarantee Fund: the Ohio alternative to FSLIC". Akron Law Review. 15: 431ff.
- DeGennaro, Ramon P; Thomson, James B (1995). "Anticipating bailouts: The incentive-conflict model and the collapse of the Ohio deposit guarantee fund" (PDF). Journal of Banking & Finance. 19 (8): 1401–1418. doi:10.1016/0378-4266(94)00114-I. ISSN 0378-4266.
- Kane, Edward J (February 1989). "How incentive-incompatible deposit-insurance funds fail" (PDF). National Bureau of Economic Research. NBER working paper 2836.
