= M. Danny Wall =

Chairman of the Federal Home Loan Bank Board, 1987–89

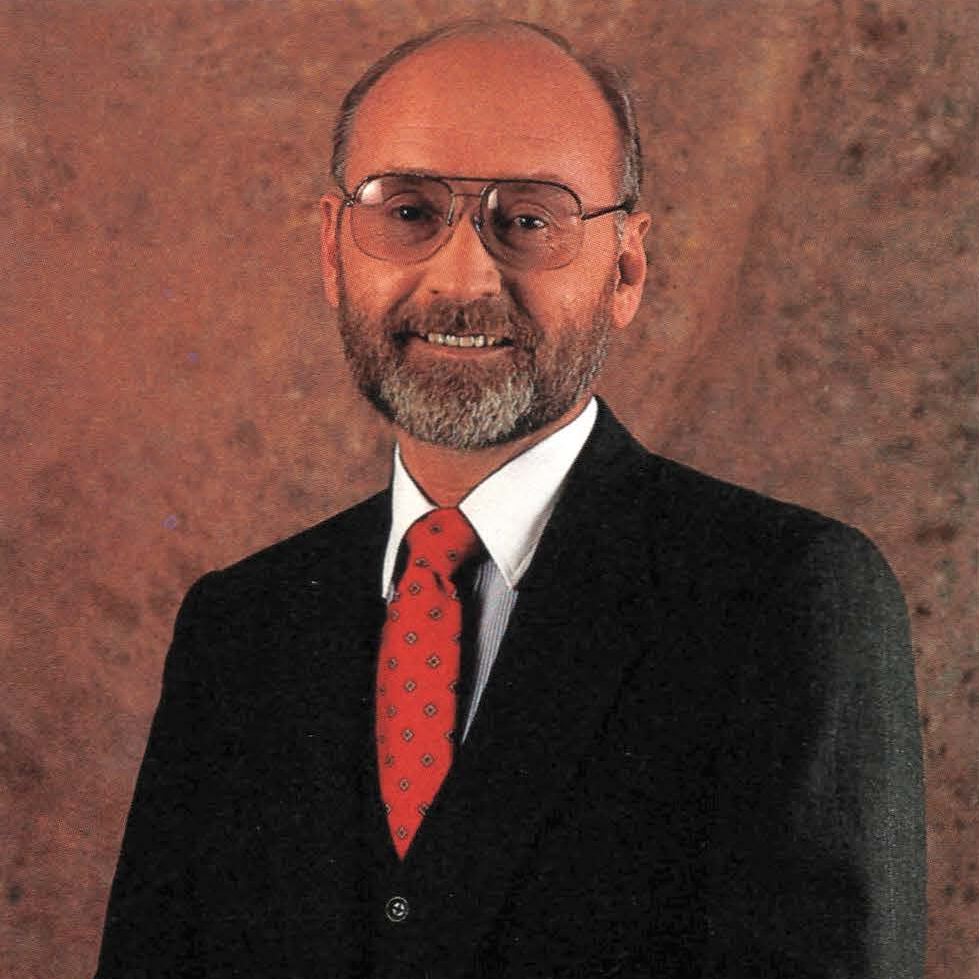
- Portrait in FHLBB 1987 Annual Report

Chairman of the Federal Home Loan Bank Board
- In office July 1, 1987 – August 9, 1989
- President: Ronald Reagan; George H. W. Bush
- Succeeded by: FHLBB abolished by FIRREA

Director of the Office of Thrift Supervision
- In office August 9, 1989 – December 5, 1989
- President: George H. W. Bush
- Preceded by: OTS created, directorship inherited by FHLBB chairman
- Succeeded by: Salvatore R. Martoche (acting)

Personal details
- Born: August 30, 1939 (age 86) Watertown, MD
- Education: North Dakota State University (BA Architecture, 1963)

M. Danny Wall (born August 30, 1939) is an American civil servant who served as the chairman of the Federal Home Loan Bank Board (FHLBB), the federal regulator for savings and loan associations. After FHLBB's abolition by the Financial Institutions Reform, Recovery, and Enforcement Act of 1989 (FIRREA), he became the first director of the Office of Thrift Supervision.

He assumed the FHLBB chairmanship on July 1, 1989, after appointment by Ronald Reagan, in place of Edwin J. Gray, whose term expired. Prior to his appointment, he had been on the staff of the Senate Committee on Banking, Housing, and Urban Affairs. He led FHLBB during the savings and loan crisis. The passage of FIRREA on August 9, 1989, saw him automatically become the directorship of the Office of Thrift Supervision, the successor regulatory agency to FHLBB. He had no background in finance and, due to his consistently over-optimistic characterisation of the crisis, lost credibility with Congress. Amid criticism for prior failure to rein in unsafe savings and loan business practices, he resigned on December 5, 1989.
