= Home State Savings Bank =

- Type: Savings and loan association
- Industry: Financial services
- Founded: Bought in 1958
- Defunct: 1985
- Fate: Failed due to fraud
- Headquarters: Cincinnati, Ohio, United States
- Area served: Ohio
- Key people: Marvin L. Warner
- Products: Banking services

Home State Savings Bank was an American savings and loan association based in Cincinnati, Ohio. Its failure in March 1985 led to a bank holiday for 70 other savings institutions that were insured by the Ohio Deposit Guarantee Fund, a private organization. The collapse of Home State Savings Bank drained Ohio’s private savings and loan insurance fund, and caused then Governor Richard Celeste to close 69 thrifts.

== History ==
=== Before the collapse ===
Home State Savings Bank was the largest savings institution in Ohio, with $1.4 billion in assets. It was owned by Marvin L. Warner, a local real estate developer and investor. He bought the bank in 1958. Warner had been a part owner of the New York Yankees and the Tampa Bay Buccaneers in the 1970s, and was the original owner of the United States Football League Birmingham Stallions. Warner was also a substantial political donor, and had been appointed as the United States ambassador to Switzerland in 1977 by President Jimmy Carter.

=== Downfall ===
ESM Government Securities, Inc. of Fort Lauderdale, Florida, was a securities brokerage firm specializing in term repurchase agreements and reverse repurchase agreements. The company was shut down by the Securities and Exchange Commission on March 4, 1985. The company had incurred large losses and had pledged collateral to more than one lender.

Home State Savings Bank was doing substantial business with ESM. After ESM failed, it was revealed that Home State would suffer a loss of about $150 million from their transactions with ESM. A run on the bank ensued with over $100 million withdrawn in a few days. The bank was closed on March 9, 1985. Bank runs ensued on other institutions insured by the Ohio Deposit Guarantee Fund after it was revealed that the fund had insufficient funds to pay off Home State depositors.

On March 15, 1985, Ohio Governor Dick Celeste declared a three-day banking holiday for the 70 other savings institutions covered by the Ohio Deposit Guarantee Fund. They were then told to remain closed until they obtained federal deposit insurance from the Federal Savings and Loan Insurance Corporation or Federal Deposit Insurance Corporation, or until they merged.

=== Aftermath ===
Home State Savings Bank was sold on May 29, 1985, to Hunter Savings Association, a part of American Financial Group, and the bank reopened on June 14, 1985. All but one of the other savings institutions covered by the Ohio Deposit Guarantee Fund either merged or obtained federal deposit insurance.

Public confidence declined in financial institutions insured by other state guaranty funds. In May 1985, Maryland suffered a similar run on state-insured savings institutions after it was revealed that Old Court Savings and Loans and Merritt Commercial Savings and Loan were having financial problems.

Marvin Warner was convicted in March 1987 of nine counts of fraud-related charges relating to Home State Savings Bank and served 28 months in prison. He then moved to a 150-acre horse farm in Ocala, Florida, taking advantage of the homestead exemption in Florida, and died in 2002. Two of the former presidents of the bank, David Schiebel and Burton Bongard, were also convicted.

Warner's son-in-law Stephen Arky committed suicide in July 1985. Arky's law firm had represented ESM, and Arky had done personal financial transactions with ESM.

The failure of ESM (along with the failures of other government securities brokerage firms like Drysdale Government Securities, Lombard-Wall, Lion Capital Group, Bevill Bresler and Schulman, and RTD Securities) led to the enactment of the Government Securities Act of 1986.

== See also ==
- Old Court Savings and Loans
- Savings and loan crisis

== Sources ==
- Home State Savings collapse: How failure changed protection of your money; Channel 12; YouTube"Home State Savings collapse: How failure changed protection of your money"
- The Crisis: Fifteen Days That Shook Cincinnati; Cincinnati Magazine May 1985 Cincinnati Magazine
- Home State Savings Litigation; Cincinnati Magazine Aug 2001 Cincinnati Magazine
- Keiger, Dale (September 1986) "The Man Who Would Be Somebody." Cincinnati Magazine
- Horstman, Barry M. (December 27, 1999) "Marvin Warner: Financier's fall affected thousands". The Cincinnati Post
- Horstman, Barry M. (April 12, 2002) "Banking scandal's Warner, 82, dies". The Cincinnati Post
