= ESM Government Securities =

ESM Government Securities, Inc.
- Founded: 1975; 51 years ago
- Founder: Ronnie Ewton; Robert Seneca; George Mead
- Defunct: March 4, 1985; 40 years ago
- Fate: Shut down by Securities and Exchange Commission; Multiple employees imprisoned
- Headquarters: Fort Lauderdale, Florida, U.S.
- Services: Government securities dealing

ESM Government Securities, Inc. was a Fort Lauderdale, Florida-based government securities dealer, specializing in repurchase agreements and reverse repurchase agreements. The failure of the company in March 1985 precipitated the collapse of Home State Savings Bank, deposit runs on dozens of other banks in Ohio, and the downfall of the private Ohio Deposit Guarantee Fund.

== History ==
ESM was started in 1975 by Ronnie Ewton, Robert Seneca and George Mead, taking the name of the company from the first letter of their last names. (Seneca resigned from the company in 1978.) Alan Novick joined soon afterwards and would later become president (but died in November 1984 of a heart attack). Stephen Arky, an attorney, met Ronnie Ewton in his National Guard unit, and introduced him to his father-in-law Marvin Warner, the owner of Home State Savings Bank in Cincinnati, Ohio.

=== Fraud shutdown ===
ESM was shut down on March 4, 1985, by the Securities and Exchange Commission and placed into receivership after massive fraud was discovered. ESM had suffered large operating losses and had pledged the same collateral to more than one lender, with initial estimated losses of over $300 million.

==== Impact on Home State Savings Bank ====
Home State Savings Bank was the biggest customer of ESM and it was revealed that Home State would suffer a loss of about $150 million from their transactions with ESM. A run on the bank ensued with over $100 million withdrawn in a few days. The bank was closed on March 9, 1985. Bank runs ensued on other institutions insured by the Ohio Deposit Guarantee Fund after it was revealed that the fund had insufficient funds to pay off Home State depositors. A bank holiday was declared by the governor of Ohio for those banks covered by the Fund. Other major victims of ESM included the cities of Beaumont, Texas; Toledo, Ohio; Pompano Beach, Florida; Clark County, Nevada; Clallam County, Washington; and American Savings & Loan of Miami, Florida.

==== Legal proceedings and legislative response ====
An investigation showed that Jose Gomez, a partner in the Certified Public Accountant firm of Alexander Grant & Company, was given bribes to falsify the financial statements. Seven people involved with ESM pleaded guilty in April 1986, including Ronnie Ewton, George Mead, four other executives of the firm, and Jose Gomez. Ewton received 15 years in prison, Mead received 14 years, and Gomez received 12 years. Stephen Arky committed suicide in July 1985. Henry Earl Riddel, the company's controller, committed suicide in November 1986. Marvin Warner was convicted in March 1987 of nine counts of fraud-related charges relating to Home State Savings Bank and served 28 months in prison. Alexander Grant & Co. paid out $173 million in damages and legal fees.

The United States Congress enacted the Government Securities Act of 1986 in response to the failure of ESM and other similar government dealer failures and scandals.
