= Edwin J. Gray =

American politician

Edwin J. Gray is an American politician and businessman who served as the chair of the Federal Home Loan Bank Board in the 1980s.

== Early life ==
Gray was born in 1933 or 1934. Per the resume he published in the 1980s, Gray was the valedictorian of his high school graduating class in 1953.

== Early career ==
Gray was, for many years, a political aide to Ronald Reagan. His work with Reagan began in 1966, when he was part of the press team for Reagan's first gubernatorial inauguration. He thereafter worked for Reagan during his governorship, before leaving to work as a savings and loan executive.

During Reagan's 1980 presidential campaign, Gray served first as Reagan's press secretary for a four month period, and later as deputy chief of staff for the Reagan-Bush Committee. During the presidential transition of Ronald Reagan, Gray participated in policy planning. On January 16, 1981, President-elect Reagan named Gray to serve in his administration as "deputy assistant to the president for policy development". By the end of his tenure in the White House, he was serving as director of the White House Office of Policy Information. While working in the Reagan White House, he helped to convinced the Reagan administration to support the Depository Institutions Act of 1982. He left the Reagan White House in August 1982 to accept a job a Great American Federal Savings Bank.

== Federal Home Loan Bank Board ==
In February 1983, Reagan nominated Gray to serve as a member of the Federal Home Loan Bank Board, both for a partial term expiring June 30, 1983 and a full term after that, expiring June 30, 1987. He was confirmed by the United States Senate by unanimous consent on March 23, 1983.

In 1984, Gray became chair of the Federal Home Loan Bank Board. He was the twentieth individual to hold this position. He had been originally perceived as a friend to the savings and loans industry, which had pushed for him to be placed in that position.

Gray sounded the alarms in 1984 that there was trouble in the savings and loan industry, forewarning the coming savings and loan crisis. United States Secretary of the Treasury Donald Regan did not heed Gray's warnings.

Beginning in 1985, he feared that the savings industry's risky investment practices were exposing the government's insurance funds to huge losses. Gray instituted a rule whereby savings associations could hold no more than ten percent of their assets in "direct investments", and were thus prohibited from taking ownership positions in certain financial entities and instruments.

As chairman, the strict regulations he put in place made him controversial. In 1985, Donald Regan, by then White House Chief of Staff made an effort to push Gray out of the job.

Gray butted heads with Charles Keating, the chairman of Lincoln Savings and Loan Association, who tried to get Gray to quit the board by offering him a position at the bank. Intervention on behalf of Keating by five members of the United States Senate at an April 1987 meeting with Gray would be at the center of the Keating Five controversy.

Gray's tenure ended in mid-1987.

== Later career ==
Gray worked at Chase Federal Bank. He departed in the fall of 1993.

In 1988, when Speaker of the U.S. House of Representatives Jim Wright was under investigation by the House Ethics Committee, Gray provided the Wall Street Journal with information about Wright's attempts to interfere with investigations that the Federal Home Loan Bank Board had been undertaking during Gray's tenure as its chairman. These news stories helped to solidify end of Wright's political career.
