= Federal takeover of Fannie Mae and Freddie Mac =

Action by the U.S. Treasury to lessen the subprime mortgage crisis

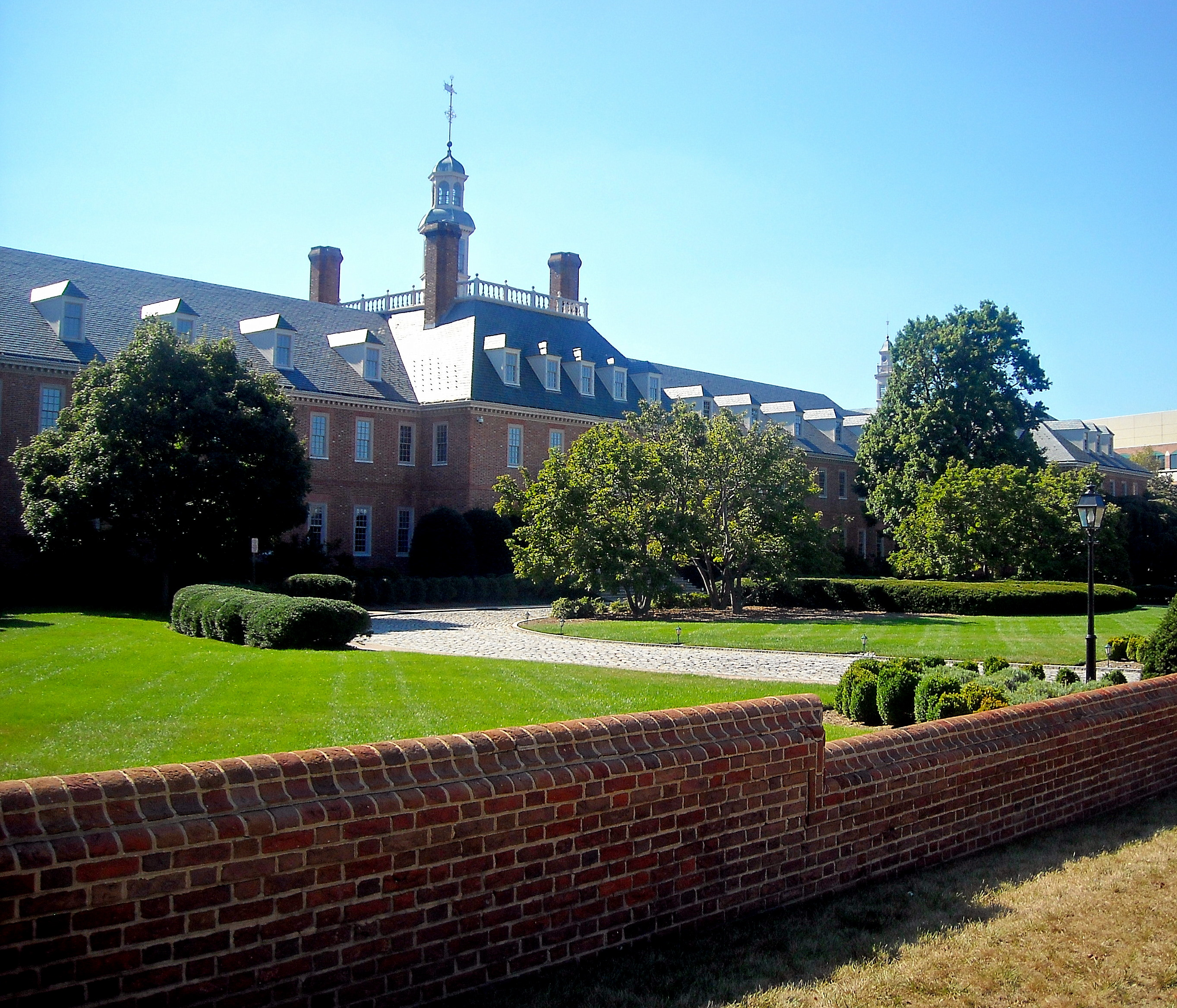
Fannie Mae's former headquarters at 3900 Wisconsin Avenue, NW in Washington, D.C.

In September 2008, the Federal Housing Finance Agency (FHFA) announced that it would take over the Federal National Mortgage Association (Fannie Mae) and the Federal Home Loan Mortgage Corporation (Freddie Mac). Both government-sponsored enterprises, which finance home mortgages in the United States by issuing bonds, had become illiquid as the market for those bonds collapsed in the subprime mortgage crisis. The FHFA established conservatorships in which each enterprise's management works under the FHFA's direction to reduce losses and to develop a new operating structure that will allow a return to self-management.

As of 2024, Fannie Mae and Freddie Mac remain under conservatorship, and after more than repaying their Treasury loans are building capital reserves for an expected eventual exit.

== Background and financial market crisis ==
The combined GSE losses of US$14.9 billion and market concerns about their ability to raise capital and debt threatened to disrupt the U.S. housing financial market. The Treasury committed to investing as much as US$200 billion in preferred stock and extend credit through 2009 to keep the GSEs solvent and operating. The two GSEs had outstanding more than US$5 trillion in mortgage-backed securities (MBS) and debt; the debt portion alone was $1.6 trillion. The conservatorship action has been described as "one of the most sweeping government interventions in private financial markets in decades" and one that "could turn into the biggest and costliest government bailout ever of private companies".

With a growing sense of crisis in U.S. financial markets, the conservatorship action and commitment by the U.S. government to backstop the two GSEs with up to US$200 billion in additional capital turned out to be the first significant event in a tumultuous month among U.S.-based investment banking, financial institutions, and federal regulatory bodies. By September 15, 2008, the 158-year-old Lehman Brothers holding company filed for bankruptcy with the intent to liquidate its assets, leaving its financially sound subsidiaries operational and outside of the bankruptcy filing. The collapse was the largest investment bank failure since Drexel Burnham Lambert in 1990. The 94-year-old Merrill Lynch accepted a purchase offer by Bank of America for approximately US$50 billion, a big drop from a year-earlier market valuation of about US$100 billion. A credit rating downgrade of the large insurer American International Group (AIG) led to a September 16, 2008 rescue agreement with the Federal Reserve Bank for a US$85 billion secured loan facility, in exchange for warrants for 79.9% of the equity of AIG.

== Previous attempts at GSE reform ==
In 2003, the Bush Administration sought to create a new agency, replacing the Office of Federal Housing Enterprise Oversight, to oversee Fannie Mae and Freddie Mac. In 1992, in the wake of the savings and loan crisis, and over concern that similar lending problems would develop, the Office of Federal Housing Enterprise Oversight was created as part of the Department of Housing and Urban Development. While Senate and House leaders voiced their intention to bring about the needed legislation, no reform bills materialized. A Senate reform bill introduced by Senator Jon Corzine (D-NJ) (S.1656) never made it out of the 21-member (10 D, 11 R) Senate Banking, Housing, and Urban Affairs Committee. At the time, some members of the 108th Congress expressed faith in the solvency of Fannie Mae and Freddie Mac. Congressman Barney Frank (D-MA), for example, described them as "not facing any kind of financial crisis".

In 2005, the Federal Housing Enterprise Regulatory Reform Act, sponsored by Senator Chuck Hagel (R-NE) and co-sponsored by Senators Elizabeth Dole (R-NC), John McCain (R-AZ) and John Sununu (R-NH), would have increased government oversight of loans given by Fannie Mae and Freddie Mac. Like the 2003 bill, it also died in the Senate Banking, Housing, and Urban Affairs Committee, this time in the 109th Congress. A full and accurate record of the congressional attempts to regulate the housing GSEs is given in the Congressional Record prepared in 2005.

== Federal Housing Finance Agency and Treasury authority ==
The Housing and Economic Recovery Act of 2008—passed by the United States Congress on July 24, 2008, with bipartisan support and signed into law by President George W. Bush on July 30, 2008—enabled expanded regulatory authority over Fannie Mae and Freddie Mac by the newly established FHFA, and gave the U.S. Treasury the authority to advance funds for the purpose of stabilizing Fannie Mae, or Freddie Mac, limited only by the amount of debt that the entire federal government is permitted by law to commit to. The law raised the Treasury's debt ceiling by US$800 billion, to a total of US$10.7 trillion, in anticipation of the potential need for the Treasury to have the flexibility to support Fannie Mae, Freddie Mac, or the Federal Home Loan Banks.

=== Prior GSE support measures ===
The September 7 conservatorship was termed by The Economist as the "second" bailout of the GSEs. Prior to the enactment of the Housing and Economic Recovery Act of 2008, on July 13, 2008, Treasury Secretary Henry Paulson announced an effort to backstop the GSEs based on prior statutory authority, in coordination with the Federal Reserve Bank. That announcement occurred after a week in which the market values of shares of Fannie Mae and Freddie Mac fell almost by half (from a previously diminished value of approximately half of year-earlier market highs). That plan contained three measures: an increase in the line of credit available to the GSEs from the Treasury to provide liquidity; the right for the Treasury to purchase equity in the GSEs, to provide capital; and a consultative role for the Federal Reserve in a reformed GSE regulatory system. On the same day, the Federal Reserve announced that the Federal Reserve Bank of New York would have the right to lend to the GSEs as necessary.

== Capital infusion by the Treasury ==
The agreement the Treasury made with both GSEs specifies that in exchange for future support and capital investments of up to US$100 billion in each GSE, at the inception of the conservatorship, each GSE shall issue to the Treasury US$1 billion of senior preferred stock, with a 10% coupon, without cost to the Treasury. Also, each GSE contracted to issue common stock warrants representing an ownership stake of 79.9%, at an exercise price of one-thousandth of a U.S. cent ($0.00001) per share, and with a warrant duration of twenty years.

The conservator, FHFA, signed the agreements on behalf of the GSEs. The $100 billion amount for each GSE was chosen to indicate the level of commitment that the U.S. Treasury is willing to make to keep the financial operations and financial conditions solvent and sustainable for both GSEs. The agreements were designed to protect the senior and subordinate debt and the mortgage-backed securities of the GSEs. The GSEs' common stock and existing preferred shareholders will bear any losses ahead of the government. Among other conditions of the agreement, each GSE's retained mortgage and mortgage backed securities portfolio shall not exceed $850 billion as of December 31, 2009, and shall decline by 10% per year until it reaches $250 billion.

== FHFA initial actions as conservator ==
In the September 6, 2008 conservatorship announcement, Lockhart indicated the following items in the plan of action for the Federal Housing Finance Agency conservatorship:

1. On September 8, 2008, the first business day of the conservatorship, business will be transacted normally, with stronger backing for the holders of mortgage-backed securities (MBS), senior debt and subordinated debt.
2. The Enterprises will be allowed to grow their guarantee MBS books without limits and continue to purchase replacement securities for their portfolios, about $20 billion per month, without capital constraints.
3. As the conservator, the FHFA will assume the power of the Board and management.
4. The present Chief Executive Officers (CEOs) of both Fannie Mae and Freddie Mac have been dismissed but will stay on to help with the transition.
5. Appointed as CEOs are Herbert M. Allison for Fannie Mae and David M. Moffett for Freddie Mac. Allison is a former vice chairman of Merrill Lynch and, for the last eight years, chairman of TIAA-CREF. Moffett is the former vice chairman and CFO of US Bancorp. Their compensation will be significantly lower than the outgoing CEOs. They will be joined by equally strong non-executive chairmen.
6. Other management actions will be very limited. The new CEOs agreed it was important to work with the current management teams and employees to encourage them to stay and to continue to make important improvements to the Enterprises.
7. To conserve over $2 billion annually in capital, the common stock and preferred stock dividends will be eliminated, but the common and all preferred stocks will remain outstanding. Subordinated debt interest and principal payments will continue to be made.
8. All political activities, including all lobbying, will be halted immediately. Charitable activities will be reviewed.
9. There will be a financing and investment relationship with the U.S. Treasury via three different financing facilities to provide critically needed support to Freddie Mac and Fannie Mae and also to the liquidity of the mortgage market. One of the three facilities is a secured liquidity facility, which will be not only for Fannie Mae and Freddie Mac, but also for the 12 Federal Home Loan Banks that are regulated by FHFA.

== Government support for Fannie Mae and Freddie Mac ==
In addition to the government conservatorship, which CBO estimates will increase the federal government's net liabilities by $238 billion, several government agencies have taken steps to increase liquidity within Fannie Mae and Freddie Mac. Among these steps includes:

1. Federal Reserve purchases of $23 billion in GSE debt (out of a potential $100 billion) and $53 billion in GSE-held mortgage backed securities (out of a potential $500 billion).
2. The Federal Reserve purchases of $24 billion in GSE debt.
3. Treasury Department purchases of $14 billion in GSE stock (out of a potential $200 billion).
4. Treasury Department purchases of $71 billion in mortgage backed securities
5. Federal Reserve extension of primary credit rate for loans to the GSEs

=== National debt accounting ===
The on- or off-balance sheet obligations of the two GSEs, which are "independent" corporations rather than federal agencies, are just over $5 trillion, a significant amount when compared to the $9.5 trillion of officially reported United States public debt at the time of the takeover. The September 6, 2008 conservatorship and the subsequent planned Treasury infusion of capital support the senior liabilities, subordinated indebtedness, and mortgage guarantees of the two firms. Some observers see this as an effective nationalization of the companies that ultimately places taxpayers at risk for all their liabilities. The federal government follows specialized accounting standards set by the Federal Accounting Standards Advisory Board. The net exposure to taxpayers is difficult to determine at the time of the takeover and depends on several factors, such as declines in housing prices and losses on mortgage assets in the future. The Congressional Budget Office director, Peter R. Orszag announced on September 9, 2008, that the CBO intended to incorporate the assets and liabilities of the two companies into their federal budget planning due to the degree of government control over the entities. On September 12, 2008, White House Budget Director Jim Nussle indicated their budget plans would not incorporate the GSE debt into the budget because of the temporary nature of the conservator intervention.

Bloomberg reported that according to CMA Datavision of London, "five-year credit-default swap contracts on U.S. government debt increased 3.5 basis points on September 9, 2008 to a record 18, up from 6 basis points in April," in reaction to concerns about the potential rise in U.S. debt from bailouts.

=== Related legislation ===
On May 8, 2013, Representatives Scott Garrett introduced the Budget and Accounting Transparency Act of 2014 (H.R. 1872; 113th Congress) into the United States House of Representatives during the 113th United States Congress. The bill, if it were passed, would modify the budgetary treatment of federal credit programs, such as Fannie Mae and Freddie Mac. The bill would require that the cost of direct loans or loan guarantees be recognized in the federal budget on a fair-value basis using guidelines set forth by the Financial Accounting Standards Board. The changes made by the bill would mean that Fannie Mae and Freddie Mac were counted on the budget instead of considered separately and would mean that the debt of those two programs would be included in the national debt. These programs themselves would not be changed, but how they are accounted for in the United States federal budget would be. The goal of the bill is to improve the accuracy of how some programs are accounted for in the federal budget.

== Market consequences ==
=== Bank reserves ===
Many commercial banks in the United States own Freddie and Fannie preferred shares. Those shares have had their dividends suspended and are junior to the senior preferred stock issued to the Treasury in the restructuring of the two companies. The market value of the preferred shares plunged after the restructuring announcement and suspension of dividends. Banks were required to write down the value of Freddie and Fannie preferred stock held in their portfolios, compounding capitalization concerns for certain U.S. banks. Gateway bank agreed to be bought out by Hampton Roads Bankshares Inc. to make up for a writedown of $40 million on its stock in Fannie and Freddie, which put it below regulatory requirements to be considered adequately capitalized.

=== Credit default swaps ===
In the credit default swap (CDS) market, the standard contracts typically used between parties to a swap define the action of placing Fannie Mae and Freddie Mac into conservatorship as equivalent to bankruptcy, because of the change in management control. In CDS parlance, this is termed a credit event, and that triggers the settling of outstanding contracts for the derivatives, which are used to hedge or speculate on the potential risk that a company will default on its bonds. The two GSEs have approximately US$1.5 trillion in bonds outstanding, and since the market for credit default swaps is not public, there is no central reporting mechanism to verify how many credit default swaps are linked to those bonds. One estimate floated is US$500 billion, and the entire CDS market has a nominal value in the vicinity of US$62 trillion. Settlement on the contracts will likely be the largest in the market's decade-long history. Credit-default swaps on Fannie and Freddie have been among the most actively traded in the several months leading up to the conservatorship. "Thirteen 'major' dealers of credit-default swaps agreed 'unanimously' that the rescue constitutes a credit event triggering payment or delivery of the companies' bonds," according to a memo circulated by the International Swaps and Derivatives Association (ISDA) after the conservatorship announcement. The day after the conservatorship announcement, the International Swaps and Derivatives Association, which sets industry standardized contracts for financial derivatives and swaps, announced it was working on a protocol on how to evaluate and settle Fannie Mae and Freddie Mac credit default swaps. Most of these swaps were settled on October 6, 2008.

Paradoxically (in relation to typical experiences when a company issuing bonds has a "credit event"), the value of the two GSE bonds rose to the vicinity of par value after the conservatorship. This means that some owners of swaps that were hedging against the risk of a bond default may be worse off, since the value of the bonds may be higher than when they purchased the swap. Cash auctions were reported to be scheduled for October 2008 to settle CDS contracts in relation to the GSEs.

=== September 2008 reactions to the seizure ===
The immediate reactions in the finance markets on Monday, September 8, the day following the seizure, appeared to indicate satisfaction with at least the short-term implications of the Treasury's intervention. The Governor of the Bank of Japan Masaaki Shirakawa stated, "We expect the action to stabilize the U.S. [mortgage-backed securities] market, the financial market, and the international financial market." Governor of the People's Bank of China, China's central bank, Zhou Xiaochuan stated, "From my point of view, this is positive".

== Effects on the subprime mortgage crisis ==
The government's intervention during the subprime mortgage crisis was intended to support the soundness of the obligations and guarantees on securities issued by Fannie and Freddie to obtain funds. Those funds were in turn used to purchase mortgages from originating banks. The anticipated soundness of GSE obligations was expected to enhance market liquidity (loanable funds) in the following ways:

- Banks could be assured that Fannie and Freddie had funds to purchase conforming loans, encouraging them to increase such lending. This was intended to improve liquidity in the mortgage market and lower interest rates.
- In 2006, Fannie and Freddie insured 70% of all subprime loans so they needed to keep these loans viable.
- Lower borrowing costs for banks typically increased the "spread" between the rate at which they borrowed and lent. This aimed to increase bank profitability, further shoring up bank liquidity and balance sheets.
- Adjustable rate mortgage (ARM) rates would be reduced, which was intended to lower pressure on homeowners and reduce foreclosures, while lower rates would also encourage new home purchases.
- The government's role as the primary investor allowed a systematic loan refinancing process to be implemented. This was projected to enable rapid loan adjustments or workouts for homeowners, who had been facing bottlenecks due to the requirement to have various investors approve the adjustments. For example, the government could rapidly push-down 45-year mortgage terms and fixed, low interest rates, enabling many more homeowners to stay in their homes. This was expected to reduce foreclosures significantly, helping to stabilize home prices.
- The government could restructure mortgages so that the loan balance was reduced to the current market value, reducing the incentive for homeowners to "walk away" from the property.
- With home prices more stabilized, the value of mortgage-backed securities was expected to receive some upward support.

== Financial condition of Fannie and Freddie prior to takeover ==
Over 98% of Fannie's loans were paid on time in 2008. Both Fannie and Freddie had positive net worth as of the date of the takeover, meaning the value of their assets exceeded their liabilities. However, Fannie's total assets to capital (leverage ratio) was about 20:1, while Freddie's was about 70:1. These numbers increase significantly if one includes all the mortgage-backed assets they guarantee. These ratios are considerably higher than investment banks, which leverage around 30:1.

However, there was concern that the GSEs' liquidity was insufficient to handle growing delinquency rates, such that although viable in September 2008, the scale of loss in the future would be sufficient that insolvency would occur and that knowledge of this future failure would induce immediate or near-immediate failure due to buyers refusing to buy debt. Both GSEs roll over large amounts of debt on a quarterly basis, and failure to sell debt would lead to failure due to lack of liquidity. A slower form of failure would be the issuing of debt at high cost (to compensate buyers for risk), which would greatly diminish the earning power of both GSEs, rendering them unable to earn the money they would need to handle expected future losses. Both GSEs counted large amounts of deferred tax assets towards their regulatory capital, which were considered by some to be of "low quality" and not truly available capital. The deferred tax assets would only have value if the companies were profitable and could use the assets to offset future taxes. Both companies had experienced significant losses and were likely to face more over the next year or longer.

== Ongoing status of Fannie and Freddie conservatorship ==
In testimony before a House Financial Services Committee subcommittee on June 3, 2009, Federal Housing Finance Agency Director James B. Lockhart III presented his report, "The Present Condition and Future Status of Fannie Mae and Freddie Mac.". Highlights of the report include: the Treasury Department's commitment to fund up to $200 billion in capital for each enterprise is expected to be sufficient; the enterprises own or guarantee 56% of the single family mortgages in the United States, or $5.4 trillion of the total $11.9 trillion in outstanding mortgage debt; their combined share of mortgages originated in the first quarter of 2009 was 73%; private-label mortgage-backed securities (PLS) are a major driver of enterprise losses; both Enterprises are heavily involved in planning and implementing the Making Home Affordable and the Home Affordable Refinance programs. The report notes:

As of March 31, 2009, seriously delinquent loans accounted for 2.3% of single-family mortgages owned or guaranteed for Freddie Mac and 3.2% for Fannie Mae. While those are historically high levels, they compare favorably to industry averages of 4.7% for all prime loans, 7.2% for all single-family mortgages, 24.9% for all subprime mortgages, and 36.5% for subprime adjustable rate mortgages

The report provides background on the origins of PLS and the risks they present. PLS loans represent 15% of mortgages but 50% of serious delinquencies. In contrast, at year-end 2008, the loans the enterprises held or guaranteed represented 56% of the U.S. single-family mortgages outstanding, but 20% of serious delinquencies. The credit quality of investments in PLS has proven to be much worse than the initial AAA credit ratings of those securities would have suggested. The ongoing uncertainty surrounding the true economic value of PLS will continue to raise safety and soundness concerns.

The report notes the for-profit structure of the GSEs worked counter to prudent risk management as competition reduced both market share and profits, thus eroding the GSEs credit requirements. To maintain profitability, each enterprise increased purchases of PLS backed by alternative mortgages and of high-risk whole loans. And while many had criticized the OFHEO and sought to replace it:

Purchases of PLS ultimately proved disastrous for the Enterprises. Credit and market-value losses would have been even larger had the Office of Federal Housing Enterprise Oversight (OFHEO), one of FHFA's predecessor agencies, not increased the Enterprises' capital requirement by 30% and capped their asset portfolios because of accounting and control problems.

The George W. Bush administration was prevented from taking official action due to Senate Bill 190 of the 109th Congress never being allowed a full Senate vote, even though it was passed out of committee on a 13-9 vote along party lines (13 Republicans voted "yes" and 9 Democrats voted "no"). Doing so would have prevented Congress' home ownership goals from being realized. On June 16, 2010, it was announced that the two GSEs would have their shares delisted from the NYSE. An article from August 2012 in Bloomberg noted that the companies "have drawn $190 billion in aid and paid $46 billion in dividends since being taken over by U.S. regulators in 2008". CBS News reported on August 6, 2015, that Fannie Mae alone has paid a total of $142.5 billion in dividends since receiving a bailout of $116 billion in 2008. On September 24, 2012, a judge dismissed a class-action lawsuit that contended that Freddie Mac made misleading statements about its exposure to risky loans in the run-up to the company's federal takeover. As of 2018, profits from Fannie Mae and Freddie Mac are still being sent to the Treasury Department.

Shareholders of Fannie Mae and Freddie Mac have challenged the net worth profit taking by the government, in part by challenging the structure of the FHFA. They argued that the FHFA, as established by Congress, has a director that can only be removed "for cause" and not "at will.". The Fifth Circuit Court of Appeals sided with the shareholders both on its initial hearing and in an en banc review. Both sides of the case petitioned the Supreme Court to review the case; during this time, the Court ruled in Seila Law LLC v. Consumer Financial Protection Bureau, 591 U.S. ___ (2020), that the Consumer Financial Protection Bureau, another Congress-established agency with a director that could only be removed "for cause," was unconstitutional. Subsequently, the Court certified the petition for the FHFA case to review its structure as well as determine if the profit-taking decision and other orders should be reversed should the director position be considered unconstitutional. The Court heard oral arguments to this case on December 9, 2020. In 2021 in a 7-2 decision, the Court held that the structure of the FHFA was unconstitutional, but remanded the case to lower courts to determine the proper remedy.

== See also ==
- Government policies and the subprime mortgage crisis
- Subprime mortgage crisis
- 2000s United States housing bubble
- Conservatorship
- Nationalization
