= Renasant Bank =

Regional bank based in Tupelo, Mississippi

Renasant Corporation
- Company type: Public
- Traded as: NYSE: DLB
- Industry: Finance and insurance; Securities
- Founded: 1904; 122 years ago
- Headquarters: Tupelo, Mississippi, U.S.
- Key people: Kevin Chapman (CEO)
- Products: Financial services
- Revenue: ▼US$1.091 billion (2024)
- Net income: ▲US$195.4 million (2024)
- Total assets: ▲US$18.035 billion (2024)
- Total equity: ▲US$2.678 billion (2024)
- Number of employees: 3,200
- Website: renasantbank.com

Renasant Bank is an American regional commercial financial institution based in Tupelo, Mississippi. The bank has more than 280 branches in Alabama, Florida, Georgia, Mississippi, Louisiana, Tennessee, North Carolina and South Carolina. Renasant Bank operates under the parent company Renasant Corporation and is affiliated with Renasant Nation, a platform through which they publish blogs and shows.

== History ==
Renasant began as The Peoples Bank and Trust Company in 1904. Throughout the 1980s and 1990s the bank grew by acquiring small local banks in Mississippi. In 2005, it acquired Heritage Bank of Decatur, Alabama, and Renasant Bancshares of Memphis, Tennessee and assumed the new Renasant Bank moniker. In 2007, Renasant acquired Capital Bank of Nashville, Tennessee.

In 2010, as part of the financial crisis, it acquired the failed Crescent Bank and Trust of Jasper, Georgia and later the American Trust Bank of Roswell, Georgia, both suburban Atlanta banks. Additional acquisitions followed in the 2010s, Merchants and Farmers Bank of Kosciusko, Mississippi in 2013, Heritage Bank of the South in Albany, Georgia, in 2015, and Keyworth Bank of Johns Creek, Georgia. In the third quarter of 2018, Renasant acquired BrandBank of Lawrenceville, Georgia, adding 13 more locations.

In early 2025, Renasant acquired The First Bancshares, Inc., the parent company of The First Bank, headquartered in Hattiesburg, Mississippi, which added more than $8 billion in assets, 111 locations and introduced the company into the state of Louisiana.

== Services offered ==
Renasant Bank offers checking and savings accounts, credit cards, wealth management, and digital banking services. It also offers conforming, FHA, Jumbo, VA, and USDA mortgages as well as HELOCs. For businesses, it offers treasury and corporate banking services.

== Asset history ==
Asset History
Year	Reported Assets
1954	$3 million
1973	$73 million
2003	$1 billion+
2007	$3.4 billion
2012	$4.2 billion
2016	$8.69 billion
2017	$9.82 billion
2018	$12.93 billion
2019	$13.40 billion
2025	$26 billion
