= Thornburg Mortgage =

U.S. real estate company

Thornburg Mortgage, Inc.
- Type: Public
- Industry: Mortgage lender
- Founded: 1993
- Defunct: April 1, 2009
- Fate: Filed for Chapter 11 bankruptcy
- Headquarters: Santa Fe, New Mexico, United States
- Area served: United States
- Key people: Garrett Thornburg, Chairman; Larry A. Goldstone, President and CEO
- Net income: ▼US$ -1.55 billion (2007)
- Total assets: ▼US$ 36.27 billion (2007)
- Number of employees: 400 (2007)

Thornburg Mortgage, Inc. was a United States real estate investment trust (REIT) that originated, acquired and managed mortgages, with a specific focus on jumbo and super jumbo adjustable rate mortgages. The company experienced financial difficulties related to the subprime mortgage crisis in 2007 and filed for bankruptcy on April 1, 2009.

It was founded in 1993 and prior to its failure it was a publicly traded corporation headquartered in Santa Fe, New Mexico. It got caught up in the 2008 financial crisis when it moved from a passive REIT to wholesale origination of mortgages in 2006.

== History ==
The company was founded in 1993 by Garrett Thornburg & Larry A. Goldstone. Thornburg Mortgage's headquarters in Santa Fe, New Mexico were built to be eco-friendly.

The company's business model was originally a conventional passive mortgage REIT, but in 1999 Thornburg Mortgage branched out to originating mortgages, working with other financial institutions (a.k.a. correspondent origination). In 2001, it started selling directly to consumers (direct retail origination) and moved into wholesale origination in 2006.

=== 2007 - Financial difficulties ===
On August 7, an analyst with Deutsche Bank downgraded Thornburg Mortgage to "Sell", based upon concerns that the company could be faced with increasing margin calls despite the high rating of its mortgage backed securities. Beginning August 9, these same securities experienced a "sudden and unprecedented" decline in value, along with an increase in margin calls. In response, during the week beginning August 13, the company stopped accepting loan applications, sold US$20.5 billion of its mortgage backed securities portfolio (in doing so incurring a capital loss of US$930 million), mitigated the potential for margin calls by reducing its repurchase borrowings and delayed payment of a previously announced stock dividend from August 15 to September 17. The company's stock price closed 47% lower when the delayed dividend payment was announced on August 14, but over the next few days regained most of those losses. A couple of weeks later the company also raised US$500 million through a preferred share offering, a move described as "a desperate attempt to stay afloat", and began accepting applications again.

=== 2008 ===
On March 7, the company announced that it would be restating its 2007 financial results, and that, as of the previous day, it had US$610 million in outstanding margin calls, a greater amount than cash available. Financial analysts speculated that the company would need to seek bankruptcy protection.

Thornburg Mortgage indicated on March 19 that it had reached an agreement with five of its creditors which stopped additional margin calls for one year but included several conditions, the most urgent of which was to raise US$948 million within seven business days. The five creditors were identified as Bear Stearns, Citigroup, Credit Suisse, Royal Bank of Scotland and UBS The company further confirmed that without the additional capital it may have to file for bankruptcy protection. The funding was to be raised through the sale of convertible notes. Having initially been scheduled for March 20, the company pushed back the sale until March 24.

=== 2009 ===
On April 1, 2009, Thornburg Mortgage announced that it would officially cease operations and enter Chapter 11 bankruptcy. After the sale of all remaining assets, it would no longer exist as a going concern.

== Business model ==
While initially operating under a conventional passive mortgage REIT, Thornburg Mortgage later branched out to originating mortgages, selling directly to consumers (direct retail origination) and wholesale origination. The company marketed its products via print advertising, direct mail and online, avoiding the significant expenses associated with maintaining a network of branches. Other ways that the company looked to reduce expenses was by outsourcing the underwriting and servicing of mortgages.

Thornburg Mortgage's customers were typically affluent and with superior credit. According to the company's own figures (as of March 31, 2007), the average borrower had an annual income of $204,012 and a FICO score of 743. The rate of borrower default on these loans had also historically been significantly lower than the industry average.
