= James B. Lockhart III =

American businessman (born 1946)

James B. Lockhart III (born 1946) is an American U.S. Navy officer, business executive, and, since September 2009, Vice Chairman of WL Ross & Co, which manages $9 billion of private equity investments, a hedge fund and a Mortgage Recovery Fund. It is a subsidiary of Invesco, a Fortune 500 investment management firm. He coordinates WL Ross's investments in financial services firms and mortgages. Lockhart serves co-chairs the Bipartisan Policy Center's Commission on Retirement Security and Personal Savings.

For the prior 7 1/2 years, he served in the US Government in a series of Presidential-appointed, Senate-confirmed positions. From July 30, 2008, he was the Director (CEO) and Chairman of the Oversight Board of the Federal Housing Finance Agency (FHFA). He was the Director of the Office of Federal Housing Enterprise Oversight (OFHEO), which is now part of FHFA. He was nominated to that position by President George W. Bush, a friend of his from prep school, college and business school, and confirmed by the United States Senate in June 2006.

He also served on the Financial Stability Oversight Board from its inception in 2008. This board was set up to oversee the Troubled Asset Relief Program, which is chaired by the Chairman of the Federal Reserve Board and has as its other members the Secretaries of the Treasury and HUD, and the Chair of the SEC.

From 2002 to 2006, Lockhart served as The Deputy Commissioner and Chief Operating Officer of the Social Security Administration and as Secretary to the Social Security Board of Trustees. He was a member of President Bush's Management Council and its Executive Committee. At SSA, he was the leader in promoting Social Security reform and in getting the Supplemental Security Income Program, the nation's largest cash-based welfare program, removed from GAO's High Risk list. SSA, OFHEO and FHFA all received the Association of Government Accountants' prestigious Certificate in Excellence for Accountability Reporting.

Lockhart served in President George H.W. Bush's Administration as Executive Director (CEO) of the Pension Benefit Guaranty Corporation (PBGC) from 1989-93. While he was at the PBGC, the agency restored the LTV Steel pension plans through a Supreme Court ruling and faced major airline (Eastern, PanAm, Continental and TWA) and steel company bankruptcies. PBGC also produced its first audited accounts in its history and was removed from GAO's High Risk list under Lockhart's leadership. As a way to encourage better funding of pension plans, he began publishing the “Top 50” underfunded pension plan list. He also pushed for legislative reforms which led to the passage of legislation in 1993.

== Government tenure ==
Within three weeks of his appointment in May 2006, Lockhart published a report detailing the numerous missteps by Fannie Mae's previous management and signed a consent agreement that restated Fannie Mae's extra 30% capital requirement and capped the growth of its investment portfolios for the first time. In a joint press conference with the SEC Chairman, Chris Cox, Lockhart announced a $400 million fine. Shortly thereafter, he obtained Freddie Mac's voluntary agreement to likewise cap the growth of their portfolio.

From the beginning of his tenure as Director of OFHEO, Lockhart warned about the systemic risks Fannie and Freddie posed to the financial system and the need for Congress to grant OFHEO additional regulatory powers. In December 2006, Lockhart wrote an article stating that Fannie Mae and Freddie Mac's “government charters enable these companies to take on more risk than other major financial institutions. In addition to their significant operational difficulties, the Enterprises have lower capital requirements than banks, massive investment and derivative portfolios, limited discipline from credit markets, an inability to diversify their investments and no limit on bank investments in their securities…Fannie Mae and Freddie Mac present very large systemic risks to financial markets and financial institutions. That's why it is vital that Congress pass legislation creating an empowered regulator now.”

He testified in favor of stronger legislation several times and gave numerous speeches which were well chronicled. These efforts were strongly supported by President Bush and Treasury Secretary Paulson. Reform legislation was passed by the House in May 2007 just as what was then considered only a “subprime crisis” was starting to appear. The Senate, however, did not pass the legislation, entitled the Housing and Economic Recovery Act (HERA) until July 2008. President Bush, who had called for GSE reform throughout his Presidency, signed HERA into law in an Oval Office ceremony on July 30. However, HERA was passed too late as stock market, foreign debt and mortgage-backed securities investors worried about their solvency. Lockhart had pushed both GSE's to raise more capital for over a year and in March got their Boards to agree to raise significant equity. The new Federal Housing Finance Agency (FHFA) combined OFHEO; the Federal Housing Board, which regulated the 12 Federal Home Loan Banks; and the HUD group that oversaw Fannie Mae's and Freddie Mac's mission and affordable housing goals. Lockhart became the first director of the new agency and Chairman of its Oversight Board, whose other members were the Secretaries of Treasury and HUD and the Chairman of the SEC.

By August 2008, Fannie Mae and Freddie Mac were unable to raise additional equity while still purchasing over 70% of the mortgages originated in the US. Working closely with Secretary Paulson and Federal Reserve Chairman Bernanke, Lockhart convinced the Boards of Directors of both GSEs to consent to being placed into conservatorship in meetings on Saturday, September 7, 2008. As part of this process, the CEO's and Boards were replaced for both Fannie Mae and Freddie Mac, and the two GSEs continued operations without interruption.

With strong financial support provided by Treasury as authorized by HERA, the mortgage markets calmed temporarily only to be disrupted the following week by the bankruptcy of Lehman Brothers. Secretary Paulson's book, On The Brink, deals extensively with the conservatorships of Fannie Mae and Freddie Mac.

Lockhart's tenure spanned the 2008 financial crisis. The New York Times reported that during his watch, "both Freddie and Fannie had plunged into the riskiest part of the market, gobbling up more than $400 billion in subprime and other alternative mortgages," criticizing Lockhart for lax oversight and not responding to early signs of trouble at those institutions. The FHFA office strenuously defended Lockhart's record in response, citing the fact that he had capped the growth of both Fannie and Freddie's mortgage portfolio for the first time and had “repeatedly called for legislative reforms to increase capital requirements, reduce the size of the Enterprises' portfolios and enhance regulatory authorities, including broadened authority to impose a conservatorship or receivership.”

Lockhart worked closely with the Bush Administration and many housing and financial groups to help stabilize the mortgage market, which was critical for the financial future of Fannie Mae and Freddie Mac as they owned or guaranteed $5.5 trillion of mortgages (57% of all US mortgages). In November 2008, Lockhart announced the Streamlined Mortgage Modification Program designed to prevent the rapidly growing delinquencies turning into foreclosures. He pushed both GSE's to be more creative and responsive in modifying mortgages.

He testified at a hearing on September 23, 2008 with Secretary Paulson, Chairman Bernanke and SEC Chairman Cox on the need for the Troubled Asset Relief Program (TARP). He served as a member with them and HUD Secretary Preston and subsequently their successors as members of the Financial Stability Oversight Board overseeing the $700 billion TARP fund. After the election of President Barack Obama, Lockhart remained in his post as Director of FHFA. He played a key role in the Obama Administration's effort to stem home foreclosures, including the Making Home Affordable Program.

Throughout the market turmoil, he continued to oversee the smooth transition to a new agency. OFHEO and FHFA both received the Association of Government Accountants award – Certificate for Excellence in Accountability Reporting as had Social Security. He worked closely with the 12 Federal Home Loan Bank Presidents as they dealt with their private label MBS problems. He strengthened their Office of Finance's board that produces their combined financial statements.

== Career ==
In 1997, Lockhart co-founded and served as managing director of NetRisk Inc.

Lockhart has served as Senior Vice President, Finance, at National Reinsurance(1996) which was acquired by General Reinsurance; Managing Director in Smith Barney's Investment Banking Group for financial institutions and Co-Head of its Private Equity Group (1993–1995); Vice President and Treasurer of Alexander & Alexander(1981–1989); and Assistant Treasurer of Gulf Oil in Europe and the U.S. (1974–1981). Lockhart served as a member of the American Benefits Council's board of directors and on the advisory board to the Task Force for the Critical Review of the U.S. Actuarial Profession.

== Early life ==
Lockhart was born in White Plains, New York in 1946. He became an Eagle Scout at the early age of 13. He attended Phillips Academy in Andover, Massachusetts for four years where he became a good friend of George W. Bush. During his senior year he moved to St. Paul, MN as his father moved to become CEO of Conwed from being the CFO of Riegel Paper Corporation.

== Military ==
Lockhart joined the Navy in 1969 after spending a year at the First National Bank of St. Paul. At Officer Candidate School, he was the Supply Corps Honor Graduate and at the Navy Supply Corps School he graduated with High Honors. He served as the Supply Officer on the Nuclear Ballistic Submarine USS George Washington Carver (SSBN-656) homeported in Holy Loch, Scotland.

== See also ==
- Armando Falcon
- Stephen Douglas Johnson
