= David Kellermann =

American CFO of Freddie Mac (1967–2009)

David B. Kellermann (August 1967 – April 22, 2009) was the acting chief financial officer of Freddie Mac in early 2009.

== Early life ==
Kellermann graduated from George Washington University with a master's degree in finance after a B.S. in Political Science and Accounting from the University of Michigan. His childhood was spent in Bay City, Michigan. He graduated from T. L. Handy High School (now T. L. Handy Middle School) in 1985.

== Career ==
David Kellermann was named acting chief financial officer of Freddie Mac in September 2008. Kellermann was a member of the company's leadership team and reported directly to CEO David M. Moffett.

As acting chief financial officer, Kellermann was responsible for the company's financial controls, financial reporting, tax, capital oversight, and compliance with the requirements of Sarbanes-Oxley. He also oversaw the company's annual budgeting and financial planning processes.

Prior to this role, he served as senior vice president, corporate controller and principal accounting officer. In this position, his primary responsibility was to support the business with the production of timely, accurate, and well-controlled GAAP, fair value and segment earnings financial statements and external disclosures.

Before that, Kellermann served as the senior vice president and business area controller. As business area controller, he led the organization responsible for all accounting and finance for Freddie Mac’s lines of business.

Kellermann had been with Freddie Mac for more than 16 years. He began as a financial analyst/auditor in 1992, worked for several years in the company's securities sales and trading unit, and has served in a variety of positions in the company's capital markets division, most recently serving as vice president strategy execution and integration and the Investments and Capital Markets division controller.

Kellermann was hired by Freddie Mac as an analyst/auditor in 1992. He worked as a corporate controller. Following the resignation of Anthony "Buddy" Piszel in September 2008, Kellermann was promoted to senior vice president and acting chief financial officer, where he was responsible for financial internal controls, financial reporting, and taxes. He reported directly to the chief executive officer.

Kellermann volunteered as a member of the board of directors of the Coalition for the Homeless.

== Death ==
One day before his death, the Freddie Mac human resources chief met with Kellermann and refused his resignation, asking him to take only a few days off instead. His duties were assigned to Denny Fox, the acting Principal Accounting Officer, and Rob Mailloux, the acting Corporate Controller. He was found dead the next day on April 22, 2009, from hanging in the basement of his home in Vienna, Virginia. Kellermann's wife reported his death as a suicide, and officers at the scene said there were no signs of foul play. He was survived by his wife and six-year-old daughter.
