= Super jumbo mortgage =

In the United States, a super jumbo mortgage is a jumbo mortgage that far exceeds the conforming loan limits. These are typically 4 times the maximum loan amount set by Fannie Mae or Freddie Mac which as of 2024 was $766,551. A super jumbo mortgage would be a mortgage greater than $3 million, although lenders differ on just what constitutes a super jumbo mortgage subject to their own internal investment criteria.

Unlike Jumbo loan limits, the super jumbo mortgage category is not directly defined, controlled, or regulated by any of these aforementioned agencies. Instead, mortgage lenders internally and independently define their own parameters and criteria for what defines a Super Jumbo mortgage. This can depend on the location with the United States the type of home and are usually for luxury homes.

== Risks for the lender ==
Super Jumbo Mortgages present an increased risk to the lender in direct correlation with the size of the loan, substantially more than conforming mortgages. The increased risk of Super Jumbo mortgages is firstly due to the lack of "agency" support for these loans, effectively reducing the available pool of investors and insurers for all jumbo mortgages by an order of magnitude.

Mortgages in excess of 1 million dollars have an even smaller secondary market of investors, and super jumbo mortgages in excess of 2 million dollars frequently require extensive "sourcing" of private investors prior to funding due to minimal institutional investor coverage. The complex nature of funding these loans requires the use of Super Jumbo mortgage specialists, whose compensation requirements are generally too prohibitive for retail banks and mass market lenders to accommodate outside of niche geographic areas, leaving much of the business to private concerns. Private Mortgage Bankers generally focus primarily on doing fewer, but larger deals, and thus have a familiarity with how and where to get these larger loans done. Securitization of Super Jumbo mortgages has not met with the same success as conventional jumbo mortgages. The underlying lack of liquidity for Super Jumbo Mortgage securities is compounded by a reduction in lending capacity for the institutions which must service these larger loans; as they lack a ready market for secondary sale the loans remain "on the books" of the lender, tying up capital in servicing that would otherwise be invested again. The assets against which super jumbo mortgages are secured are primarily classified as "luxury" residential real estate, a segment which is highly prone to market volatility in gross dollar terms. Luxury homes also require substantially more time to market in the event of foreclosure.

== Mitigants ==
In response to the multiple layered risk of writing Super Jumbo mortgages, lenders utilize a few common mitigants in super jumbo mortgage underwriting to reduce their downside exposure. Key Super Jumbo mortgage mitigants include:

=== Loan to value limits ===
Borrowers can expect significantly lower Loan To Value or "LTV" limits on Super Jumbo mortgages, particularly above and beyond $1,500,000. Typical Super Jumbo mortgage LTV maximums range from 80% to as low as 50% depending on loan amount and credit scoring. While 100% or "No Money Down" financing was available up to $2,000,000 until February 2007 from several of the leading Super Jumbo Mortgage Lenders, as of this writing none are currently able to fund LTV ratios higher than 90% for loans in excess of $1,500,000, regardless of credit scoring.

=== Credit Scoring ===
credit score requirements for Super Jumbo Mortgages have become increasingly relaxed since 2002, but credit score standards are still somewhat more stringent for Super Jumbo borrowers than they are for their conforming counterparts. The biggest difference for Super Jumbo mortgage borrowers is the lack of subprime Super Jumbo mortgage programs, meaning that for borrowers with credit scores below 620 who are seeking a Super Jumbo mortgage refinance, the only option might be "Super Jumbo Hard Money" lenders, a category of private lending catering specifically to the needs of high-net-worth individuals with temporarily blemished credit scores, bankruptcy issues, or foreclosure problems.

=== Loan Purpose Guidelines ===
Generally Speaking, lenders will allow borrowers to refinance or purchase a home utilizing a Super Jumbo mortgage, but refinance guidelines for these loans generally require lower LTVs than purchase money.

Borrowers wishing to "Cash Out" in a super jumbo mortgage refinance can expect limits not only to LTV but also to gross cash proceeds from the transaction. Cash out refinancing is a very popular use of Super Jumbo mortgages, as it allows individuals to "take profits" from appreciated real estate with minimal tax consequences. Some lenders do allow for unlimited cash out on Super Jumbo mortgage refinance transactions, but their number is declining in step with the broader mortgage markets.

=== Interest Rate ===
While Interest Rates are rarely the focal point of a typical Super Jumbo mortgage borrower's shopping list (most focus on cash flow and tax benefits), lenders routinely charge higher interest rates on super jumbo mortgage products than they would for a borrower with similar qualifying criteria in a conventional jumbo loan, in large part to account for their risk and reduction of liquidity. Below $1,000,000, super jumbo mortgage rates are generally within 50 basis points (half of a percent) of an equivalent jumbo mortgage interest rate, but above $2,000,000 rates can be 1% to 2% higher or more.

=== Multiple Appraisals & Reviews ===
Due to the difficulty of setting market values for luxury homes, it is not unusual for super jumbo mortgage lenders to require 2 full appraisals at a minimum for properties valued at $1,500,000 or more. Should the subject property be unique, or comparable sales be difficult to obtain for the purpose of deriving value, additional field review appraisals, desk review appraisals, and broker price opinions may be ordered to substantiate the property's value. This is a significant concern for the lender as the asset in which they are taking a security interest must have a reasonable value to justify their risk and associated premiums.

== Amortization Types ==
While historically super jumbo mortgages were primarily short term adjustable rate principal & interest mortgages, interest only options and payment cap or negative amortization loans (called "Option ARM" mortgages) were introduced to the category in the early 1980s to counteract typical 12% rates of the time. While 30-year fixed rate mortgages are available in the super jumbo category, they do not represent the majority of super jumbo mortgages. 3/1 ARM, 5/1 ARM, 7/1 ARM and 10/1 ARM Adjustable Rate Mortgages are more popular among super jumbo mortgage applicants than with the general public, but the greatest increase in originations as a category has been so called "exotic" Super Jumbo Mortgages. Offering interest only and negative amortization features, these loans allow borrowers to choose a lower payment option than a conventional principal & interest mortgage, often 10 to 20% lower in the case of interest only amortization and up to 50% lower or more in the case of deferred interest options.

== Trends ==
Due to the unconventional requirements of many super jumbo mortgage applicants, the popularity of unconventional mortgage programs amongst the wealthy is understandable. The popularity in particular of cash flow option ARM loans with super jumbo mortgage applicants is due in large part to the difference in perception of negative amortization in the context of their primary residence not being an asset but a liability. When home equity is substantial as required by the more stringent LTV requirements of super jumbo mortgage underwriting, negative amortization allows a borrower to extract more of the cash locked in the home's equity than would otherwise be possible, short of selling the property, due to the ability to defer interest above and beyond the Loan To Value stipulated on the note. In a conventional mortgage with principal and interest or interest only amortization, the borrower would be required to take out a second mortgage or line of credit to accomplish the same goal, but CLTV guidelines from most super jumbo lenders preclude the use of most of these products for this purpose. This is not to say that second mortgages and lines of credit are uncommon in super jumbo lending, in fact quite the opposite is true, but "piggyback" or "80/20" transactions which are common in conforming and jumbo loan financing are not as prevalent. Another popular application for the use of negative amortization loans by super jumbo mortgage borrowers is to shift as much of their taxable income to long term capital gains as possible by taking advantage of the lower monthly carrying costs and the ability to make lump sum payments at annual or semi-annual intervals. Super Jumbo Option ARM mortgages are also available in hybrid form, with fixed rate and fixed payment periods of 3, 5, 7 or 10 years, although they are relatively new on the super jumbo mortgage scene and not necessarily available to 8-figure loan amounts ($10 million and up).

Super Jumbo mortgage lending is a niche activity, not engaged in directly by most consumer focused banks. The preponderance of Super Jumbo lending is arranged by mortgage companies who specialize in financing these multimillion-dollar transactions with the help of investment banks and private mortgage capital sources.

=== Effects of Recent Events ===
Recent events constraining liquidity, securitization, and demand in the capital markets for structured debt securities have severely impacted the ability of conventional lenders to make loans larger than the Fannie Mae conforming loan limit ($417,000 for a single family residence in most states). This is due primarily to the inability of most mortgage originators to sell or otherwise deliver large loans to investors. Unable to sell, the originating lender must then retain and service the loan utilizing their existing capital. The net effect has been an overall reduction in the Loan To Value permissible in a traditional super jumbo mortgage and an increase in the level of income documentation required for such large mortgages by comparison to the period from 2003 to June 2007, during which time the capital markets were willing and able to purchase these securities. The current constraints are leading mortgagors (homeowners seeking super jumbo mortgages) to make larger cash down payments to make up for the reduction in leverage currently being afforded, and a resurgence in the utilization of mortgages from private banks and other non-traditional and non-MBS lenders.

In response to the tightened lender guidelines for loans over $1,000,000, many borrowers are using specialty mortgage brokers to assist with these unique loans.
