= Armando Falcon =

American civil servant

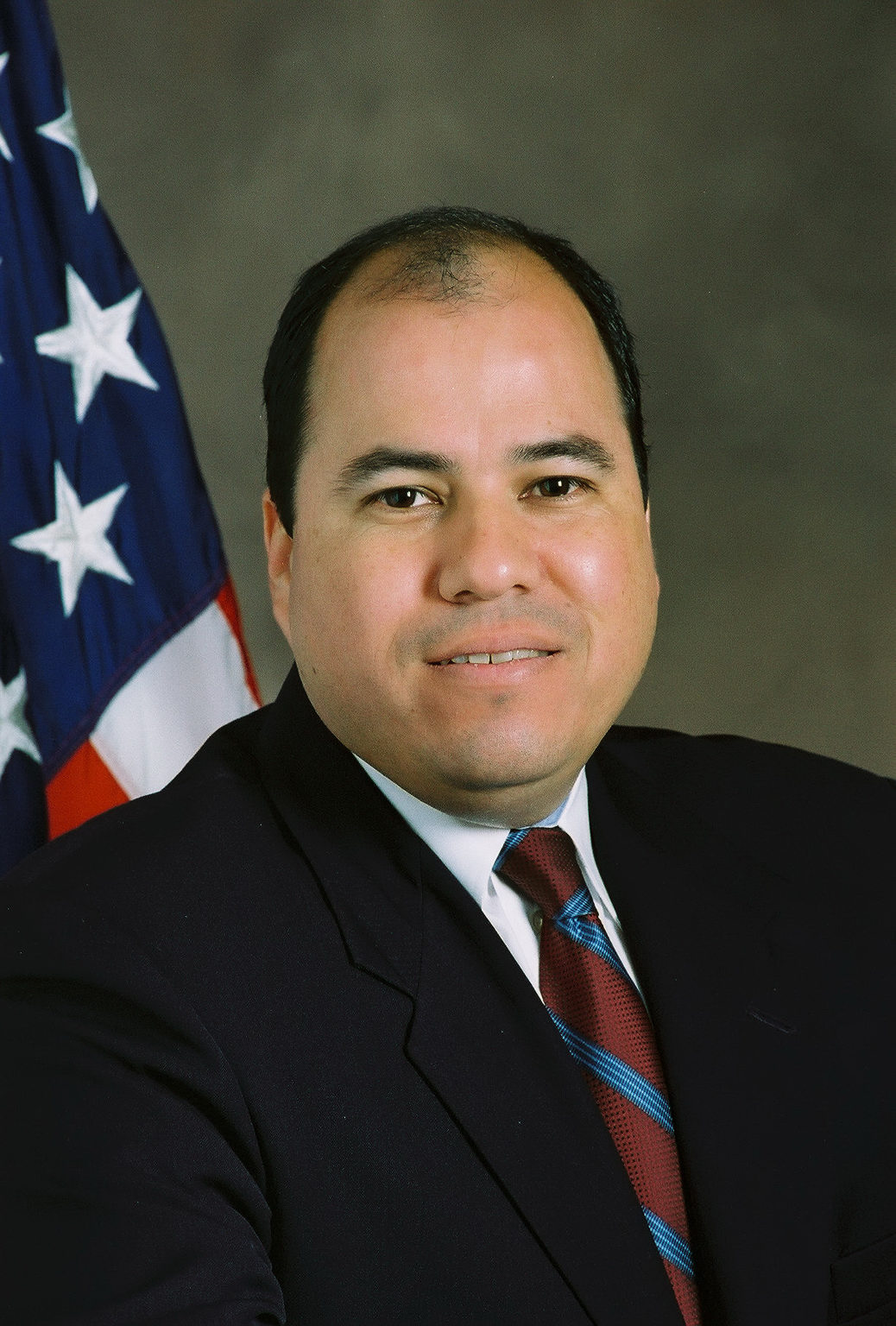
Armando Falcon

Armando Falcon, Jr. (born June 4, 1960) is the former Director of the Office of Federal Housing Enterprise Oversight (OFHEO), a position he held from 1999 to 2005. During this period, he led an investigation of financial misconduct at Fannie Mae and Freddie Mac, is credited with raising early warning signs about the risks posed by both companies.

The end result of the investigation led by Armando Falcon against Fannie Mae accounting – No misconduct by Fannie Mae CFO J. Timothy Howard and special recognition by the judge in the subject case of Mr. Howard's honest and ethical performance of his duties.

== Career ==
Prior to OFHEO, Falcon served on the legal staff of the Committee on Banking and Financial Services in the U.S. House, where he joined as Counsel in 1989 and was promoted to General Counsel in 1995. While at the Banking Committee, he acted as an adviser on many major financial issues, including the Savings and Loan crisis, and also helped to draft legislation regarding the Export-Import Bank, Deposit Insurance, Anti-Money Laundering, the Community Development Act and Government Securities Reform. He was also involved in the oversight of all financial regulators including the World Bank, the IMF, multilateral development banks, the Federal Reserve, the Office of the Comptroller of the Currency and other banking regulators.

Before joining the Banking Committee, Falcon worked briefly as a private attorney and as a law clerk to the Texas Attorney General from 1986 to 1988.

Since 2009, Falcon has served on the advisory board of the Comptroller General of the Government Accountability Office. In addition, he is the CEO of Falcon Capital Advisors, a Washington-based consulting firm.

== Education ==
Falcon holds a J.D. from The University of Texas School of Law, as well as a masters in public policy from the John F. Kennedy School of Government at Harvard University and an undergraduate degree from St. Mary's University in San Antonio, TX.

== Personal life ==
Armando Falcon currently resides in Virginia, and is married with two children.

== See also ==
- Stephen Douglas Johnson
- James B. Lockhart III
