= Maxine Baker =

Maxine Baker is the name of:

- Maxine B. Baker (born 1952), American businesswoman
- Maxine Baker (politician) (1898–1994), American politician
- Maxine Baker, character in The Children's Crusade
