= Loan officer =

People who evaluate loans

Loan officers evaluate, authorize, or recommend approval of loan applications for people and businesses.

Most loan officers are employed by commercial banks, credit unions, mortgage companies, and related financial institutions. Mortgage loan officers must be licensed.

== Duties ==
Loan officers typically do the following:

- Contact companies or people to ask if they need a loan
- Meet with loan applicants to gather personal information and answer questions
- Explain different types of loans and the terms of each type to applicants
- Obtain, verify, and analyze the applicant's financial information, such as the credit rating and income level
- Review loan agreements to ensure that they comply with federal and state regulations
- Approve loan applications or refer them to management for a decision
- Loan officers use a process called underwriting to assess whether applicants qualify for loans. After collecting and verifying all the required financial documents, the loan officer evaluates the information they obtain to determine the applicant's need for a loan and ability to pay back the loan. Most firms use underwriting software, which produces a recommendation for the loan based on the applicant's financial status. After the underwriting software produces a recommendation, loan officers review the output of the software and consider any additional information to make a final decision.

The work of loan officers has sizable customer-service and sales components. Loan officers often answer questions and guide customers through the application process. In addition, many loan officers must market the products and services of their lending institution and actively solicit new business.

== Types of loan officers ==
Commercial loan officers specialize in loans to businesses, which often use the loans to buy supplies and upgrade or expand operations. Commercial loans frequently are larger and more complicated than other types of loans. Because companies have such complex financial situations and statements, commercial loans usually require human judgment in addition to the analysis by underwriting software. Furthermore, some commercial loans are so large that no single bank will provide the entire amount requested. In such cases, loan officers may have to work with multiple banks to put together a package of loans.

Consumer loan officers specialize in loans to people. Consumers take out loans for many reasons, such as buying a car or paying college tuition. For some simple consumer loans, the underwriting process is fully automated. However, the loan officer is still needed to guide applicants through the process and to handle cases with unusual circumstances. Some institutions—usually small banks and credit unions—do not use underwriting software and instead rely on loan officers to complete the underwriting process manually.

Mortgage loan officers specialize in loans used to buy real estate (property and buildings), which are called mortgage loans. Mortgage loan officers work on loans for both residential and commercial properties. Often, mortgage loan officers must seek out clients, which requires developing relationships with real estate companies and other sources that can refer prospective applicants.

Within these three fields, some loan officers specialize in a particular part of the loan process:

Loan collection officers contact borrowers who fail to make their loan payments on time. They work with borrowers to help them find a way to keep paying off the loan. If the borrower continues to miss payments, loan officers start the process of taking away what the borrower used to secure the loan (called "collateral")—often a home or car—and selling it to repay the loan.

Loan underwriters specialize in evaluating whether a client is creditworthy. They collect, verify, and evaluate the client's financial information provided on their loan applications and then use loan underwriting software to produce recommendations.

== Requirements ==
Most loan officers need a bachelor's degree and receive on-the-job training. Mortgage loan officers must be licensed.

=== Education ===
Loan officers typically need a bachelor's degree, usually in a field such as business or finance. Because commercial loan officers analyze the finances of businesses applying for credit, they need to understand general business accounting, including how to read financial statements.

Some job seekers may be able to enter the occupation without a bachelor's degree if they have related work experience, such as experience in sales, customer service, or banking.

Once hired, loan officers usually receive some on-the-job training. This may be a combination of formal, company-sponsored training and informal training during the first few months on the job.

=== Licenses, certifications, and registrations ===
Mortgage loan officers in the United States must have a Mortgage Loan Originator (MLO) license. To become licensed, they must complete at least 20 hours of coursework, pass an exam, and submit to background and credit checks. Licenses must be renewed annually, and individual states may have additional requirements.

Several banking associations, including the American Bankers Association and the Mortgage Bankers Association, as well as a number of schools, offer courses, training programs, or certifications for loan officers. Although not required, certification shows dedication and expertise and thus may enhance a candidate's employment opportunities.

== Work environment ==
In the United States, loan officers held about 354,800 jobs in 2022. The largest employers of loan officers were as follows:

- Credit intermediation and related activities - 82%
- Management of companies and enterprises - 4%
- Automobile dealers - 3%

The credit intermediation industry includes commercial banks, savings institutions, and mortgage companies.

Loan officers who specialize in consumer loans usually work in offices. Mortgage and commercial loan officers may work outside the office and meet with clients at their homes or businesses.

== Pay ==
The median annual wage for loan officers in the United States was $65,740 in May 2022. The lowest 10 percent earned less than $34,920, and the highest 10 percent earned more than $138,580.

In May 2022, the median annual wages for loan officers in the top industries in which they worked were as follows:

- Automobile dealers - $92,230
- Management of companies and enterprises - $76,870
- Credit intermediation and related activities - $64,390

The form of compensation varies widely by employer. Some loan officers are paid a flat salary; others are paid on commission. Those on commission usually are paid a base salary plus a commission for the loans they originate. Loan officers also may receive extra commission or bonuses based on the number of loans they originate or how well the loans perform.

== Job outlook ==
In the United States, employment of loan officers is projected to grow three percent from 2022 to 2032, about as fast as the average for all occupations. Although the demand for loan officers will increase as the overall economy grows, the decline of bank branches and the increased use of productivity-enhancing technology in loan processing are expected to slow employment growth.

Increased demand for loan officers is expected as both businesses and individuals seek credit to finance commercial investments and personal spending. Loan officers will be needed to evaluate the creditworthiness of applicants and determine the likelihood that loans will be paid back in full and on time.

About 25,300 openings for loan officers are projected each year, on average, over the decade. Many of those openings are expected to result from the need to replace workers who transfer to different occupations or exit the labor force, such as to retire.

== See also ==
- Loan
- Loan origination
- Mortgage broker
- Pre-qualification (lending)
