= Mortgage origination =

Start of mortgage process

In consumer lending, mortgage origination, a specialized subset of loan origination, is the process by which a lender works with a borrower to complete a mortgage transaction, resulting in a mortgage loan. A mortgage loan is a loan in which property or real estate is used as collateral run by private individuals, families, or investors rather than the government or the general public, borrowers must submit various types of financial information and documentation to a mortgage lender, including tax returns, payment history, credit card information and bank balances. Mortgage lenders use this information to determine the type of loan and the interest rate for which the borrower is eligible. The process in the United States has become complex due to the proliferation of loan products and consumer protection regulations.

== Mortgage origination process ==
The mortgage origination, a subset of loan origination, is a complex and evolved process that involves many steps, in purple, which varies from lender to lender. The basic steps include

- Take application: this step is initiated by a borrower and results in an application to borrow money to purchase a real estate property that includes details of the mortgage product, property specifications, borrower information and supporting documentation. The application is filled out by the borrower, either through self-services or with the help of a loan officer.
- Processing: loan processors ensure accurate packaging of the loan, which includes ensuring that all loan documentation is complete, verified, and compliant for underwriting. The loan processor then orders services and coordinates loan documents.
- Underwriting: determining if the risk of offering a mortgage loan to a particular borrower under certain parameters is acceptable, and includes verification, appraisal, title search and insurance, flood certification, and surveying.
- Closing/funding: a settlement agent manages the logistics of providing borrowers final loan documents for review and signing, releasing and wiring the funds, and recording the mortgage at which point the mortgage is official.
- Shipping and delivery: documents are reviewed for auditing and quality control purposes, copies are sent to investors, and purchase notifications are sent to other departments.

== Key consumer protection regulations ==
The mortgage origination process in the United States is required to comply with the following regulations:

- Fair Housing Act: enacted in 1963, makes it "unlawful to refuse to sell, rent to, or negotiate with any person because of that person's inclusion in a protected class".
- Equal Credit Opportunity Act (ECOA): enacted in 1974, that makes it unlawful for any creditor to discriminate against any applicant, with respect to any aspect of a credit transaction, on the basis of race, color, religion, national origin, sex, marital status, or age (provided the applicant has the capacity to contract).
- Home Mortgage Disclosure Act (HMDA): enacted in 1975, to provide information that shows whether financial institutions are serving local housing credit needs, and to aid public officials in targeting public investments.
- Dodd–Frank Wall Street Reform and Consumer Protection Act (Dodd-Frank): enacted in 2010 as a response to the 2008 financial crisis, it brought the most significant changes to financial regulation in the United States since the regulatory reform that followed the Great Depression. It made changes in the American financial regulatory environment that affected all federal financial regulatory agencies and almost every part of the nation's financial services industry.
- TILA-RESPA Integrated Disclosure Rule (TRID): effective October 2015, TRID was required by the Dodd-Frank act and requires the use of new, integrated disclosure forms for consumers at the time of application and settlement-known as the Loan Estimate (LE) and the Closing Disclosure (CD). It builds on the Truth in Lending Act (TILA) enacted in 1968 that requires disclosures about its terms and cost to standardize the manner in which costs associated with borrowing are calculated and disclosed, and the Real Estate Settlement Procedures Act (RESPA) enacted in 1974 that protects homeowners by assisting them in becoming better educated while shopping for real estate services, and eliminating kickbacks and referral fees which add unnecessary costs to settlement services.

== Mortgage origination tools ==
Mortgage origination tools fall into three categories:

- Point Of Sale (POS): the platform that allows the lender to make the sale with a borrower. It may interface directly with the borrower, a loan officer, or both. POS systems may include borrower self-help, data validation, and compliance checking to ensure the loan application is ready for processing and underwriting.
- Loan Origination System (LOS): the platform that takes a completed loan application and facilitates the mortgage transaction from processing to shipping. LOS systems may include document management, designing, and compliance checking to decrease risk and increase loan quality.
- Mortgage origination services: Services that are used throughout the mortgage origination process and include appraisal, pricing, flood, fraud, title, and credit checks.
