= Stephen Douglas Johnson =

American lawyer

- Born: 1963; Flossmoor, Illinois, U.S.
- Died: 2003 (aged 39–40); Washington, D.C., U.S.
- Education: Tulane University of Louisiana
- Occupation: Lawyer

Stephen Douglas Johnson (1963–2003) was a Washington, D.C. banking lawyer, and a chief lobbyist for the banking and insurance industries. He was U.S. House chief counsel for Financial Institutions and Consumer Credit from February 1995 to November 1997, the heyday of the Gingrich Revolution.

Johnson was also the Bush administration's senior advisor to the Office of Federal Housing Enterprise Oversight (OFHEO), where he assisted the director Armando Falcon in the investigation of financial misconduct at Fannie Mae and Freddie Mac. Falcon was forced to resign in February 2003 by President George W. Bush for releasing critical oversight reports stemming from the investigation. The investigation and reports were harbingers of the worldwide financial crisis which was to occur. The forced resignation of Falcon led Johnson to resign immediately. even though Bush allowed Falcon to finish his term.

== Early life and education ==
Johnson was raised in Flossmoor, Illinois.

He graduated cum laude from Tulane University of Louisiana in 1985. Beforehand, he had attended Germany's University of Hamburg. He received his J.D. from Tulane Law School in 1988 and his L.L.M. in Banking Law from Boston University's School of Law in 1989.

== Career ==
=== Early career ===
Johnson began his career as an associate with Muldoon, Murphy and Faucette, a Washington, D.C.-based law firm whose specialty was S & L conversions in the late 1980s and 1990s. He then became regulatory counsel for ISD/Shaw, now Federal Analytics, Inc, which was headed by Karen Shaw, for whom he contributed to the three-volume Combating Credit Discrimination published by the Chicago-based American Bankers Institute.

=== House Financial Services Subcommittee ===
Johnson was chief counsel of the United States House Financial Services Subcommittee on Financial Institutions and Consumer Credit from late January 1995 through November 1997, which were the years of Newt Gingrich's reforms. Rather than being ideological, Johnson was a pragmatic liberal Republican who endeavored to advance reform and modernization of the financial services sector; to seek fair tax and other benefits for all Americans; and to clarify for the common good privacy, credit, and other issues relevant to the banking, insurance, and securities industries. He also negotiated with the Federal Reserve Board, the Treasury Department, and other federal agencies on all jurisdictional matters. He often got Alan Greenspan and John D. Hawke, Jr. then undersecretary of the U.S. Treasury, to testify at U.S. House hearings which were shaped by him. While he served as chief counsel under Chairperson Marge Roukema, he also had to strike a balance between the diverse personalities composing the subcommittee membership that included Bill McCollum, Toby Roth, Sonny Bono, Ron Paul, Gerald C. Weller, Peter T. King, and Doug Bereuter of the majority to Joseph Kennedy II, Charles E. Schumer, Bruce Vento, Kweisi Mfume, John J. LaFalce, Carolyn B. Maloney, Ken Bentsen, and Cynthia A. McKinney, to achieve outcomes with which they all could live. Johnson also worked with and for the full banking committee's chairman, Jim Leach.

=== House Subcommittee on Domestic and International Policy ===
Johnson was counsel to the United States House Subcommittee on Domestic and International Policy. As such, he met with banking and insurance industries representatives and others who were affected by them. He saw a wide array of people with divergent interests, such as Hugh McColl of Bank of America, James Robinson of American Express, or former Congressman John B. Anderson regarding a very localized banking matter or the leadership of ACORN. Often, Johnson shared the speaker's dais with these same individuals at events such as ABA conventions, and Princeton University's Woodrow Wilson School of Public Affairs forums. Overall, Johnson was "by all accounts well-liked and respected. Both banking and insurance representatives lauded his talent and abilities with both the Council of Insurance Agents & Brokers and the Bankers Roundtable not shy about praising him".

After his United States House of Representatives experience, Johnson helped raise the profile of the National Association of Insurance Commissioners in his brief tenure. He then worked as assistant vice president of the American Insurance Association until August 1999, for which he also advocated the interests of the insurance industry before the European Union and World Trade Organization (WTO).

=== Columbus Group ===
Johnson then became vice president and senior counsel of the Columbus Group/Columbia Capitol Corporation, whose managing directors included Mark Warner, now the junior U. S. senator from Virginia.

=== Federal Housing Enterprise Oversight ===
When the Bush Administration took office in January 2001, Johnson became senior advisor to the Office of Federal Housing Enterprise Oversight, where he addressed legislative and regulatory issues involving Fannie Mae and Freddie Mac, and assisted the director, Armando Falcon, on all other agency matters. Falcon's and Johnson's investigations of these two government chartered agencies led to criticisms of the two, which foreshadowed the worldwide financial crisis.

=== International consulting ===
Falcon was forced to resign by President George W. Bush on February 4, 2003, and Johnson quit immediately thereafter. He soon left for New York City to pursue work in international consulting.

== Death ==
Johnson died on September 18, 2003, at George Washington University Hospital in Washington, D.C., from complications from a fall during the Northeast blackout of 2003 (August 14, 2003) and from other health problems. At the time of his death, Johnson was in Washington, D.C., on business. Her was interred in the Flossmoor area, having wished to be buried near his maternal grandfather, Jan Crull, a scion of an old Dutch Protestant Patrician family and a man who had achieved success before World War II and never repeated it thereafter. Johnson adored his grandfather, who man taught him that one should take life as it is; do the best one can with it; and never look back, not even in anger.
