= Loan origination =

Beginning of a loan process

Loan origination is the process by which a borrower applies for a new loan, and a lender processes that application. Origination generally includes all the steps from taking a loan application up to disbursal of funds (or declining the application). For mortgages, there is a specific mortgage origination process. Loan servicing covers everything after disbursing the funds until the loan is fully paid off. Loan origination is a specialized version of new account opening for financial services organizations. Certain people and organizations specialize in loan origination, such as mortgage brokers and other mortgage originator companies.

There are many different types of loans. Steps involved in originating a loan vary by loan type, various kinds of loan risk, regulator, lender policy etc.

Computerized loan origination (CLO) services include Shelternet (by First Boston), LoanExpress (by the Planning Research Corporation), Rennie Mae (by the American Financial Network), and Mortgage Power Plus (by Citicorp). Although computerization did initially face some opposition, in accordance with the electronic markets hypothesis (EMH), it had not led to a fundamental shift in the home mortgage industry by the 1990s.

Roman Inderst suggested in 2009 that loan origination takes time and effort from loan officers. As a result, higher competition leads to a shift from soft-information to hard-information lending, as well as to the use of credit scores. Similarly, Bedayo et al. (2020) found that, in Spain, loan origination time gets shorter when VIX (a measure of market volatility) is higher.

== See also ==
- Loan servicing
