= Mortgage underwriting =

Process in risk management

Mortgage underwriting is the process a lender uses to determine if the risk (especially the risk that the borrower will default ) of offering a mortgage loan to a particular borrower is acceptable and is a part of the larger mortgage origination process. Most of the risks and terms that underwriters consider fall under the five C’s of underwriting: credit, capacity, cashflow, collateral, and character. (This is also known in the UK as the three canons of credit - capacity, collateral, and character.)

To help the underwriter assess the quality of the loan, banks and lenders create guidelines and even computer models that analyze the various aspects of the mortgage and provide recommendations regarding the risks involved. However, it is always up to the underwriter to make the final decision on whether to approve or decline a loan.

== Risks for the lender ==
Risks for the lender are of three forms: interest rate risk, default risk, and prepayment risk.

There is a risk to the lender that the rate on an adjustable-rate mortgage may decrease. If this is not matched by correlated decreases in rates on the lender's liabilities, profits will suffer.

If a rate on a mortgage contract increases significantly, this is normally favorable to the lender in the absence of correlated increases in rates on liabilities. However, the lender faces the risk that the interest rate increase could be unaffordable to the borrower, forcing the borrower into default, in which case it could be necessary to foreclose on the property (with substantial costs of foreclosure).

In addition, the lender faces the risk that the value of the property underlying the mortgage could drop in value to below the outstanding balance on the mortgage; if this event induces the borrower to default due to moral hazard, the lender must not only incur the costs of implementing a foreclosure but also must sell the property at a price that fails to recoup the lender's investment.

One additional risk for lenders is prepayment. If market interest rates drop, a borrower could refinance the fixed-rate mortgage, leaving the lender with an amount that now can be invested only at a lower rate of return. This risk can be mitigated by various sorts of prepayment penalties that will make it unprofitable to refinance even if the rates of other lenders decrease.

== See also ==
- Credit risk
- Mortgage underwriting in the United States
