= Mortgage underwriting in the United States =

Mortgage underwriting is the process a lender uses to determine if the risk of offering a mortgage loan to a particular borrower under certain parameters is acceptable. Most of the risks and terms that underwriters consider fall under the three C's of underwriting: credit, capacity and collateral.

To help the underwriter assess the quality of the loan, banks and lenders create guidelines and even computer models that analyze the various aspects of the mortgage and provide recommendations regarding the risks involved. Because large securitizers such as the GSEs and other banks are large purchasers of loans from originators, and because many originators lack the balance sheets to hold onto loans for extended periods, automated underwriting guidelines are a crucial determinant of whether a mortgage will be made and at what price. In the U.S. the mortgage underwriting processing is done by a software called Automated Underwriting System (AUS). There are 2 AUS systems, and algorithms designed for this purpose, the first one Desktop Underwriting (DU) is designed by Fannie Mae and Loan Prospector (LP) by Freddie Mac. Some lenders still manually underwrite the loan if the borrower doesn't pass the AUS but has additional compensating factors to be able to obtain the loan.

== Credit reports ==
Credit is what the underwriter uses to review how well a borrower manages his or her current and prior debts. Usually documented by a credit report from each of the three credit bureaus, Equifax, Transunion and Experian, the credit report provides information such as credit scores, the borrower's current and past information about credit cards, loans, collections, repossession and foreclosures and public records (tax liens, judgments and bankruptcies). Typically, a borrower's credit is highly related to the probability that the loan will go into default (failure to make monthly installments).

In reviewing a credit report, the credit score is considered. The credit score is an indicator of how well a borrower manages debt. Using a mathematical model, the data regarding each item on the credit report is used to produce a number between 350 and 850, known as the credit score. Higher scores represent those with less risk. When lenders refer to a representative credit score, they are referring to the median score. When multiple borrowers are involved typically the borrower with lowest median score is the one that is considered the representative credit score. Other loan programs may consider the person that earns the most money, also known as the primary wage earner, that has the representative credit score. On many loan programs there are minimum score guidelines.

The most influential aspect of the credit report is quality of the credit on a person's current housing. For an example, if the borrower already has a mortgage, whether or not the borrower has paid that mortgage on time is indicative of how well they will pay in the future. This also holds true with people that rent. A lender will typically analyze the most recent 12–24 months of the borrower's housing history (also called Listing History). Delinquencies during that time period are usually unacceptable.

In addition, the history of payment of loans and revolving credit is considered. A lender may require that a certain number of deposit accounts be opened for at least 24 months and have recent activity with on time payments to build a pattern of responsible use of credit.

The credit report also contains the borrowers past derogatory credit. This include collections, charge offs, repossession, foreclosures, bankruptcies, liens and judgments. Typically, if any of these items are present on the report, it increases the risk of the loan. For more serious blemishes such as foreclosures and bankruptcies, a lender may require up to two to seven years from the date of satisfaction indicated by the report before approving a loan. Furthermore, the lender may require the borrower to reestablish the credit by obtaining a certain amount of new credit to rebuild their credit. It is also the prerogative of the lender to require that all collections, charge offs, liens and judgments be paid prior to closing the loan.

== Income analysis ==
Capacity refers to the borrower's ability to make the payments on the loan. To determine this, the underwriter will analyze the borrower's employment, income, their current debt and their assets.

While reviewing the borrower's employment, the underwriter must determine the stability of the income. People who are employed by a company and earn hourly wages pose the lowest risk. Self-employed borrowers pose the highest risk, since they are typically responsible for the debt and well-being of the business in addition to their personal responsibilities. Commission income also carries similar risks in the stability of income because if for any reason the borrower fails to produce business, it directly influences the amount of income produced. Usually if self-employment or commission income is used to qualify for the mortgage, a two-year history of receiving that income is required. Although a bonus (sometimes it is indicated as "incentive pay" by many corporations) is part of the paystub income, a two-year employer verification is also required.

Documentation of the income also varies depending on the type of income. Hourly wage earners who have the lowest risks usually need to supply paystubs and W-2 statements. However, self-employed, commissioned and those who collect rent are required to provide tax returns (Schedule C, Schedule E and K-1). Retired individuals are required to prove they are eligible for social security and document the receipt of payments, while those who receive income via cash investments must provide statements and determine the continuance of the income from those payments. In short, the underwriter must determine and document that the income and employment is stable enough to pay the mortgage in years to come.

Furthermore, underwriters evaluate the capacity to pay the loan using a comparative method known as the debt-to-income ratio. This is calculated by adding the monthly liabilities and obligations (mortgage payments, monthly credit and loan payments, child support, alimony, etc.) and dividing it by the monthly income. For an example, if a borrower has a $500 car payment, $100 in credit and loan payments, pays $500 in child support and wants a mortgage with payments $1,000 per month, her total monthly obligations is $2100. If she makes $5,000 a month, her debt to income ratio is 42%. Typically the ratio must be below anywhere from 32% for the most conservative loans to 65% for the most aggressive loans.

Assets are also considered when evaluating capacity. Borrowers who have an abundance of liquid assets at the time of closing statistically have lower rates of default on their mortgage. This is termed as reserves by the industry. For example, with a total mortgage payment that is $1,000 a month and the borrower has $3,000 left after paying the down payment and closing costs, the borrower has three months reserves. Underwriters also look closely at bank statements for incidences of NSF's (non-sufficient funds). If this happens regularly, this is a red flag with the underwriter because this indicates that the borrower doesn't know how to manage his or her finances.

When a borrower receives a gift for the down payment the assets need to be verified. Any large deposits, in fact, showing on bank statements will require an explanation from the borrower.

Furthermore, if the borrower's employment is interrupted for any reason, the borrowers would have enough cash in reserve to pay their mortgage. The amount of cash reserves is qualified by the number of payments the borrower can make on his or her total housing expenditure (the total of the principal and interest payment, taxes, insurance, homeowners insurance, mortgage insurance, and any other applicable charges) before the reserves are completely exhausted. Often lenders will require anywhere from two to twelve months of payments in reserve. If a borrower is applying for an FHA (Federal Housing Administration), there are no reserves required.

The most typical asset is a borrower's checking and savings account. Other sources include retirement funds (401K, Individual Retirement Account), investments (stocks, mutual funds, CDs) and any other liquid source of funds. Funds that have penalties for withdrawing must be considered conservatively and are evaluated at 70% or less of their value. Accounts such as pensions and other accounts and personal property that lack liquidity may not be used as assets.

== Collateral ==
Collateral refers to the type of property, value, the use of the property and everything related to these aspects. Property type can be classified as the following in the order of risk from lowest to highest: single family residence, PUD, duplex, townhouse, low rise condominium, high rise condominium, triplex and four-plexes and condotels. Occupancy is also considered part of collateral. A home can be owner occupied, used as second home or investment. Owner occupied and second homes have the least amount of default, while investment properties have higher occurrences of default. Depending upon the combination of occupancy and type of collateral, the lender will adjust the amount of risk they are willing to take.

Besides occupancy and property type, value is also considered. Price, value, and cost are three different characteristics of a home. Price is the dollar amount that a seller agrees to sell a house to another party. Cost is the dollar amount needed to build the home including labor and materials. Value, which is usually the most important characteristic, is the dollar amount that is supported by recent sales of properties that have similar characteristics, in the same neighborhood and appeal to a consumer. Under fair marketing circumstances when the seller is not in distress and the housing market is not under volatile conditions, price and value should be very comparable.

To determine the value, an appraisal is usually obtained. In addition to determining the value of the property, it is the appraiser’s responsibility to identify the market conditions, the appeal and amenities of the neighborhood and the condition and characteristics of the property. Value is determined by comparing recent sales of similar neighboring properties. The appraiser may make reasonable adjustments to the sales price of the other properties for lot size, square footage of the home, number of bedrooms and bathrooms and other additions such as garages, swimming pools and decks. It is the underwriter's responsibility to review the appraisal and request any further information necessary to support the value and marketability of the property. If the home needs to be foreclosed upon, the lender must be able to sell the property to recoup their losses.

The comparative analysis of the collateral is known as loan to value (LTV). Loan to value is a ratio of the loan amount to the value of the property. In addition, the combined loan to value (CLTV) is the sum of all liens against the property divided by the value. For example, if the home is valued at $200,000 and the first mortgage is $100,000 with second mortgage of $50,000, the LTV is 50% while the CLTV is 75%. Naturally, the higher LTV and CLTVs increase the risk of loan. Furthermore, borrowers who contribute significant down payment (lowering the LTV) statistically have lower incidents of foreclosure.

The type of the loan also may affect the LTV and is considered when evaluating the collateral. Most loans include payments towards the principal balance of the mortgage. These pose the lowest risk since the LTV is decreasing as the mortgage payments are paid. Recently, interest only mortgage have become increasingly popular. These mortgages allow the borrower to make payments that simply meet the interest due on the loan without making any contribution to the principal balance. In addition, there are loans that allow negative amortization, which means the payments do not meet the interest due on loan. Therefore, the interest that is not paid is subsequently added to the principal balance of the loan. In this case, it is possible to owe more than the value of the home during the course of the loan, which exposes the lender to the highest risk.

To offset the risk of high LTV's, the lender may require what is called mortgage insurance. Mortgage insurance insures the lender against losses that may occur when a borrower defaults on his or her mortgage. Typically, this is required on loans that have LTV's that exceed 80%. The cost of the mortgage insurance is passed on to the borrower as an added expense to their monthly payment, but some banks allow what is called lender paid insurance, where the interest rate is higher in exchange for the lender paying the mortgage insurance. All government loans such an FHA and VA require mortgage insurance, regardless of the LTV.

== Automated underwriting ==
Fannie Mae and Freddie Mac are the two largest companies that purchase mortgages from other lenders in the United States. Many lenders will underwrite their files according to their guidelines, but to ensure the eligibility to be purchased by Fannie Mae and Freddie Mac, underwriters will utilize what is called automated underwriting. This is a tool available to lenders to provide recommendations on the risk of a loan and borrower and it provides the amount of documentation needed to verify the risk.

== Manual underwriting ==
All loans are run through DU first. Loans that cannot be approved through DU are escalated for second-level review by a human underwriter to ensure no one is turned down who should get approved. However, guidelines for debt-to-income ratio are more conservative for manually underwritten loans, and few loans sent for second-level review are approved. There are also circumstances that DU cannot assess, and thus require a downgrade to manual underwriting. Mortgage underwriters will look for compensating factors for borrowers with recent late payments and high-risk levels. The ability to repay will be emphasized by mortgage underwriters.

It is important to remember that the approval and feedback is subject to the underwriter's review. It is also the responsibility of the underwriter to evaluate the aspects of the loan that is beyond the scope of automated underwriting. In short, it is the underwriter that approves the loan, not the automated underwriting.

On the other hand, automated underwriting has streamlined the mortgage process by providing analysis of credit and loan terms in minutes rather than days. For borrowers it reduces the amount of documentation needed and may even require no documentation of employment, income, assets or even value of the property. Automated underwriting tailors the amount of necessary documentation in proportion to the risk of the loan.

== Reduced documentation ==
Many banks also offer reduced documentation loans which allows a borrower to qualify for a mortgage without verifying items such as income or assets. Naturally these are higher risk loans and often come with higher interest rates. Because less documentation is provided on the capacity of the borrower, there is a high emphasis on the credit and collateral. To mitigate the risk of reduced documentation loans, lenders will often not lend to higher LTVs and limit the loans to smaller loan amounts, compared to loans that are fully documented.

== Approval decision ==
After reviewing all aspects of the loan, it is up to the underwriter to assess the risk of the loan as a whole. Each borrower and each loan is unique and many borrowers may not fit every guideline. However, certain aspects of the loan may compensate for the lack in other areas. For an example, the risk of high LTVs can be offset by the presence of a large amount of assets. Low LTVs can offset the fact that the borrower has a high debt to income ratio and excellent credit can overcome the lack of assets.

In addition to compensating factors, there is a concept known as layering of risk. For an example, if the property is a high rise condo, occupied as an investment, with a high LTV and a borrower who is self-employed, the cumulative effect of all these aspects yields higher risk. Though the borrower may meet all requirements under the guidelines of the loan program, the underwriter must exercise caution.

There is an old saying in lending: If your portfolio does not have one foreclosure, you are not accepting enough risk. Underwriters should review a loan from a holistic point of view; otherwise they may turn down a loan that is high risk in one aspect but low risk as a whole.

== IT systems ==
Banks generally use IT systems available from various vendors to record and analyze the information, and these systems have proliferated. Here's a primer on what many of them mean. These include the "loan origination system" (also called a loan operating system) (LOS) as well as other tools such as Fannie Mae and Freddie Mac's automated underwriting systems the "Desktop Underwriter" and "Loan Prospector".
