= Office of Federal Housing Enterprise Oversight =

Former United States federal agency

The Office of Federal Housing Enterprise Oversight (OFHEO) was an agency within the Department of Housing and Urban Development of the United States of America. It was charged with ensuring the capital adequacy and financial safety and soundness of two government sponsored enterprises—the Federal National Mortgage Association (Fannie Mae) and the Federal Home Loan Mortgage Corporation (Freddie Mac). It was established by the Federal Housing Enterprises Financial Safety and Soundness Act of 1992.

OFHEO was managed by a director, appointed by the president and ratified by the Senate. The final director was James B. Lockhart III, assuming the position during a time of crisis as acting director April 28, 2006, when nominated, confirmed to the post on June 15, and sworn in June 26, 2006. The previous Director was Armando Falcon, Jr, confirmed September 29, 1999, and forced to resign February 4, 2003, over the release of critical oversight reports However, the White House withdrew the nomination of his successor, and he served as director beyond the end of his term as provided by law.

On July 30, 2008, the Housing and Economic Recovery Act of 2008 combined OFHEO and the Federal Housing Finance Board (FHFB) to form the new Federal Housing Finance Agency (FHFA). OHFEO director James B. Lockhart III oversaw the agency at its conception, but departed after less than a year.

OFHEO also published the house price index.

== See also ==
- Title 12 of the Code of Federal Regulations
- Stephen Douglas Johnson
