= Maxine B. Baker =

American businesswoman

- Born: February 29, 1952 (age 74)
- Occupation: businessperson

Maxine B. Baker (born February 29, 1952) is an American businesswoman. She is senior vice president for Impact Programs at AARP. Baker served previously as vice president of corporate relations for the Federal Home Loan Mortgage Corporation (Freddie Mac) and president and CEO (1997–2012) of the Freddie Mac Foundation.

== Freddie Mac Foundation ==
Baker began her tenure as head of the Freddie Mac Foundation in 1997. From 1997 to 2003 the foundation assets increased from $22 million to $235 million. Baker also served as head of Freddie Mac's Community Relations department.

The Freddie Mac Foundation ended operation in 2016.
