= David M. Moffett =

American businessman

- Born: February 22, 1952 (age 74)
- Education: Oklahoma; Southern Methodist
- Occupations: Banker, executive

David McKenzie Moffett (born February 22, 1952) is an American businessman and was formerly the CEO of Freddie Mac. He was previously an executive with U.S. Bancorp. He also served as senior advisor to the Carlyle Group, and has been a director at eBay since July 2007. On March 2, 2009, Moffett announced his resignation as CEO of Freddie Mac.

He is currently on the board of directors of CSX, CIT Group, eBay, and Columbia Funds, while serving as the lead director of PayPal. He is an advisor to Bridgewater Associates.

== Career ==
Moffett holds a bachelor's degree from the University of Oklahoma and an MBA from Southern Methodist University. He joined Star Banc Corporation in 1993 as CFO, from Bank of America. He became CFO of Firstar Corporation when Firstar merged with Star Banc in 1998. In 2001, when Firstar merged with U.S. Bancorp and retained the U.S. Bancorp name, he became the company's Vice Chairman and CFO.

In 2007, Moffett retired from U.S. Bancorp. In September 2007, he was hired by the Carlyle Group to serve as senior advisor to their financial services group. From September 2008 to March 2009 Moffett served as CEO of Freddie Mac, receiving the job after the federal government took over the ailing company and ousted its leadership.
