= Jumbo mortgage =

Mortgage larger than is normally allowed

In the United States, a jumbo mortgage is a mortgage loan that may have high credit quality, but is in an amount above conventional conforming loan limits. This standard is set by the two government-sponsored enterprises (GSE), Fannie Mae and Freddie Mac, and sets the limit on the maximum value of any individual mortgage they will purchase from a lender. Fannie Mae (FNMA) and Freddie Mac (FHLMC) are large agencies that purchase the bulk of U.S. residential mortgages from banks and other lenders, allowing them to free up liquidity to lend more mortgages. When FNMA and FHLMC limits don't cover the full loan amount, the loan is referred to as a "jumbo mortgage". Traditionally, the interest rates on jumbo mortgages are higher than for conforming mortgages, however with GSE fees increasing, Jumbo loans have recently seen lower interest rates than conforming loans.

== History ==
On February 13, 2008, President George W. Bush signed the Housing and Economic Recovery Act of 2008 (Pub. L. 110–289 (text) (PDF), 122 Stat. 2654, enacted July 30, 2008), which temporarily increased the jumbo conforming limit in the United States. The limit was raised to $729,750 or 125% of the median home value within the metropolitan statistical area, whichever is the lesser. Initially due to expire in December 2008, the new limits were extended through 2010. Mortgage lenders did not freely adopt these new limits, making them essentially "theoretical," as mortgages above the old conforming limit of $417,000 still attracted higher interest rates.

As of 2010, the limit on a conforming loan in "general" areas was $417,000 for most of the US, apart from Alaska, Hawaii, Guam, and the U.S. Virgin Islands, where the limit was $625,500. The limit in "high cost" areas was $729,750 and $938,250, respectively.

On October 1, 2011, the jumbo conforming limit of $729,750 in "high cost" areas was reduced to $625,500.

On November 28, 2017, the US Federal Housing Finance Agency (FHFA) announced that the ceiling loan limit for one-unit properties in most high-cost areas will be $679,650 — or 150 percent of $453,100.

== Risk ==
A mortgage broker is an intermediary between a lender and a borrower. Jumbo mortgage loans are a higher risk for lenders, mainly due to their larger size rather than credit quality. This is because if a jumbo mortgage loan defaults, it may be harder to sell a luxury residence quickly for full price. Luxury prices are more vulnerable to market highs and lows in some cases. That is one reason lenders prefer to have a higher down payment from jumbo loan seekers. Jumbo home prices can be more subjective and not as easily sold to a mainstream borrower, therefore many lenders may require two appraisals on a jumbo mortgage loan.

== Costs ==
The interest rate charged on jumbo mortgage loans is generally higher than a loan that is conforming, due to the higher risk to the lender. The spread, or difference between the two rates, depends on the current market price of risk. While typically the spread fluctuates between 0.25 and 0.5%, at times of high investor anxiety, such as August 2007, it can exceed one and a half percentage points. It can be more expensive to refinance a jumbo loan due to the closing costs. Some lenders will offer the service of an extension and consolidation agreement, so that a jumbo refinancer will not have to pay for mortgage tax again on the same principal balance. In other cases, title insurance companies will offer up to a 50% discount, often required by law for those refinancing within 1 year to 10 years. The largest discount is for refinancing within one year.

== Role in US housing bubble ==
As house prices rose as part of the United States housing bubble, there was a large increase in the number of jumbo loan applicants. Due to rising prices, many consumers had to take out jumbo mortgages in order to buy modest homes in big-city areas; this option was no longer limited to high-end luxury residences.

Many of these new loans were 40- or 50-year amortization, or had an interest-only option, similar to subprime loans. That meant that the jumbo loan borrower would pay the loan back over a longer period of time, or could defer any repayment of principal for a few years (thereby also increasing the total amount to be paid back). However from 2007, as prices fell and the number of foreclosures rose, lenders turned away from providing jumbo mortgages. Lenders that did remain in the jumbo loan market increased rates sharply, with rates up to 1.5 percentage points higher than for conforming loans. This withdrawal from the market led to a lack of lending available to fund the purchases of expensive homes, thus putting further downward pressure on house prices and completing a vicious circle.

The delinquency rate on jumbo loans rose dramatically, tripling over the course of 2009, and by February 2010, almost one in ten jumbo mortgages were 'seriously delinquent' (i.e. in arrears by at least 60 days).

== See also ==
- Affordable housing in the United States
- Housing crisis
- Housing discrimination in the United States
- Super jumbo mortgage
