= HelioPower =

Energy corporation

HelioPower, Inc.
- Type: Private Company
- Industry: Energy production, Energy Management, Renewable energy, energy storage
- Founded: Fallbrook, California, U.S.
- Founder: Maurice Rousso
- Headquarters: 43397 Business Park Dr, Temecula, California, 92590, U.S.
- Number of locations: 1 (2018)
- Key people: Maurice Rousso (Chairman); Brad Schmehl (President)
- Number of employees: 50 (2018)

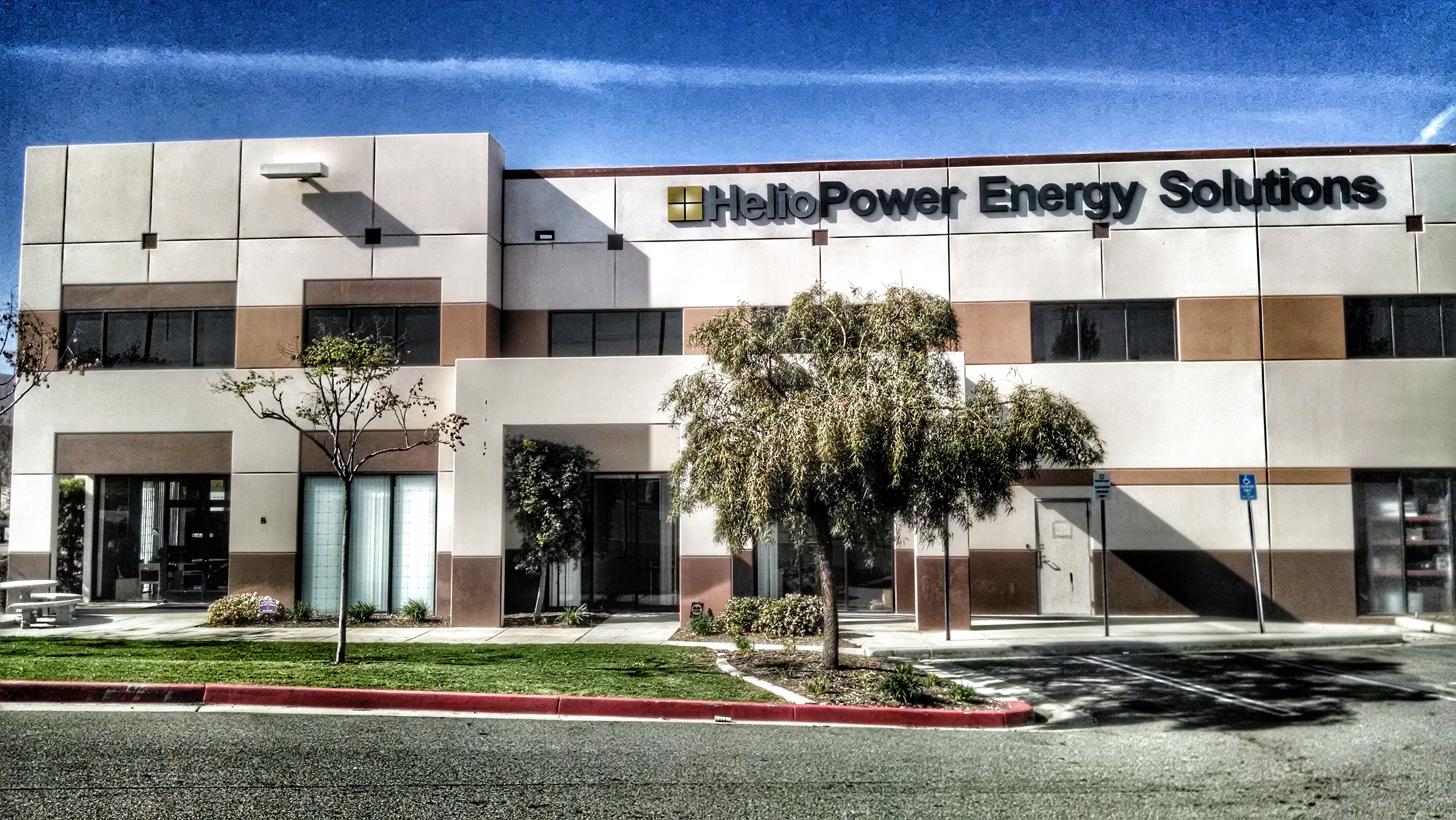
HelioPower, Inc. headquarters in Murrieta, CA

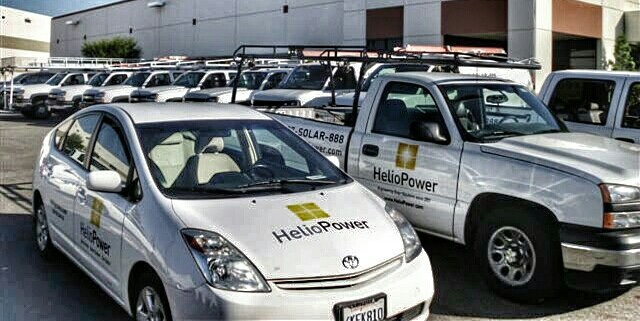
HelioPower, Inc.'s installation trucks & company vehicles

Heliopower, Inc. was a United States–based company founded in 2001. HelioPower developed proprietary projects with third-party off-takers and currently owns and operates more than 100 energy systems at facilities such as the Tech Museum of Innovation in San Jose and Ronald McDonald House in San Diego. Following its emergence from Chapter 11 bankruptcy in 2017, the company struggled to maintain profitability and eventually ceased operations in 2021.

== Products and services ==
HelioPower operates six business lines:

1. Residential solar
2. Energy analytics
3. Engineering, procurement and construction (EPC) for distributed energy projects and facility improvements
4. Energy project finance and advisory services
5. Energy asset management including Operations & Maintenance (O&M) services
6. PredictEnergy,™ an energy analytics software platform

=== Residential Solar ===
In 2013, HelioPower was ranked among the top 10 solar installers in California and had installed over 4,000 residential solar voltaic PV systems across California and Nevada. They offer direct-to-customer or direct-to-partner services. Direct-to-customer services include complimentary energy audits, energy efficiency upgrades, and solar systems. HelioPower offers numerous residential financing options including leases and power purchase agreements, utility rebate programs, PACE financing programs including the HERO program, and State and Federal energy incentives.

Direct-to-partner services include full EPC offerings as well as third-party financing for qualified partners.

=== Energy Analytics ===
Energy analytics synthesizes three distinct but inter-related pieces of information: (1) How much energy and power a business uses, and when and where it's used; (2) what a business makes, moves or stores; where it performs this work, when it performs this work, and how this work changes and scales; and, (3) what a business pays, and how it procures, energy and power. HelioPower provides energy analytics consulting services to the water/waste-water, manufacturing and distribution industries.

=== Engineering, Procurement, & Construction (EPC) ===
HelioPower offers turnkey EPC solutions including solar PV, energy storage and facility improvement measures, and systems integration solutions including CHP and bio-mass. HelioPower also decouples its EPC capabilities and offers discrete engineering, procurement and construction services to end users and industry partners. HelioPower has performed engineering and construction management services throughout the US and worldwide.

HelioPower operates with a structured project planning and control (PP&C) methodology based on PMI's (the Project Management Institute) PMBOK.

=== Energy Project Finance & Advisory Services ===
HelioPower raises and syndicates project finance for proprietary and third-party energy projects and provides financing options for all its customer segments. Offerings include power purchase agreements (PPA), leases, and/or subsidised energy loans. All financing products are structured to lower the overall energy cost and significantly reduce or eliminate the upfront cost of purchasing an energy system. HelioPower also offers energy finance advisory services for avoided-cost analyses, project modelling, project placement, and best-fit analyses.

=== Asset Management Including Operations & Maintenance (O&M) ===
In addition to distributed generation asset management, HelioPower provides operations and maintenance services specifically for solar assets, battery backup systems, off-grid systems and solar manufacturer warranty and after-market support. HelioPower's asset management capabilities grew out of its proprietary portfolio of distributed generation assets. HelioPower currently manages over 20 megawatts of commercial and industrial sector solar assets.

=== PredictEnergy Energy Analytics Software ===
Predict Energy is a cloud-based commercial and industrial energy analytics software platform that tracks, analyzes and predicts energy cost and energy intensity based on three dimensions:

1. Energy Intensity – energy and power by date, time and location
2. Business performance – production, distribution or processing volume by date, time and location
3. Cost structure – electric utility tariff, distributed generation, work rules and demand response impact

The PredictEnergy software platform is specifically designed to address energy intensity in the manufacturing, distribution, and water/waste-water industries.

== Locations ==
HelioPower, Inc. was founded in Fallbrook, California. Since 2007, HelioPower has been headquartered in Murrieta, California. HelioPower has the following additional locations: San Diego County, San Francisco, Concord, and Coachella Valley, California, as well as Incline Village, Nevada. This strategic coverage allows HelioPower the ability to service residential and commercial customers in California statewide.

== Helio Micro Utility and Acquisition of Greenzu, Inc. ==
In 2007 HelioPower spun out Helio Micro-Utility to provide specialized project finance services to energy investors, financial institutions, and end-users In 2008, Helio Micro-Utility developed the Helio Green Energy Fund with CitiBank for non-profit corporations and affordable housing communities. On August 20, 2013, HelioPower officially acquired Greenzu, Inc., a national provider of solar finance solutions for commercial and non-profit customers. The acquisition expanded HelioPower's suite of energy financing products.

== See also ==
- Efficient energy use
- Index of solar energy articles
- List of energy storage projects
- Outline of energy
- Solar power
- Solar power in California
