= Redevelopment =

New construction on a site that has preexisting uses

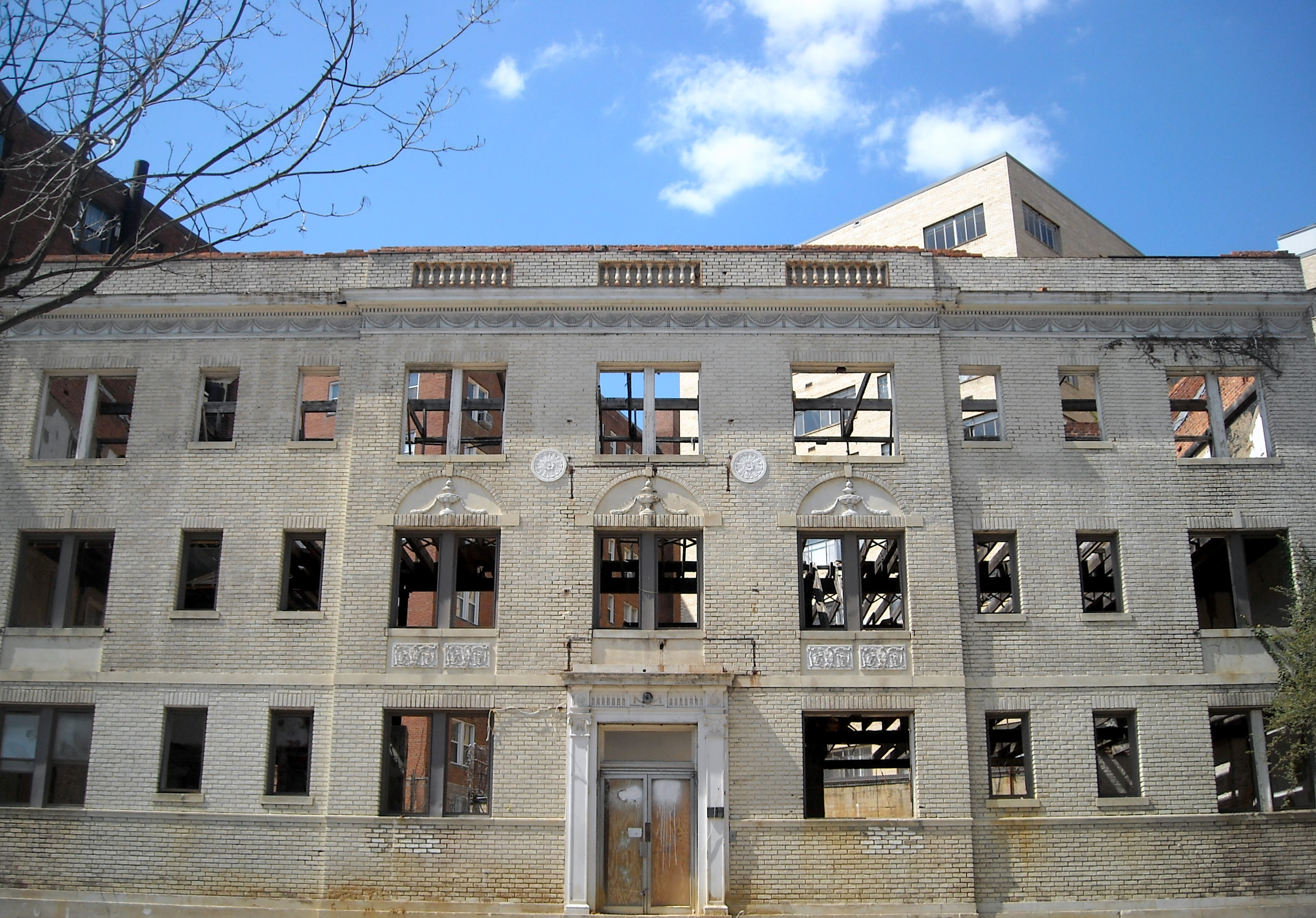
An abandoned building in Washington, D.C. being converted into luxury condominiums

Redevelopment is any new construction on a site that has pre-existing uses. It represents a process of land development uses to revitalize the physical, economic and social fabric of urban space.

== Description ==
Variations on redevelopment include:

- Urban infill on vacant parcels that have no existing activity but were previously developed, especially on brownfield land, such as the redevelopment of an industrial site into a mixed-use development.
- Constructing with a denser land usage, such as the redevelopment of a block of townhouses into a large apartment building.
- Adaptive reuse, where older structures are converted for improved current market use, such as an industrial mill into housing lofts.

Redevelopment projects can be small or large ranging from a single building to entire new neighborhoods or "new town in town" projects.

Redevelopment also refers to state and federal statutes which give cities and counties the authority to establish redevelopment agencies and give the agencies the authority to attack problems of urban decay. The fundamental tools of a redevelopment agency include the authority to acquire real property, the power of eminent domain, to develop and sell property without bidding and the authority and responsibility of relocating persons who have interests in the property acquired by the agency. The financing/funding of such operations might come from government grants, borrowing from federal or state governments and selling bonds and from tax increment financing.

Other terms sometimes used to describe redevelopment include urban renewal (urban revitalization). While efforts described as urban revitalization often involve redevelopment, they do not always involve redevelopment as they do not always involve the demolition of any existing structures but may instead describe the rehabilitation of existing buildings or other neighborhood improvement initiatives.

A new example of other neighborhood improvement initiatives is the funding mechanism associated with high carbon footprint air quality urban blight. Assembly Bill AB811 is the State of California's answer to funding renewable energy and allows cities to craft their own sustainability action plans. These cutting edge action plans needs the funding structure; which can easily come forward through redevelopment funding.

== Urban renewal ==
Some redevelopment projects and programs have been incredibly controversial including the urban renewal program in the United States in the mid-twentieth century or the urban regeneration program in Great Britain. Controversy usually results either from the use of eminent domain, from objections to the change in use or increases in density and intensity on the site or from disagreement on the appropriate use of taxpayer funds to pay for some element of the project. Urban redevelopment in the United States has been controversial because it can displace poor and lower middle class residents, often transferring residents' land and homes to developers for free or a below-market-value price. This is done on the condition that the developer will use that land to construct new commercial and residential developments.

The residents displaced by redevelopment are often undercompensated, and some (notably month-to-month tenants and business owners) are not compensated at all. Historically, redevelopment agencies have been buying many properties in redevelopment areas for prices below fair market value, or even below the agencies' own appraisal figures because the displaced people are often unaware of their legal rights and lack the will and the funds to mount a proper legal defense in a valuation trial. Those who do so usually recover more in compensation than what is offered by the redevelopment agencies.

The controversy over misuse of eminent domain for redevelopment reached a climax in the wake of the U.S. Supreme Court's 2005 decision in Kelo v. City of New London, which ruled that the general benefits a community enjoyed from economic growth qualified private redevelopment plans as a permissible "public use" under the Takings Clause of the Fifth Amendment. The Kelo decision was widely denounced and remains the subject of severe criticism. Remedial legislation to restrict the use of eminent domain for private development has been enacted or introduced in a number of states.

== Golf course redevelopment ==
Golf course redevelopment, also known as golf course conversion, is a real estate niche, in which investors purchase failing golf courses. Investors then subdivide the golf course into individual plots of lands. They then resell the plots of land for builders, or build on the plots then resell it to residential home buyers. This process is usually done with the assistance of a real estate broker.

The main challenge of this niche is the difficulties that investors face in requesting a variance from cities.

== Notable examples ==
North America:

- Atlantic Station, Atlanta, Georgia
- Atlantic Yards, Brooklyn, New York
- American Tobacco Historic District, Durham, North Carolina
- CFB Downsview -> Downsview Park, Toronto, Ontario
- CFB Griesbach -> Griesbach, Edmonton, Alberta
- CN rail yard -> Station Lands (Edmonton), MacEwan University, Edmonton downtown arena; Edmonton, Alberta
- Edmonton City Centre (Blatchford Field) Airport -> Blatchford, Edmonton, Alberta
- HOPE VI
- Hudson Yards, New York, New York
- Lincoln Center for the Performing Arts, New York, New York
- Midtown Detroit, Michigan
- Mission Bay, Treasure Island, Western Addition, and the part of South of Market that become Moscone Center and Yerba Buena Gardens in San Francisco, California
- Pearl District, Portland, Oregon
- New Stadium at RFK Campus, Washington, D.C.
- Old Port of Montreal, Quebec
- Downtown San Diego, California
- Central Park, Denver, Colorado, on a former airport site
- Toronto Waterfront, Toronto, Canada
- West End, Boston, Massachusetts
- World Trade Center site in Lower Manhattan following the September 11 attacks

Europe:

- Canary Wharf, London (UK)
- Edinburgh Waterfront, UK
- Redevelopment of Norrmalm (Sweden)
- Liverpool One, Liverpool (UK)
- Greenwich Millennium Village, London (UK)
- Tigné Point, Sliema (Malta)
- Porta Nuova, Milan (Italy)

Asia:

- Taichung's seventh Redevelopment Zone, Taichung, Taiwan
- Beijing Olympic Village, Beijing, China
- Sheung Wan, Hong Kong, China

Central America:

- Panama in Casco Antiguo (Casco Viejo)

== See also ==
- Community development
- Community redevelopment agency
- Megaproject
- Land use conflict
- Business improvement district
- Sustainable redevelopment
