= California v. Federal Housing Finance Agency =

American lawsuit

People of the State of California v. Federal Housing Finance Agency
- Court: United States District Court for the Northern District of California
- Full case name: People of the State of California, ex rel. v. Federal Housing Finance Agency

Court membership
- Judge sitting: Claudia Wilken

People of the State of California v. Federal Housing Finance Agency was a California state case in which several California-based plaintiffs filed suit against the Federal Housing Finance Agency (FHFA) for creating a lending rule that impeded the Property Assessed Clean Energy (PACE) program, a program in which property owners repay energy-related property improvements gradually over time (typically 15–20 years) as an addition to their property tax.

== Background ==
Property Assessed Clean Energy (PACE) programs are local government initiatives that pay for up-front costs of energy efficiency and renewable energy projects on a property. The property owner pays back these costs over time (up to 20 years) as an addition to their residential or commercial property tax. The tax remains a part of the property and is transferred from owner to owner until the upgrade costs are paid off. There are little to no up-front costs for the property owner and an average homeowner will save more money on their monthly utility bill than the increase in their property tax bill.

The City of Berkeley's Financing Initiative for Renewable and Solar Technology (FIRST) program, which was adopted in 2008, was an early example of how PACE programs could help eliminate many financial hurdles facing property owners eager to install solar panels on their homes. Following the success of the Berkeley FIRST program, several other local governments in California (e.g., City of Palm Desert, City of San Diego, and Sonoma County) followed suit and the state passed Assembly Bill 811 to allow any local government to implement PACE-type programs. Since 2008, PACE has been adopted by 27 other states.

PACE programs, like all other municipal assessments, require a lien to be placed on the mortgage payment in the event of a default. Due to the recent mortgage crisis, lenders Fannie Mae and Freddie Mac were hesitant to offer loans associated with PACE programs for fear of potential risk. The FHFA backed the lenders’ claims and issued a statement in 2010, putting a halt to PACE programs nationwide.

The statement issued in 2010, also known as 'Directives', indicated FHFA's concerns towards energy retrofit lending programs. The FHFA determined that the PACE program presented "significant safety and soundness concerns" because of inherent characteristics of the lending program. The FHFA believed that these types of loans would be difficult to manage due to the size and duration of PACE loans, would present significant risk to lenders due to "key alteration[s] of traditional mortgage lending practices", and would result in collateral-based lending based on uncertain reductions from energy retrofits.

In California, the Attorney General filed suit, quickly followed by Sonoma and Placer County, the Sierra Club, and the City of Palm Desert. All four cases have been consolidated.

== Parties ==
The plaintiffs are the People of the State of California (represented by Attorney General Kamala Harris; originally Edmund G. Brown Jr. in 2010), Sonoma and Placer Counties, the Sierra Club and the City of Palm Desert.

The defendants are the Federal Housing Finance Agency (represented by Acting Director Edward DeMarco), the Federal Home Loan Mortgage Corporation (represented by chief executive officer Charles E. Haldeman Jr.), and the Federal National Mortgage Association (represented by chief executive officer Michael J. Williams).

== Issues and arguments ==
In order to invoke the court's jurisdiction, the plaintiffs must prove that they have constitutional ‘standing’. As such, the three elements required to satisfy Article III Standing are (1) injury in fact, (2) causation, and (3) redressability. The Plaintiffs argue that their ‘injuries in fact’ include: interference with state, county, and city PACE law; lost opportunities for participation in PACE programs; lost opportunities to reduce the effects of climate change. With regards to causation and redressability, the plaintiffs argue that the FHFA decision failed to undergo the proper procedure of identifying environmental considerations.

The Plaintiffs also argue that the FHFA's anti-PACE directives violate the Administrative Procedure Act (APA) notice-and-comment requirements, 5 U.S.C. section 553. The Plaintiffs allege that the Directives issued in 2010 serve as FHFA's regulations and “final agency action,” not mere guidance because they reflected a change from previous policy. Therefore, the Plaintiffs assert that the FHFA is required to follow the APA's requirements and give notice of the Directives or provide a formal public comment period. In other words, the FHFA created law without undergoing the proper procedures. Therefore, failure to follow APA requirements empowers the court to vacate the directives or to instruct the FHFA to follow proper APA procedure. Another contention is that FHFA is overreaching its power as Conservator. The Plaintiffs argue that Congress never explicitly granted the FHFA substantive rule-making power.

According to the Plaintiffs, the FHFA also violated the APA because the Directives were arbitrary and capricious due to FHFA's failure to provide substantial evidence of ‘risk,’ failure to consider existing data from PACE programs, and failure to consider alternative measures prior to a blanket prohibition on PACE.

If the court finds that the Agency did not violate the APA, the Plaintiffs then argue that the FHFA violates the National Environmental Policy Act (NEPA) for failure to take a “hard look” at the impacts resulting from action or inaction of the FHFA due to the Directives. NEPA requires preparation of an environmental assessment, or environmental impact statement, prior to major federal action that would significantly affect the quality of the human environment.

The Defendants argue that the Directives issued in 2010 are to serve as guidelines, not regulations, and therefore not subject to APA requirements. In addition, according to their charter, as Conservator, the FHFA is obligated to take any action to provide a safe and sound housing market. Furthermore, the FHFA argues that Congress intended for the Conservator to be able to take action without interference from any state or federal agency, or court. The main issue, as argued by the Defendants, is that PACE loans are characteristically ‘risky’ due to the additional costs for home-owners. The Defendants contend that these loans increase the burden on home-owners, thereby creating a likelihood for the home-owner to default. And because PACE loans acquire priority lien, they take precedence over mortgage liens.

The Defendants also requested for dismissal of the Plaintiffs’ claims, for failure to state a claim. In other words, the Defendants allege that the Plaintiffs only offered speculative claims rather than legitimate contentions. The Defendants allege that the court lacks jurisdiction over plaintiffs’ claims because the FHFA acted within its powers as granted by Congress. In addition, the relief sought by Plaintiffs would restrain and severely hinder FHFA's purpose of preserving and conserving the assets and property of the lenders, Fannie Mae and Freddie Mac.

The Defendants argue protection under federal preemption because federal law preempts state-law. In addition, the FHFA argues that the Housing and Economic Recovery Act of 2008 (HERA) intended to delegate authority for the purpose of providing a safe and sound housing market. The Defendants allege that if states were able to impose PACE first-lien mortgages, these mortgages would undermine the effectiveness of the FHFA because of the lack of uniformity.

Furthermore, the Defendants argue that the Plaintiffs’ APA claims fail because the FHFA was not created to protect environmental interests. As stated in the charters for Fannie Mae and Freddie Mac, they were created to ensure the safe and sound operation of the mortgage markets. With the absence of APA jurisdiction, the Defendants argue for dismissal of the Plaintiffs’ NEPA claims. The Defendants assert that NEPA does not contain a private right of action, and therefore are reviewable if jurisdiction exists. However, the court does not have jurisdiction under APA, and therefore does not have jurisdiction under NEPA. In addition, in response to the Plaintiffs’ claim of violation of NEPA, the Defendants assert that the Directives issued in 2010 did not require that municipalities shut down their PACE programs, thus maintaining that the Directives were not a federal regulation.

== Court decision ==
Judge Claudia Wilken denied the defendants' motion to dismiss the case on August 26, 2011, and on September 13, 2011, issued a preliminary injunction requiring FHFA to begin rulemaking on PACE. FHFA issued an Advanced Notice of Proposed Rulemaking (ANPR) on January 26, 2012, with public comments due by March 26, 2012. The plaintiffs filed for a motion of summary judgement to be heard on May 3, 2012.

== Other PACE litigation ==
In the State of New York, the Town of Babylon and the Natural Resources Defense Council (NRDC) filed separate cases against the FHFA. Both cases are to be heard in tandem in June 2012.

In the State of Florida, Leon County filed suit against FHFA. As of May 2012, no hearing date has been set.
