= Sustainable redevelopment =

Sustainable redevelopment is the doctrine within which a state, organization, or individual can work to recreate a socio-economic position attained prior to a deconstructive event while upholding sustainable and environmental practices. The doctrine is based on economics within environmentalism. Typically, by providing more upfront capital, one can create a system that is less energy intensive, less wasteful, and generally less expensive to maintain in the long run. By redeveloping sustainably, long term energy efficiencies can be realized, coupled with highly reduced greenhouse gas emissions.

Within the ideals of nation-building, sustainable redevelopment can take up a greater significance. Post-disaster countries are in a unique situation to deal with these systems of ideals. Within this context, the idea behind initiating post-trauma sustainable redevelopment is that the underlying infrastructure is destroyed or damaged, therefore the situation is ideal for realizing the opportunities inherent to the situation.

== Background ==
Sustainable development and redevelopment are closely linked, and several organizations have been implicitly involved with sustainable development. This type of development, in contrast to redevelopment, is not different other than the application to a specified problem. Sustainable development, is a form of development that coexists with existing forms of development.

While the systems for recreation on a small/local level are not universally widespread, there are several institutions which engage in sustainable development, that can theoretically be carried over to redevelopment. The Kyoto Protocol's 12th Article speaks to "flexible mechanisms". These mechanisms allow countries which have ratified the Kyoto Protocol to lower their overall emissions through the most economical means, respective, of course, to that country. Theoretically, these mechanisms could be directed towards post-traumatic redevelopment.

== UN ==
The United Nations Division for Sustainable Development "provides leadership and is an authoritative source of expertise within the United Nations system on sustainable development". The Division for Sustainable Development has been essential in the creation of such policies as Agenda 21, and the Johannesburg Plan of Implementation.

The United Nations declares that "Sustainable reconstruction management provides numerous environmental, safety and financial benefits."

== World Bank ==
The World Bank has been working on sustainable development projects through one of their internal groups, the Sustainable Development Network. These two groups work together to provide key sectors for sustainable development: "agriculture and rural development, energy, transport, water, environment, urban development, social development, oil, gas, mining, and chemicals, information and communication technologies, and sub-national activities".

== The Natural Hazards Institute ==
The Natural Hazards Research and Application Information Center of the University of Colorado at Boulder produced a work catalyzing the process for post-disaster sustainable redevelopment. In their book, “Holistic Disaster Recovery”, is spelled out the “Six Principles of Sustainability”

== The Six Principles of Sustainability ==
1. Maintain and, if possible, enhance, its residents quality of life. 2. Enhance local economic vitality. 3. Ensure social and intergenerational equity. 4. Maintain and, if possible, enhance, environmental quality. 5. Incorporate disaster resilience and mitigation. 6. Use a consensus-building, participatory process when making decisions
