= Solar bonds =

Solar bonds are municipal revenue bonds issued to provide low-interest financing for lower-cost accelerated development of local renewable energy technologies such as solar power.

== History ==
The first solar bond authority was drafted by Paul Douglas Fenn, creator of Community Choice Aggregation, and approved by San Francisco, California voters in 2001. Under "solar neighborhoods" approach, municipal governments would enter into multi-decade community-wide power purchase agreements with competitive suppliers and issue solar bonds, or "H Bonds", to finance the new supplier's rollout of local renewable energy and energy efficiency measures, offering municipal bond financing to residents and businesses, the debt for which would be repaid on monthly electric bills - an approach that has come to be called "on-bill financing."

The City of San Francisco enshrined solar bonds in its Community Choice Aggregation program in 2004 when it adopted an ordinance combining the City's authority to procure power for its residents and businesses with its authority to issue revenue bonds under the solar bond authority. Fenn drafted the ordinance (86-04, 2004) for sponsoring supervisor Tom Ammiano, who had also sponsored placing the solar bond authority on the 2001 ballot, and Fenn's company, Local Power Inc., went on to draft a 2007 implementation plan and 2013 business model to implement the $1 billion project. Local Power also contributed substantially to Sonoma county's Sonoma Clean Power program which has a similar structure.

Apart from creating a new "CCA 2.0" generation of Community Choice Aggregations, San Francisco's solar bond authority spawned the subsequent appearance of both public and private financing of customer-owned solar and energy efficiency measures, including PACE financing and the solar power purchase agreement or PPA, transforming the photovoltaics industry in the United States. By 2026 California CCA 2.0 programs had committed or built $50B of new mostly in-state renewable energy projects, $25B financed by solar bonds.

As of 2024, California CCA 2.0 programs built over 20,000 MW of new in-state renewables, causing massive climate benefits - over $35 B of investments committed including $15B in Green Bonds - becoming the largest issuer of Green Bonds in the US (larger than China or Canada).
