= Deep energy retrofit =

Energy saving project for existing buildings

A deep energy retrofit (DER) is an energy conservation project in an existing building that leads to an overall improvement in building performance. While there is no exact definition for a deep energy retrofit, it can be characterized as a whole-building analysis and construction process that aims to reduce on-site energy use by 50% or more using existing technologies, materials and construction practices. Reductions are calculated against baseline energy use using data from utility bills. Such a retrofit reaps multifold (energy and non-energy) benefits beyond energy cost savings, unlike conventional energy retrofit. It may also involve remodeling the building to achieve a harmony in energy, indoor air quality, durability, and thermal comfort. An integrated project delivery method is recommended for a deep energy retrofit project. An over-time approach in a deep energy retrofitting project provides a solution to the large upfront costs problem in all-at-once execution of the project.

A deep energy retrofit is a whole-building analysis and construction process that achieves much larger energy savings than conventional energy retrofits. Deep energy retrofits can be applied to both residential and non-residential ("commercial") buildings. A deep energy retrofit typically results in energy savings of 30 percent or more, perhaps spread over several years, and may significantly improve the building value.

== Climate Change ==
82% of final energy consumption in buildings was supplied by fossil fuels in 2015. The energy-related CO_{2} emissions account for the environmental impact due to a building. The Global Status Report 2017 prepared by the International Energy Agency (IEA) for the Global Alliance for Buildings and Construction (GABC) highlights the significance of the buildings and construction sector in global energy consumption and related emissions again. Deep energy retrofits will assist in achieving the global climate goals laid down in the Paris Agreement.

== Deep energy retrofits vs. Conventional energy retrofits ==
Conventional energy retrofits focus on isolated system upgrades (i.e. lighting and (HVAC) Heating, ventilation, and air conditioning equipment). While these retrofits are generally simple, fast and comparatively inexpensive, deep energy retrofits, while expensive, replace systems to be more energy efficient.

Deep energy retrofits require a systems-thinking approach compared to the traditional approach followed for a conventional retrofit – home weatherization or typical home performance upgrade. Systems thinking evaluates the interactions between the different isolated components in the building. For example, Home Performance with ENERGY STAR offers a comprehensive, whole-house approach to improving a home's energy efficiency, comfort and safety while helping to reduce the energy costs by up to 20%. In addition to the efficiency measures taken for a building, a deep energy retrofit requires occupants' proactive role in energy conservation. This approach usually takes into account all the energy uses in the home, as well as the activities of the occupants.

Deep energy retrofits achieve greater energy efficiency by taking a whole-building approach, addressing many systems at once. It is usually more economical and convenient to take this approach on buildings with overall poor efficiency performance, with multiple systems nearing the end of useful life, and perhaps other reasons.

=== Occupant behavior ===
The overall success of the deep energy retrofit project can depend upon the inclusion of occupants in all the phases of the project. The phases include – project recruitment, project planning and use. Occupant behavior requires the project to focus on building owners' needs and wants as much as the technical specifications. This ascertains actual performance, cost-effectiveness, willingness to progress from a design to an actual implementation, and occupant satisfaction. Also, evidence suggests that building simulation models can become more accurate for a given structure when actual operational information, such as thermostat set-points, appliance usage, etc. are included.

In Europe, for funding for retrofitting, there are unique European Union bank initiatives that offer funds or help, including the Joint European Support for Sustainable Investment in City Areas initiative and the European Local Energy Assistance (ELENA) project.

=== Over-time Retrofit ===
Over-time retrofit is the implementation of a retrofit project which is planned in a step-by-step manner at intervals of time within a stipulated duration. Such an approach is usually sought for deep energy retrofits over an all-at-once approach to reduce the burden of large upfront costs. Thus, an over-time retrofit can be a more viable option when there are capital constraints. Research in the United Kingdom has demonstrated that retrofits carried out over-time can achieve levels of home performance equal to those achieved by all-at-once DERs and select projects have been successful in the United States. The pros and cons of an over-time retrofit are compared as follows:

Over-time Retrofit
Potential benefits	Potential downsides
Less perceived disruption, because it is spread out over-time.	More numerous small disruptions.
More likely that occupants can continue to inhabit their home continuously, without any need for alternative accommodations.	Difficult to finance traditionally.
Costs are spread over-time, allowing owners to build up savings between phases.	Costs may be higher, due to repeated fees and fixed costs, such as permitting, inspection and construction labor.
Introduce occupants to the benefits of energy upgrades, thus feeding their desire for further improvements and refinements.	Possible need to reinvest in measures that are inadequately addressed, due to a lack of careful and detailed planning.
More aligned with making incremental deep green improvements, as maintenance and equipment replacement require.	Lower aggregate energy savings and reduction in environmental footprint.
Over-time process can inform occupants of the effects of their behaviors, and the potential for behavior modification to reduce energy use and project costs (through use of human effort rather than technology to achieve savings).	Difficult for occupants to delay the gratification of investing in glamorous efficiency measures (such as solar PV or windows), by first investing in the invisibles (insulation and airsealing).

For example, an overtime retrofit project could be able to stipulate the occupants' need but could perform sub-optimal technically. It could also prove to be costlier. There is a lack of tools to execute over-time projects efficiently.

==== Strategies to increase success ====
Detailed planning must be inculcated from the beginning. It is recommended to include post-occupancy evaluation at each stage of implementation to deal with modifications required in future stages. Home performance should be tracked at each stage using utility bills or feedback devices. This helps in achieving the set-target for energy consumption. It must be kept in mind to implement building envelope and passive design elements before making major heating, ventilation, and air conditioning (HVAC) and technology investments. This will help to reduce the load parameters for heating, ventilation, and air conditioning (HVAC) design. The technology investments should also come later to have an innovation advantage. Over-time retrofits can be guided by these strategies to be successful.

=== Design and Construction Process ===
Deep energy retrofit projects have different phases governing them – pre-panning, project planning, construction, and test out. For the design and construction process, a set of defined project needs, opportunities, goals and objectives should be created. This determines the overall project. Walker et al. provide design and construction process guidance which can be followed flexibly in deep energy retrofit projects in residential homes.

Design and Construction Phases
1	Pre-Planning Phase
1.1	Establish and clarify the project needs, opportunities, goals and objectives
1.2	Establish a performance baseline
1.2.1	Perform home inspection and energy audit
1.2.2	Identify Healthy Homes health and safety issues
1.2.3	Establish energy baseline using utility bill analysis
1.3	Develop project goals and performance metrics
1.3.1	Establish an annual performance target or energy reduction goal
1.3.2	Establish metrics to be used in assessing progress towards project goals
1.3.3	Establish non-energy goals of the project
2	Project Planning Phase
2.1	The design team
2.1.1	Assemble qualified and trusted team
2.1.2	Planning approaches
2.1.2.1	Plan all aspects of the project as if it were new construction
2.1.2.2	Systems integrated approaches
2.1.2.3	Design to the energy reduction goal or target
2.1.2.4	An integrated project delivery method
2.1.2.5	Use energy models
3	Construction Phase
3.1	Plan product procurement for a DER as for any remodel
3.2	Be prepared for unexpected issues to arise
3.3	Provide quality assurance wherever possible
4	Test Out
4.1	Verify installation and performance of retrofit measures
4.2	Commission all building systems
5	Post-Occupancy Evaluation
5.1	Provide post-occupancy performance feedback to occupants
5.2	Encourage occupants to make acceptable behavioral adjustments
5.3	Guide occupants using short-term usage targets

== Energy efficiency measures ==
Cluett and Amann (2014) found the most commonly implemented efficiency measures in the US for residential buildings. They are broadly listed as follows.

=== Building shell improvements ===
- Insulation improvements, usually to the foundation walls/slabs, above grade walls, floors, roof, and attic surfaces that make up the thermal envelope
- Attention to air sealing, particularly in areas that are harder to address without being paired with improvements to the insulation shell

=== Upgrades to heating, cooling, and hot water systems ===
- Upgrade to non-atmospheric vented combustion units that either vent directly outside or are electric only
- Upgrade to units that are correctly sized for the heating and cooling load demands of an altered building
- Improvement to or replacement of the existing distribution systems for heating, cooling, and/or hot water, including changes to ductwork, water piping, and wastewater heat recovery

The deep energy retrofit specifications for various elements vary from climate to climate zones.

== Process ==
A Level III energy audit, as defined by ASHRAE, is required in order to complete a commercial building deep energy retrofit. Also known as an investment grade audit, this type of energy audit features analysis of the interactions between efficiency strategies and their life cycle cost. Upon selection and implementation of measures, the energy savings are verified using the International Performance Measurement and Verification Protocol.

== Tools ==
Deep energy retrofits make use of energy modelling tools that integrate with an organization's pro forma or other financial decision making mechanisms. Smartphone technologies have simplified the retrofit process as a number of audit and retrofit tools have appeared over the last several years to speed up retrofits and maximize efficiency in the field.

== Ratings ==
A building that has undergone a deep energy retrofit is usually well positioned for a green building rating such as LEED.

== Energy and Non-energy Benefits ==
There have been a number of studies to determine and quantify the benefits afforded to owners, tenants, and various other stakeholders from the successful completion of deep energy retrofits. The following tabulation by the Rocky Mountain Institute lays the efficiency measures undertaken in a deep energy retrofit project in correspondence to the building performance improvements and therefore, the quantifiable and non-quantifiable values generated from implementation of such a project.

Sr No.	Deep Energy Retrofit Efficiency Measure		Building Performance	Value	
1	Envelope	Insulation; Windows; Air tightness; Green/white roof	Thermal comfort Active occupant Environmental Control Indoor air Quality Visual acuity and comfort Green building rating or score Views to the outdoors Space efficiency Space flexibility	Reduction in cost	Lower maintenance cost; Lower health cost (absenteeism, health care); Lower employee recruiting and churn costs
2	Passive Design	Natural ventilation; Daylighting; Landscaping	Thermal comfort Active occupant Environmental Control Indoor air Quality Visual acuity and comfort Green building rating or score Views to the outdoors Space efficiency Space flexibility	Revenue Growth	Higher occupancy rates; Higher rents; Increased employee productivity; Improved marketing & sales
3	Electric Lighting	Fixtures upgrade; Controls; Redesign	Thermal comfort Active occupant Environmental Control Indoor air Quality Visual acuity and comfort Green building rating or score Views to the outdoors Space efficiency Space flexibility	Improved Reputation and Leadership	Recruiting best employees or tenants; Employee or tenant satisfaction and retention; Public relations/brand management; Retain "social license" to operate
4	Plug Loads & Misc.	Efficient equipment; Controls	Thermal comfort Active occupant Environmental Control Indoor air Quality Visual acuity and comfort Green building rating or score Views to the outdoors Space efficiency Space flexibility	Compliance with Internal and External Policies/ Initiatives	Meet needs of Global Reporting Initiative, Corporate Social; Responsibility, Carbon Disclosure Project; Meet responsible investment fund requirements; Meet growing Securities and Exchange Commission regulations
5	Heating, Cooling, & Ventilating	Demand control ventilation; Digital controls; Balance air & water flows; Chiller upgrade	Thermal comfort Active occupant Environmental Control Indoor air Quality Visual acuity and comfort Green building rating or score Views to the outdoors Space efficiency Space flexibility	Reduced Risk to Future Earnings	Reduced risk from energy disclosure mandates; Limit exposure to energy/water price volatility; Overall reduced potential loss of value due to functional obsolescence; Reduced legal risks—sick building syndrome and mold claims, etc.

== Policy framework for retrofitting ==
A paradigm shift is needed to achieve the motive of climate change mitigation through retrofitting. This shift is underpinned by a greater need to propagate behavioral change rather than just the technology implementation. The framework should move from a project focus outlook towards an understanding of a larger scale execution that includes social awareness and interests. Hence, there is the need for laying down large scale retrofitting programs that support the idea of cities as active sites to inculcate newer technologies.

=== Global ===
"Buildings will also be particularly affected by the effects of climate change: storms, flooding and seepages, reduced durability of some building materials and increased risk of structure damage or collapse (e.g. from severe storms) could all decrease building lifetime, while increasing health-related risks such as deteriorating indoor climate." (The GABC Global Roadmap)

To counter the global temperature-rise problem, a decision was reached at the Paris agreement in 2015, wherein member nations pledged to maintain temperatures below 2°C, compared to pre-industrial levels. The Global Status Report 2017 underscores the importance and potential of deep energy retrofitting among other solutions in achieving climate mitigation goals. Deep energy retrofitting is one of the solutions for reducing the carbon footprint of buildings. The report found that buildings & the construction industry together accounted for 36% of global final energy use & 39% of energy-related CO_{2} emissions. It calls for a 30% improvement, by 2030, in energy-use intensity (i.e. energy use per square meter) of the building sector, as compared to the 2015 levels, to achieve the Paris agreement goals. Though a growing number of countries have laid down policies to building energy performance improvements, a rapidly growing buildings sector, especially in developing countries, has offset those improvements. The report states that the efficiency improvements, including building envelope measures, represent nearly 2400 EJ in cumulative energy offsets to 2060 – more than all the final energy consumed by the global buildings sector over the last 20 years.

The report asserts that an aggressive scaling up of deep building energy renovations of the existing global stock is one of the important steps ahead. It refers to the Global Alliance for Buildings and Construction (GABC) Global Roadmap for building sector sustainability. The GABC Global Roadmap intends to 'accelerate the improvement of existing buildings' performance' towards energy-efficient, zero GHG emissions and resilient buildings well before the end of the century taking the following steps globally:

- Significant increase of renovation operations including energy efficiency.
- Upgrade of the level of energy efficiency of each operation, in line with long-term standards.

=== USA ===
An analysis for a 50% dip in energy consumption & carbon emissions by the US by 2050 translates to comprehensive energy efficiency retrofits in more than half the existing buildings.

The policy framework for retrofitting in the USA is directed at state and local levels. These efforts are supported by the national government. Hundreds of such programs exist, from basic energy audits and provision of financial rebates, to comprehensive programs that aim to optimize the entire house.

Carine et al. summarize the elements present mostly in the best programs as:

- Retrofit consultancy for consumers.
- Marketing to boost the demand-supply in this industry.
- Training, certification of retrofit contractors.
- Provision of rebates, upfront discounts.
- Investment in R&D.
- Building-efficiency labelling.

The Home Performance with Energy Star program is run by many bodies in the US, with the aid of the US Department of Energy. This project reports an average cost of $3500 per home retrofitted, with a distribution of 57%, 14%, 29% to homeowner incentives, contractor incentives, & administrative costs respectively.

In the commercial domain, the Energy Star Program by the US Environmental Protection Agency aims to reduce the carbon footprint of buildings. According to this initiative, owners benchmark their buildings on a scale of 1–100. Those scoring 75 & above receive 'Energy Star' designation; while the others are encouraged to follow upgrade strategies for better performance. Nearly 500,000 properties, representing about half of US commercial building floor area has been benchmarked as of 2016, with a total 29,500 buildings receiving the 'Energy Star' rating to that point.

Some major obstacles in its path of the retrofitting industry include:

- High initial investment.
- Complexity of retrofits.
- Lack of awareness regarding retrofitting.
- Shortage of affordable financing.

== Notable case studies ==
=== The Empire State Building ===
The Empire State Building has undergone a deep energy retrofit process that was completed in 2013. The project team, consisting of representatives from Johnson Controls, Rocky Mountain Institute, Clinton Climate Initiative, and Jones Lang LaSalle will have achieved an annual energy use reduction of 38% and $4.4 million. For example, the 6,500 windows were remanufactured onsite into superwindows which block heat but pass light. Air conditioning operating costs on hot days were reduced and this saved $17 million of the project's capital cost immediately, partly funding other retrofitting. Receiving a gold Leadership in Energy and Environmental Design (LEED) rating in September 2011, the Empire State Building is the tallest LEED certified building in the United States.

=== Indianapolis City-County Building ===
The Indianapolis City-County Building underwent a deep energy retrofit process in 2011, which has achieved an annual energy reduction of 46% and $750,000 annual energy saving.

Upon completion, the project team, consisting of representatives from the Indianapolis-Marion County Building Authority, Indianapolis Office of Sustainability, Rocky Mountain Institute, and Performance Services will have achieved an annual energy reduction of 46% and $750,000 annual energy savings.

== Market sizing ==
=== United States ===
A business case study by The Rockefeller Foundation sizes the potential of the retrofitting market in the USA. It projects a $279 billion investment opportunity. The residential sector, followed by commercial and institutional sectors, offers the largest business impact. Scaling up retrofitting efforts can create 3.3 billion direct and indirect cumulative job years in the United States.

== Criticism ==
=== Cost-effectiveness ===
Cost effectiveness can be achieved when the annual energy cost savings can equal or exceed the annual loan costs. Their perfect balance is referred as neutral net-monthly costs. Cost effectiveness could be a key driver in decision making related to deep energy retrofit projects.

A study by Less et al. (2015) found that:

- The most cost-effective projects were the ones in poor conditions – low efficiency equipment and little insulation. Such buildings did not pursue deep retrofit.
- The least cost effective projects were the ones having low pre-retrofit utility bills. But they had aggressive retrofit plans. Such a project cannot be said to be a failure because cost-effectiveness may not be the project goal.

Less et al. (2015) found that on average, the U.S. deep energy retrofits were cash-flow neutral on a monthly basis. However, variability was large, with some projects substantially reducing net-monthly costs and others substantially increasing net-costs. Questionable cost-effectiveness is thus, seen as a barrier to widespread of deep energy retrofits.

=== Energy savings and evaluation ===
Although many modeling tools are available to assess home energy savings, the inaccuracy of their predictions (compared to actual energy use measurements) limits their usefulness. Cluett et al. point that the pilot programs should monitor actual energy savings to evaluate project impact and help calibrate estimation tools.

== See also ==
- Rocky Mountain Institute
- Efficient energy use
- Quadruple glazing
- Leadership in Energy and Environmental Design
- Sustainable refurbishment
- Zero-energy building
- Zero heating building
- Northwest Energy Efficiency Alliance
- United States Department of Energy
- Energy Savings Performance Contract
