= HERO Program =

American financing program

The HERO Program is an energy efficient financing program in the United States. The name HERO stands for Home Energy Renovation Opportunity. The HERO Program is a Property Assessed Clean Energy (PACE) Program, which provides financing for energy-efficient, water-efficient and renewable energy products to home and business owners in approved communities within California and Missouri. The financing provided by the HERO Program is repaid through annual property tax payments, which are collected by the county and in some cases may be passed on to a new property owner if the property is sold.

== History ==
Renovate America developed the HERO Program in 2010 through a partnership with the Western Riverside Council of Governments (WRCOG), a public agency representing 18 communities within Riverside County. Western Riverside County became the first region to offer the HERO Program to its constituents. The HERO Program is now accessible to over 85% of Californians.

As of July 2014, the HERO program has created 2,400 new jobs in the construction sector and has $250 million in funded projects on 12,500 homes in California.

== How it Works ==
Homeowners who meet the minimum criteria are eligible for financing through the HERO Program. Once a homeowner or commercial property owner is eligible for HERO Program financing, HERO finances 100% of the cost to purchase and install eligible energy saving products. The repayment of the financing is included in the property tax bills. Property tax payments that are made through an impound escrow account will be adjusted on the monthly payment by the lender. Similar to a mortgage, the interest paid on the principal balance may have tax benefits. Should a property be sold before the financing is repaid, in some cases the remaining payments can be passed onto the new property owner.

PACE stands for Property Assessed Clean Energy. It refers to a type of financing that allows Property Owners to borrow money to install energy efficiency improvements on their property via special assessments on their property taxes lasting up to 20 years depending on the useful life of the product. Approvals are based on the homeowners having at least 10% equity in their home, being current with property taxes and mortgage payments, not having recently filed for bankruptcy, and other requirements. If the property is sold or transferred, in many cases the property tax assessments remain tied to the property. However, this process depends on the transfer restrictions established by the buyer's lender. In order for a PACE Program to become available in a City or County, PACE legislation must be in place on the State or Federal level.

== Concerns ==
See PACE financing concerns.
