= Sustainable refurbishment =

Concept in environmentalism

Sustainable refurbishment describes working on existing buildings to improve their environmental performance using sustainable methods and materials. A refurbishment or retrofit is defined as: "any work to a building over and above maintenance to change its capacity, function or performance' in other words, any intervention to adjust, reuse, or upgrade a building to suit new conditions or requirements". Refurbishment can be done to a part of a building, an entire building, or a campus. Sustainable refurbishment takes this a step further to modify the existing building to perform better in terms of its environmental impact and its occupants' environment.

Most sustainable refurbishments are also green retrofits: any refurbishment of an existing building that aims to reduce the carbon emissions and environmental impact of the building. This can include improving the energy efficiency of the HVAC and other mechanical systems, increasing the quality of insulation in the building envelope, implementing sustainable energy generation, and aiming to improve occupant comfort and health.

Green retrofits have become increasingly prominent with their inclusion in a number of building rating systems, such as the USGBC's LEED for Existing Buildings: Operations & Maintenance, Passive House EnerPHit, and Green Globes for Existing Buildings. Some governments offer funding towards green retrofits as existing buildings make up a majority of operational buildings and have been identified as a growing area of consideration in the fight against climate change.

== Overview ==
Sustainable refurbishment is the equivalent of sustainable development which relates to new developments of cities, buildings or industries etc. Sustainable refurbishment includes insulation and related measures to reduce the energy consumption of buildings, installation of renewable energy sources such as solar water heating and photovoltaics, measures to reduce water consumption, and changes to reduce overheating, improve ventilation and improve internal comfort. The process of sustainable refurbishment includes minimizing the waste of existing components, recycling and using environmentally friendly materials, and minimizing energy use, noise and waste during the refurbishment.

The importance of sustainable refurbishment is that the majority of buildings in use are not new and thus were constructed when energy standards were low or non-existent, and are otherwise incompatible with current standards or the expectations of users. Much of the existing building stock is likely to be in use for many years to come since demolition and replacement is often unacceptable owing to cost, social disruption or because the building is of architectural and/or historical interest. The solution is to refurbish or renovate such buildings to make them appropriate for current and future use and to satisfy current requirements and standards of energy use and comfort.

Sustainable refurbishment is not a new concept but is gaining recognition and importance owing to current concerns about high energy use leading to climate change, overheating in buildings, the need for healthy internal environments, waste and environmental damage associated with materials production. Many governments are beginning to realize the importance of sustainably renovating their existing building stock, rather than just raising standards for new buildings and developments, and are producing guidance and grants and other support and stimulation activities. Think-tanks, lobby groups and voluntary organizations continue to publicize and promote the need for and practice of sustainable refurbishment. For these reasons, multiple countries have started to develop demonstration projects.

The techniques of sustainable refurbishment have been developing over many years and though the principles are very similar to those used on new buildings, the practice and details appropriate for the wide range of situations found in old buildings has required development of specific solutions and guidance to optimize the process and avoid subsequent problems. Recently, many government-sponsored sources have developed technical guidance regarding sustainable refurbishment practices and have published their findings.

=== Retrofits ===
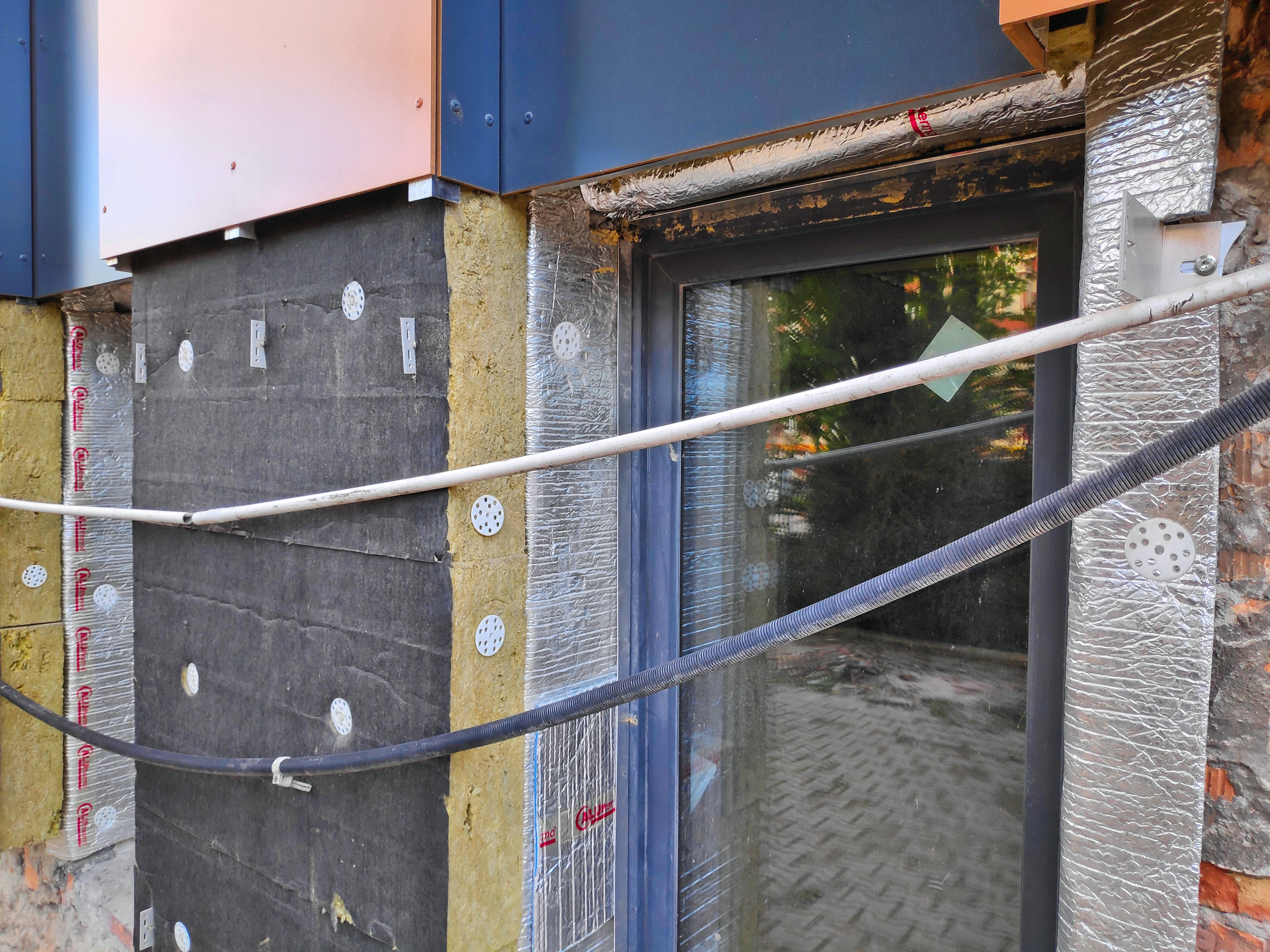
Thermal insulation retrofit works on a department store building in Poland

Most retrofits can be considered somewhat "green" because rather than constructing a new building, an existing one is improved. This saves resources that would otherwise be used to build an entirely new structure. A green retrofit typically aims to incorporate sustainability and save energy costs with each design decision.

Retrofitting a building inherently carries the constraints of the existing building and site. For example, the orientation of a building in regard to the sun has a great impact on its energy performance, but it's generally not within the scope of a retrofit to rotate the building. Budgetary constraints also often impact the energy conservation measures proposed.

Until recently, green retrofits have generally been considered as one-off projects for specific buildings or clients, but given the increased emphasis on improving the energy efficiency of existing building stock in the face of climate change, they are beginning to be reviewed systematically and at scale. The main challenge this presents for governments and advocacy groups is that the existing building stock is characterized by different uses, located in disparate climatic areas, and uses different construction traditions and system technologies. Because of these disparities, it is difficult to characterize strategies that apply to all buildings.

Green retrofits have recently garnered considerable research attention due to government emphasis on retrofitting old building stock to address climate change. It is estimated that up to half of building stock is always over 40 years old. Older buildings have significantly worse energy performance than their modern counterparts due to shortcomings in their design, deterioration in mechanical system efficiency, and increases in envelope permeability. The energy use intensity of houses in the United States dropped 9% from 1985 to 2004 due to improvements in end-use energy efficiency and code improvements. However, this is offset by the overall increase in the total number of houses.

== Reasons ==
=== Climate Change ===
One of the objectives of the United Nations Framework Convention on Climate Change (UNFCCC) is the mitigation of greenhouse gas emissions that contribute to climate change. More specifically, the UN supports the immediate reduction of building-related greenhouse gas emissions. Building refurbishment plays a key role in the decarbonization of the current building stock. Other than tearing down existing buildings, it is the only way to improve building performance or to develop zero-emission buildings. Energy-efficient refurbishments are a tool to reduce energy consumption in buildings, which will result in lower greenhouse gas emissions and resource use. Studies present the significance of the possible impact of widespread refurbishment implementation on individual GHG emissions, but also worldwide emissions and energy consumption.

=== Environmental Justice & Social Sustainability ===
Social sustainability relates to the impacts of a building on the surrounding or occupying society, community, and individuals. This is considered in environmental impact assessment tools, such as life cycle assessment (LCA). Sustainable refurbishment integrates economic, social, and environmental needs to improve upon the existing building conditions. For example, sustainable buildings are socially sustainable because they are healthier for occupants due to the use of materials that do not negatively impact health.

Organizations such as 'Her Retrofit Space' in the UK, focus on empowering women professionals in the retrofit industry. By providing resources, training access, and networking opportunities, they aim to close the gender gap in the industry while advancing sustainable refurbishment practices. With the need to expand the workforce in many countries, advocating women in the workforce is an important aspect of driving workforce growth.

=== Indoor Environmental Quality ===
The indoor environmental quality of the existing building stock is known to often be more unsatisfactory and unhealthy than the outdoor environment due to the design and materials used. The leading argument for sustainable refurbishment, and sustainable building in general, is the belief that green buildings are healthier and more satisfactory for occupants. The specifications for sustainable refurbishments take measures to ensure that the materials and building framework does not radiate dangerous particulates and gasses, like sulfur dioxide and nitrogen dioxide, into the indoor environment, and further measures are taken to filter indoor air for inhabitants. The "Citizen's Healthcare Principle" states that sustainable refurbishments must ensure that buildings are safe and improve living quality for those inside. The refurbishment design must consider both the indoor microclimate and the external environment around the building when developing the program. The microclimate parameters that should be considered include:

- Air velocity
- Humidity
- Dew point
- Lighting
- Air circulation velocity
- Acoustics
- Temperature

=== Historic Conservation ===
The preservation of historic buildings is inherently sustainable since it maximizes the lifespan of existing materials and infrastructure. Conserving the materials and existing structures reduces waste and preserves the character of small historic communities. Many argue that the epitome of sustainability is to not build at all, which equites to preservation and refurbishment.

=== Finite Resources: Materials and Energy ===
As a society, we have a finite amount of many resources, nonrenewable energy sources for example. Non-sustainable buildings, in terms of their operation, also consume a significant amount of non-renewable energy resources, relative to other industries. Again, it is necessary to increase the energy efficiency of the existing building stick to reduce non-renewable energy resource consumption, or even replace that with renewable sources entirely. Efficiency can be improved through sustainable building refurbishments that modify the building systems and building operations. With buildings becoming more energy efficient it is increasingly important to look at the life cycle impact of the materials that make up the building. Designing and constructing buildings that are not sustainable for long lifetimes allows for the construction and demolition of buildings with short lifetimes, which wastes construction materials that are not used for their entire lifetime capacity. Reusing existing buildings enables building owners to use the embodied energy that is already invested in the building composition, rather than wasting that embodied carbon and consuming more with a new building construction.

== Development of the Goals of Sustainable Refurbishment ==
This section lays out a timeline and progression of the development of the goals of sustainable refurbishment from a few different authors:

The main goals of "sustainable development", by Baldwin in 1996, include minimizing the impact on human health and the environment, optimal use of non-renewable resources, utilizing renewable resources, and future planning and adaptability. Minimizing impact on the climate and ecological system is achieved through a reduction of emissions of greenhouse gasses, which is connected to the other goal of optimizing the use of non-renewable resources. By reducing the non-renewable energy sources used to construct and operate buildings, the embodied greenhouse gas emissions from buildings are also reduced. The refurbishment could also attempt to protect and enhance local ecology through landscape architecture. Human health is preserved by increasing ventilation and air filtration of indoor spaces and by avoiding potentially harmful construction materials that can impact respiratory health. This can also be achieved by encouraging the reuse or recycling of materials to reduce or eliminate material waste. The goal of renewable resource use can be achieved in a refurbishment by electrifying the home's heating and cooling systems, by installing on-site renewables generation and storage, or by using renewable resource products as building materials – like timber. Building for the future can be achieved through refurbishment by making an existing building more durable and extending the previous lifespan of the building.

In 1996, Keeping and Shiers described the goals of "green refurbishments" as having three parts. The first part includes lower utility costs since less energy is consumed due to a combination of efficient and passive heating and cooling systems. The second part ensures lower maintenance costs since the refurbished systems are simpler and were installed to be accessible for repairs. Finally, the third portion claims that buildings with green refurbishments are healthier and more comfortable for occupants.

Ultimately, in 2006, Sitar et al. defined the principles of "sustainable refurbishments". The goals include decreasing the energy used during operation, which includes heating, cooling, ventilation, lighting, etc. Another goal is the utilization of both renewable energy sources and low-impact materials regarding the indoor micro-environment, as well as the exterior macro-environment. They claim to achieve improvement in living conditions in terms of human health, user-friendly controls, and adaptability for future needs. The goal is that this all be achieved through innovation planning to develop a design that is environmentally, economically, and socially beneficial.

== Characteristics of Sustainable Refurbishment ==
=== Holistic Improvement ===
Sustainable refurbishments aim to reach "total building performance optimization" with the integrates of multiple systems throughout the building and the community. The refurbishment not only decreases energy consumption but also improves occupant comfort in terms of noise, temperature, lighting, etc. It extends the life cycle of the building, reduces environmental impact, and creates healthy occupant conditions.

=== Environmental Responsibility ===
Sustainable refurbishments aim to minimize the negative environmental impacts of the renovation by reducing quantities of harmful materials, utilizing energy-saving technology, and retrofitting the building for renewable energy use, as opposed to non-renewable energy sources. Some responsible environmental measures that can be incorporated in a building retrofit include energy and water efficiency, waste reduction and recycling, use of low environmental impact materials, and effective building operation. An example of energy-efficient designs could include high-efficiency lighting and smart controls. Similarly, an example of water-efficient design could include dual-flushing toilets, greywater recycling, or aerating water fixtures.

=== Energy Efficiency ===
A sustainable retrofit ensures that the energy performance of the building after renovation is significantly better than it was before the work. The increase in energy performance must meet the current building regulations for new buildings. The sustainable approach would be to even design beyond the code minimum and plan for future requirements. A deep energy refurbishment should include the integration of energy generation on-site from renewable energy sources, with the goal of developing a nearly zero-energy building. The energy efficiency gained through the architectural retrofit makes the integration of renewable energy sources cost-effective. A study in the United Kingdom showed that, after a refurbishment, buildings had lower operating costs even if sustainability was not a priority of the retrofit.

A study of energy refurbishments of residential buildings showed that the refurbishment led to an average thermal energy savings of 59% during the heating season. The savings consisted of 25% from thermal insulation addition in exterior walls and floor, 10% from window insulation improvements, 6% from a reduction in air exchange, and 18% from the installation of heating controls. The retrofit of the building envelope and operation reduced the energy consumption of the building, the associated greenhouse gas emissions during the operation phase, and the overall environmental impact.

Sustainable refurbishment ensures energy efficiency by improving the following systems:

- Insulation
- Building Envelope Tightness
- Heating
- Cooling
- Conditioning
- Lighting

There are typical strategies to improve upon each of the above systems. Innovative insulation materials can be utilized that have a lower environmental impact, but even non-sustainable insulation additions can improve the energy performance of the building. The building envelope can be improved by replacing the existing windows with efficient windows in terms of thermal bridging and optimizing solar gain. The use of passive ventilation strategies or hybrid systems that use both passive and active strategies reduces the energy required for conditioning. Buildings' heating and cooling systems can be powered with solar energy, or even use solar-heated water, which both reduce non-renewable energy consumption through heating and cooling. Finally, the electricity used for lighting can be reduced by optimizing daylighting in occupiable spaces.

=== Improved Materials Based on Impact ===
The overall environmental impact of a sustainable refurbishment is highly dependent on the material choices for the refurbishment. The Rational Resources Principle for refurbishment encourages the efficient use of construction materials and natural resources. This is quantified through life cycle analysis that measures the impact of a material over its lifetime, which stretches into the "D phase" that includes end-of-life waste after the building is demolished. Waste transportation adds costs to both construction and building maintenance. Designing refurbishments that reduce waste, and maximize reuse, minimize waste hauling costs in the short-term and long-term by using materials for their entire intended life.

When materials can be compared on the basis of a common bottom line, through life cycle analysis, an optimum path for the design appears. Ultimately, since the refurbishment will require additional construction materials, there will be a negative environmental impact, but the aim of sustainable refurbishment is to minimize these impacts. For example, reusing on-site timber, using reclaimed timber, and using timber from renewable certified sources are sustainable material choices based on taking advantage of the embodied carbon that has already been invested in those materials. As was mentioned prior, the analysis of the life cycle of building materials' primary energy demand and global warming potential is becoming more important as buildings are consuming less energy during their operation. The human health impact of materials is also included in their life cycle assessment, meaning that a construction material cannot be sustainable if it harms its occupants. Therefore, sustainable refurbishments should not include adhesives, paints, or glues that expel low-volatile organic compounds into the indoor air of the building. Materials that harm indoor occupants or the exterior ecology are considered lethal and are therefore not utilized in sustainable refurbishments.

=== Concept Model ===
The image shown is a conceptual model of sustainable refurbishment. The dimensions of the model include technical, economic, architectural, social, ecological, and cultural. The dimensions are all related and influence each other and the refurbishment design itself.

== Steps of Sustainable Refurbishment Process ==
The principle of sustainable refurbishment should be incorporated into the project development from the first blueprint through building commissioning and turnover. This section provides a generalized description of steps in the design process for a sustainable refurbishment:

1. Data collection: This includes analyzing the problem formulation and developing project goals.

2. Determination of the degree of refurbishment necessary: Multiple conditions of the building must be investigated before modeling can be done including physical deterioration, the presence of moisture, any thermal bridging, whether current code requirements are met, if there is high energy demand/consumption, the quality of the indoor environmental and air quality, the quality of the outdoor air quality, and whether the building has unsatisfied occupants.

3. Modeling phase: In order to develop a model, architects must first analyze the data collected, develop criteria to base the alternative comparison, and develop design alternatives (consider stakeholders and look at best practices)

4. Selection Phase: Once multiple options are available for the building, architects must evaluate alternative layouts, address strengths and weaknesses, and then ultimately choose a recommendation and optimize the chosen design.

5. Implementation Phase: In the modeling phase, the greater environment impacted by the refurbishment is often accounted for and then decisions are made based on this context. The social and political conditions of the community also need to be considered, especially the living conditions and standards of those within the buildings being updated. Finally, the ecological conditions need to be considered, including the average temperature, humidity, soil quality, natural resources, and topography. With all of these conditions in mind, the necessary changes can finally be implemented.

== Components of a green retrofit ==
=== Integrated design ===
Green retrofits utilize an integrated design strategy. This is in opposition to the traditional waterfall design strategy, in which architects, engineers, and contractors operate independently from one another. In an integrated design strategy, these teams work together to leverage their areas of expertise and solve design problems while also considering the building as a whole. This is imperative for a green retrofit, where the design solutions are often constrained by the existing site. This could relate to the orientation and geometry of the existing building form, the size of the site, or the installation requirements of the existing and proposed mechanical systems. Because these constraints affect all aspects of building design, the only way sustainable, effective, and cost-efficient solutions can be synthesized is when project teams consider all these aspects from the project start.

=== Occupant behavior ===
Many sustainable building practices are passive and can be automated, like insulation or light controls. Others depend on the behavior of the building's occupants to realize their full energy efficiency potential. An energy-efficient heating system does very little good if the windows are left open in winter. Per Ascione et al., "the first lever of energy efficiency is a proper energy education of users". Green retrofits can involve training building occupants in sustainable practices and building systems that they'll interact with, which helps ensure that any energy conservation measures used will reach their full design potential. Training can be handled by system manufacturers or the project design team.

Smart energy management can also be implemented into sustainable buildings through AI-driven HVAC, lighting systems, climate control, and adaptive lighting. With AI, these building functions can be controlled based on activity patterns to more efficiently manage energy. Additionally, behavior-responsive water fixtures can be implemented to limit water usage based on user habits.

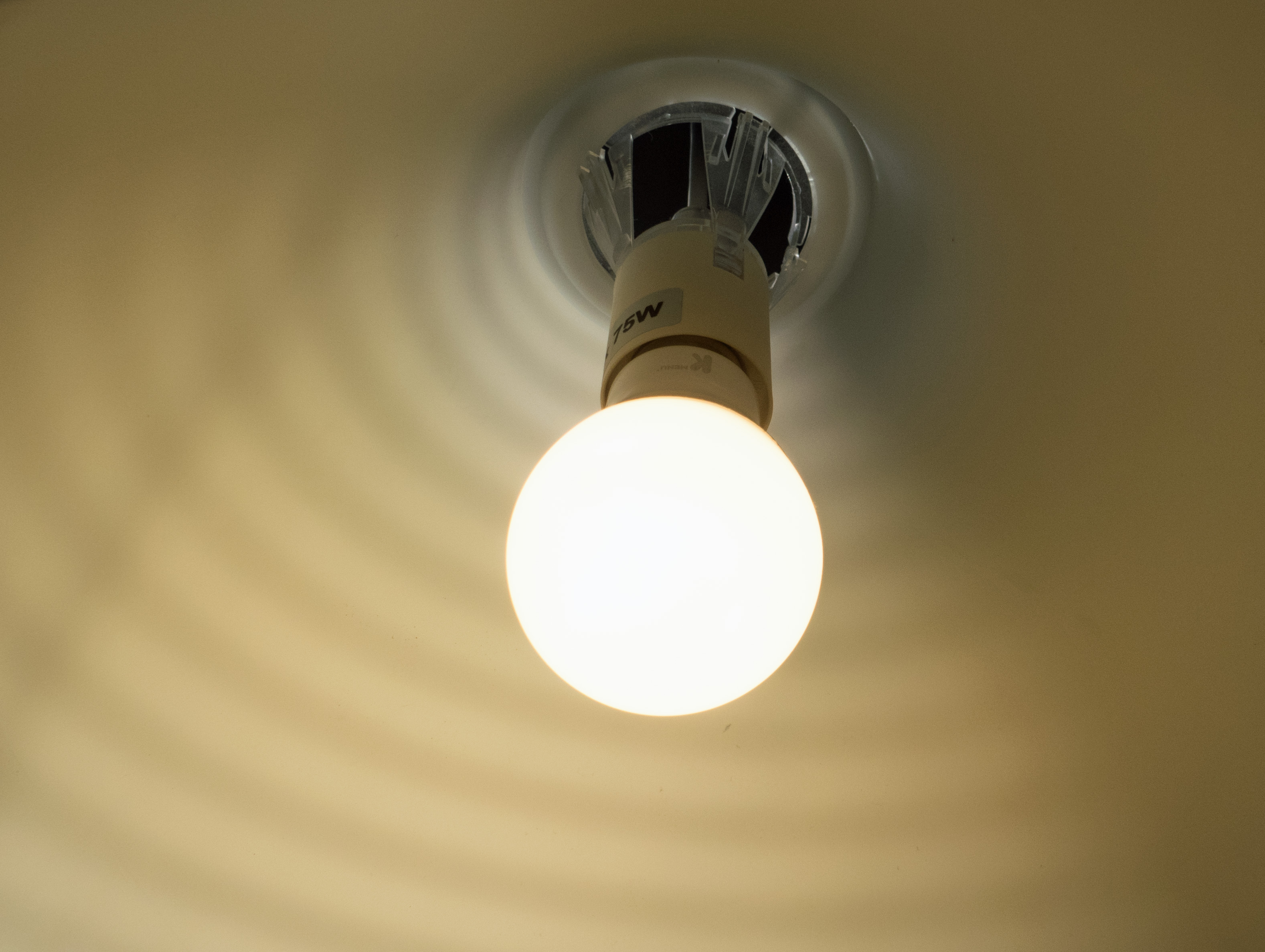
LED bulbs are a popular and effective choice for green lighting retrofits.

=== Lighting retrofits ===
One of the most common forms of a green retrofit is a full or partial lighting retrofit. A lighting retrofit usually consists of replacing all or some of the lightbulbs in a building with newer, more efficient models. This can also include changing light fixtures, ballasts, and drivers. LED bulbs are generally the preferred choice in a lighting retrofit because of their greatly increased efficiency compared to incandescent bulbs, but other types of bulbs like compact fluorescent or metal halides may be used as well.

Lighting retrofits are a popular form of green retrofit because, compared to other methods of improving energy efficiency, they are relatively straightforward to plan and execute, and the energy savings often provide a quick return on investment. Most modern LED and compact fluorescent bulbs are designed to work with existing light fixtures and rarely involve any additional work than removing and screwing in a new lightbulb. The installation is also relatively quick compared to more invasive energy conservation measures.

Lighting retrofits can also include implementing new lighting controls like occupancy sensors, daylight sensors, and timers. When correctly implemented, these controls can reduce the demand for lighting. However, due to the complicated nature of lighting controls, there is debate as to whether or not they are an effective energy conserving measure because of the prevalence of over-optimistic energy usage reduction estimates and the difficulty in predicting the actions of human occupants.

=== HVAC retrofits ===
Heating, ventilation, and air conditioning (HVAC) account for around 50% of a building's operating energy consumption, and HVAC retrofits can account for 40-70% of energy savings. Reducing this consumption can provide both energy and cost savings, so it is the main focus of many green retrofits, especially in colder climates where heating accounts for over 60% of energy use. The heating system, cooling system, air handling systems, humidification systems, and ductwork in the building are often considered.

Heat recovery ventilation is recommended for newly air-sealed homes as it uses the heat from the warm, moist, stale air that is being vented from the home to warm the cool, fresh, and filtered air that is entering the home. This allows for minimal heat loss while mitigating concerns of carbon monoxide poisoning, radon gas, or harmful particulates accumulating in the home.

Other green HVAC retrofits can include implementing a newer, more efficient model of the same type as the existing system, such as replacing an old water boiler with a more efficient one to feed a hydronic heating system. Sometimes a larger system overhaul is merited—for example, exchanging an old boiler for a newer ground or air source heat pump system.

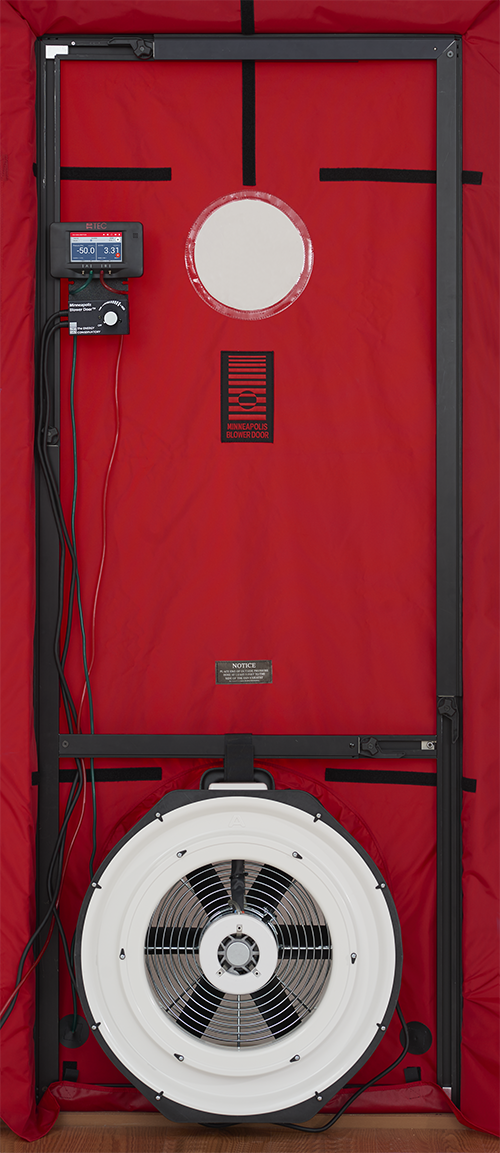
A blower door test can locate leaks in a building envelope.

=== Building envelope retrofits ===
Thermal insulation and building envelope performance are key to the overall energy performance of any building. Many older buildings are not insulated up to current standards, let alone up to the standards recommended in many green building rating systems. Many of these buildings spend energy and money heating, cooling, or conditioning the air inside them only to see it seep out through leaks in the building envelope or through poorly insulated windows.

During many green retrofits, the first step towards improving the building's envelope is to evaluate its current shortcomings. Air-sealing is an easily accessible and cost-efficient way to improve the energy efficiency of a home that is mechanically heated or cooled. Caulking can be used to fill gaps in immobile areas like window and door frames and or poorly sealed appliances. Weather stripping can be used where moving parts meet, such as the area between the door and the doorframe or windows that can open. These drafty areas can be found by feeling for temperature differences and drafts on days when the temperature inside the house is dramatically different than the temperature outside the house, burning incense and watching how the smoke moves to detect drafts, or hiring a professional to perform a blower door test. In a blower door test, a door with a fan and a gauge is installed into one of the doorways and the house is depressurized. The gauge can then measure the air changes per hour (ACH), or how many times the volume of air in the house is completely replaced in one hour. The draftier a house is, the higher the air changes per hour will be.

==== Window retrofits ====
Windows are the weakest point of insulation in a building's envelope and contribute greatly to how thermally effective that envelope is. Because of this, windows are another common area of focus for a green retrofit. Similar to a lighting retrofit, windows are a relatively straightforward aspect of a building to retrofit, with easy-to-calculate payback periods. Modern, efficient windows are generally sized for existing window openings and can usually be installed without much additional work on the building envelope.

Most green retrofits will replace older single-pane windows with more efficient triple-paned varieties that are filled with an inert gas such as argon or krypton. These windows have greater R-values, so they insulate a space far better than single-pane windows. Some windows have low-e coatings to control the solar heat gain coefficient.

=== Green roof retrofits ===
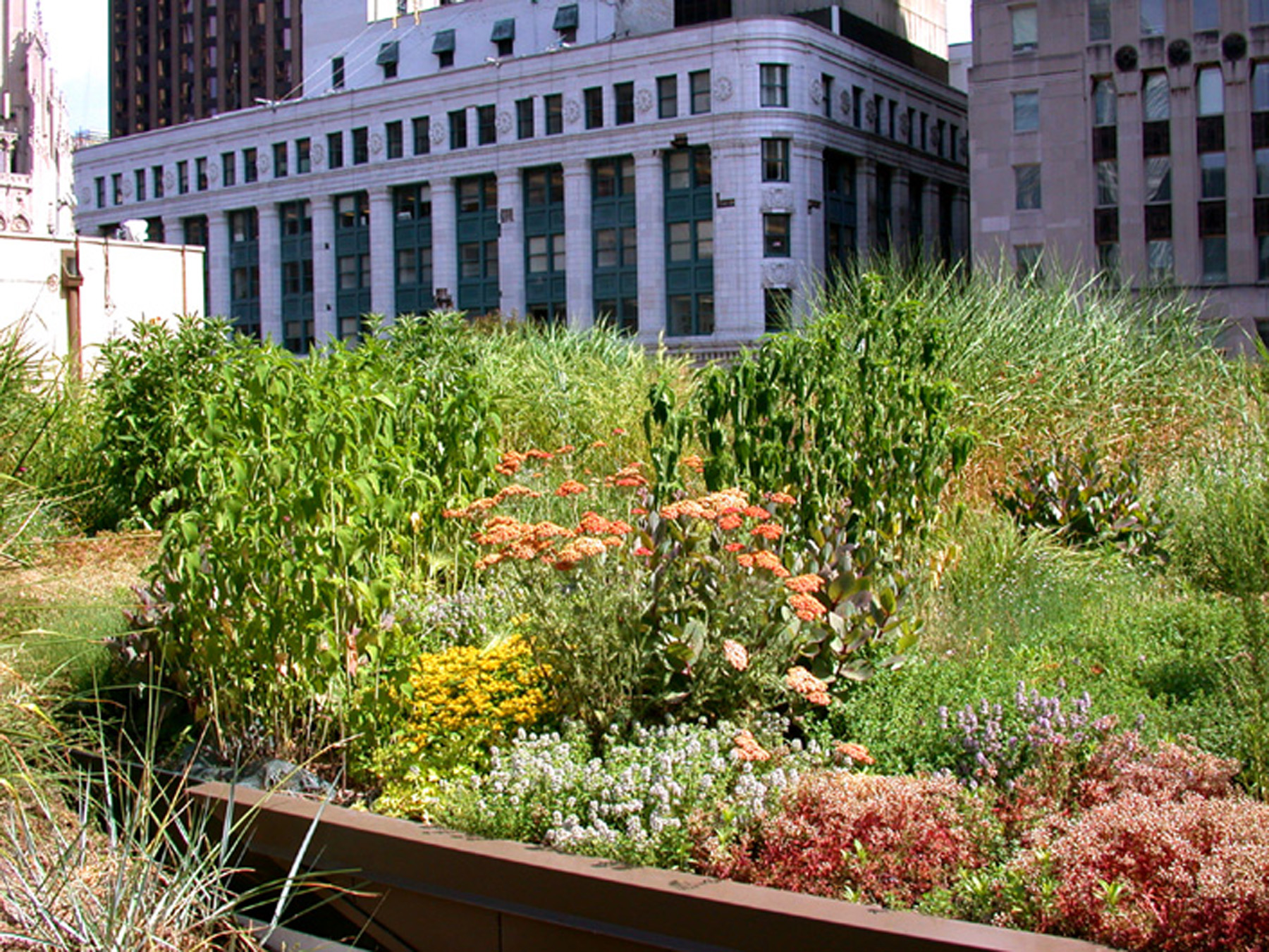
The Chicago City Hall retrofitted a semi-intensive green roof in 2001.

Green roofs, also called living roofs, have a number of major benefits, including reducing stormwater runoff and urban heat island effect, increasing roof insulation, improving building acoustics, and providing biodiversity.

There are many factors to account for when considering a green roof for a green retrofit. Extensive green roofs use a thin substrate layer for the often shorter vegetation that needs less room for roots to grow. Intensive green roofs use a thicker growing substrate to accommodate larger plant species that require more space for their roots. Semi-intensive green roofs fall somewhere in between the two. The strength of the existing structure must be considered; many existing structures were not designed for an intensive green roof, which can carry a considerable structural load. The existing roof also needs to be evaluated for stripping or re-waterproofing. Some roofs can simply be laid over with sedum mats, while others require additional work to prepare. A peaked or sloped roof does not preclude the installation of a green roofing system but can influence the installation costs and product choices available.

In general, older buildings with lower existing insulation values benefit the most from green roof retrofits, and where there are no modifications necessary to install one, green roofs have been shown to have many benefits.

=== Passive design ===
Passive design is a design strategy that uses the shape and placement of the architecture and landscaping to heat, cool, light, ventilate, and sometimes provide power to the building. Often, this impacts the shape of the building envelope, the orientation of the building, and the placement of the building. The shape of the building can also create microclimates in which the building is designed to trap heat or funnel breezes for warming in the winter or cooling in the summer. While these passive design elements are more often applied in newly built green buildings, passive design can still be a consideration in green retrofits. For example, if there are windows that receive very little sunlight in the winter or a large amount of sunlight in the summer, those may be replaced first to reduce an undesirable amount of heat lost in the winter or gained in the summer. Using landscaping, such as planting a deciduous tree in front of south-facing windows to maximize solar heat gain in the winter while shading the windows in the summer, is also an example of passive design.

== Sustainable Refurbishment Case Study ==
A 2019 case study in Vienna explored the impact of a sustainable refurbishment that included a Multi-Active Façade System. The assumption of the study was that the improvement of the outermost layer of the structure, the façade shell, was the most important regarding energy efficiency. Insulation, specifically, was a major contributor to energy savings during building operation, and a life cycle analysis was required to make an informed decision about the insulation material. The façade system in this study reduced the building's energy demand with insulation and corrugated board, which passively increased the solar gain in the winter when extra heat was required to minimize energy consumption and reduced the solar gain during the summer. This was achieved by installing the façade at a strategic angle to allow ultraviolet rays to pass through only when the sun is at its lower winter angle. The façade also integrated renewable energy generation into the shell itself, as well as energy storage for when there is no active radiation. After the sustainable refurbishment with the new facade, the heating demand for the building was modeled to be about 53% less than the baseline value. The low energy demand even exceeded the new building standard requirements for 2021 by about 45%, making the design adaptable and resilient for the future.

== Costs, barriers, and benefits ==
Possible benefits of green retrofits include but are not exclusive to: improved energy security, reduced air pollution, improved indoor air quality through technology such as MVHR, reduced greenhouse gas emissions and impact on climate change, increased thermal comfort, enhanced indoor air quality and occupant health, generation of local jobs, and reduction of peak electrical demand.

Possible barriers to green retrofits include: initial cost and financing, lack of knowledge and experience of the designers, architects, construction workers, inspectors, and financial institutions involved in the project, building code regulations, and lack of consumer interest.

The scope of a green retrofit can vary widely. It can involve specific building systems, like the lighting, or can be a full renovation of all non-structural components. While a lighting retrofit is straightforward to execute and relatively unobtrusive to building occupants, it will not generally carry as much of a benefit or cost as an insulation retrofit. When weighing the benefits and costs of a green retrofit, each of these components are typically considered towards the project as a whole.

While green retrofits do have an up-front cost, the amount depends on how extensive the retrofits are. Likewise, the kind of retrofit that is implemented will also impact how fast the investment is returned in savings. The economic feasibility of a green retrofit depends on the state of installed systems of the existing building, the proposed design, the energy costs of the local utility grid, and the climatic conditions of the site. Any economic incentives granted will depend on what country or state the project is in. These incentives differ regionally and can affect the total project feasibility. In Ireland, for example, "shallow" green retrofits have been found to be economically feasible, but "deep" retrofits are often not feasible without government grant aid to offset the initial capital costs.

The EU has found that implementing green retrofit programs comes with the benefit of "energy security, job creation, fuel poverty alleviation, health and indoor comfort".

Green retrofits can carry benefits such as the re-use of existing building material. Concrete and steel have some of the highest embodied energy impacts of any building material and can account for up to 60% of the carbon used in the construction of a building. They are primarily used in the structure of a building, which usually remains untouched in retrofits.

Most types of green retrofit introduce new building materials into the space which can themselves emit harmful indoor air pollutants. The amount, type, and exposure to these pollutants will depend on the material itself, what it is used for, and how it is installed. Often, green retrofits call for sealing leaks in the building envelope to prevent the escape of conditioned air, but if this is not offset by an increase in ventilation, it can contribute to higher concentrations of indoor air pollutants in the building.

== Responses and Criticism ==
=== Social Justice ===
This gap in building improvement is moving toward being more frequently addressed by policymakers to avoid an environmental justice issue with a "two-tiered" market. The premium stock has high rental prices which incentivize owners to invest in them further, which is not the case for the lower quality stock. Many argue that it is not just that only occupants that can afford premium housing get to live in the ensured healthy and comfortable environment of a sustainable refurbishment. The Affordability Principle states that sustainable refurbishments should be affordable for the general population. Health disparities and carbon emissions may also be reduced through the implementation of making building more efficient, thus ensuring a more equitable future for all. In addition, many call for the information about sustainable refurbishment to be shared and freely available to people of all income levels, ages, races, etc. in order that everyone have an equal opportunity to live better

=== Technological Developments Needed ===
There is criticism of the efficacy of sustainable refurbishment in terms of decarbonizing the current building stock. This criticism is directed specifically toward large-scale energy refurbishments of industrial structures. One could argue that the embodied and operational carbon of those types of buildings are significantly larger than that of smaller residential or office buildings which are discussed in this article. However, the technology to efficiently heat, cool, and power these structures do not yet exist, and they cannot completely rely on passive strategies due to more stringent code restrictions. It cannot be expected that these large-impact buildings be refurbished if it cannot be done economically. This argument impacts the hopeful global energy consumption decrease that researchers propose for sustainable refurbishments.

=== Adaptability of Current Housing Stock ===
Another criticism of sustainable refurbishments is that not all existing buildings are good candidates for refurbishment. Put plainly, it is challenging to improve on buildings that were poorly designed from the start. It was proven that floor plans that are typical, with deep shapes, were more adaptable than irregular designs. Similarly, floor-to-floor heights impact the designer and contractor's ability to modify utility ducts, meaning that taller buildings are easier to refurbish. Research also shows that structures that qualify as "higher grade" building stock experience greater levels and frequency of sustainable refurbishment. There seem to be a number of reasons for this, one being that premium buildings undergo retrofit earlier in their lifecycle in order to compete with newer sustainable buildings. It can be argued that it is not sustainable to replace building systems early in their lifecycle, just to invest in additional embodied carbon and discard the old equipment into a landfill. However, there is an opportunity for "young" removed materials to be utilized in lower-quality refurbishments in low-income communities. In an Australian study using data from 2007, it was found that about 89% of all premium retrofits were to buildings that were less than 25 years old, with the remaining 11% aged between 26 and 50 years old. The same study showed that no refurbishments occurred in the "least desirable" stock locations.

== Case Studies ==
=== Journal Of International Affairs ===
Based on a study conducted by the Journal of International Affairs, 41% of citizens from urban areas, 34% of citizens from suburban areas, and 46% of citizens from rural areas have a high interest in smart street lighting. Smart street lighting refers to street lighting systems that use technology to improve public street lighting efficiency, safety, and management with energy-efficient LEDs that utilize sensors and wireless connectivity to allow for the remote control and monitoring of lighting levels based on real-time conditions. With these systems, the brightness of street lights is automatically adjusted based on various conditions such as the time of day, level of traffic, and environmental conditions. Essentially, smart street lighting saves energy by effectively managing the energy used for lighting. Even further, 52% of citizens from both urban and suburban areas, and 53% of citizens living in rural areas, are interested in free public Wifi networks as part of smart city initiatives. Free public Wifi networks are essential for smart cities as they support the various initiatives within smart cities and enable digital inclusion by bridging the digital divide and enhancing economic opportunities. More so, 31% of citizens from urban areas, 23% of citizens from suburban areas, and 31% of citizens from rural areas are interested in smart cities implementing monitoring for critical systems. Critical systems monitoring refers to the real-time tracking and analysis of city functions using technology in order to identify and address any potential issues within city operation systems. With the use of cameras, sensors, and devices, data is gathered on the infrastructure, service, and public safety within urban areas, and rapid responses are formed to optimize city operations. And finally, 40% of citizens in urban areas, 23% of citizens in suburban areas, and 31% of citizens in rural areas are in favor of public transportation as part of smart cities. With technology, smart cities are able to improve public transportation systems by offering benefits such as real-time travel information, congestion control, and increased urban mobility.

=== Bio Web of Conferences (1) ===
The BIO Web of Conferences conducted a study where they measured the initial carbon emissions of four cities and then implemented smart city initiatives and measured the carbon emissions after the implementation of these technologies. They saw a significant reduction in carbon emissions within all cities, especially those that had high initial emissions. For example, sample city B, which had initial emissions of 400,000 tons of carbon per year, had post-test emissions of 320,000 tons of carbon per year. This represents a 20% reduction in carbon emissions. Impressive, right? Meanwhile, sample city D, which had initial emissions of 180,000, saw post-test emissions of 160,000, representing an 11% decrease in carbon emissions. The most important factor at play is most likely the fact that sample city B had much more significant initial carbon emissions than sample city D.

=== Bio Web of Conferences (2) ===
The BIO Web of Conferences conducted another similar study where they tested the carbon reduction based on the implementation of various initiatives. Green energy projects saw carbon emission reductions of 250,000 tons per year, while public transportation upgrades saw reductions of 320,000 tons per year, energy-efficient buildings saw reductions of 180,000 tons per year, and waste management improvements saw reductions of 150,000 tons per year. Clearly, all smart city initiatives have a positive environmental impact, with some being more substantial than others, such as high-frequency services, such as public transportation.

== Example demonstration projects ==
- http://www.dena.de
- http://www.superhomes.org.uk

== Sources of technical guidance ==
- http://www.herretrofitspace.com supports professional women in the retrofit industry in the UK
- http://www.energysavingtrust.org.uk
- http://www.ademe.fr
- nps.gov

== See also ==
General

- Architectural engineering
- Building science
- Deep energy retrofit
- Efficient energy use
- Environmental design
- Greening
- HOME STAR
- Net-zero emissions
- PACE financing
- Sustainable design

Energy and HVAC

- Efficient energy use
- Deep energy retrofit
- List of low-energy building techniques
- Low-energy house
- Zero-energy building
- Zero heating building

Indoor environmental quality

- Greening
- Healthy building
- Sick building syndrome

Material choices

- Building insulation material
- Deconstruction
- Environmental Product Declaration
- Insulated glazing
- Life-cycle assessment
- Sustainable architecture
- Sustainable materials management

Design standards

- BREEAM
- LEED
- Living Building Challenge
- Passive house
