= PACE financing =

US system for funding energy efficiency upgrades

PACE financing (property assessed clean energy financing) is a method used in the United States of America for financing energy efficiency upgrades, disaster resiliency improvements, water conservation measures, or renewable energy installations in existing or new construction of residential, commercial, and industrial property owners. Depending on state legislation, PACE financing can be used to fund water efficiency products, seismic retrofits, resiliency, and other measures with social benefits.

The business model of the residential PACE ("R-PACE") program has been criticized. The financial contracts are secured by a super-senior loan on the property, which takes priority over other common liens such as claims held by a mortgage lender. This can make it difficult for borrowers participating in the PACE program to obtain other, more traditional sources of financing (such as refinancing their home mortgage) or to sell their house. In addition, private contractors solicit homeowners to sign PACE contracts. Commercial PACE ("C-PACE") is widely accepted and enabled in most states, while R-PACE remains controversial and unavailable in most states (the exceptions being California and Florida). The super seniority structure of PACE also plays a role on the commercial side of the market and can also render it challenging for developers to raise traditional bank capital if they have a C-PACE loan.

Examples of energy efficiency and renewable energy upgrades range from adding more attic insulation to installing rooftop solar panels for residential projects and chillers, boilers, LED lighting and roofing for commercial projects. In areas with PACE legislation in place, governments offer a specific bond to investors or in the case of the open-market model, private capital providers purchase a tax lien from the taxing authority and provide financing to the building owners to put towards an energy retrofit. The financings are repaid over the selected term (over the course of somewhere between 5 and 35 years) via an annual assessment on their property tax bill. PACE bonds can be issued by municipal financing districts, state agencies or finance companies and the proceeds can be used to retrofit both commercial and residential properties. One of the most notable characteristics of PACE programs is that it is not structured as a traditional loan, but rather a property tax special assessment and financing is attached to the property rather than an individual. A PACE contract runs with the land and is therefore said to be nonrecourse to the property owner.

PACE can also be used to finance third-party owned systems financed through leases and power purchase agreements (PPAs). In this structure, the PACE property tax assessment is used to collect a lease payment of services fee. The primary benefit of this approach is that the financing does not rely upon property owner credit and the project costs may be lower due to the provider retaining the tax incentives and passing the benefit on to the property owner as a lower lease or services payment.

PACE programs help cities reach climate goals and property owners pay for the upfront costs of green initiatives, such as solar panels, which the property owner then pays back through a special non-ad valorem assessment on the property. This special assessment is set in such a way that the loan is fully repaid with interest in a fully amortizing fashion over the 5-35 year term, similar to the way most fixed-rate mortgage contracts are structured in the U.S. This allows property owners to begin saving on energy costs while they are paying for their solar panels. This usually means that property owners have net gains even with increased property tax.

== History ==
Voluntary assessments for repaying municipal bonds have been attached to property taxes since the early 1800s to fund projects for public good, such as sidewalks, fire stations, and street lighting. PACE uses the same concept, but for projects that benefit the private sector, or individual building owners. PACE was originally known as a "Special Energy Financing District" or "on-tax bill solar and efficiency financing." The concept was first conceived and proposed in the Monterey Bay Regional Energy Plan in 2005 but followed voter approval of a similar solar bonds program approved by San Francisco voters in 2001. The concept was designed to overcome one of the most significant barriers to solar and costly energy efficiency retrofits: up-front costs. A homeowner could spend tens of thousands of dollars on a solar photovoltaic system, upgrading windows to be more energy efficient or adding insulation throughout the home, yet all of these investments would not likely be recovered when the home was sold. PACE enables the homeowner to "mortgage" these improvements and pay only for the benefits they derive while they own the home.

The first PACE financing was implemented by Berkeley, California, led by Cisco DeVries, the chief of staff to Berkeley's mayor and then-CEO of RenewableFunding and Matthew Brown under the leadership of Dr. Kammen. University of California, Berkeley led the development of the program via the "Guide to Energy Efficiency & Renewable Energy Financing Districts for Local Governments" contributed by Cisco DeVries, Ann Livingston and Lestis Private Capital Group's Matthew Brown. The guide was funded through grants to the City of Berkeley from the U.S. Environmental Protection Agency. Berkeley's PACE program was recommended as an alternative to the solar bonds authority approved by neighboring San Francisco voters in 2001 in conjunction with the city's Community Choice Aggregation program, which is being implemented in both San Francisco and Sonoma counties. DeVries saw PACE as a way to provide a viable means to help achieve the Bay Area's climate goals. California passed the first legislation for PACE financing and started the BerkeleyFIRST climate program in 2008. Connecticut Green Bank established the first statewide program for commercial properties and Counterpointe established first statewide program for all properties in Florida. Since then, PACE-enabling legislation has been passed in all but 11 states allowing localities to establish PACE financing programs.

While commercial PACE has grown into a multibillion-dollar industry, PACE financing for residential properties was dealt a serious blow in the US in 2010 when Fannie Mae and Freddie Mac refused to back mortgages with PACE liens on them. In August 2015, the Department of Housing and Urban Development (HUD) announced that it intends to require liens created by energy retrofit programs to remain subordinate to loans guaranteed by the Federal Housing Administration (FHA) and that it would be issuing guidance on how to handle the transfer and sale of homes with a PACE assessment. HUD clarified its policy in 2017 by stating properties with PACE obligations were ineligible for FHA financing.

== Benefits ==
For a city, PACE can play an important role in reducing local greenhouse gas emissions, promoting energy efficiency improvements in its buildings, making the shift to renewable sources of energy more affordable, and reducing energy costs for residents and businesses. Because PACE is funded through assignment of tax lien to private capital or municipal bonds, it creates no liability to the city's funds. Additionally, most PACE programs made possible through public-private partnerships rely on private capital to source financing. PACE also enables states and local governments to design and implement such programs in their communities. PACE programs also help to create jobs and thus spur local economic development when local solar installers and renewable energy companies partner with the program. It is also an opt-in program, so only those property owners who choose to participate are responsible for the costs of PACE financing.

PACE enables individuals and businesses to defer the upfront costs that are the most common barrier to energy efficiency or renewables installations. The PACE loans are paid by additional assessments on the property owner's property taxes over an agreed upon term while energy costs are simultaneously lower, providing the PACE consumer with net gains. Also, because the solar panels and the PACE assessment is attached to the property, the consumer can sell the property leaving the debt to be paid through the property tax assessed on the subsequent owners. In Florida, where more of the loans are used to finance home-hardening measures like storm-resistant windows, PACE loans help keep homeowners insurance costs lower and can substantially raise the value of the property.

== Concerns about residential PACE financing ==
For consumers, PACE type programs have several problems if programs are not properly designed and administered. Because the financing is designed to stay with the property, eligibility is based primarily on property information rather than income and FICO scores. A homeowner's ability to pay is currently based primarily on their mortgage and property tax payment history as well as the requirement that there are no recent bankruptcies. Most significantly, homeowners are financed for the home improvements without any assessment of whether the financing is affordable for the homeowner, though Senate Bill 242, currently being considered in California, would require PACE providers to conduct an income review. Because the PACE financing is structured as a tax assessment instead of a loan, the PACE programs historically have not had to provide to homeowners the same disclosures about the financing costs that traditional lenders must provide. In September 2016, California Governor Jerry Brown signed AB2693 into law, which required PACE programs to provide mortgage-level disclosures and some providers to conduct live recorded calls with the homeowner to confirm financing terms and obligation. In some cases, without either an assessment of affordability or these disclosures about the costs of the financing, homeowners depend on what the PACE program providers tell them when trying to figure out whether the financing is affordable. Homeowners have complained that PACE contractors are lying about the costs of financing as part of selling the program. These problems create a situation in which homeowners can suddenly owe far more in property taxes than they can afford to repay; this is especially true for retired and disabled homeowners on fixed incomes. PACE architects Cisco DeVries and Matthew Brown deny these claims as "isolated incidents."

Interest rates for PACE programs are usually comparable to debt financing, with additional administrative fees 2-5%, which can often total more than $4000, but compare well to many lending options such as credit cards and HELOCs, without tying up credit lines. For instance, in Florida, the typical interest rate on an R-PACE loan is 7%, compared to home improvement equity loans which carry interest rates between 5% and 6%.

Many buyers and sellers have had difficulty with sales of homes with PACE tax assessments. Though the PACE assessment typically appears on the title report, some buyers find out about the assessments after the sale, which may force them to pay money out-of-pocket unexpectedly. In some cases, sellers have agreed to pay off the PACE assessment or lower the sale price to compensate for the PACE tax assessment. When the remaining payments are unable to be assumed by the new buyer, this relegates PACE financing to a position more similar to that of a traditional lending product.

Some homeowners have reported that there were massive differences in the lump sum payment required at the first assessment as well as far from the reported monthly costs which would show up as an increase in required escrow payments.

A problem with PACE for both residential consumers is that delinquent property tax payments with the PACE assessment take priority over other lien-holders, and those lien-holders may not be notified or given an opportunity to object. Commercial PACE is less problematic because priority lien-holders for those properties are notified beforehand. Fannie Mae and Freddie Mac have refused to purchase or underwrite loans for properties with existing PACE-based tax assessments, but in mid-2016 the Veterans Benefits Administration (VA) announced guidance for how to manage the financing of properties with PACE obligations. Properties encumbered with PACE obligations are not eligible for Federal Housing Administration (FHA) insured financing.

== Securitization ==
Bonds associated with PACE assessments can be packaged and securitized. Securitization works by pooling a series of assets and selling notes backed by these assets to investors. Because these bonds are for property improvements which achieve a positive environmental impact and PACE is a green bond. PACE bonds are unique amongst the green bond market because products rated as efficient are reducing carbon emissions as soon as they are installed.

== Locations with PACE legislation ==
PACE is enabled in 40 states and the District of Columbia, covering more than 80% of the U.S. population.

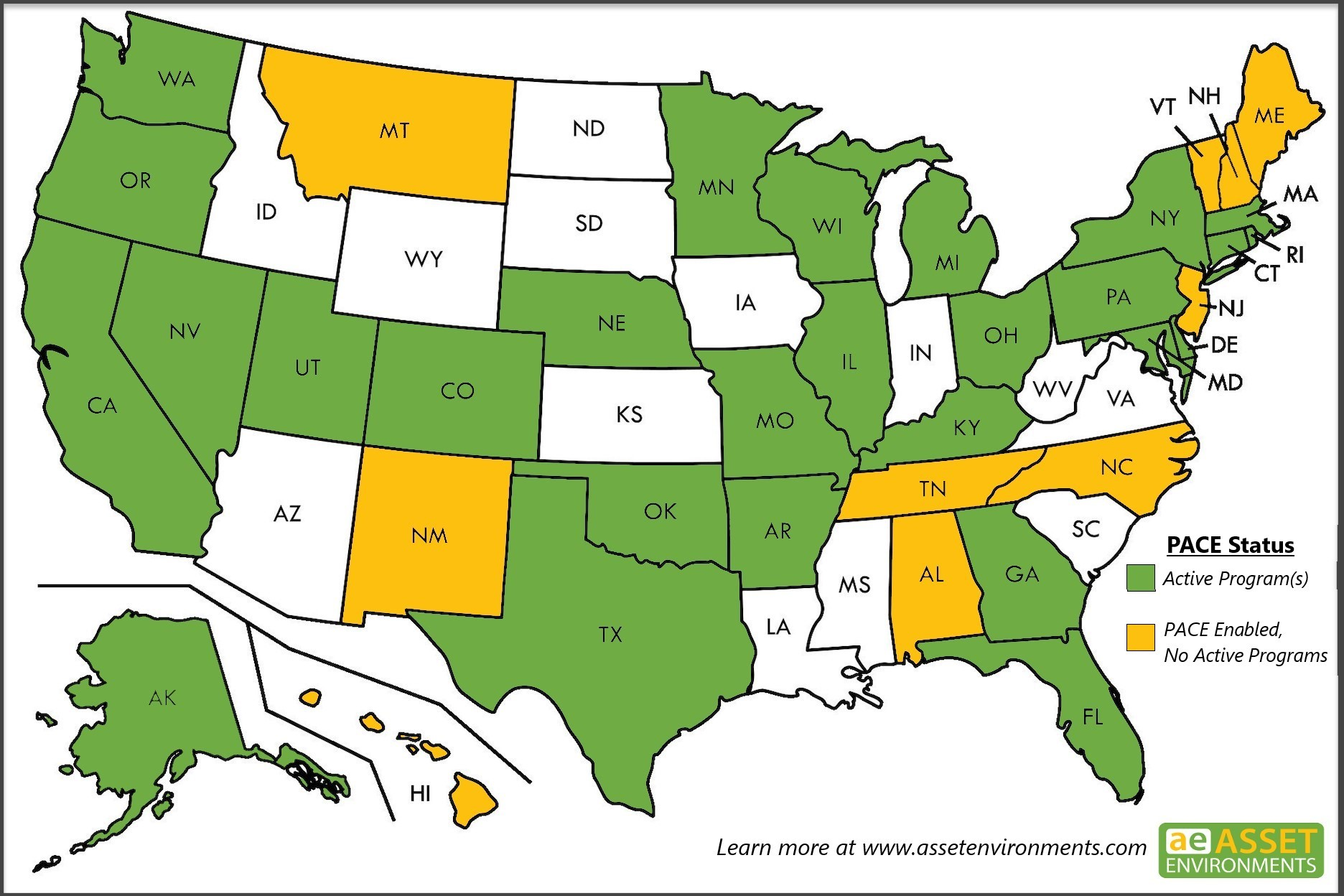
Original Map with updated PACE Financing Location Information

State	Status
Alaska	C-PACE available - no current programs
Arkansas	Available in some locations
California	Both R-PACE and C-PACE available
Colorado	Available
Connecticut	Available
District of Columbia	Available
Georgia	Under development
Florida	Both R-PACE and C-PACE available
Hawaii	Under development
Illinois	Available
Kentucky	Under development
Louisiana	Under development
Maine	Available in some areas
Maryland	Available
Massachusetts	Under development
Michigan	Available
Minnesota	Available
Missouri	R-PACE repealed in 2024.
Nebraska	Available in Omaha and Lincoln
Nevada	Under development in Las Vegas and Reno
New Hampshire	C-PACE under development
New Jersey	Available, but no current programs
New Mexico	Under development
New York	Available
North Carolina	Available, but no current programs
Ohio	Available
Oklahoma	Available, but no current programs
Oregon	Under development
Pennsylvania	Available in some areas
Rhode Island	Available
Texas	Available
Utah	Under development
Virginia	Available
Washington	Available
Wisconsin	Available
Wyoming	Available, but no current programs

== See also ==
- California v. Federal Housing Finance Agency
- Feed-in tariff
- RAEL
