= California Assembly Bill 811 (2008) =

California State Legislature
- Full name: Contractual Assessments: energy efficiency improvements
- Introduced: February 22, 2007
- Assembly voted: June 30, 2008
- Senate voted: June 26, 2008
- Signed into law: July 21, 2008
- Sponsor(s): Lloyd Levine
- Governor: Arnold Schwarzenegger
- Code: Streets and Highways Code
- Section: 5898.12, 5898.20, 5898.22, 5898.30 of, and to add Sections 5898.14 and 5898.21
- Website: http://info.sen.ca.gov/pub/07-08/bill/asm/ab_0801-0850/ab_811_bill_20080721_chaptered.pdf

Status: Current legislation

Contractual Assessments: energy efficiency improvements, Assembly Bill 811 (AB 811) is an environmental law in California signed into law by Governor of California Arnold Schwarzenegger on July 21, 2008. AB 811 was authored by Assemblyman Lloyd Levine.

AB 811 authorized all California cities and counties to designate areas within which willing property owners could enter into contractual assessments to finance the installation of distributed renewable energy generation, as well as energy efficiency improvements, that are permanently fixed to the property owner's residential, commercial, industrial, or other real property. These financing arrangements would allow property owners to finance renewable generation and energy efficiency improvements through low-interest loans that would be repaid as an item on the property owner's property tax bill. The contractual assessments could not be used to finance the purchase or installation of appliances that are not permanently fixed to the real property.

Assembly Bill 811 helps California municipalities accomplish the goals outlined by Global Warming Solutions Act of 2006

The passage of AB 811 makes it more imperative to provide an energy efficiency community program. AB 811 states: "This act is an urgency statute...". Cities and counties can now: (1) Make energy-efficiency and renewable energy affordable for California citizens (2) Increase property values (3) Improve the efficiency and indoor air quality of residential & commercial properties (4) Reduce the burning of dirty fuels and hence, pollution (5) Lower greenhouse gas emissions (6) Empower constituents with the fiscal security of distributed energy.

== See also ==
- Global Warming Solutions Act of 2006
- California Center for Sustainable Energy
- California Energy Commission
- California Environmental Protection Agency
- California Public Utilities Commission
- Ecology of California
- Global warming in California
- Million Solar Roofs
