= Armen Alchian =

American economist (1914–2013)

Armen A. Alchian
- Born: April 12, 1914; Fresno, California, U.S.
- Died: February 19, 2013 (aged 98); Los Angeles, California, U.S.

Academic background
- Education: Stanford University (BA, PhD)
- Influences: Adam Smith, Ludwig von Mises, Friedrich Hayek

Academic work
- Discipline: Microeconomics; Law and economics
- School or tradition: New Institutional Economics; Chicago School; Neoclassical economics
- Institutions: University of California, Los Angeles (1946–84); RAND Corporation (1946–64)
- Doctoral students: William F. Sharpe, David R. Henderson, Steven N. S. Cheung, Jerry Jordan
- Awards: Distinguished Fellow of the American Economic Association (1996)

Armen Albert Alchian (/ˈɑːltʃiən/; April 12, 1914 – February 19, 2013) was an American economist who made major contributions to microeconomic theory and the theory of the firm. He spent almost his entire career at the University of California, Los Angeles (UCLA), and is credited with turning its economics department into one of the country's best. He is also known as one of the founders of new institutional economics, and widely acknowledged for his work on property rights.

== Early life and education ==
Armen Albert Alchian was born on April 12, 1914, in Fresno, California, to Armenian-American parents. His father, Alexander H. Alchian (1884–1979), was born in Erzurum, Ottoman Empire and emigrated to the U.S. in 1901, while his mother Lily Normart (1889–1976) was born to Armenian immigrant parents in Fresno. Her parents were among the first Armenians to settle in the San Joaquin Valley and she was the first Armenian born in Fresno. His parents married in 1909, and Armen had a younger brother, Robert Haig Alchian (1917–1995). His father worked as a musician and a jeweler and the family was of "modest means." He grew up in the Armenian community, which was initially "subject to intense discrimination." He himself was reportedly subject to anti-Armenian discrimination early in his life. In the 1920s his family hosted General Andranik, an Armenian national hero, in their home for several months. Alchian was called "the Armenian Adam Smith" by Michael Intriligator.

Alchian attended Fresno High School, where he excelled academically and athletically. He initially enrolled in Fresno State College in 1932 and transferred to Stanford University in 1934, obtaining his bachelor's degree in 1936. He earned his PhD in philosophy from Stanford in 1943. His dissertation was titled "The Effects of Changes in the General Wage Structure." Anthony J. Culyer quoted Kenneth Arrow as saying that Alchian was the "brightest economics student Stanford ever had."

== Career ==
Alchian worked as a teaching assistant at Stanford (1937–40), and then in 1940–41 he worked at the National Bureau of Economic Research (NBER) and Harvard University and in 1942 at the University of Oregon as an instructor. He went on to serve in the Army Air Forces as a statistician between 1942 and 1946.

Alchian joined the Department of Economics at University of California, Los Angeles (UCLA) in 1946. He was initially assistant professor (until 1952), then associate professor (until 1958), and eventually named professor in 1958. He retired from UCLA in 1984 and was named professor emeritus of economics. It was not until 2007, at the age of 93, that he closed his campus office.

In classroom, Alchian adopted the Socratic method and disliked the traditional lecture method. James M. Buchanan, briefly a colleague in the late 1960s, classified Alchian as "the best blackboard economist" he had ever known. In 2006 John Riley, chair of the UCLA economics department, stated that Alchian was the "father of the modern-day economics department at UCLA, and set the future for it." William R. Allen noted that the department's "golden age" was from 1950 to 1980 because of Alchian's presence and leadership in the department.

Alchian was also affiliated with the RAND Corporation between 1946 and 1964 and was a consultant to business firms. At RAND, he is remembered for his work on the hidden costs of regulation. Alchian was the first economist to be employed at RAND and "became the conduit through which many Chicago stalwarts such as Ronald Coase, Gary Becker, and others received lucrative consultancies from RAND." Alchian was also involved for around 20 years with the Law and Economics Center, initially affiliated with the University of Rochester, which provided "insight into economic theory to legal scholars and judges." Timothy Muris opined that Alchian was "unexcelled in teaching economics to lawyers."

== Research ==
Alchian, an applied economist, has been described by Robert Higgs as a master of applied price theory. Alchian was a neoclassical economist, specifically of the Chicago School. Along with Harold Demsetz, Alchian is considered to be the founder of the "UCLA tradition", alternatively known as the Los Angeles School. Read explains: "Theirs is a school which shares some similarities with Chicago's emphasis on the free market, Harvard's tradition of institutional studies, and the strategic thrust of both the RAND Corporation and of the Hoover Institution, to which both contributed intellectually."

Alchian was also influenced by the Austrian School, especially by the ideas of Ludwig von Mises and Friedrich Hayek. He was influenced by Mises' Human Action (1949). Alchian famously interviewed Hayek in 1978, during which Alchian told him that he was particularly influenced by two of his articles: "Economics and Knowledge" (1937) and "The Use of Knowledge in Society" (1945). In his turn, Alchian has influenced contemporary Austrian School economists.

Alchian, along with James M. Buchanan and Ronald Coase, served as a bridge between the "Old" and "New" Chicago School. Boettke and Candela argue that these three economists founded the following branches in economics: New Institutional Economics, Law and Economics, and the economics of property rights. Indeed, Alchian is widely considered one of the founders of the New Institutional Economics. (Note: "Alchian not only remained a giant at the University of California Los Angeles. He was also viewed as a pioneer and co-founder of the New Institutional Economics revival, of which UCLA was at the center.") According to Robert Higgs Alchian had the greatest influence, aside from Coase, "in creating and fostering what has come to be known as the New Institutional Economics, one of the most notable improvements in mainstream economics during the past half century."

A large portion of Alchian's contribution is in property rights. (Note: "He devoted much of his career to studying property rights.") Henderson argued that Alchian has been most impactful on the economic analysis of property rights and summarized his work on it as follows: "You tell me the rules and I'll tell you what outcomes to expect." Alchian opined that "In essence, economics is the study of property rights over resources." Peter Boettke noted in 2015 that Alchian is "recognized as the founder of what was called 'property rights economics' in which he had to re-introduce to the economics profession the important role that property rights play in the determination of economic performance."

While working at RAND in 1954, Alchian conducted the first event study to infer what kind of fuel material was used in the development of hydrogen bombs, the construction of which were secret at the time. He successfully identified lithium as the fusion fuel through publicly available financial data, finding only the stock of Lithium Corporation of America suddenly increased around the hydrogen bomb test Castle Bravo. However, the paper was confiscated and destroyed because it was seen as a threat to national security.

=== Notable publications ===
Alchian was not prolific and did not author many books and articles. However, his few published works are widely cited. His writing style is characterized with lack of mathematical formality and is known for its straightforward prose. Harold Demsetz noted that his works are "largely uncluttered with mathematics." Henderson praised his clear writing, noting that Alchian was "one of the last economists of his generation to communicate mainly in words and not equations." According to Susan L. Woodward he "had no use for formal models that did not teach us to look somewhere new in the known world, nor had he any patience for findings that relied on fancy econometrics."

In 1964 Alchian and William R. Allen co-authored University Economics, an influential general textbook that has undergone six editions under two titles. It appeared in 1969 under the name Exchange and Production, and was published a third time in 2018 as Universal Economics. Mark Blaug described it as standing out "among all of its rivals by a consistent emphasis on the actual or potential role of markets as a device for organising economic life."

The collection of his works was first published in 1977 by Liberty Fund under the title Economic Forces at Work, which contains his main 18 papers. In 2006 Liberty Fund published The Collected Works of Armen A. Alchian in two volumes.

His most significant articles are:

- "Uncertainty, Evolution, and Economic Theory" (1950): It is Alchian's first major paper that brought him attention. Called one of the "most important contributions to the economic literature," the article "pioneered the idea that the price system is a Darwinian mechanism in which efficient behaviors survive, regardless of the motives of economic agents." According to Karl Brunner, Alchian "demonstrates that even in the absence of rational, profit maximizing or any purposive behavior the economic system produces a rational ordering of resource use patterns." James M. Buchanan described it as a "seminal" paper, which has a "genuinely innovative quality."
- "Reliability of Progress Curves in Airframe Production" (1963) was completed for the RAND Corporation by 1949, but was not published until 14 years later because it relied on military classified data. A pioneering work, Linda Argote and Dennis Epple noted that it stimulated interest in organizational learning curve, while Hubbard stated that it is "credited as the first empirical investigation of learning curves – an important feature of many industries."
- "Information Costs, Pricing and Resource Unemployment" (1969): Mark Blaug argued that it was the "beginning of all later 'job search' theories of unemployment." Alchian considered it his best paper.
- "Production, Information Costs, and Economic Organization" (1972)։ Coauthored with his former student Harold Demsetz, this is Alchian's most cited paper, and it is "credited with introducing the modern theory of the firm, the article looked at how problems associated with team production, such as shirking while leaving others to do the work, affect the organizational arrangements used by firms." It "has become the basis for much of current organization theory, which now concentrates on the issues of team production and incentives that they emphasized." Thomas N. Hubbard argues that it "may be the most influential paper in the economics of organization, catalyzing the development of the field as we know it."
  In 2011 it was chosen as one of the top 20 articles published in the American Economic Review between 1911 and 2011. In fact, it is the most cited of all papers published in the 100 years of existence of the American Economic Review and the 12th most cited economic paper overall between 1970 and mid-2006.

== Views ==
Alchian has been described as a classical liberal and libertarian. (Note: Anthony J. Culyer: "Politically, he was a libertarian.") He advocated laissez-faire principles and free-market individualism. He was a member of the Mont Pelerin Society. Axel Leijonhufvud argued that Alchian was skeptical of people who claim they will improve the world by using the powers of the government, but also those calling for abolishing government.

Alchian listed "self-reliance, independence, responsibility, integrity and trust" as the principles and rules of capitalism and argued that these are antithetical to socialism/communism. Alchian believed Keynesianism "totally neglects incentives." Alchian was a friend of Milton Friedman and Friedman often quoted him: "The one thing you can be most sure of in this life is that everyone will spend someone else's money more liberally than they will spend their own."

In the 1960s, Alchian told Eastern Bloc economists that they had to "introduce more private property rights to make markets work the way you think they should work" or else the market allocation will seem to be "perverse or deficient." David Riesman noted that Alchian, like Friedman and Hayek, was "confident about the causal relationships that run from evolution to capitalism, from capitalism to meliorism." One left-wing commentator described Alchian as an "ultra-liberal" economist who vigorously defended the idea that capitalism is characterised by the absence of any substantial power relations between individuals. Alchian was apparently influenced by neo-Darwinism. He, like Friedman, "invoked Darwinism to prove that the market economy is natural." Alchian was critical of minimum wage laws. During the 1970s energy crisis, Alchian argued for lifting of gas price controls.

Alchian famously asserted that "95% of the material in economics journals was wrong or irrelevant".

== Personal life ==
Alchian resided in Mar Vista, Los Angeles. In 1940 he married Pauline (née Crouse, 1916–2017), an elementary school teacher, who he had met at Stanford. They had two children: Arline Ann Hoel (born 1943) and Allen Alexander Alchian (born 1947).

Alchian was an "avid computer user" and an early adopter of email.

=== Personality ===
William R. Allen described Alchian as "almost always soft-spoken, unaggressive, and seemingly bemused" and noted that he "eschewed ambitious self-promotion and personal empire-building." Daniel Benjamin described him as "fundamentally kind, shy, compassionate, and humble." William F. Sharpe wrote that Alchian was "personally gentle and traditional," but was "clearly an eccentric economic theorist." Deirdre McCloskey described Alchian as "the soul of courtesy." She wrote that "talking about economics with Armen Alchian is like talking about painting with Pablo Picasso" and that his economics "comes from experience of life." Tom G. Palmer wrote of Alchian as a "sober scholar, but not so charismatic." Susan L. Woodward described him as a "warm and sentimental person." Roger Farmer described him as "selfless" and "amazing human being" who cared "only about promoting ideas." Steven N. S. Cheung wrote that he "never engaged in self-promotion, and he never cared about journal rankings" and was a "modest gentleman". He quoted Coase: "Alchian is classical in manners as well as in thought."

=== Golf ===
Alchian was a lifelong golfer and a regular visitor to the Rancho Park Golf Course. He often played golf with fellow economist George Stigler. He greatly admired the sport and wrote an opinion piece for The Wall Street Journal in 1977, in which he argued that golf is "not merely a sport. It is an activity, a lifestyle, a behavior, a manifestation of the essential human spirit. Golf's ethic, principles, rules and procedures of play are totally capitalistic. They are antithetical to socialism. Golf requires self-reliance, independence, responsibility, integrity and trust." He preferred to stay home and play golf than to partake in a conference called by President Gerald Ford to "Whip Inflation Now" as it would be "more productive than anything likely to be said in Washington."

=== Last years and death ===
One of his last public appearances was in May 2006 at an international conference at the UCLA, organized by Richard G. Hovannisian, on the challenges of sustainable development in Armenia, which was dedicated to Alchian. Around six years before his death Alchian's memory deteriorated according to Yoram Barzel. He suffered from a neurodegenerative disease in the last six years of his life. Alchian died of natural causes, in his sleep, at his home in Los Angeles on February 19, 2013, at the age of 98.

== Recognition and legacy ==
"[Armen Alchian], more than anyone else (and I would include Ronald Coase), made property rights, contracts and business practices in general into the field of study that they have now become."

— Axel Leijonhufvud

In 1984 Friedrich Hayek named Alchian and George Stigler his favorite economists "among the not really young ones." In 1985 Mark Blaug listed Alchian as one of the 100 "Great Economists Since Keynes". In a 2011 survey of around 300 U.S. economics professors, Alchian ranked 17th among favorite living economists older than 60, receiving the same points as Robert Fogel and Gordon Tullock. (Note: Alchian ranked fourth, behind Gordon Tullock, George Stigler, and Ludwig von Mises in a 2011 survey asking economists the following question: "One might think of a character-type of economist that is well represented by the following five economists: Adam Smith, Friedrich Hayek, Milton Friedman, Ronald Coase, and James Buchanan. For that character type, which five additional economists would you include in a top-ten list of representatives of that character type?") William R. Allen described him as "one of the superb economic analysts and teachers of the second half of the twentieth century." Walter E. Williams and Donald J. Boudreaux describe him as one of the top economists of the twentieth century and probably the greatest microeconomic theorist. (Note: Williams: "Professor Alchian is among the top 20th-century contributors to economic knowledge." "Professor Alchian was probably the greatest microeconomic theorist of the 20th century..." Boudreaux: "The world has lost two of the past century's greatest economists in as many months: Armen Alchian died this morning. [...] More later on this great economist – a scholar who, I believe, probably is history's greatest pure microeconomic theorist.")

=== Nobel Prize debate ===
Alchian never received a Nobel Prize, but numerous economists, such as Hayek, Harry Markowitz, (Note: "...One Google response was someone saying that Armen should get a Nobel Prize. I concur.") Michael Intriligator, (Note: Intriligator, who has known Alchian since 1962, said his colleague "would be a very good candidate for the Nobel Prize in economics.") William R. Allen, David R. Henderson, Donald J. Boudreaux, believe he deserved one. (Note: "Many of Alchian's students and friends believed that he well deserved a Nobel Prize in economics, but this recognition never came to him.": "At the end of the day, was the denial of Nobel status to Armen Alchian unjust? Yes, to many of us at least.") Hayek told Henderson in 1975: "There are two economists who deserve the Nobel prize because their work is important but won't get it because they didn't do a lot of work: Ronald Coase and Armen Alchian." (Note: Coase did receive a Nobel Prize, in 1991.) Allen nominated Alchian for the Nobel Prize in 1986 and characterized him as "a giant who, because of his lack of pretension, is easily overlooked by laymen and even by some supposed professionals—who has greatly honored his profession and uniquely contributed to its usefulness." Axel Leijonhufvud, who was a student and colleague of Alchian for thirty years, suggested in 1996 that "his lack of self-promotion and his abstentiousness from it I think is what more than anything else has kept him from the Nobel prize so far. I can find no other explanation of the behavior of my countrymen."

=== Influence ===
A number of economists have been influenced by Alchian, including several Nobel laurates. Kenneth Arrow was "personally and intellectually closely linked" with Alchian and the latter's influence played a crucial role on Arrow's introduction of the concept of "learning curve" into an economic growth model. James M. Buchanan was inspired by Alchian's work on free tuition. William F. Sharpe, who took a graduate course taught by Alchian in 1956, named him one of his three mentors, whose approach to research he had attempted to emulate. Sharpe called him a "brilliant mind grappling (usually very successfully) with the most difficult concepts in economics in thoroughly creative and innovative ways." Elinor Ostrom, an undergraduate student of Alchian, noted that as an institutional theorist, she "really appreciate[s] Alchian's approach" in the 1950 article "Uncertainty, Evolution, and Economic Theory". Walter E. Williams called him one of his "tenacious mentors." William R. Allen named Alchian one of the two individuals who had had the greatest influence on his life, calling him "an older brother." John Lott stated that University Economics was responsible for him becoming an academic and going to UCLA.

Other noted economists who were students of or were influenced by Alchian include Harold Demsetz, Steve Hanke, Henry Manne, Yoram Barzel, David Prychitko, Anthony J. Culyer, (Note: "Two people more than any have shaped my thinking in economics. One was Armen Alchian and the other Alan Williams.") Karl Brunner, (Note: "Alchian interviewed me for a possible appointment at UCLA. This was the beginning of a long friendship and a very productive intellectual exchange. This exchange shaped my thinking over the decades.") Arthur De Vany, Jerry Jordan, Douglas W. Allen, Axel Leijonhufvud, (Note: "Like others who have had the privilege of being Armen's students and colleagues, I have learned a great deal from his ideas.") Robert H. Topel.

Hubbard argues that Alchian's 1972 paper "Production, Information Costs, and Economic Organization" influenced works in the economics of organization by Bengt Holmström, Oliver Hart, and Paul Milgrom.

=== Honors ===
- Member of the Mont Pelerin Society (1957)
- President of the Western Economic Association International (1975)
- Fellow of the American Academy of Arts and Sciences (1978)
- Distinguished Fellow of the American Economic Association (1996)
- Adam Smith Award by the Association of Private Enterprise Education (2000)
- Honorary Fellow of the Institute of Economic Affairs

Honorary doctorates

- University of Rochester (1983)
- Universidad Francisco Marroquín (2010)

Tributes

- The Armen A. Alchian Chair in Economic Theory at UCLA was established in July 1997.
- The Armenian Economic Association presents the Armen Alchian Award since 2014.

== Selected works ==
=== Articles ===
- Alchian, Armen A. (1950). "Uncertainty, Evolution, and Economic Theory". Journal of Political Economy. 58 (3): 211–21. doi:10.1086/256940.
- — (1963). "Reliability of Progress Curves in Airframe Production". Econometrica. 31 (4): 679–93. doi:10.2307/1909166. JSTOR 1909166.
- — (1965). "Some Economics of Property Rights". Il Politico. 30 (4): 816–29. JSTOR 43206327.
- —; Demsetz, Harold (1972). "Production, Information Costs, and Economic Organization". American Economic Review. 62 (5): 777–95. JSTOR 1815199.
- —; Demsetz, Harold (1973). "The Property Right Paradigm". Journal of Economic History. 33 (1): 16–27. doi:10.1017/S0022050700076403.
- —; Klein, Benjamin; Crawford, Robert G. (1978). "Vertical Integration, Appropriable Rents, and the Competitive Contracting Process". Journal of Law & Economics. 21 (2): 297–326. doi:10.1086/466922.
- —; Woodward, Susan (1988). "The Firm is Dead; Long Live the Firm: A Review of Oliver Williamson's The Economic Institutions of Capitalism". Journal of Economic Literature. 26 (1): 65–79. JSTOR 2726609.
