= Western Economic Association International =

- Formation: 1922
- Legal status: 501(c)3 California Corporation
- Purpose: Encourage economic research and discussion, freedom in discussion, and issuance of publications for dissemination of research
- Headquarters: Fountain Valley, California, U.S.
- Region served: Worldwide
- Members: 1,500 Individuals and 40 Institutions
- Executive Director: Wade E. Martin, PhD
- Main organ: Executive Board

Founded in 1922, Western Economic Association International (WEAI) is a non-profit academic society dedicated to the encouragement and dissemination of economic research and analysis. WEAI's principal activities include the publishing of two quarterly journals, and the staging of conferences.

== Purpose ==
From WEAI's 2009 Bylaws: "The purposes and objectives for which the Western Economic Association International is formed shall be: (a) the encouragement of economic research and discussion; (b) the encouragement of freedom in economic discussion; and (c) the issuance of publications for the purpose of disseminating knowledge on economic subjects. The corporation shall take no partisan attitude, nor will it commit its Members to any position on theoretical or practical economic questions."

== Journals ==
=== Economic Inquiry ===
Published since 1962, (formerly Western Economic Journal), EI is a highly regarded scholarly journal in economics, publishing articles of general interest across the profession. Besides containing research on all economics topic areas, a principal objective is to make each article understandable to economists who are not necessarily specialists in the article's topic area. EI was one of the first journals to publish humor papers (now called Miscellany) with the still highly downloaded article "Life Among the Econ" by Axel Leijonhufvud, and more recently "The Theory of Interstellar Trade: by Paul Krugman. In 2007, then editor R. Preston McAfee introduced the innovative No Revisions policy for submitted manuscripts. Published in cooperation with Wiley-Blackwell, EI's worldwide circulation is approximately 15,800. Tim Salmon, Southern Methodist University, is the current editor.

=== Contemporary Economic Policy ===
First published in 1982 as Contemporary Policy Issues, Contemporary Economic Policy publishes scholarly research and analysis on important policy issues facing society. CEP publishes essays analyzing specific policy issues, surveys of important general subject areas, and research articles devoted to developing new methods for policy analysis. Published in cooperation with Wiley-Blackwell, CEP's worldwide circulation is approximately 15,400. Brad Humphreys, West Virginia University, is the current editor.

== Conferences ==
=== Annual Conferences ===
Held each summer between mid-June and mid-July, WEAI Annual Conferences provide the opportunity for more than 1,000 economists from around the world to meet and exchange ideas. An average of 300 concurrent sessions are held with participants presenting individual research papers, serving as discussants for papers, chairing sessions, and also organizing entire sessions on the topics of their choice. Other academic societies with similar objectives to WEAI participate as Allied Societies regularly holding sessions and sometimes their own annual meetings in conjunction with WEAI conferences. Conference highlights include the Annual WEAI Presidential Address as well as the Association's newest member-sponsored program, the Graduate Student Dissertation Workshop.

=== International Conferences ===
Held since 1994 in cities like Hong Kong, Taipei, Bangkok, Sydney, Beijing, Kyoto, Brisbane, Santiago, Singapore, Newcastle, and Tokyo, the International Conferences have become a highly successful marketplace of ideas for economists from around the world. Partnerships have been established in the organizing of these conferences with universities and organizations such as Keio University, University of Newcastle, Pontifical Catholic University of Chile, Queensland University of Technology School of Business, Ryukoku University, Guanghua School of Management Peking University, Academia Sinica, and Hong Kong Economic Association. A smaller format than the Annual Conference, the International Conference program generally consists of 80 to 100 sessions including 300 to 600 economists serving as paper presenters, discussants, chairs, and session organizers. Keynote speakers include Nobel Laureates such as James Heckman, Ken Arrow, Robert Engle, Daniel McFadden, and Peter Diamond.

== Past, Present, and Future WEAI Presidents ==
Asterisk (*) indicates recipient of the Sveriges Riksbank Prize in Economic Sciences in Memory of Alfred Nobel

- 1922 Alfred C. Schmitt
- 1923 Eliot Jones
- 1924 Rockwell D. Hunt
- 1925 Howard T. Lewis
- 1926 Edwin C. Robbins
- 1927 Theodore H. Boggs
- 1928 Ira B. Cross
- 1929 Howard S. Nobel
- 1930 Thomas A. Beal
- 1931 John A. Bexell—Kenneth Duncan (Acting Pres.)
- 1932 Shirley J. Coon
- 1933 Clement Akerman
- 1934 Reid L. McClung
- 1935 W. L. Wanlass—Glenn E. Hoover (Acting Pres.)
- 1936 Kenneth Duncan
- 1937 John B. Canning
- 1938 James K. Hall
- 1939 Richard B. Heflebower
- 1940 Arthur G. Coons
- 1941 Robert D. Calkins
- 1942 Bernard F. Haley—James H. Gilbert (Acting Pres.)
- 1943-5 James H. Gilbert
- 1946 John B. Condliffe
- 1947 William S. Hopkins
- 1948 Robert G. Pettengill
- 1949 Glenn E. Hoover
- 1950 Dilworth Walker
- 1951 John A. Guthrie
- 1952 Oliver P. Wheeler
- 1953 M. M. Stockwell
- 1954 Clifford E. Maser
- 1955 Gault W. Lynn
- 1956 Kenneth L. Trefftzs
- 1957 Floyd A. Bond
- 1958 Frank L. Kidner
- 1959 Paul L. Kleinsorge
- 1960 J. Fred Weston
- 1961 Ralph I. Thayer
- 1962 William O. Jones
- 1963 Wytze Gorter
- 1964 Phillip W. Cartwright
- 1965 George Cady
- 1966 Paul Simpson
- 1967 G. N. Rostvold
- 1968 Dean A. Worcester
- 1969 Walter J. Mead
- 1970 Charles B. Friday
- 1971 William R. Allen
- 1972 Thomas R. Saving
- 1973 Earl R. Rolph
- 1974 Karl Brunner
- 1975 Armen Alchian
- 1976 Douglass North*
- 1977 H. Scott Gordon
- 1978 Howard Bowen
- 1979 Thomas Mayer
- 1980 Donald F. Gordon
- 1981 Kenneth J. Arrow*
- 1982 M. Bruce Johnson
- 1983 Abba P. Lerner—James M. Buchanan* (Acting Pres.)
- 1984 James M. Buchanan*
- 1985 Milton Friedman*
- 1986 Allan H. Meltzer
- 1987 Robert W. Clower
- 1988 Anna Schwartz
- 1989 Moses Abramovitz
- 1990 Arnold Harberger
- 1991 Vernon L. Smith*
- 1992 Walter Y. Oi
- 1993 Jack Hirshleifer
- 1994 Michael C. Jensen
- 1995 Gordon Tullock
- 1996 Harold Demsetz
- 1997 Gary Becker*
- 1998 Steven N. S. Cheung
- 1999 Charles Plott
- 2000 Oliver E. Williamson*
- 2001 Michael R. Darby
- 2002 Yoram Barzel
- 2003 Clive Granger*
- 2004 Janet Yellen
- 2005 Robert Barro
- 2006 Gary Libecap
- 2007 James Heckman*
- 2008 Paul Milgrom*
- 2009 Michael D. Intriligator
- 2010 Ronald W. Jones
- 2011 Paul A. David
- 2012 Richard Easterlin
- 2013 Lucian A. Bebchuk
- 2014 George G. Kaufman
- 2015 John Pencavel
- 2016 David Card*
- 2017 Peter Diamond*
- 2018 Orley Ashenfelter
- 2019 Daniel McFadden*
- 2020 John Shoven
- 2021 Alan Auerbach
- 2022 Christina Romer
- 2023 Dora Costa
- 2024 Janet Currie
- 2025 Nancy Rose
- 2026 Maurice Obstfeld
- 2027 Caroline Hoxby

== Historical Timeline ==
- 1922: First meeting held in Portland, organized by Alfred C. Schmidt as the Pacific Association of Collegiate Schools of Business and Departments of Economics. The association was originally formed to gather institutions together to discuss challenges and ideas for improvement in academia.
- 1925: Conference renamed to Pacific Collegiate Economic and Commercial Conference.
- 1928: Organization renamed to Pacific Coast Economic Association.
- 1930: First conference held that included individual research papers, thus beginning the format used today.
- 1933: First bylaws issued establishing individual association memberships.
- 1942-45: Conferences suspended due to WWII.
- 1962: Western Economic Journal first issued.
- 1971: Association name changed to Western Economic Association.
- 1977: WEJ name changed to Economic Inquiry.
- 1982: Contemporary Policy Issues first issued.
- 1994: First Pacific Rim conference held in Hong Kong.
- 1994: CPI name changed to Contemporary Economic Policy.
- 2019: Largest annual conference to date with 379 sessions.
- 2022: First hybrid conference held June 29-July 3 in Portland, Oregon.
