= David R. Henderson =

Canadian-American economist (born 1950)

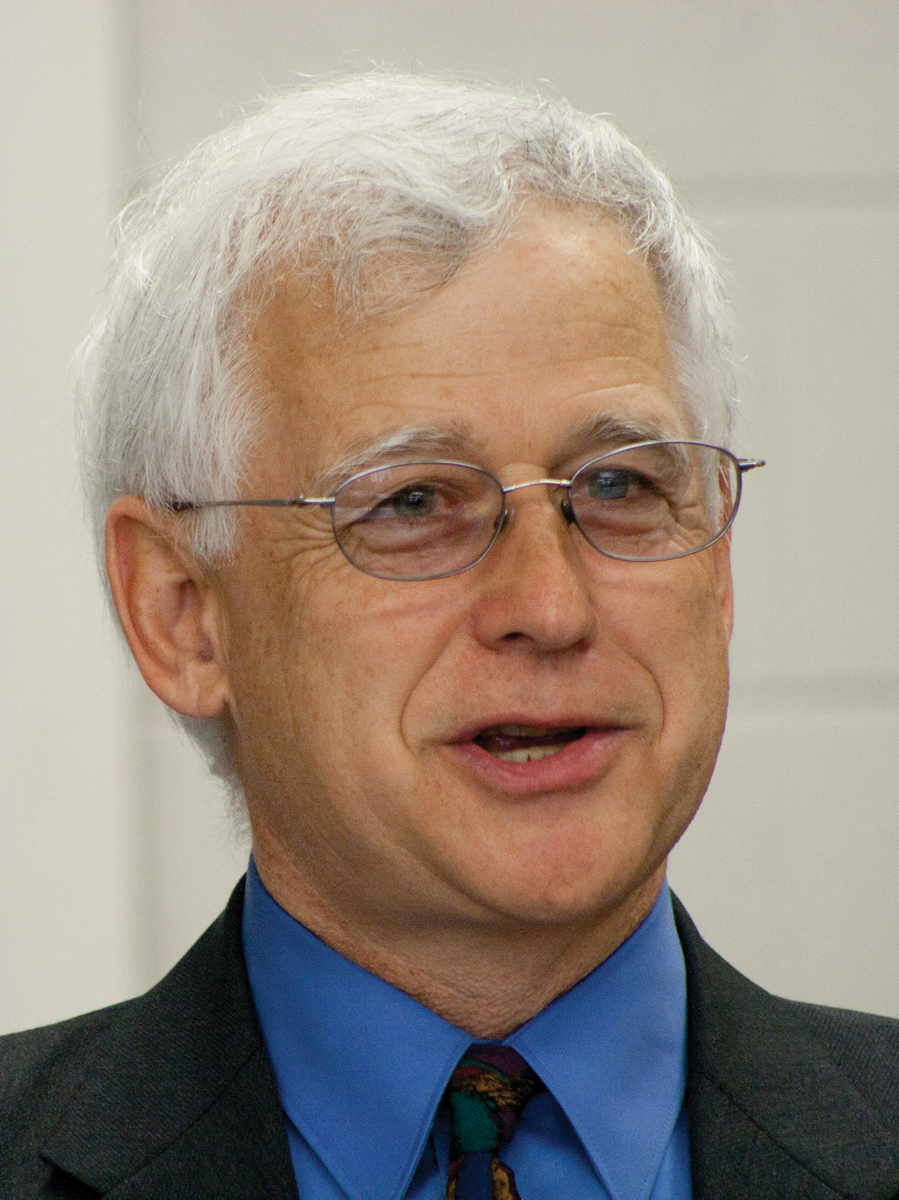
- Henderson in 2011
- Born: David Richard Henderson; November 21, 1950 (age 75); Boissevain, Manitoba, Canada

Academic background
- Education: University of Winnipeg (BSc); University of California, Los Angeles (MA, PhD)
- Influences: Armen Alchian, Milton Friedman, Adam Smith, Karl Marx, John Maynard Keynes, Ayn Rand

Academic work
- Discipline: Economics
- Institutions: Naval Postgraduate School

David Richard Henderson (born November 21, 1950) is a Canadian-born American economist and author who moved to the United States in 1972 and became a U.S. citizen in 1986, serving on President Ronald Reagan's Council of Economic Advisers from 1982 to 1984. A research fellow at Stanford University's Hoover Institution since 1990, he took a teaching position with the Naval Postgraduate School in Monterey, California in 1984, and is now an emeritus professor of economics.

== Education ==
Henderson earned his B.Sc. (1970) from the University of Winnipeg, followed by his M.A. and Ph.D.(1976) in Economics from UCLA. Henderson's areas of scholarly interest include microeconomics, cost–benefit analysis, health economics, energy economics, and the economics of taxation.

== Career ==
A friend of economist Milton Friedman since they first met at the University of Chicago in 1970, Henderson took his advice to "make politics an avocation, not a vocation," pursuing a career course that led to earning a Ph.D. in economics. Henderson first taught at the University of Rochester, Graduate School of Management, from 1975 to 1979. Next, he took a position at San Francisco-based Cato Institute from 1979 to 1980, and then a short stint at Santa Clara University from 1980 to 1981. In 1982, Henderson joined President Reagan's administration as a senior economist with the Council of Economic Advisers, serving as senior economist for health policy from 1982 to 1984 and then senior economist for energy policy from 1983 to 1984. Henderson wrote about socioeconomic issues for 17 years at the blog EconLog, along with Bryan Caplan, which The Wall Street Journal designated as one of the top 25 economics blogs in 2009. In August 2025 who moved to blogging at Substack. He stated that: "The big advantage of my Substack is that I have total control over subject matter and content."

Henderson has written articles appearing in publications such as The New York Times, The Wall Street Journal, Forbes, Los Angeles Times, Chicago Tribune, Barron's, Fortune, The Freeman, The Public Interest, and The Christian Science Monitor. Henderson was the economics editor for the National Review the "Wartime Economist" for Antiwar.com and a contributing editor for Reason magazine He is a Senior Fellow with the Vancouver-based Fraser Institute. He has appeared on C-SPAN, The O'Reilly Factor, CNN, MSNBC, RT, the Jim Lehrer Newshour and the John Stossel TV show, along with numerous radio shows and interviews with the BBC, KQED-FM, NPR and local radio affiliates. Henderson has testified before the House Ways and Means Committee, the Senate Armed Services Committee, and the Senate Committee on Labor and Human Resources. A number of his research articles have appeared in scholarly journals, including Journal of Monetary Economics, The Independent Review, Cato Journal, Regulation, Journal of Policy Analysis and Management, The Energy Journal , and Contemporary Economic Policy.

== Awards ==
- Rear Admiral John Jay Schieffelin Award for Excellence in Instruction at the Naval Postgraduate School, 1997
- Louis D. Liskin Award for Excellence in Teaching, June 2003, June 2004, and June 2007, Graduate School of Business and Public Policy

== Books and publications ==
- The Fortune Encyclopedia of Economics; New York: Warner Books, editor, 1994
- The Joy of Freedom: An Economist's Odyssey; Upper Saddle River, NJ: Financial Times (Prentice Hall), 2001
- Making Great Decisions in Business and Life, with Charles L. Hooper; Chicago Park: CA, Chicago Park Press; 1st edition, 2007
- The Concise Encyclopedia of Economics, editor. Indianapolis, IN: Liberty Fund, Inc., 2008 ISBN 978-0865976665
- "The Supply-Side Tax Revenue Effects of the Child Care Tax Credit," Journal of Policy Analysis and Management, Vol. 8, No. 4 (Autumn, 1989), pp. 673–675
- "A Humane Economist's Case for Drug Legalization," UC Davis Law Review, University of California, Davis, Vol. 24, 1991, pp. 655–676
- "Lessons of East Asia's economic growth," Obits, Foreign Policy Research Institute, Volume 41, Issue 3, Summer, July 1, 1997, pp. 427–443
- "Do We Need to Go to War for Oil?" Independent Policy Reports, Independent Institute, September 1, 2007
