= Michael Intriligator =

American economist

Michael D. Intriligator
- Born: February 5, 1938; Freeport, New York, US
- Died: June 23, 2014 (aged 76); Los Angeles, California, US

Academic background
- Education: Yale University; MIT
- Doctoral advisor: Robert M. Solow

Academic work
- Discipline: Economics
- Institutions: University of California, Los Angeles
- Website: Information at IDEAS / RePEc

Notes
- Thesis Essays on productivity and savings. (1963)

Michael D. Intriligator (February 5, 1938 – June 23, 2014) was an American economist at the University of California, Los Angeles, where he was Professor of Economics, Political Science, and Policy Studies, and co-director of the Jacob Marschak Interdisciplinary Colloquium on Mathematics in the Behavioral Sciences. In addition, he was a Senior Fellow at the Milken Institute in Santa Monica, a Senior Fellow of the Gorbachev Foundation of North America in Boston, a Foreign Member of the Russian Academy of Science, and a Fellow of the American Association for the Advancement of Science. He received his Ph.D. in economics at MIT in 1963 and the same year joined the UCLA Department of Economics. He taught courses in economic theory, econometrics, mathematical economics, international relations, and health economics, and received several distinguished teaching awards.

His research interests were mathematical economic theory; applications of quantitative economics to strategy and arms control; health economics; and the future of the Russian economy. His most significant academic collaborations were with economists such as Kenneth Arrow, Dagobert Brito, and Zvi Griliches. His influential 1971 book, "Mathematical Optimization and Economic Theory" brought previously inaccessible mathematical techniques into the mainstream of the field.

Intriligator is regarded as an important figure in peace economics. He served on the Research Committee of the Institute for Economics and Peace from 2009 until his death, and held leadership roles in Economists for Peace and Security. He served on the United States Institute of Peace International Network for Economics and Conflict.

Intriligator was co-founder and co-editor of the Handbooks in Economics series He was active in public policy debates, making many policy recommendations, especially for economic and national security policy.

He was married for more than 50 years to Devrie Intriligator, a space physicist. He fathered four sons: Kenneth, James, William, Robert.

== Selected bibliography ==
Books

- Intriligator, Michael D.; Arrow, Kenneth J. (1981). Handbook of mathematical economics. Handbook of Economics Series. Amsterdam New York, New York: Elsevier North-Holland. ISBN 9780444861269.

Journal articles

- Intriligator, Michael D.; Arrow, Kenneth J.; Harberger, Arnold C.; Wolf, Jr., Charles; Tullock, Gordon (April 1993). "Economic integration and the future of the nation-state". Contemporary Economic Policy. 11 (2): 1–22. doi:10.1111/j.1465-7287.1993.tb00376.x.
- Intriligator, Michael D. (Spring 1994). "Global security after the end of the Cold War". Conflict Management and Peace Science. 13 (2): 101–111. doi:10.1177/073889429401300201. S2CID 154263063.
- Intriligator, Michael D. (April 1994). "Privatisation in Russia has led to criminalisation". Australian Economic Review. 27 (2): 4–14. doi:10.1111/j.1467-8462.1994.tb00830.x.
- Intriligator, Michael D. (June 2004). "Globalization of the world economy: potential benefits and costs and a net assessment". Journal of Policy Modeling. 26 (4): 485–498. doi:10.1016/j.jpolmod.2004.04.004. S2CID 15062148.
- Intriligator, Michael D.; Coulomb, Fanny; Hartley, Keith (October 2008). "Pacifism in economic analysis: a historical perspective" (PDF). Defence and Peace Economics. 19 (5): 373–386. doi:10.1080/10242690802354378. S2CID 154439943.
- Intriligator, Michael D. (January 2010). "The economics of terrorism". Economic Inquiry. 48 (1): 1–13. doi:10.1111/j.1465-7295.2009.00287.x. S2CID 153448969.
- Intriligator, Michael D. (January 2011). "Peace science and peace economics can help win the fight against nuclear proliferation". Peace Economics, Peace Science, and Public Policy. 16 (2): 1–10. doi:10.2202/1554-8597.1217. S2CID 155035955.
- Intriligator, Michael D.; Bilmes, Linda (May 2013). "How many wars is the US fighting today?". Peace Economics, Peace Science, and Public Policy. 19 (1): 8–16. doi:10.1515/peps-2013-0011. S2CID 153357991.
- Intriligator, Michael D. (January 2015). "Energy security in the Asia-Pacific region". Contemporary Economic Policy. 33 (1): 221–227. doi:10.1111/coep.329. S2CID 152832635.
