= Charles Lipson =

American professor emeritus of political science ar University of Chicago

Charles H. Lipson (born February 1, 1948) is an American political scientist who is professor emeritus of political science at the University of Chicago. His areas of specialization include international relations, international political economy and modern international history.

== Education ==
Born and raised in Marks, Mississippi, Lipson attended Yale as an undergraduate, where he studied Political Science and Economics. He received a Master of Arts degree and a doctoral degree from Harvard University.

While studying at Harvard, Lipson won the Chase Prize for the best essay on a subject relating to the promotion of world peace.

== Career ==
Charles Lipson has taught at the University of Chicago since 1977. His research focuses on international cooperation and conflict and political aspects of international trade, debt, and investment. In addition to his political science publications, Lipson writes books on academic integrity, adjusting to college and doing research that are broadly applicable to students of all academic interests.

Lipson is the co-founder and director of the Program on International Politics, Economics, and Security (PIPES), a weekly workshop for graduate students to discuss research issues in international politics.

In 1991, he served as the Secretary of the American Political Science Association

== Publications ==
=== Books ===
Book	Year	Type	Published	ISBN
Standing Guard: Protecting Foreign Capital in the Nineteenth and Twentieth Centuries	1985	Non-fiction	University of California Press	978-0520034686
Reliable Partners: How Democracies Have Made a Separate Peace	2003	Non-fiction	Princeton University Press	978-0691113906
How to Write a BA Thesis: A Practical Guide from Your First Ideas to Your Finished Paper	2005	Non-fiction	University of Chicago Press	978-0226484648
Doing Honest Work in College: How to Prepare Citations, Avoid Plagiarism, and Achieve Real Academic Success 2nd ed.	2008	Non-fiction	University of Chicago Press	978-0226484778
Cite Right: A Quick Guide to Citation Styles—MLA, APA, Chicago, the Sciences, Professions, and More2nd ed	2011	Non-fiction	University Of Chicago Press	978-0226484648

In the book, Reliable Partners: How Democracies Have Made a Separate Peace (2003), Lipson examines "why democracies do not fight wars against each other."

Lipson has also edited several books on international politics:

- Rational Design of International Institutions, ed. by Barbara Koremenos, Charles Lipson, and Duncan Snidal (Cambridge: Cambridge University Press, 2004).
- Theory and Structure in International Political Economy: An International Organization Reader, ed. by Charles Lipson and Benjamin J. Cohen (Cambridge, MA: MIT Press, 1999)
- Issues and Agents in International Political Economy: An International Organization Reader, ed. by Benjamin J. Cohen and Charles Lipson (Cambridge, MA: MIT Press, 1999)

=== Editorials ===
Lipson has contributed editorials to the Chicago Tribune.

== Media appearances ==
In 2013, Lipson frequently appeared as a guest on Beyond the Beltway with Bruce DuMont, a nationally syndicated radio show that provides listeners with weekly political discussions. He also appeared on Pritzker Military Presents Front & Center in 2004.

== Awards ==
In 2011, Lipson received the Quantrell Award for Excellence in Undergraduate Teaching from the University of Chicago.
