= Nirvana fallacy =

Informal fallacy in comparing actualities with ideals

This statute depicts the Buddha in parinirvana, a state of after-death nirvana.

The nirvana fallacy is the informal fallacy of comparing actual things with unrealistic, idealized alternatives. It can also refer to the tendency to assume there is a perfect solution to a particular problem. A closely related concept is the "perfect solution fallacy".

By creating a false dichotomy that presents one option which is obviously advantageous—while at the same time being completely unrealistic—a person using the nirvana fallacy can attack any opposing idea because it is imperfect. Under this fallacy, the choice is not between real world solutions; it is, rather, a choice between one realistic achievable possibility and another unrealistic solution that could in some way be "better".

== History ==
In La Bégueule (1772), Voltaire wrote Le mieux est l'ennemi du bien, which is often translated as "The perfect is the enemy of the good" (literally: "The best is the enemy of the good").

The nirvana fallacy was given its name by economist Harold Demsetz in 1969, who said:

The view that now pervades much public policy economics implicitly presents the relevant choice as between an ideal norm and an existing "imperfect" institutional arrangement. This nirvana approach differs considerably from a comparative institution approach in which the relevant choice is between alternative real institutional arrangements.

== Perfect solution fallacy ==
The perfect solution fallacy is a related informal fallacy that occurs when an argument assumes that a perfect solution exists or that a solution should be rejected because some part of the problem would still exist after it were implemented. This is an example of black and white thinking, in which a person fails to see the complex interplay between multiple component elements of a situation or problem, and, as a result, reduces complex problems to a pair of binary extremes.

It is common for arguments which commit this fallacy to omit any specifics about exactly how, or how badly, a proposed solution is claimed to fall short of acceptability, expressing the rejection only in vague terms. Alternatively, it may be combined with the fallacy of misleading vividness, when a specific example of a solution's failure is described in emotionally powerful detail but base rates are ignored (see availability heuristic).

The fallacy is a type of false dilemma.

=== Examples ===
Posit (fallacious)
These anti-drunk driving ad campaigns are not going to work. People are still going to drink and drive no matter what.

Rebuttal
Complete eradication of drunk driving is not the expected outcome. The goal is reduction.

Posit (fallacious)
Seat belts are a bad idea. People are still going to die in car crashes.

Rebuttal
While seat belts cannot make driving 100% safe, they do reduce one's likelihood of dying in a car crash.

Posit (fallacious)
We should not place a ban on panhandlers on our business' premises. People will still beg on our property.

Rebuttal
While a ban will not reduce the number of panhandlers on one's property to zero, its enforcement will reduce and discourage panhandlers entering the premises.

Posit (fallacious)
Medical testing on animals is useless. The drug thalidomide passed animal tests but resulted in horrific birth defects when used by pregnant women.

Rebuttal
This popular argument ignores all the thousands of drugs that failed animal testing, any number of which could have harmed humans. In the case of thalidomide, no testing was performed on pregnant animals; had this not been the case, the effect on pregnant women could have been foreseen.

== See also ==
- Appeal to consequences
- Appeal to worse problems
- Cutting off the nose to spite the face
- Emotional memory
- Optimism bias
- Perfect is the enemy of good
- Politician's syllogism
- Pollyanna principle
- Wishful thinking
