= Karl Brunner (economist) =

Swiss economist (1916–1989)

- Born: February 16, 1916; Zurich, Switzerland
- Died: May 9, 1989 (aged 73); Rochester, New York, US

Academic background
- Education: University of Zurich; University of California Los Angeles

Academic work
- Discipline: Monetary economics
- School or tradition: Monetarism
- Institutions: University of Rochester

Karl Brunner (/ˈbrʊnər/ BRUUN-ər, German: [karl ˈbrʊnər]; 16 February 1916 – 9 May 1989) was a Swiss economist.

== Biography ==
Karl Brunner was born in Zürich on 16 February 1916. He studied economics at the University of Zürich from 1934 to 1937, and at the London School of Economics from 1937 to 1938, before returning to the University of Zürich, where he received a doctorate in 1943. He served briefly as an economist at the Swiss National Bank, and as a lecturer and research assistant at the University of St. Gallen. He left Switzerland in 1949 to take up a position as a visiting fellow at the Cowles Commission, then based at the University of Chicago. After a two-year fellowship, Brunner moved to Los Angeles in 1951 to begin an academic career at the University of California, Los Angeles, where, in 1961, he was appointed a full professor. In 1966, he was appointed a professor at Ohio State University, before moving to the University of Rochester in 1971. In the 1970s, Brunner frequently returned to Europe, where he accepted a professorship at the University of Konstanz in Germany (1969–1973) and subsequently at the University of Bern in Switzerland (1974–1985). In 1979, Brunner was named the Fred H. Gowen Professor of Economics at the University of Rochester, a position he held until his death on 9 May 1989.

Over the course of 43 years, Karl Brunner wrote 87 journal articles and 4 books, edited or co-edited 36 volumes, contributed 71 articles to books, volumes, conferences and Congressional hearings, and left behind 12 unpublished papers. He founded two leading academic journals, the Journal of Money, Credit, and Banking (in 1969) and the Journal of Monetary Economics (in 1973). He also organised the Konstanz, Interlaken and Carnegie-Rochester meetings (with Allan Meltzer), and co-founded the Shadow Open Market Committee (in 1973, again with Meltzer).

To commemorate the 100th anniversary of his birthday, the Swiss National Bank started the Karl Brunner Distinguished Lecture Series in 2016. The first lecture was given by Ken Rogoff in Zürich.

== Monetarism ==
In 1968, Brunner introduced the term monetarism into the mainstream vocabulary of economics. Fundamentally, Brunner conceived monetarism as the application of relative-price theory to the analysis of aggregate phenomena. In his interview with Arjo Klamer, he notably claimed that: "the basic tenet of monetarism is the reassertion of the relevance of price theory to understand what happens in aggregate economics. Our fundamental point is that price theory is a crucial paradigm – as a matter of fact, the only paradigm – that economists have" (Klamer 1984, p. 183).

This particular conception of monetarism seems closely related to Brunner’s experience at UCLA: "Most distressing was moreover the encounter with a group of economists systematically applying economic analysis (i.e. price theory) to social problems of our world. The resulting confusions yielded a fertile ground for the right environment, and UCLA at the beginning of the 1950s was for me the right place. The permanent discussion with a subtle mind (Armen A. Alchian), the impact of a lucid philosopher of science (Reichenbach), and the good fortune of questioning and determined students (Allan H. Meltzer, Tibor Fabian, later on Jerry Jordan and others) dispersed the intellectual fogs and gradually structured my thinking about economics and its role in our endeavour to understand the world" (Brunner 1980, p. 403). Similarly, to the question "When did you become a monetarist?", Brunner answered: "I find it actually quite interesting in retrospect to retrace the question in my discussions with Alchian" (Klamer 1984, p. 182).

More specifically, Brunner considered that "the major propositions characterizing the monetarist view can be organized into four groups. These groups bear on descriptions of the transmission mechanism, the dynamic properties of the private sector, the dominance and nature of the monetary impulses and the separation of aggregate and allocative forces" (Brunner 1970, p. 2).

== The transmission of monetary policy ==
In the above quotation, as well as in other accounts of the main propositions characterizing monetarism, Karl Brunner systematically mentioned the transmission mechanism of monetary policy first. According to Brunner and Allan Meltzer (1976), a monetarist transmission mechanism is such that "changes in money modify relative prices and initiate a process of substitution that spreads to the markets for existing capital securities, loans and current output" (p. 97). The central role played by relative-price movements led Brunner to use the terms 'transmission process' and 'relative-price process' interchangeably. He actually perceived the transmission mechanism as "a suitable application of relative price theory" to explain output and employment fluctuations (Brunner 1968, p. 18).

More precisely, the transmission mechanism of monetary policy considered by Brunner and Meltzer relies on the relative behavior of two prices. First, the price of existing real assets, denoted by P, which is actually the price of existing real capital. Second, the price of output, denoted by p, which is the price of the item used both for building new real capital and for consumption purposes. Moreover, Brunner and Meltzer assumed that the costs of acquiring information are smaller in the assets markets than in the output market. As a result, the speed of adjustment of P in response to shocks is higher than that of p.

An increase in the growth rate of money supply thus implies a rise in the ratio of P to p. This means that the price of new capital has fallen relative to the price of existing capital, stimulating private investment (i.e. the production of new capital). Furthermore, a rise in the P to p ratio also generates a positive wealth effect and then an increase in private consumption. Hence, an expansionary monetary policy raises each component of private aggregate spending through an increase in P/p. It is worth noting that this mechanism is close to the one set out by James Tobin (the so-called Tobin’s Q) in 1969.

== The origin of money ==
In 1971, Karl Brunner and Allan Meltzer delivered an analysis of the origin of money as a medium of exchange. The essentials of the explanation presented there were first set out in a paper published in 1964 in the Journal of Finance (Brunner and Meltzer 1964, p. 257-261).

The crucial ingredient is the absence of perfect information about the quality of the goods households seek to purchase. Searching for information about the quality of goods involves some costs, whose amount differs substantially across goods. In this context, the goods with comparatively lower information costs for most households will emerge as media of exchange: "Where knowledge of market opportunities and the qualities of goods is neither costless to obtain nor uniformly distributed, the use of money as a medium of exchange reduces the resource cost of exchanging... For individuals, money is a substitute for investment in information and labor allocated to search. By using money, individuals reduce the amount of information they must acquire, process, and store, and they reduce the number of transactions in which they engage to exchange their initial endowments for optimal baskets of goods" (Brunner and Meltzer 1971, p. 799).

== Monetary policy and the defense of money growth rules ==
In the 1960s, Karl Brunner (largely agreeing with Milton Friedman) considered that the then-popular literature on optimal policy, in which "the policy maker is given complete knowledge of the structural relations pertaining to the economy and a set of goal variables that enter the social utility function" (Brunner and Meltzer 1969, p. 3), missed the essential point of the real-world policy problem. In collaboration with Allan Meltzer, Brunner proposed an analytic framework labelled "targets and indicators of monetary policy", in which monetary policy could usefully be discussed and criticized. In the words of Brunner and Meltzer (1969), "the problem of selecting an indicator of monetary policy is equivalent to the problem of finding a scale that allows us to make reliable statements comparing the thrust of various policy combinations" (p. 16).

Under conditions of complete knowledge, the indicator problem is totally trivial. In this case, indeed, the thrust of any policy combination on any variable can always be calculated with utter accuracy. Under uncertainty, however, things are different. For example, Brunner and Meltzer showed that, within their framework, the behavior of free reserves (a widely deployed guide to the stance of monetary policy in the 1960s) was not monotonically related to the tightness or looseness of policy conceived of in such terms. Therefore, to rely upon it was to run the risk of misconstruing policy's stance, perhaps rendering it pro-cyclical and destabilizing.

Karl Brunner later defended money growth rules of the type proposed by Milton Friedman. He became convinced that, though discretionary policy did sometimes deliver "phases of remarkably stability and growth... such phases depend essentially on transitory political constellations" (1984, p. 187). Thus "the nature of the monetary order and not the specific actions within a discretionary regime emerged in recent years as the central issue of a more fundamental policy problem" (p. 188). As a result, there is a clear "advantage of a monetary order based on a constant monetary growth" (p. 204).

== The criticism of Walrasian economics ==
A short time before dying, Karl Brunner defined monetarism as a 'classical' programme of a non-Walrasian tradition (Brunner 1989, p. 197). Walrasian economics would notably be unable to account for the emergence of many institutions, and especially money: "The Walrasian paradigm, based on the absence of information and transaction costs, necessarily omits all social phenomena conditioned by the operation of such costs. With full information and in the absence of any transaction costs there is no reason for the occurrence of money, on financial intermediaries and no rationale for many other social institutions... Important problems of our monetary and financial reality remain inaccessible to such a Walrasian tradition" (p. 199).

Among neo-Walrasian economists, Karl Brunner focused attention on the authors of new classical macroeconomics (NCM). A first criticism directed towards the new classical approach relates to the rational expectations hypothesis. Under this hypothesis, "people are assumed to know the policy rule used by the monetary (and fiscal) authorities and to have detailed knowledge about the structure of the economy including the size and timing of responses to shocks of various kinds. These assumptions make the models analytically tractable but, taken literally (as they often are), they distort the economist's view of the policy problem by ignoring uncertainty, incomplete knowledge about the structure of the economy and the costs of acquiring information and reducing uncertainty" (Brunner and Meltzer 1993, p. 42). A second criticism addressed by Brunner to NCM concerns the intertemporal concept of equilibrium: "I also have strong reservations about crucial aspects of their 'equilibrium approach' " (Klamer 1984, p. 191). To the question "So what is wrong with new classical economics?", Brunner answered: "Their interpretation of equilibrium analysis seems dubious to me. This specific kind of equilibrium analysis implies that all prices are market-clearing relative to all shock-realizations" (p. 192). As a result, NCM cannot explain "the lamented unresponsiveness of prices to current conditions" (Brunner 1980, p. 417), i.e. price stickiness.

== Philosophy of Science and evolutionary perspective ==
Looking back on his career, Karl Brunner considered that he had paid attention to "three distinct major groups of problems. One covers the range of monetary analysis and policy and a second involves the nature of our cognitive endeavors expressed by our pursuits. The last strand of my persistent interests developed over time from my occupation with the previous two problems. There evolved a gradual understanding that economic analysis offers a systematic approach to the whole range of sociopolitical reality" (Brunner 1984, p. 404). This section deals with the second and third groups.

In a paper entitled "Assumptions and the Cognitive Quality of Theorie", Karl Brunner argued that Milton Friedman (in his famous "Methodology of Positive Economics") had been right that "the cognitive quality of a theory cannot be judged by the realism of 'assumptions' but must be judged by the confrontation of its implications with suitable observations" (Brunner 1969, p. 503). Brunner further stressed the impossibility of ever obtaining definitive confirmation of any general theory from a finite array of empirical evidence. Rather, and like Karl Popper (1959), he pointed out the capacity of such evidence to falsify theories. At the same time, "it is, however, important to emphasise that actual refutation by a falsifying test statement is a necessary but far from sufficient reason to reject a theory. Our choice is frequently between quite imperfect theories, i.e., theories which had (sic) been ex posed to some falsifying test-statements. The comparative extent of falsification shapes the decision and not falsification as such" (p. 507).

Karl Brunner also developed an evolutionary approach of the economic agent (notably inspired by the seminal paper of Armen Alchian (1950)). In association with William Meckling, Brunner introduced the acronym REMM, for 'Resourceful, Evaluating, Maximizing Man'. According to Brunner (1987), "Resourcefulness, evaluating and maximizing behavior possess a common basis... (for which) the individual is born with a biological and genetic heritage" (p. 371). However, the term 'maximizing' should not be understood in the usual sense of the neoclassical theory. Indeed, "rationality is perhaps a more basic component of the hypothesis than maximizing behavior. Limited computational facilities of computers and human minds, the cost of gathering and interpreting information, and often a diffuse uncertainty prevent the expression of rational behavior in terms of straightforward maximization. Rational behavior produces instead a set of more or less conscious rules of procedure" (p. 374). This REMM can be contrasted with alternative "conceptions of man", namely the "political", "sociological", and "psychological" ones. Brunner and Meckling (1977) notably applied this approach to the analysis of the government: "Much of the conflict about government can... be reduced to the conflict between alternative models of man" (p. 85).

== Publications ==
- Brunner, Karl, 1974. "Monetary Management, Domestic Inflation, and Imported Inflation." In Aliber, Robert Z., ed National Monetary Policies and the International Financial System. Chicago: University of Chicago Press. 179–208
- Brunner, Karl, and Allan H. Meltzer (1971). "The Uses of Money in the Theory of an Exchange Economy." American Economic Review 61 (Dec.): 784–805.
- _____, 1993. Money and the Economy: Issues in Monetary Analysis, Cambridge. Description. and chapter previews, p p. ix–x.
- Brunner, Karl, The Selected Essays of Karl Brunner, Thomas Lys, ed., Edward Elgar.

1996. v. 1, Economic Analysis and Political Ideology. Description and chapter-preview links via scroll down.
1997. v. 2, Monetary Theory And Monetary Policy: Edward Elgar. Description.

== See also ==
- Journal of Monetary Economics
- Journal of Money, Credit and Banking
