= Nirvana =

Liberation from repeated rebirth in saṃsāra

Translations of Nirvana
- English: freedom, liberation, enlightenment
- Sanskrit: निर्वाण (IAST: nirvāṇa)
- Pali: nibbāna
- Burmese: နိဗ္ဗာန် (MLCTS: neɪʔbàɰ̃)
- Chinese: 涅槃 (Pinyin: nièpán)
- Indonesian: nirwana
- Japanese: 涅槃 (Rōmaji: nehan)
- Khmer: និព្វាន (UNGEGN: nĭpvéan)
- Korean: 열반 (RR: yeolban)
- Mon: နဳဗာန် ([nìppàn])
- Mongolian: Нирваан дүр (nirvaan dür)
- Shan: ၼိၵ်ႈပၢၼ်ႇ ([nik3paan2])
- Sinhala: නිර්වාණ (nivana)
- Tagalog: nirbana
- Tibetan: མྱ་ངན་ལས་འདས་པ། (mya ngan las 'das pa)
- Thai: นิพพาน (RTGS: nipphan)
- Vietnamese: niết bàn

Translations of Nirvana
- English: freedom, liberation, enlightenment
- Sanskrit: निर्वाण (IAST: nirvāṇa)
- Balinese: ᬡᬶᬭ᭄ᬯᬵᬦᬵ (Nirwānā)
- Bengali: নির্বাণ (nirbanô)
- Hindi: निर्वाण (nirvāṇa)
- Javanese: ꦤꦶꦂꦮꦤ (nirwana)
- Kannada: ನಿರ್ವಾಣ (nirvāṇa)
- Kashmiri: نِروان (nirvān)
- Malayalam: നിർവാണം (nirvanam)
- Marathi: निर्वाण (nirvāṇa)
- Nepali: निर्वाण (nirvāṇa)
- Odia: ନିର୍ବାଣ (nirbaana)
- Punjabi: ਨਿਰਬਾਣ / نِرْبَاݨ (nirbāṇa)
- Tamil: நிர்வாணம் (nirvanam)
- Telugu: నిర్వాణం (nirvanam)
- Urdu: نِرْوَان (nirvān)
- Gujarati: નિર્વાણ (nirvāṇa)

Nirvana, (Note: /nɪərˈvɑːnə/ neer-VAH-nə, /-ˈvænə/ -VAN-ə, /nɜːr-/ nur-; Sanskrit: निर्वाण nirvāṇa [nirʋaːɳɐ]; Pali: nibbāna; Prakrit: ṇivvāṇa; literally, "blown out", as in an oil lamp) in the Indian religions (Jainism, Hinduism, Buddhism, and Sikhism), is the concept of an individual's passions being extinguished as the ultimate state of salvation, release, or liberation from suffering (duḥkha) and from the cycle of birth and rebirth (saṃsāra).

In Indian religions, nirvana is sometimes used as a synonym of moksha and mukti. (Note: Also called vimoksha, vimukti. The Soka Gakkai Dictionary of Buddhism: "Vimoksha [解脱] (Skt; Jpn gedatsu). Emancipation, release, or liberation. The Sanskrit words vimukti, mukti, and moksha also have the same meaning. Vimoksha means release from the bonds of earthly desires, delusion, suffering and transmigration. While Buddhism sets forth various kinds and stages of enlightenment, the supreme emancipation is nirvana,) All Indian religions assert it to be a state of perfect quietude, freedom, and highest happiness; liberation from attachment and worldly suffering; and the ending of samsara, the cycle of existence. However, non-Buddhist and Buddhist traditions describe these terms for liberation differently. In Hindu philosophy, it is the union of or the realization of the identity of Atman with Brahman, depending on the Hindu tradition. In Jainism, nirvana is also the soteriological goal, representing the release of a soul from karmic bondage and samsara. The Buddhist concept of nirvana is the abandonment of the 10 fetters, marking the end of rebirth by stilling the "fires" that keep the process of rebirth going.

== Etymology ==
The ideas of spiritual liberation, with the concept of soul and Brahman, appear in Vedic texts and Upanishads, such as in verse 4.4.6 of the Brihadaranyaka Upanishad.

The term nirvana in the soteriological sense of "blown out, extinguished" state of liberation appears at many places in the Vedas and even more in the post-Buddhist Bhagavata Purana, however populist opinion does not give credit to either the Vedas or the Upanishads. Scholar Steven Collins states, "the Buddhists seem to have been the first to call it nirvana." This may have been deliberate use of words in early Buddhism, suggests Collins, since Atman and Brahman were described in Vedic texts and Upanishads with the imagery of fire, as something good, desirable and liberating. Collins says the word nirvāṇa is from the verbal root vā "blow" in the form of past participle vāna "blown", prefixed with the preverb nis meaning "out". Hence the original meaning of the word is "blown out, extinguished". (Sandhi changes the sounds: the v of vāna causes nis to become nir, and then the r of nir causes retroflexion of the following n: nis+vāna > nirvāṇa). However the Buddhist meaning of nirvana also has other interpretations.

L. S. Cousins said that in popular usage nirvana was "the goal of Buddhist discipline,... the final removal of the disturbing mental elements which obstruct a peaceful and clear state of mind, together with a state of awakening from the mental sleep which they induce."

== Overview ==
Nirvāṇa is a term found in the texts of all major Indian religions – Hinduism, Jainism, Buddhism, and Sikhism. It refers to the profound peace of mind that is acquired with moksha, liberation from samsara, or release from a state of suffering, after respective spiritual practice or sādhanā. (Note: It is sometimes referred to as bhavana, which refers to spiritual "development" or "cultivating" or "producing" in the sense of "calling into existence",)

The liberation from Saṃsāra developed as an ultimate goal and soteriological value in the Indian culture, and called by different terms such as nirvana, moksha, mukti and kaivalya. This basic scheme underlies Hinduism, Jainism and Buddhism, where "the ultimate aim is the timeless state of moksa, or, as the Buddhists first seem to have called it, nirvana." Although the term occurs in the literatures of a number of ancient Indian traditions, the concept is most commonly associated with Buddhism. Some writers believe the concept was adopted by other Indian religions after it became established in Buddhism, but with different meanings and description, for instance the use of moksha in the Hindu text Bhagavad Gita of the Mahabharata.

The idea of moksha is connected to the Vedic culture, where it conveyed a notion of amrtam, "immortality", and also a notion of a timeless, "unborn", or "the still point of the turning world of time". It was also its timeless structure, the whole underlying "the spokes of the invariable but incessant wheel of time". (Note: The wheel is a typical Vedic, or Indo-European, symbol, which is manifested in various symbols of the Vedic religion and of Buddhism and Hinduism. See, for examples, Dharmacakra, Chakra, Chakravartin, Kalachakra, Dukkha and Mandala.) The hope for life after death started with notions of going to the worlds of the Fathers or Ancestors and/or the world of the Gods or Heaven. (Note: See also Heaven (Christianity) and Walhalla)

The earliest Vedic texts incorporate the concept of life, followed by an afterlife in heaven and hell based on cumulative virtues (merit) or vices (demerit). However, the ancient Vedic Rishis challenged this idea of afterlife as simplistic, because people do not live an equally moral or immoral life. Between generally virtuous lives, some are more virtuous; while evil too has degrees, and either permanent heaven or permanent hell is disproportionate. The Vedic thinkers introduced the idea of an afterlife in heaven or hell in proportion to one's merit, and when this runs out, one returns and is reborn. The idea of rebirth following "running out of merit" appears in Buddhist texts as well. This idea appears in many ancient and medieval texts, as Saṃsāra, or the endless cycle of life, death, rebirth and redeath, such as section 6:31 of the Mahabharata and verse 9.21 of the Bhagavad Gita. (Note: Many texts discuss this theory of rebirth with the concepts of Devayana (path of gods) and Pitryana (path of fathers).) The Saṃsara, the life after death, and what impacts rebirth came to be seen as dependent on karma.

== Buddhism ==
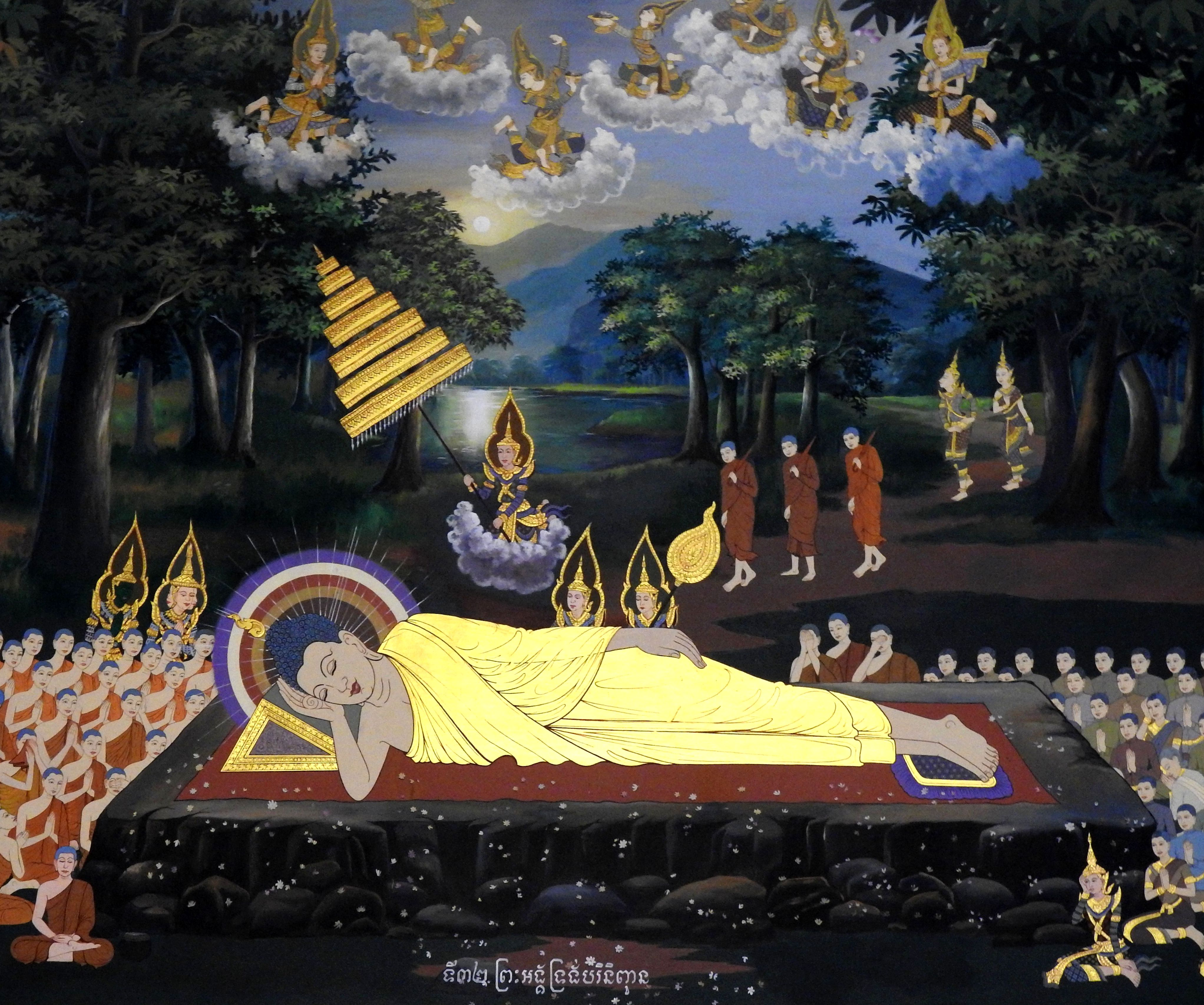
Traditional mural painting depicting Gautama Buddha entering parinirvana. Dharma assembly pavilion, Wat Botum Wattey Reacheveraram, Phnom Penh, Cambodia

Nirvana (nibbana) literally means "blowing out" or "quenching". It is the most-used as well as the earliest term to describe the soteriological goal in Buddhism: the extinguishing of the passions, which also gives release from the cycle of rebirth (saṃsāra). Nirvana is part of the Third Truth on "cessation of dukkha" in the Four Noble Truths doctrine of Buddhism. It is the goal of the Noble Eightfold Path.

The Buddha is believed in the Buddhist scholastic tradition to have realized two types of nirvana, one at awakening, and another at his death. The first is called sopadhishesa-nirvana (nirvana with a remainder), the second parinirvana or anupadhishesa-nirvana (nirvana without remainder, or final nirvana).

In the Buddhist tradition, nirvana is described as the extinguishing of the fires, which are also said to cause rebirths and associated suffering. The Buddhist texts identify these "three fires" or "three poisons" as raga (greed, sensuality), dvesha (aversion, hate) and avidyā or moha (ignorance, delusion).

The state of nirvana is also described in Buddhism as cessation of all afflictions, cessation of all actions, cessation of rebirths and suffering that are a consequence of afflictions and actions, a fire going out for lack of fuel, abandoning weaving (vana) together of life after life, and the elimination of desire.

Liberation is described as identical to anatta (anatman, non-self, lack of any self). In Buddhism, liberation is achieved when all things and beings are understood to be with no Self. Nirvana is also described as identical to achieving sunyata (emptiness), where there is no essence or fundamental nature in anything, and everything is empty. Yet, in Theravada Buddhism it is also seen as the only unconditioned existent, not just "destruction of desire" but a separate existent which is "the object of the knowledge" of the Buddhist path.

== Hinduism ==
Although the most ancient texts of Hinduism, such as the Vedas and early Upanishads, discuss a very closely related and borderline equivalent concept, with the soteriological term moksha, they do not mention the soteriological term nirvana. The earliest attestation of the term nirvana is found in texts such as the Bhagavad Gita and the Nirvana Upanishad, likely composed in the post-Buddha era. (Note: The debate around the dating of the compilation of the Bhagavad Gita is partially based on the dating of Pāṇini, whom scholars such as Bronkhorst and Witzel place in the post-Buddha era, within the 5th–4th century BCE. However, most scholars place him between the 6th and 5th century BCE, with some, such as Bod, estimating a broader range from the 7th to 5th century BCE.) However, the earliest attestation of the term nirvana in Buddhist texts is attributed to the Nikayas of the Sutta Pitaka, whose claim of First Buddhist Council origin has been questioned by several historians. Several modern scholars doubt whether the entire canon was really recited during the First Council, because the early texts contain different accounts on important subjects such as meditation. Most scholars, from the late 19th century onward, have considered even the historicity of the First Council improbable. Some scholars, such as orientalists Louis de La Vallée-Poussin and D.P. Minayeff, thought there must have been assemblies after the Buddha's death but considered only the main characters and some events before or after the First Council historical.

The concept of Nirvana is described differently in Buddhist and Hindu literature. Hinduism has the concept of Atman – the soul, self – asserted to exist in every living being, while Buddhism asserts through its anatman doctrine that there is no Atman in any being. Nirvana in Buddhism is "stilling mind, cessation of desires, and action" unto emptiness, states Jeaneane Fowler, while nirvana in post-Buddhist Hindu texts is also "stilling mind but not inaction" and "not emptiness"; rather it is infiniteness, the knowledge of true Self (Atman) and the acceptance of its universality and unity with Brahman.

=== Moksha ===
The ancient soteriological concept in Hinduism is moksha, described as the liberation from the cycle of birth and death through self-knowledge and the eternal connection of Atman (soul, self) and metaphysical Brahman. Moksha is derived from the root muc* (Sanskrit: मुच्) which means free, let go, release, liberate; Moksha means "liberation, freedom, emancipation of the soul". In the Vedas and early Upanishads, the word mucyate (Sanskrit: मुच्यते) appears, which means to be set free or release – such as of a horse from its harness.

The traditions within Hinduism state that there are multiple paths (Sanskrit: marga) to moksha: jnana-marga, the path of knowledge; bhakti-marga, the path of devotion; and karma-marga, the path of action.

=== Brahma-nirvana in the Bhagavad Gita ===
The term Brahma-nirvana appears in verses 2.72 and 5.24–26 of the Bhagavad Gita. It is the state of release or liberation; the union with the Brahman. According to Easwaran, it is an experience of blissful egolessness.

According to Zaehner, Johnson and other scholars, nirvana in the Gita is a Buddhist term adopted by the Hindus. Zaehner states it was used in Hindu texts for the first time in the Bhagavad Gita, and that the idea therein in verse 2.71–72 to "suppress one's desires and ego" is also Buddhist. According to Johnson the term nirvana is borrowed from the Buddhists to confuse the Buddhists, by linking the Buddhist nirvana state to the pre-Buddhist Vedic tradition of metaphysical absolute called Brahman.

According to Mahatma Gandhi, the Hindu and Buddhist understanding of nirvana are different because the nirvana of the Buddhists is shunyata, emptiness, but the nirvana of the Gita means peace and that is why it is described as brahma-nirvana (oneness with Brahman).

== Jainism ==
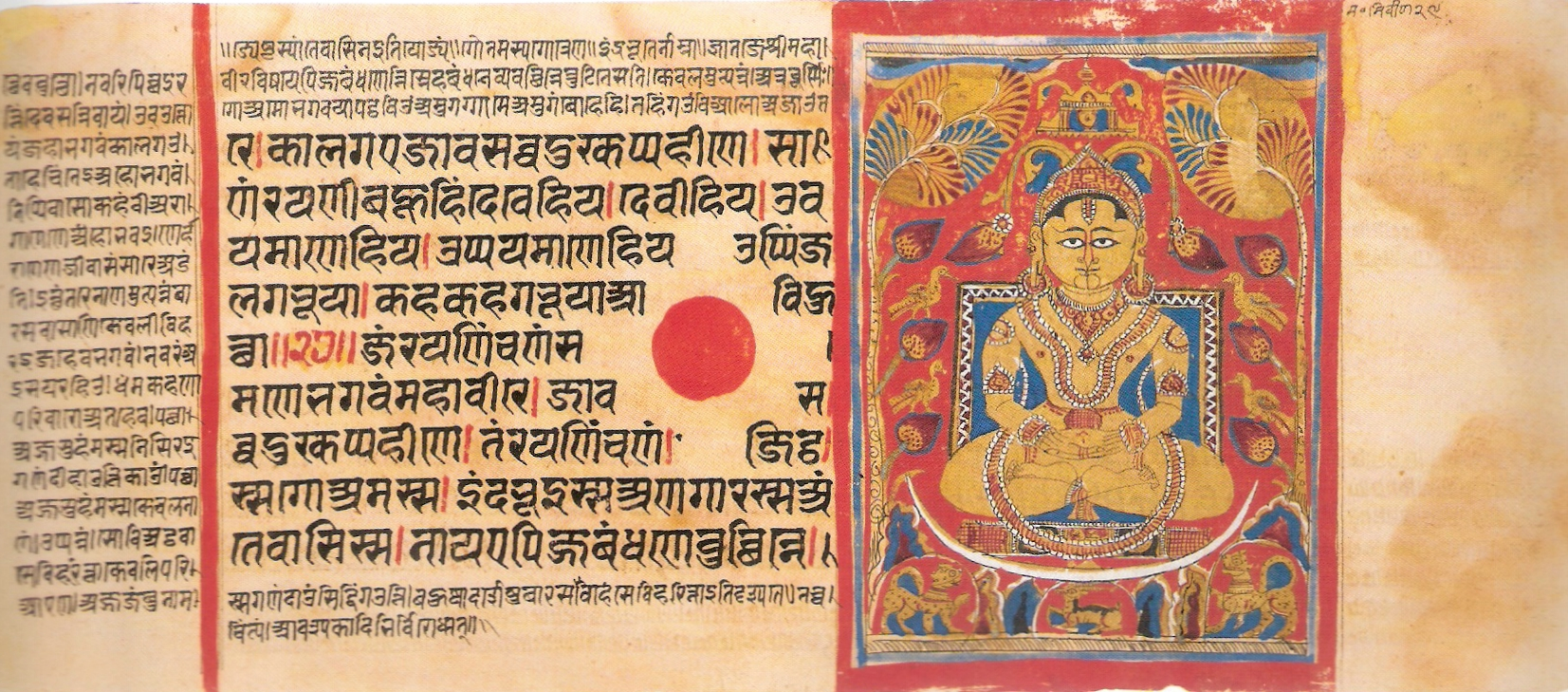
Kalpasutra folio on Mahavira Nirvana. Note the crescent shaped Siddhashila, a place where all siddhas reside after nirvana.

The terms moksa and nirvana are often used interchangeably in the Jain texts.

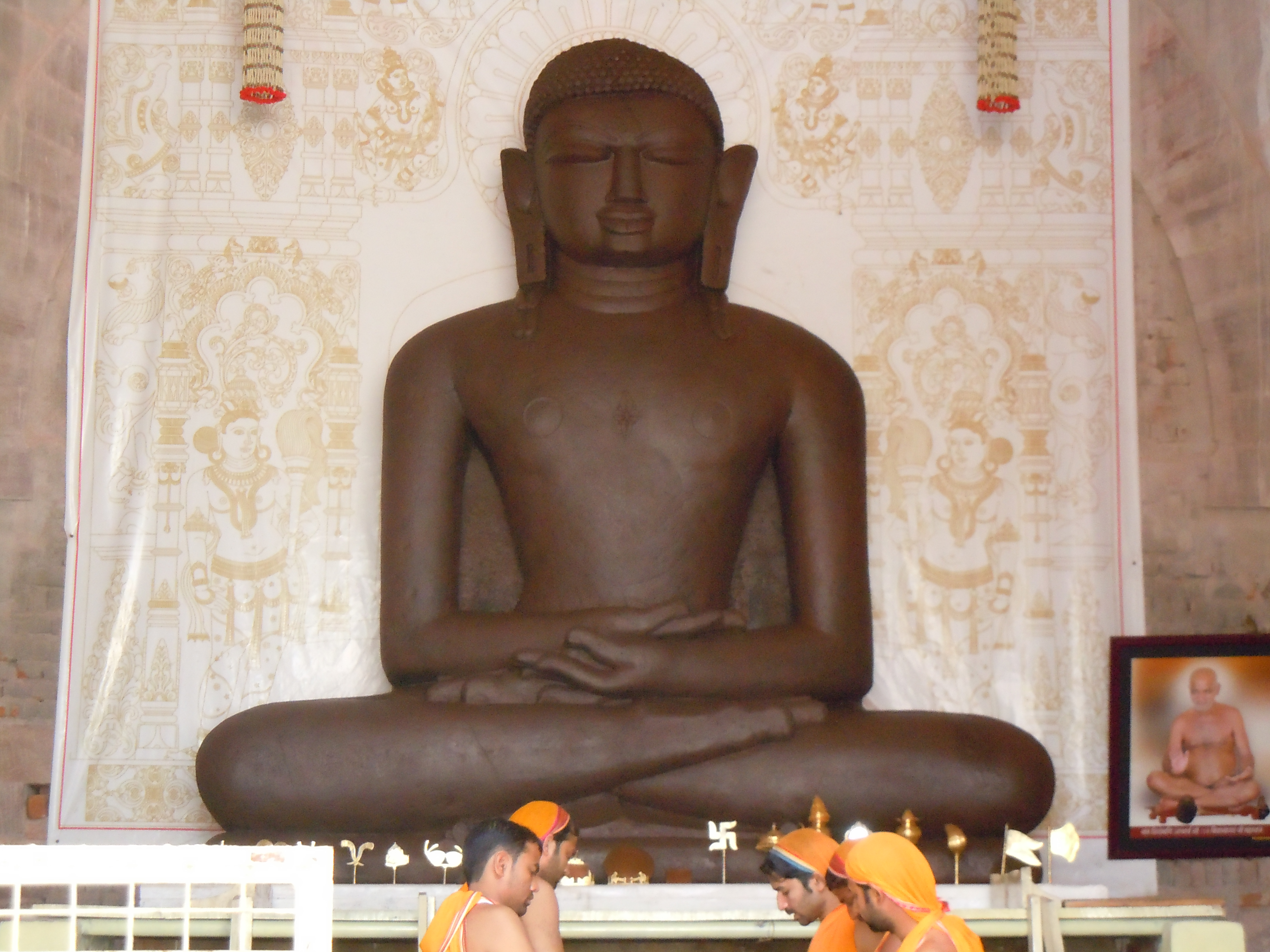
Rishabhanatha, believed to have lived millions of years ago, was the first Tirthankara to attain nirvana.

Uttaradhyana Sutra provides an account of Sudharman – also called Gautama, and one of the disciples of Mahavira – explaining the meaning of nirvana to Kesi, a disciple of Parshva. (Note: The authenticity of this text is in doubt because Parshva, in Jain tradition, lived about 250 years before Mahavira, and his disciple Kesi would have been a few hundred years old when he met the disciple of Mahavira. See Jacobi (1895), footnotes.)

There is a safe place in view of all, but difficult of approach, where there is no old age nor death, no pain nor disease. It is what is called nirvāṇa, or freedom from pain, or perfection, which is in view of all; it is the safe, happy, and quiet place which the great sages reach. That is the eternal place, in view of all, but difficult of approach. Those sages who reach it are free from sorrows, they have put an end to the stream of existence. (81–4) – Translated by Hermann Jacobi, 1895

== Sikhism ==
The concept of liberation as "extinction of suffering", along with the idea of sansara as the "cycle of rebirth" is also part of Sikhism. Nirvana appears in Sikh texts as the term Nirban. However, the more common term is Mukti or Moksh, a salvation concept wherein loving devotion to God is emphasized for liberation from endless cycle of rebirths. In Sikhism Nirvana is not an after life concept but a goal for the living. Furthermore, Sikh nirvana/mukti is achieved through devotion to satguru/truth who sets you free from reincarnation bharam/superstition/false belief.

== Manichaenism ==
The term Nirvana (also mentioned is parinirvana) is in the 13th or 14th century Manichaean work "The great song to Mani" and "The story of the Death of Mani", referring to the realm of light.

== See also ==
- Ataraxia
- Baqaa
- Bodhi
- Dzogchen
- God in Buddhism
- Jannah (Islam)
- Jnana
- Monastic silence
- Nirguna
- Nirvana fallacy
- Pure Land
- Satori
- Salvation
- Shangri-La
- Yoga
- Zen
