= Armenian Economic Association =

- Formation: 2006
- Legal status: NGO
- Headquarters: Yerevan
- Members: 500
- President: Gurgen Aslanyan
- Website: www.aea.am

The Armenian Economic Association (ArmEA or AEA) (Armenian: Հայկական տնտեսական ընկերակցություն, romanized: Haykakan tntesakan ynkerakts’ut’yun) is a professional association that promotes Armenian scholarship in economics. It was formed in 2006 and is a registered NGO in Armenia. Tatevik Sekhposyan is its current president. The association works to further economics research in Armenia, to improve economics education within Armenian institutions, to support research-based policy advising, and to develop the interest of research economists to Armenia related issues.

The association's flagship activity is the annual conference in Armenia every June. Keynote addresses in various years have been delivered by Daron Acemoglu, Tito Boeri, Ruben Enikolopov, Randall K. Filer, Sergey Guriyev, Lee Ohanian among others.

The society is led by a board of directors that is responsible for developing and executing the association's policies and activities.

== History and purpose ==
The association was formed in 2006 by David Joulfaian and Shushanik Hakobyan. It was registered as an NGO in 2012 by Zareh Asatryan, the president of the association at the time.

The aims of the Armenian Economic Association are:

1. to contribute to the development of economics education
2. to encourage the research and study of economic activity
3. to develop and promote cooperation among academic, private, and public sector researchers
4. to develop and promote cooperation with international scholars and educators, and educational and research institutions
5. to provide a platform for the free and open discussion of economic and public policy issues

== Presidents ==
2025-present: Tatevik Sekhposyan
2018-2025: Gurgen Aslanyan
2014-2018: Aleksandr Grigoryan
2012-2014: Zareh Asatryan
2006-2012: Shushanik Hakobyan

== Conferences and workshops ==
=== Annual meetings ===
Annual meetings are typically held at the end of June, except for the years 2011-2013 when they were held in October. Past meetings were hosted by:

2026 American University of Armenia in Yerevan (June 29-July 1)
2025 American University of Armenia in Yerevan (June 30-July 2)
2024 American University of Armenia in Yerevan (July 3-4) and Central Bank of Armenia Research and Training Center in Dilijan (July 5-6)
2023 Hybrid, online and in person at American University of Armenia (June 22-23), and in person only at the Armenian State University of Economics Gyumri Branch (June 24)
2022 Online (June 30), in-person American University of Armenia (July 1-2)
2021 Online
2020 Online
2019 Armenian National Agrarian University, Armenian State University of Economics, and American University of Armenia
2018 Tumo Center for Creative Technologies and American University of Armenia
2017 Yerevan State University and the American University of Armenia
2016 Yerevan State University, International Center for Agribusiness Research and Education, and American University of Armenia
2015 Yerevan State University, Central Bank of Armenia - Dilijan Center, and American University of Armenia
2014 Yerevan State University, Russian-Armenian University, and American University of Armenia
2013 Yerevan State University and American University of Armenia
2012 Yerevan State University
2011 Yerevan State University

==== Armen Alchian best paper award recipients ====
The following are the recipients of the Armen Alchian award for the best paper presented at the annual meetings:
Caio Lorecchio (2026)
Salome Baslandze (2025)
Victoria Vanasco (2024)
Davit Gomtsyan (2023)
Hayk Hambardzumyan (2022)
Corina Boar and Virgiliu Midrigan (2021)
Vladimir Asriyan (2020)
Armenak Antinyan (2019)
Nikolaos Artavanis (2018)
Tatevik Sekhposyan (2017)
Arevik Gnutzmann-Mkrtchyan (2017)
Gunes Gokmen (2016)
Mariam Arzumanyan (2016)
Suren Pakhchanyan (2016)
Ivan Djuric (2016)
Vardan Baghdasaryan (2015)
Vardan Avagyan (2015)
Artashes Karapetyan (2015)
Aleksandr Grigoryan (2014)
Nune Hovhannisyan (2014)
Gurgen Aslanyan (2014)

==== Keynote speakers ====
Keynote speakers at the annual meetings include:

Regis Barnichon (2026)
Urlich Doraszelski (2026)
Jan Eeckhout (2026)
Joe Kaboski (2026)
Gérard Roland (2025)
Steven Durlauf (2025)
Luisa Fuster (2024)
Fabio Canova (2024)
Jaume Ventura (2024)
Fernando Broner (2023)
Ana Maria Herrera (2023)
Oleg Itskhoki (2023)
Branko Milanovic (2023)
Mehdi Raissi (2023)
Paula Bustos (2022)
Armen Nurbekyan (2022)
Nico Voigtländer (2022)
Sergey Guriyev (2021)
Lee E. Ohanian 2021
Johanna Rickne 2021)
Martin Galstyan (2020)
Friedrich Heinemann (2019)
Levon Barseghyan (2019)
Francesca Molinari (2019)
Daron Acemoglu (2018)
Arye L. Hillman (2018)
Yulia Ustyugova (2018)
Xavier Raurich (2017)
Randall Filer (2017)
Laura Bailey (2016)
Ruben Enikolopov (2016)
Martin Galstyan (2015)
David Dole (2015)
Mattias Polborn (2014)
Haroutioun Samuelian (2014)
Teresa Daban Sanchez (2014)
Daron Acemoglu (2013)
Mark Davis (2013)

==== Keynote speakers at workshops ====
Conference on Econometrics and Business Analytics (2022)
Giuseppe Cavaliere
Esfandiar Maasoumi
Alexey Onatsky
Jean-Michel Zakoian

Asset Management and Pension Economics student workshop (2020)
Tito Boeri

=== Winter Workshop ===
The Winter Workshop was inaugurated in 2019. Past workshops were hosted by:

2021 Online
2020 American University of Armenia
2019 American University of Armenia

=== Women in Economics Workshop ===
The Women in Economics Workshop (WEW) was inaugurated in 2019. Past workshops were hosted by:

2022 Online
2021 Online
2019 American University of Armenia

== See also ==
- Economy of Armenia
- Education in Armenia
