= Contemporary Economic Policy =

- Discipline: Economics
- Language: English
- Edited by: Brad R. Humphreys

Publication details
- History: 1982–present
- Publisher: Wiley-Blackwell
- Frequency: Quarterly
- Impact factor: 0.482 (2013)

Standard abbreviations
- ISO 4: Contemp. Econ. Policy

Indexing
- ISSN: 1074-3529 (print); 1465-7287 (web)

Links
- Journal homepage; Online access; Online archive

Contemporary Economic Policy is a peer-reviewed academic journal published by Wiley-Blackwell on behalf of the Western Economic Association International, along with Economic Inquiry. The current editor-in-chief is Brad R. Humphreys (West Virginia University). The journal was established in 1982 as Contemporary Policy Issues.

According to the Journal Citation Reports, its 2013 impact factor is 0.482, ranking it 234 out of 332 journals in the category "Economics".
