= Uncertainty, Evolution, and Economic Theory =

1950 economics article by Armen Alchian

"Uncertainty, Evolution, and Economic Theory" is an article published in 1950 which was written by economist Armen Alchian.

In this article, Alchian delineates an evolutionary approach to describe firms' behavior. His theory embodies principles of biological evolution and natural selection. This article is among the first in the economics literature to analogize between success and survival in the market with the mechanism of variation and natural selection postulated in evolutionary biology. Alchian postulated that the survival of a few firms from a large number of firms that entered the market may be due to random entrepreneurial decisions rather than by brilliance or cunning. Success and survival rests upon the market's response to the firms' products.

Entrepreneurial decision-making cannot be tied to an explicit maximizing objective because the future is not known, and, at best, is a mishmash of probabilistic outcomes.

== Evolutionary approach to firm survival ==
The evolutionary approach to firm survival and behavior proposes that firms do not have to consciously strive to maximize profits and that is because scarcity and competition will ensure the firms' survival and will behave as if they are maximizing profits. Much like the survival of heliophiliac plants, only those plants that do get sunshine will survive. The plants that have survived is understood to have acquired more sunlight than the non-surviving plants. This explanation contrasts starkly with the mainstream picture of accurate foresight and perfect rationality often ascribed to economic actors.

Alchian dismisses profit maximization and utility maximization as meaningful attributes of firms' survival. He argues that uncertainty and probabilistic outcomes make the maximization of any objective function meaningless. Alchian states that uncertainty arises from two sources: imperfect foresight and human inability to solve complex problems with a host of variables. Uncertainty and a combination of random behavior and foresight lead to probability distributions of outcomes (profits/losses) rather than a unique outcome. Consequently any objective function has to incorporate both returns AND attitudes towards risk, but an objective function cannot incorporate a non-objective function (which is what preferences for risk are) and still be an objective function. Success and viability depend on implementing strategies that yield positive profits; similar to natural selection firms realizing negative profits are more likely to be culled from the population regardless of managerial aspirations. In the long run this leads to a population of firms appearing to share discernible criteria ascribable to successful firms. Competing firms that mimic the behavior of successful/surviving firms will appear to be consciously maximizing profits even though their strategies were developed in the absence of the aforementioned criteria. Alchian notes that the successful firms may not consciously maximize profits but act as if they do because market forces cull firms that fail to yield positive returns. What the goals of the entrepreneurs of successful firms are is not relevant. Market forces affect firm profitability, and in retrospect the historical record will show surviving firms behaving as if the firms had information and foresight. Firms which quickly emulate successful firms (by definition survivors of the market forces) will increase their chances of survival. Whereas firms that fail to adapt, or do so slowly, risk a greater likelihood of failure. Surviving firms evolve in the direction of the more economically profitable firms. Evolution and competition for scarce resources ensure that, in practice, firms do not have to consciously maximize an objective function. Alchian concludes that, despite uncertainty and the lack of knowledge by market participants, economists can still analyze the behavior of firms using the assumptions of profit maximization. The prerequisites for survival in the long run are returns greater than costs, profits in other words. In retrospect economists can compare alternatives and predict which behaviors were more conducive for survival even though such knowledge was unavailable to contemporaneous firms.

== Inspiration ==
"Uncertainty, Evolution, and Economic Theory" was heavily influenced by Armen Alchian's education and background in statistical analysis. Alchian studied statistics at Stanford University under W. Allen Wallis who introduced Alchian to the statistical work of Ronald Fisher. Fisher was one of the founders of the Neo-Darwinian Synthesis and influenced Alchian's approach on statistics. Alchian's early studies at the Rand Corporation dealt with system analysis convinced Alchian that uncertainty was a central challenge threatening assumptions of Marginal analysis.

== Impact ==
"Uncertainty, Evolution, and Economic Theory" was Alchian's first major article. It is hailed by most evolutionary economists as an important and seminal contribution to economic theory. Economists who consider the article a powerful defense of the assumption of profit maximization include Arthur S. De Vany, Harold Demsetz, and Benjamin Klein.

== Criticisms ==
"Uncertainty, Evolution, and Economic Theory" drew criticism from Sidney G. Winter; he argued that Alchian failed to consider the transmission mechanisms that determine successful behaviors, and how they can be maintained and copied over time. According to Winter if maximizing profits is not a result of conscious action, then those particular actions cannot be learned by other firms. Winter further argued that in the case of weak competition selective pressure will be limited.

== See also ==
- Evolutionary economics
