= Economics handbooks =

Economics handbooks are handbooks on subjects of economics. Such handbooks range in audience from the general reader to the advanced student and professional economist.

== Examples ==
Economics handbooks that form a series include, but are not limited to, the following:

- Cambridge Economic Handbooks – associated with Cambridge University Press in the U.K. It began in 1922 with volumes titled Supply and Demand and Money. Volumes in the series carry an often-cited introduction of J. M. Keynes, its first editor. Later works in the series include more specialized topics but written for accessibility. Various publishers have carried the series outside the U.K., including and Harcourt and University of Chicago Press in the U.S. First editions include some 25 volumes through 1993.
- Economics Handbooks from McGraw-Hill – began in 1948 with a volume titled The Location of Economic Activity. The series includes over 40 volumes through 1982.
- Handbooks in Economics from Elsevier – include the early set Handbook of Mathematical Economics, 2 v., 1981–82. Handbooks through 2011 include some 30 titles, most of them in 2 or more volumes. The general co-editors for the series in its first three decades are Kenneth J. Arrow and Michael D. Intriligator.
- Edward Elgar Publishing – lists over 200 economics handbooks published from Economics of Defence, Disarmament and Peace, its first volume in 1990, to the present.

Other economics handbooks, whether general or specialized, may come from publishers as part of a series beyond extending economics or on ad hoc basis.

A Google Scholar "economics handbook" search indexes the range of topics treated, as does a New Palgrave Dictionary of Economics Online article search by topics, using the JEL classification codes.

== Criticism ==
The textbook approach to teaching economics has been criticised by many as a problematic way of passing on knowledge because students gain the impression that textbooks present a true and uncontested version of economics. In contrast, what organizations that are active in economics education such as Rethinking Economics pledge for is to expose students to various schools of economic thought and provide them with the analytical tools to critically compare and evaluate them.

== See also ==
- Concise Encyclopedia of Economics
- International Encyclopedia of the Social & Behavioral Sciences
- The New Palgrave Dictionary of Economics
