= Journal of Monetary Economics =

Academic journal

- Discipline: Economics
- Language: English
- Edited by: Boragan Aruoba, Eric T. Swanson

Publication details
- History: 1973–present
- Publisher: Elsevier (United States)
- Frequency: 8/year
- Impact factor: 4.63 (2021)

Standard abbreviations
- ISO 4: J. Monet. Econ.

Indexing
- CODEN: JMOEDW
- ISSN: 0304-3932 (print); 1873-1295 (web)
- LCCN: 77644372
- OCLC no.: 1314426

Links
- Journal homepage; Online access

The Journal of Monetary Economics is a peer-reviewed academic journal covering research on macroeconomics and monetary economics. It is published by Elsevier and was established in October 1973 by Karl Brunner and Charles I. Plosser. Beginning in 2002, it was merged with the Carnegie-Rochester Conference Series on Public Policy. The latter series was established in 1976 and had been published independently, originally by the North-Holland Publishing Company, now an imprint of Elsevier.

According to the Journal Citation Reports, the journal has a 2021 impact factor of 4.63. Since 2022, its editors are Boragan Aruoba and Yuriy Gorodnichenko.

== See also ==
- List of economics journals
