= Arthur De Vany =

American economist, educator and author (1937–2026)

Arthur S. De Vany
- Born: August 29, 1937; Davenport, Iowa
- Died: January 13, 2026 (aged 88)

Academic background
- Education: University of California, Los Angeles

Academic work
- Discipline: Motion picture economics, Health and fitness
- Institutions: University of California, Irvine

Arthur S. De Vany (August 29, 1937 – January 13, 2026) was an American economist who studied the Hollywood film industry and developed theories of evolutionary fitness focusing on nutrition and exercise in the paleo (caveman) manner. He was professor of economics at the University of California, Irvine.

== Education ==
De Vany earned his B.A. in economics at the University of California, Los Angeles (UCLA) in 1963; his M.A. in economics from UCLA in 1965; and his Ph.D. in economics from UCLA in 1970. He also trained at the Legal Institute for Economists at Emory University in 1982.

== Motion picture economics ==
De Vany has researched motion picture economics, having created mathematical and statistical models of the dynamics of information to precisely describe the motion picture market in terms of kurtosis, skewness, wildness and uncertainty. His work has also covered other industries including water and energy.

His theses were collectively published in 2003 as Hollywood Economics: How Extreme Uncertainty Shapes the Film Industry. Using the motion picture industry's film budget and box office data provided by third-party information services such as Rentrak and Variety magazine, De Vany found that the historical relationship between a motion picture's cost and revenue converge to a group of stable distributions he describes as the Paretian distribution, i.e., the relationship between a motion picture's cost and revenue was wildly unpredictable compared to other investments.

In 1991, along with Ross Eckert, he published his Paramount Antitrust paper, an economic analysis of the landmark United States v. Paramount Pictures, Inc. decision, in which he found historical and economic reasons for the practices that were challenged by the Department of Justice, and in which most of his key ideas were expressed far before he confirmed them statistically.

In 1996, along with W. David Walls, he published the Bose-Einstein paper in the Economic Journal. Using the Bose–Einstein statistics concept used for quantum physics, he showed the complex convergence toward the Pareto distribution during the theatrical run and the way word-of-mouth drove a theatrical run's almost chaotic behavior. He was able to show that the film industry was able to adjust to such phenomena using adaptive, exhibition contracts and decentralizing decisions to be allocated to the local exhibitor through the hold-over and rental terms of the contract.

In an article co-authored with W. David Walls and published in Journal of Economic Dynamics and Control, he also coined the phrase "superstar's curse" to describe the dilemma film producers face in hiring movie stars. Producers calculate the expected increase that a star will provide to a film's profit, then pay that star the difference. However, the returns of film are heavily skewed, such that the expected return (in statistical terms, the mean) is higher than the most common return (the mode). 80% of the time, the film will return less than the expected return. Thus, 80% of the time, the film will lose money.

== Evolutionary fitness ==
De Vany worked on the concept of evolutionary fitness (similar to the Paleolithic lifestyle). He outlined his approach in The New Evolution Diet: What Our Paleolithic Ancestors Can Teach Us about Weight Loss, Fitness, and Aging (December 2010). His ideas about fitness included a diet and fitness regime that promotes a more random behavior that mimics the natural way ancestral people lived in place of the steady and regular eating and sparse exercise that are the norm in Western societies. He followed a diet that mimics the diet of ancient humans during the Paleolithic period with carefully selected modern foods such as vegetables, lean meat and seafood, fresh fruits and nuts. He also advocated glucose restriction and intermittent fasting as methods to turn down the aging pathways.

== Career ==
- Co-founder and Chief Scientist, Extremal Film Partners, Santa Monica, CA, 2007
- Member, Evolution, Complexity and Cognition Group, Free University of Brussels, 2010
- Professor of Economics and member of Institute for Mathematical Behavioral Sciences, University of California, Irvine, CA, 1984–2003
- Associate, Center for Computable Economics, UCLA, 1995–1998
- Professor, University of Houston, University Park, Houston, Texas, 1981–1984
- Professor, Simon Fraser University, Burnaby, B.C., Canada, 1980–1981
- Fellow, University of Chicago, Center for the Study of the Economy and the State, and the Law School, Chicago, Illinois, 1978–1979
- President and co-founder, Resources Research Corporation, College Station, Texas, 1977–1979
- Professor, Department of Economics, Texas A&M University, College Station, Texas, 1977–1979
- Associate Professor, Texas A&M University, Department of Economics, College Station, Texas, 1971–1977

=== Published research on motion picture economics ===
- De Vany, Arthur. "Uncertainty, waiting time and capacity utilization – a stochastic theory of product quality". Journal of Political Economy, 84: 523–541, 1976
- De Vany, Arthur. "Contracting in the movies when 'nobody knows anything'". In Victor Ginsburg, editor, Proceedings of the Rotterdam Conference on Cultural Economics, North-Holland, 2003
- DeVany, Arthur S. and Cassey Lee. "Motion pictures and the stable Paretian hypothesis". IMBS working paper, University of California, Irvine, 2000
- De Vany, Arthur S. and Cassey Lee. "Quality signals in information cascades and the dynamics of the distribution of motion picture box office revenues". Journal of Economic Dynamics and Control, 25: 593–614, 2001
- De Vany, Arthur S. and Ross Eckert. "Motion picture antitrust: the Paramount cases revisited". Research in Law and Economics, 14: 51–112, 1991
- De Vany, Arthur and Hank McMillan. "Markets, hierarchies, and antitrust in the motion picture industry". Working paper, Economics Department, University of California, Irvine, 1993
- De Vany, Arthur S. and W. David Walls. "Innovation tournaments: an analysis of rank, diffusion and survival in motion pictures". Paper presented, NBER Conference on New Products, Cambridge, MA, 1993
- De Vany, Arthur (November 13, 2003). Hollywood Economics: How Extreme Uncertainty Shapes the Film Industry. Routledge. ISBN 978-0-415-31261-5. OCLC 52388135.
  - De Vany, Arthur S. and W. David Walls. "Bose–Einstein dynamics and adaptive contracting in the motion picture industry". Economic Journal, 439(106): 1493–1514, 1996. [Reprinted in Hollywood Economics.]
  - De Vany, Arthur S. and W. David Walls. "The market for motion pictures: Rank, revenue and survival". Economic Inquiry, 4(35): 783–797, November 1997. [Reprinted in Hollywood Economics.]
  - De Vany, Arthur S. and W. David Walls. "Private information, demand cascades and the blockbuster strategy". IMBS working paper, University of California, Irvine, 2000. [Reprinted in Hollywood Economics.]
  - De Vany, Arthur and W. David Walls. "Does Hollywood make too many R-rated movies? Risk, stochastic dominance, and the illusion of expectation". Journal of Business, 75(3): 425–451, April 2002. [Reprinted in Hollywood Economics.]
  - De Vany, Arthur and W. David Walls. "Motion picture profit, the stable Paretian hypothesis, and the curse of the superstar". Journal of Economic Dynamics and Control, 2002. [Reprinted in Hollywood Economics.]
  - De Vany, Arthur and W. David Walls. "Quality evaluations and the breakdown of statistical herding in the dynamics of box office revenues". IMBS working paper, University of California, Irvine, 2002. [Reprinted in Hollywood Economics.]
  - De Vany, Arthur S. and W. David Walls. "Uncertainty in the movie industry: does star power reduce the terror of the box office?". Journal of Cultural Economics, 23(4): 285–318, November 1999. [Reprinted in Hollywood Economics.]
