= Economic Inquiry =

- Discipline: Economics
- Language: English
- Edited by: Timothy C. Salmon

Publication details
- Former name(s): Western Economic Journal
- History: 1962-present
- Publisher: Wiley-Blackwell on behalf of the Western Economic Association International
- Frequency: Quarterly
- Impact factor: 1.406 (two-year) (2018)

Standard abbreviations
- ISO 4: Econ. Inq.

Indexing
- CODEN: ECIND6
- ISSN: 0095-2583 (print); 1465-7295 (web)
- LCCN: 74645463
- OCLC no.: 48954233

Links
- Journal homepage; Online access; Online archive

Economic Inquiry is a peer-reviewed academic journal published by Wiley-Blackwell on behalf of the Western Economic Association International. The current editor-in-chief is Tim Salmon (Southern Methodist University). The journal was established in 1962 as the Western Economic Journal. It covers research on all aspects of economics. According to the SCImago Journal Rank (SJR), its two-year 2018 impact factor is 1.406, ranking it 145th out of 621 journals in the category "Economics and Econometrics".
