= William R. Allen (economist) =

American economist, professor and author (1924–2021)

William Richard Allen
- Born: April 3, 1924
- Died: January 15, 2021 (aged 96)

Academic background
- Education: Cornell College; University of Chicago; Duke University

Academic work
- School or tradition: Economics

William Richard Allen (April 3, 1924 – January 15, 2021) was an American economist, professor and author. He was known for his authorship of economic literature alongside frequent co-author Armen Alchian.

== Career ==
Allen obtained his A.B. (Bachelor of Arts) from Cornell College (1948) and his Ph.D. from Duke University (1953). He instructed at Washington University prior to joining the UCLA faculty in 1952. He was a visiting professor at Northwestern University, the University of Wisconsin, the University of Michigan, Southern Illinois University, and Texas A&M University, and he had been on the faculty of the Colorado School of Banking.

He was a consultant to the Balance of Payments Division of the Department of Commerce and a director of the Yardney Corporation. He was chairman of the department of economics from 1967–1969. A recipient of various scholarship awards as a student, his professional research (largely in international economics, monetary economics, and the history of economic theory) has been supported by grants from the Social Science Research Council, the Ford Foundation, the National Science Foundation, and the Earhart Foundation. He has received the UCLA Alumni Association Award for the Art of Teaching, the Western Economic Association's Distinguished Teaching Award, and the Foundation at Valley Forge Award for Excellence in Private Enterprise Education. He has been vice president and president of the Western Economic Association, vice president of the History of Economics Society, vice president and a member of the executive committee of the Southern Economic Association, and a director of the University Professors for Academic Order. He was the economics correspondent of the California Political Review, on the editorial board of the Social Science Quarterly, and on the advisory board of the History of Political Economy. He has participated extensively in conference, seminar, and lecture programs. He has authored, co-authored, and edited nine books and has contributed widely to professional journals in the United States and elsewhere. In 1974, he was appointed the first President of the International Institute for Economic Research; he was then Vice President of the Institute for Contemporary Studies, with which the International Institute for Economic Research merged in 1986. From 1990-1992 he was an associate of the Reason Foundation.

He was a nationally syndicated radio commentator and a newspaper columnist, a Los Angeles television commentator and an occasional magazine essayist. From 1978 to 1992 more than 200 radio stations carried daily broadcasts of “the Midnight Economist” written and delivered by Allen.

== Education ==
Bachelor of Arts in history, political science (1948), Cornell College.

Doctor of Philosophy in economics (1953), Duke University.

== Authorships and publications ==
Allen has published and edited nine books as well as publishing multiple articles in academic journals. Some of Allen's more notable works are listed below.

- Foreign Trade and Finance (co-editor: Clark Lee Allen), 1959
- Essays in Economic Thought (co-editor: Joseph J. Spengler) 1960
- International Trade Theory, 1965
- University Economics (co-author: Armen Alchian), 1st ed. 1964, 2nd ed. 1967, 3rd ed. 1972
- Midnight Economist, Volume 1, 1981
- Exchange and Production (co-author: Armen Alchian, 1st ed. 1969, 2nd ed. 1977, 3rd ed. 1983
- Milton Friedman, Bright Promises, Dismal Performance (edited, with introduction and notes), 1983
- Midnight Economist, Volume 2, 1989
- Midnight Economist, Volume 3, 1997

== Positions ==
- 1951–1952, Instructor at Washington University
- Summer 1952, Instructor at Northwestern University
- 1952–2021, Professor, Associate Professor, Assistant Professor, Lecturer, Professor Emeritus, University of California, Los Angeles
- 1963–1965, 1966–1967, Vice Chairman, Department of Economics, University of California, Los Angeles
- 1967–1969, Chairman, Department of Economics, University of California, Los Angeles
- 1964, Visiting Professor, University of Wisconsin
- 1965, Visiting Professor, University of Michigan
- 1969, Visiting Professor, Southern Illinois University
- 1969–1984, Member, Advisory Board, History of Political Economy
- 1969–1970, Vice President, Western Economic Association
- 1969–1972, Executive Committee Member, Western Economic Association
- 1970–1971, President, Western Economic Association
- 1971–1972, Chairman, Nomination Committee, Western Economic Association
- 1971–1973, Vice President, Foundation for Research in Economics and Education
- 1971–1973, Visiting Professor, Texas A&M University
- 1971–1975, Member, Executive Committee, History of Economics Society
- 1971–1980, Faculty Member, Colorado School of Banking, University of Colorado
- 1974–1975, Vice President, History of Economics Society
- 1974–1986, President, International Institute for Economic Research
- 1975–2002, Member, Editorial Board, Social Science quarterly
- 1979–1992, Nationally syndicated radio commentator, Midnight Economist
- 1985, Director, Yardney Corporation
- 1986–1990, Vice President, Institute for Contemporary Studies
- 1990–1992, Associate, Reason Foundation
- 1992–2002, Economics Correspondent, California Political Review

Other essays of William R. Allen

- "Economics, Economists, and Economic Policy: Modern American Experiences," History of Political Economy, 9 Spring 1977, 48–88.
- "The Position of Mercantilism and the Early Development of International Trade Theory" in Robert V. Eagly, ed., Events, Ideology and Economic Theory (Detroit: Wayne State University Press, 1968), 65–81, 84–106.
- "Modern Defenders of Mercantilist Theory," History of Political Economy, 2 (Fall 1970), 381–397.
- "Specie-Flow Mechanism," in The New Palgrave: A Dictionary of Economics, ed. by John Eatwell, Murray Milgate, and Peter Newman (London: Macmillan Press, Ltd., 1987), vol 4, 431–32.
- "Irving Fisher, F.D.R., and the Great Depression," History of Political Economy, 9 (Winter 1977), 560–587.
- "Irving Fisher and the 100 Percent Reserve Proposal," Journal of Law and Economics, XXXVI (October 1993), 703–717.
- "Effects on Trade of Shifting Reciprocal Demand Schedules," American Economic Review, XLII (March 1952), 135–140.
- "The International Monetary Fund and Balance of Payments Adjustment," Oxford Economic Papers, 13 (June 1961), 149–165.
- "Domestic Investment, the Foreign Trade Balance, and the World Bank," Kyklos, XV (1962), 353–373.
- "A note on the Condition for a Trade-Creating Customs Union," Western Economic Journal, V (December 1966), 64–67.
