= Douglas W. Allen =

Canadian economist

- Born: August 15, 1960 (age 66)

Academic background
- Education: University of Washington (Ph.D. in economics, 1988), Simon Fraser University (M.A. in economics, 1984 and B.A. in economics and business administration, 1983)

Academic work
- Discipline: Institutional economics, law and economics
- Institutions: Simon Fraser University
- Awards: 2014 Douglass C. North Research Award from the International Society of New Institutional Economics Excellence in Teaching Award, SFU 2009; Cormack Teaching Award 2018 Dean's Silver Medal, SFU 2000
- Website: www.sfu.ca/~allen/; Information at IDEAS / RePEc

Douglas Ward Allen (born August 15, 1960) is a Canadian economist and the Burnaby Mountain Professor of Economics at Simon Fraser University. He is known for his research on transaction costs and property rights, and how these influence the structure of organizations and institutions. His research covers four broad areas: transaction cost theory, economic history, agricultural organizations, and the family.

Allen's most cited academic work is "What Are Transaction Costs?" Here Allen notes that economists traditionally had thought of transaction costs as mere frictions to market transactions. The problem with this conception is that these types of costs are purely neoclassical, and fail to violate the Coase Theorem. Allen brought together ideas in the property rights literature with those of transaction costs, to define transaction costs as those costs incurred from establishing and maintaining economic property rights. When these costs are zero, the Coase Theorem holds, when they are positive, the Coase Theorem fails. These ideas are elaborated on in the third edition of "Economic Analysis of Property Rights" (2023) (with Yoram Barzel).

Allen wrote extensively about venal and patronage institutions in pre-modern England, and this work culminated in the book "The Institutional Revolution: Measurement and the Economic emergence of the Modern World," which won the Douglass North book prize in 2014. Allen also did extensive work (along with Bryan Leonard) on homesteading in North America. This work led to the book "Why the Rush: An Institutional Economic Analysis of Homesteading and the Settlement of the West."

Allen wrote several papers on issues related to same-sex marriage between 2006-2017. In 2013 his work on the effects of same-sex parenting on children's educational outcomes received public attention. Using Canadian census data, he found that children of same-sex parents were less likely to graduate from high school compared to children from opposite-sex married families. His study also found that child educational success in same-sex households depended on the gender composition of the household, a finding similar to an earlier article by Allen, Pakaluk, and Price, which used the US census. However, Gates asserted these estimated differences disappeared when accounting for family stability.

In 2014, he testified as an expert witness in defense of Michigan's marriage laws. At the end of his four-hour testimony, plaintiff attorney Ken Mogill asked him: "Professor Allen, yes or no, are gays going to hell?" Allen replied: "Unless they repent, yes." Many in the press took this to mean that he believed that people who engage in homosexual acts will go to hell. Allen has stated he was only referring to Luke 13:3 where Jesus stated all will perish (regardless of sexuality) unless they repent, and that he would have given the same answer if the question had been "are economists going to hell?". The state of Michigan defended Allen's remarks, arguing that they did not taint the expert statistical conclusions he expressed in his testimony. The judge in that case, Bernard A. Friedman, subsequently overturned the ban and concluded that Allen's research, along with the research of Professors Loren Marks and Joe Price, on same-sex marriage represented a "fringe viewpoint" and accepted the use of snowball sampling as a legitimate statistical strategy.

== Publications ==
- The Nature of the Farm (MIT Press, 2002)
- The Institutional Revolution: Measurement and the Economic Emergence of the Modern World (University of Chicago Press, 2012)
