= Barbara Koremenos =

Barbara Koremenos is an American Professor of Political Science at the University of Michigan. She is known for her research in the field of international relations, in particular on international organizations and international agreements. Her work on the application of rational choice institutionalism to the design of international organizations is among the most assigned work in international relations graduate training in United States universities.

She has a PhD in Political Science from the University of Chicago.
