= Harold Demsetz =

American economist (1930–2019)

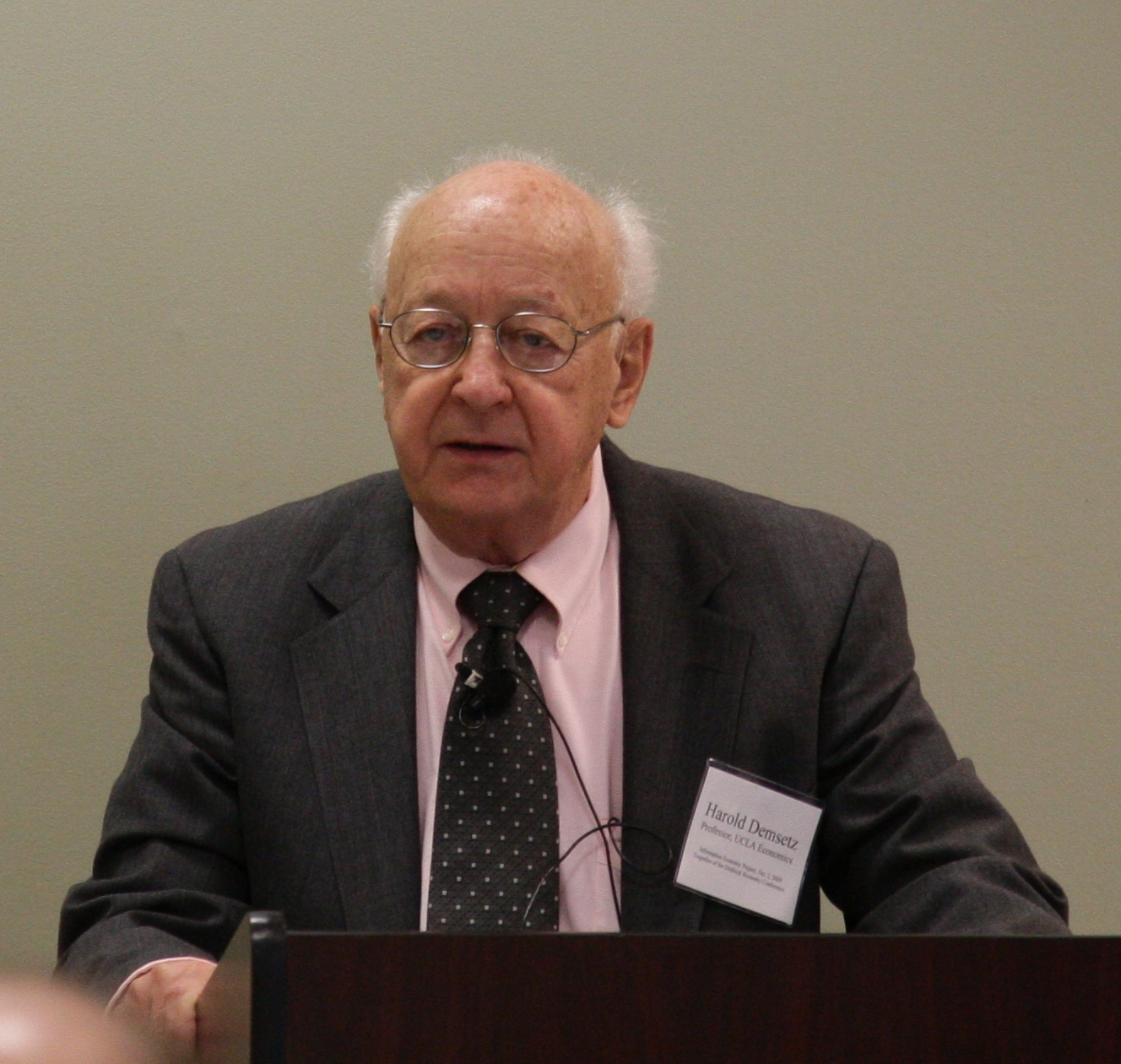
- Born: May 31, 1930; Chicago, Illinois
- Died: January 4, 2019 (aged 88)

Academic background
- Education: Northwestern University; University of Illinois

Academic work
- Discipline: Managerial economics
- School or tradition: New institutional economics
- Institutions: UCLA; University of Chicago
- Notable ideas: Nirvana fallacy
- Website: Information at IDEAS / RePEc

Harold Demsetz (/ˈdɛmsɛts/; May 31, 1930 – January 4, 2019) was an American professor of economics at the University of California at Los Angeles (UCLA).

== Career ==
Demsetz grew up on the West Side of Chicago, the grandchild of Jewish immigrants from central and eastern Europe. He studied engineering, forestry, and philosophy at four universities before being awarded a B.A. (1953) in economics from the University of Illinois, and an MBA (1954) and a Ph.D. (1959) from Northwestern University. While a graduate student, he published an article each in Econometrica and the Journal of Political Economy.

Demsetz taught at the University of Michigan (1958–60), UCLA, 1960–63, and the Graduate School of Business at the University of Chicago, 1963–71. In 1971, he returned permanently to UCLA's Economics Department, which he chaired 1978–80. He held the Arthur Andersen UCLA Alumni Chair in Business Economics, 1986–95. He has been affiliated with the Center for Naval Analyses and the Hoover Institution.

Demsetz was a fellow of the American Academy of Arts and Sciences, a director of the Mont Pelerin Society, and a past (1996) president of the Western Economics Association.

== Work ==
Demsetz belonged to the Chicago school of economic theory, and was one of the pioneers of the approach now called New Institutional Economics. He is a founder of the field of managerial economics. He has expanded the theory of property rights now prevalent in law and economics. Even though Demsetz never employed game theory, he is a major figure in industrial organization through his writings on the theory of the firm, antitrust policy, and business regulation. His expository style is devoid of mathematical formalism to an extent unusual for someone who began his career after 1950. His principal influences include Frank Knight and a number of colleagues: Armen Alchian, Ronald Coase, Aaron Director, and George Stigler.

Demsetz coined the term "nirvana fallacy" in 1969.

The 1972 Demsetz and Armen Alchian article Production, Information Costs and Economic Organization was selected as one of the twenty most important articles published in the first century of the American Economic Review.

One of his most significant works over the course of many decades was on externalities, in which he disputed the conclusions of Pigou and of Coase and showed that there is no problem of externalities which invokes a role for the government. Instead, with strategic behaviour we might get a problem of public goods with a potential role for the government. His 2011 paper, "The Problem of Social Cost: What Problem? A Critique of the Reasoning of A.C. Pigou and R.H. Coase" provides a detailed analysis of this position.

== Major publications ==
- 1967, "Toward a Theory of Property Rights," American Economic Review.
- 1968, "Why Regulate Utilities?" Journal of Law and Economics.
- 1969, "Information and Efficiency: Another Viewpoint," Journal of Law and Economics.
- 1972, (with Armen Alchian), "Production, Information Costs and Economic Organization", American Economic Review.
- 1973, "Industry Structure, Market Rivalry and Public Policy," Journal of Law and Economics.
- 1974, "Two systems of belief about monopoly," in H. Goldschmid, et al., eds., Industrial Concentration: The New Learning, Boston: Little Brown, also chapter 7 in, Demsetz, Harold. Efficiency, Competition, and Policy. Cambridge MA: Basil Blackwell, 1989.)
- 1979, "Accounting for Advertising as a Barrier to Entry," Journal of Business.
- 1982, Economic, Legal, and Political Dimensions of Competition.
- 1988, The Organization of Economic Activity, 2 vols. Blackwell. Reprints most of Demsetz's better known journal articles published as of date.
- 1994, (with Alexis Jacquemin). Anti-trust Economics: New Challenges for Competition Policy.
- 1995, The Economics of the Business Firm: Seven Critical Commentaries.
- 1997, "The Primacy of Economics: An Explanation of the Comparative Success of Economics in the Social Sciences" (Presidential Address to the Western Economics Association), Economic Inquiry.
- 2008, "From Economic Man to Economic System: Essays on Human Behavior and the Institutions of Capitalism"
- 2011, "The Problem of Social Cost: What Problem? - A Critique of the Reasoning of A.C. Pigou and R.H. Coase" in Review of Law and Economics.
