= Yoram Barzel =

Israeli economist (1931–2022)

- יורם ברזל
- Born: December 9, 1931; Jerusalem, Mandatory Palestine
- Died: December 22, 2022 (aged 91); Seattle, Washington, U.S.

Academic background
- Education: University of Chicago
- Doctoral advisor: Arnold Harberger; Zvi Griliches

Yoram Barzel (Hebrew: יורם ברזל; December 9, 1931 – December 22, 2022) was an American-Israeli economist and a professor in the Department of Economics at the University of Washington. He was interested in property rights, applied price theory, and political economy.

== Education ==
Barzel graduated with a B.A. (1953) and M.A. (1956) in economics from Hebrew University of Jerusalem. He completed his Ph.D. in economics from the University of Chicago in 1961. He specialized in price theory and economic organization.

== Research ==
Barzel is known for developing a property rights/transaction cost approach to economics and he has written on topics ranging from car racing to slavery, to Jewish lending to voting rules in condominium associations. Among his many ideas are those about racing to claim assets, multitasking, rationing by waiting, divided ownership of complex assets, measurement costs, and the economic origins of democracy. In the process Barzel's work unearthed the economic rationale for many institutions and offered a framework for analyzing them. Barzel holds an important place among all economists for expanding the scope of economic science in a way that focuses attention on the importance of institutions and the economic logic of their variety. He took a lot from discussions with his fellow mate at Seattle, Steven N. S. Cheung, but both were not sharing the same opinion about the/their master, Ronald H. Coase.

== Death ==
Barzel died in Seattle, Washington on December 22, 2022, at the age of 91.

== Book ==
Following are the books published by Barzel.

- The Political Economy of the Oil Import Quota, (with Christopher D. Hall), (Prefaced by George Stigler), Hoovers Institution Press, Stanford University, 1977
- Economic Analysis of Property Rights, Cambridge University Press, 1989.
- Productivity Change, Public Goods and Transaction Costs: Essays at the Boundaries of Microeconomics, (Economists of the Twentieth Century), Edward Elgar, 1995.
- A Theory of the State: Economic Rights, Legal Rights, and the Scope of the State, Cambridge University Press, 2002.

== Sources ==
- Yoram Barzel at the University of Washington.
- Yoram Barzel publications indexed by Google Scholar
