= Chicago school of economics =

School of economic thought

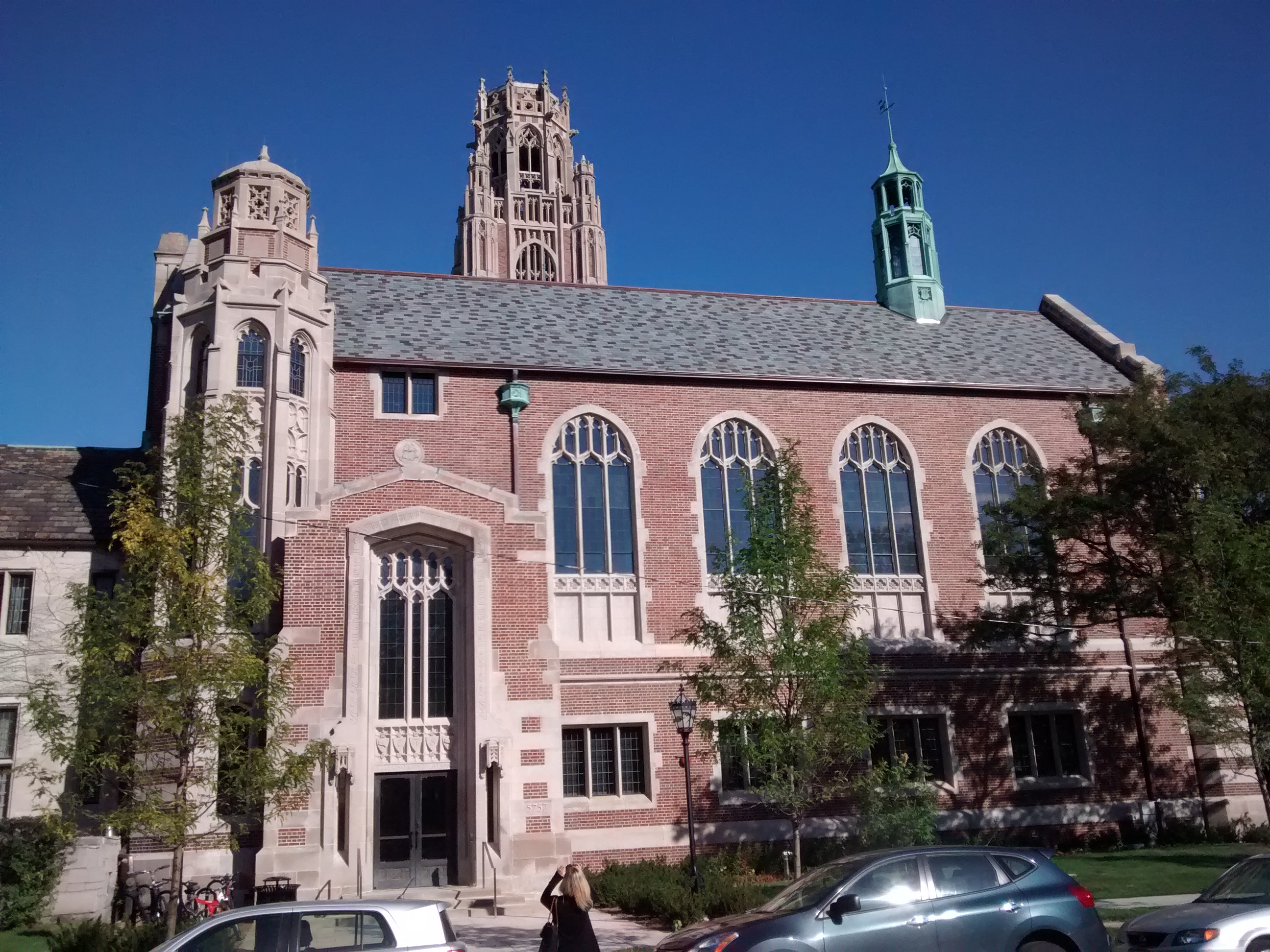
Department of Economics at the University of Chicago

The Chicago school of economics is a neoclassical school of economic thought associated with the work of the faculty at the University of Chicago, some of whom have constructed and popularized its principles. Milton Friedman and George Stigler are considered the leading scholars of the Chicago school.

Chicago macroeconomic theory rejected Keynesianism in favor of monetarism until the mid-1970s, when it turned to new classical macroeconomics heavily based on the concept of rational expectations. The freshwater–saltwater distinction is largely antiquated today, as the two traditions have heavily incorporated ideas from each other. Specifically, new Keynesian economics was developed as a response to new classical economics, electing to incorporate the insight of rational expectations without giving up the traditional Keynesian focus on imperfect competition and sticky wages.

Chicago economists have also left their intellectual influence in other fields, notably in pioneering public choice theory and law and economics, which have led to revolutionary changes in the study of political science and law. Other economists affiliated with Chicago have made their impact in fields as diverse as social economics and economic history.

As of 2025, the University of Chicago Economics department, considered one of the world's foremost economics departments, has been awarded 15 Nobel Memorial Prizes in Economic Sciences—more than any other university—and has been awarded six John Bates Clark Medals. Not all members of the department belong to the Chicago school of economics, which is a school of thought rather than an organization.

== History and terminology ==
The term was coined in the 1950s to refer to economists teaching in the Economics Department at the University of Chicago, and closely related academic areas at the university such as the Booth School of Business, Harris School of Public Policy and the Law School. In the context of macroeconomics, it is connected to the freshwater school of macroeconomics, in contrast to the saltwater school based in coastal universities (notably Harvard, Yale, Penn, UC Berkeley, and UCLA).

The Chicago economists met together in frequent intense discussions that helped set a group outlook on economic issues, based on price theory. The 1950s saw the height of popularity of the Keynesian school of economics, so the members of the University of Chicago were considered heterodox. Besides what is popularly known as the "Chicago school", there is also an "Old Chicago" or the first-generation Chicago school of economics, consisting of an earlier generation of economists (approximately the 1920's to 1940's) such as Frank Knight, Henry Simons, Lloyd Mints, Jacob Viner, Aaron Director and others. This group had diverse interests and approaches, but Knight, Simons, and Director in particular advocated a focus on the role of incentives and the complexity of economic events rather than on general equilibrium. Outside of Chicago, these early leaders were important influences on the Virginia school of political economy. Nonetheless, these scholars had an important influence on the thought of Milton Friedman and George Stigler who were the leaders of the second-generation Chicago school, most notably in the development of price theory and transaction cost economics. The third generation of Chicago economics is led by Gary Becker, as well as macroeconomists Robert Lucas Jr. and Eugene Fama.

A further significant branching of Chicago thought was dubbed by George Stigler as "Chicago political economy". Inspired by the Coasian view that institutions evolve to maximize the Pareto efficiency, Chicago political economy came to the surprising and controversial view that politics tends towards efficiency and that policy advice is irrelevant.

== Awards and honors ==
=== Nobel Memorial Prizes ===
As of 2022, the University of Chicago Economics Department has been awarded 15 Nobel Memorial Prize in Economic Sciences (laureates were affiliated with the department when receiving the prizes) since the prize was first awarded in 1969. In addition, as of October 2018, 32 out of the total 81 Nobel laureates in Economics have been affiliated with the university as alumni, faculty members or researchers, which has been a source of controversy. However, not all members of the department belong to the Chicago school of economics.

Nobel Prizes awarded to the UChicago's Department of Economics
Year	Laureate	Prize share	Prize motivation	Reference
2024	James A. Robinson	1/3	"for studies of how institutions are formed and affect prosperity."	
2022	Douglas Diamond	1/3	"for research on banks and financial crises."	
2017	Richard Thaler	1/1	"for his contributions to behavioural economics."	
2013	Eugene Fama	1/3	"for their empirical analysis of asset prices."	
2013	Lars P. Hansen	1/3	"for their empirical analysis of asset prices."	
2007	Roger Myerson	1/3	"for having laid the foundations of mechanism design theory."	
2000	James Heckman	1/2	"for his development of theory and methods for analyzing selective samples."	
1995	Robert Lucas Jr.	1/1	"for having developed and applied the hypothesis of rational expectations, and thereby having transformed macroeconomic analysis and deepened our understanding of economic policy."	
1993	Robert Fogel	1/2	"for having renewed research in economic history by applying economic theory and quantitative methods in order to explain economic and institutional change."	
1992	Gary Becker	1/1	"for having extended the domain of microeconomic analysis to a wide range of human behaviour and interaction, including nonmarket behaviour."	
1991	Ronald Coase	1/1	"for his discovery and clarification of the significance of transaction costs and property rights for the institutional structure and functioning of the economy."	
1990	Merton Miller	1/3	"for their pioneering work in the theory of financial economics."	
1982	George Stigler	1/1	"for his seminal studies of industrial structures, functioning of markets and causes and effects of public regulation."	
1979	Theodore Schultz	1/2	"for their pioneering research into economic development research with particular consideration of the problems of developing countries."	
1976	Milton Friedman	1/1	"for his achievements in the fields of consumption analysis, monetary history and theory and for his demonstration of the complexity of stabilization policy."	

=== John Bates Clark Medals ===
As of 2019, the University of Chicago Economics Department has been awarded six John Bates Clark Medals (medalists were affiliated with the department when receiving the medals) since the medal was first awarded in 1947. However, some medalists may not belong to the Chicago school of economics.

Year	Medalist	Reference
2014	Matthew Gentzkow	
2003	Steven Levitt	
1997	Kevin M. Murphy	
1983	James Heckman	
1967	Gary Becker	
1951	Milton Friedman	

== Notable scholars ==
=== Early members ===
==== Frank Knight ====
Frank Knight (1885–1972) was an early member of the University of Chicago department. He joined the department in 1929, coming from the University of Iowa. His most influential work was Risk, Uncertainty and Profit (1921) from which the term Knightian uncertainty was derived. Knight's perspective was iconoclastic, and markedly different from later Chicago school thinkers. He believed that while the free market could be inefficient, government programs were even less efficient. He drew from other economic schools of thought such as institutional economics to form his own nuanced perspective.

==== Henry Simons ====
Henry Calvert Simons (1899–1946) did his graduate work at the University of Chicago but did not submit his final dissertation to receive a degree. In fact, he was initially influenced by Frank Knight while he was an assistant professor at the University of Iowa from 1925 to 1927, and in summer 1927 Simons decided to join the Department of Economics at the University of Chicago (earlier than Knight did). He was a long-term member in the Chicago economics department, most notable for his antitrust and monetarist models.

==== Jacob Viner ====
Jacob Viner (1892–1970) was in the faculty of Chicago's economics department for 30 years (1916–1946). He inspired a generation of economists at Chicago, including Milton Friedman.

==== Aaron Director ====
Aaron Director (1901–2004) had been a professor at Chicago's Law School since 1946. He is regarded as a founder of the field Law and economics and established The Journal of Law & Economics in 1958. Director influenced some of the next generation of jurists, including Richard Posner, Antonin Scalia and Chief Justice William Rehnquist.

==== Theodore Schultz ====
A group of agricultural economists led by Theodore Schultz (1902–1998) and D. Gale Johnson (1916–2003) moved from Iowa State to the University of Chicago in the mid-1940s. Schultz served as the chair of economics from 1946 to 1961. He became president of the American Economic Association in 1960, retired in 1967, though he remained active at the University of Chicago until his death in 1998. Johnson served as department chair from 1971 to 1975 and 1980–1984 and was president of the American Economics Association in 1999. Their research in farm and agricultural economics was widely influential and attracted funding from the Rockefeller Foundation to the agricultural economics program at the university. Among the graduate students and faculty affiliated with the pair in the 1940s and 1950s were Clifford Hardin, Zvi Griliches, Marc Nerlove, and George S. Tolley. In 1979, Schultz was awarded the Nobel Prize in Economics for his work in human capital theory and economic development.

=== Second generation ===
==== Milton Friedman ====
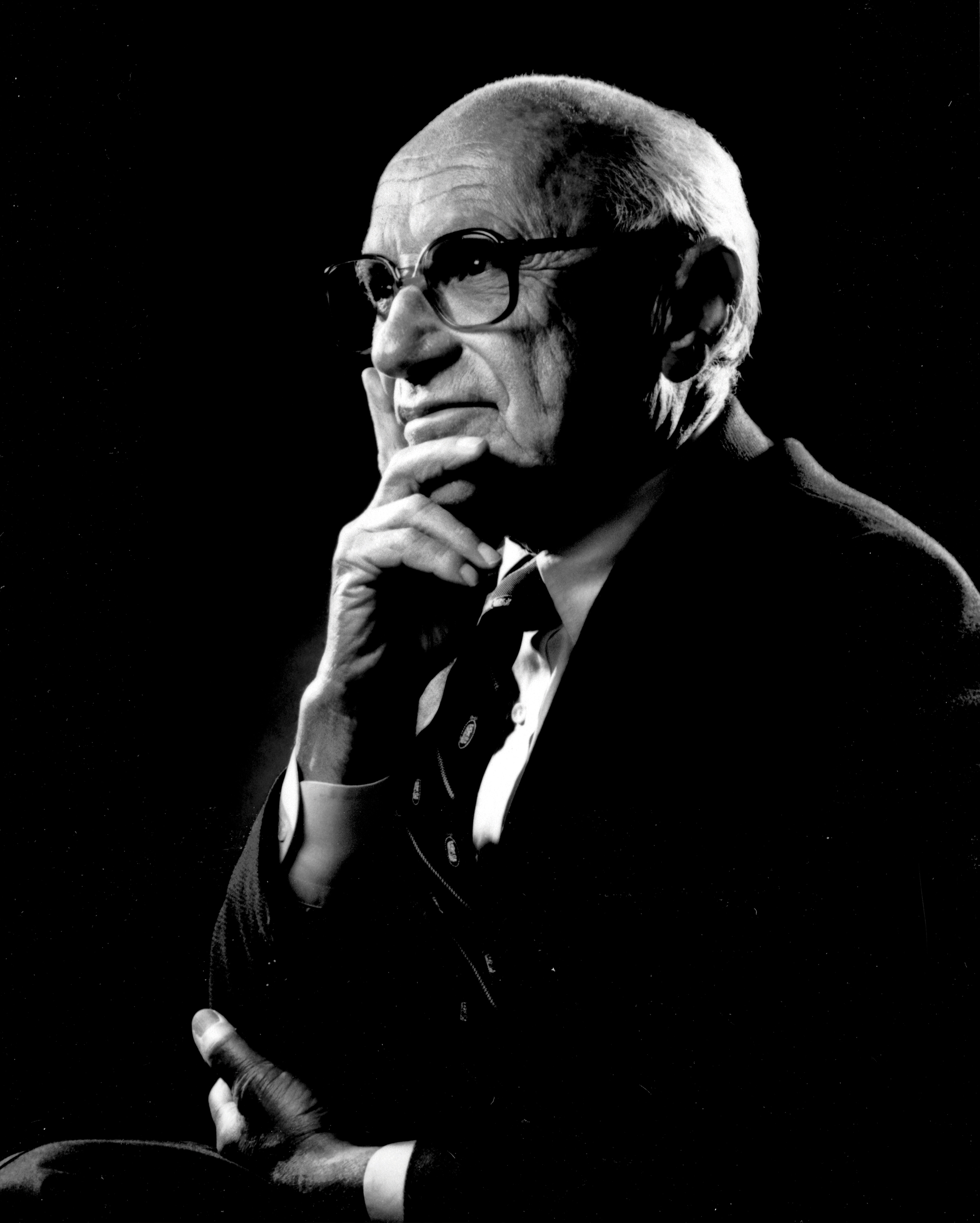
The Nobel laureate Milton Friedman was affiliated with the University of Chicago for three decades; his ideas and his students made significant contributions to the development of Chicago School theory.

Milton Friedman (1912–2006) stands as one of the most influential economists of the late twentieth century. A student of Frank Knight, he was awarded the Nobel Prize in Economics in 1976 for, among other things, A Monetary History of the United States (1963). Friedman argued that the Great Depression had been caused by the Federal Reserve's policies through the 1920s and worsened in the 1930s. Friedman argued that laissez-faire government policy is more desirable than government intervention in the economy:

One of the great mistakes is to judge policies and programs by their intentions rather than their results.

— Milton Friedman Interview with Richard Heffner on The Open Mind (7 December 1975)

Governments should aim for a neutral monetary policy oriented toward long-run economic growth, by gradual expansion of the money supply. He advocated the quantity theory of money, that general prices are determined by money. Therefore, active monetary (e.g. easy credit) or fiscal (e.g. tax and spend) policy can have unintended negative effects. In Capitalism and Freedom (1962) Friedman wrote:

There is likely to be a lag between the need for action and government recognition of the need; a further lag between recognition of the need for action and the taking of action; and a still further lag between the action and its effects.

The slogan that "money matters" has come to be associated with Friedman, but Friedman had also leveled harsh criticism of his ideological opponents. Referring to Thorstein Veblen's assertion that economics unrealistically models people as "lightning calculator[s] of pleasure and pain", Friedman wrote:

Criticism of this type is largely beside the point unless supplemented by evidence that a hypothesis differing in one or another of these respects from the theory being criticized yields better predictions for as wide a range of phenomena.

==== George Stigler ====
George Stigler (1911–1991) was tutored for his thesis by Frank Knight and was awarded the Nobel Prize in Economics in 1982. He is best known for developing the Economic Theory of Regulation, also known as regulatory capture, which says that interest groups and other political participants will use the regulatory and coercive powers of government to shape laws and regulations in a way that is beneficial to them. This theory is an important component of the Public Choice field of economics. He also carried out extensive research into the history of economic thought. His 1962 article "Information in the Labor Market" developed the theory of search unemployment.

==== Ronald Coase ====
Ronald Coase (1910–2013) was the most prominent economic analyst of law and the 1991 Nobel Prize-winner. His first major article, "The Nature of the Firm" (1937), argued that the reason for the existence of firms (companies, partnerships, etc.) is the existence of transaction costs. Rational individuals trade through bilateral contracts on open markets until the costs of transactions mean that using corporations to produce things is more cost-effective.

His second major article, "The Problem of Social Cost" (1960), argued that if we lived in a world without transaction costs, people would bargain with one another to create the same allocation of resources, regardless of the way a court might rule in property disputes. Coase used the example of an 1879 London legal case about nuisance named Sturges v Bridgman, in which a noisy sweetmaker and a quiet doctor were neighbours; the doctor went to court seeking an injunction against the noise produced by the sweetmaker. Coase said that regardless of whether the judge ruled that the sweetmaker had to stop using his machinery, or that the doctor had to put up with it, they could strike a mutually beneficial bargain that reaches the same outcome of resource distribution. Only the existence of transaction costs may prevent this.

So, the law ought to pre-empt what would happen, and be guided by the most efficient solution. The idea is that law and regulation are not as important or effective at helping people as lawyers and government planners believe. Coase and others like him wanted a change of approach, to put the burden of proof for positive effects on a government that was intervening in the market, by analysing the costs of action.

=== Third generation ===
==== Gary Becker ====
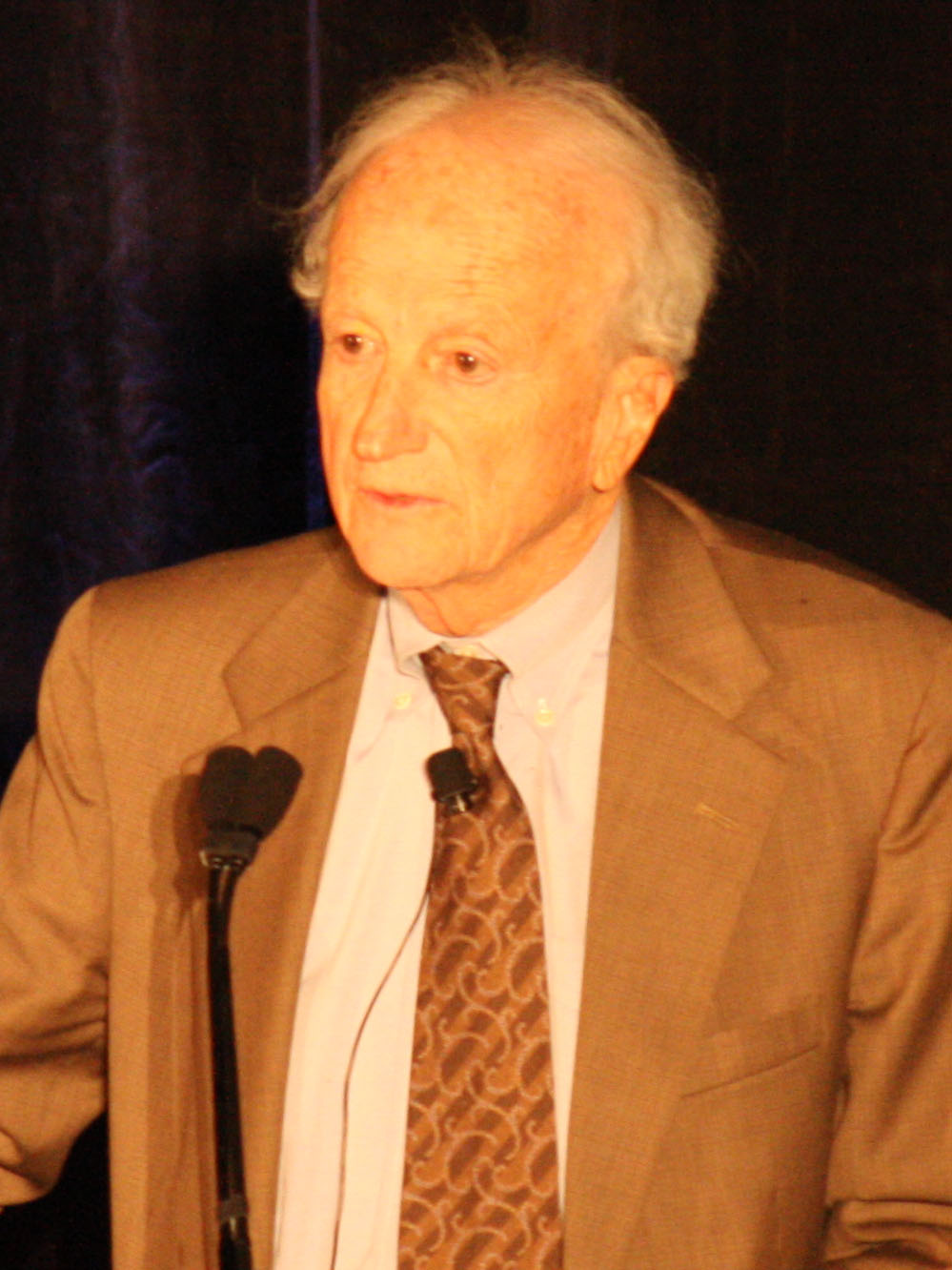
Gary Becker (May 24, 2008)

Gary Becker (1930–2014) received the Nobel Prize in Economics 1992 and the Presidential Medal of Freedom in 2007. Becker received his PhD at the University of Chicago in 1955 under H. Gregg Lewis, and was influenced by Milton Friedman. In 1970, he returned to Chicago as a professor and stayed affiliated with the university until his death. He is considered one of the founding fathers of Chicago political economy, and one of the most influential economists and social scientists in the second half of the twentieth century.

Becker was known in his work for applying economic methods of thinking to other fields, such as crime, sexual relationships, slavery and drugs, assuming that people act rationally. His work was originally focused in labor economics. His work partly inspired the popular economics book Freakonomics. In June 2011, the Becker Friedman Institute for Research in Economics was established at the University of Chicago in honor of Gary Becker and Milton Friedman.

==== Robert E. Lucas ====
Robert Lucas (born 1937), who won the Nobel Prize in 1995, has dedicated his life to unwinding Keynesianism. His major contribution is the argument that macroeconomics should not be seen as a separate mode of thought from microeconomics, and that analysis in both should be built on the same foundations. Lucas's works cover several topics in macroeconomics, included economic growth, asset pricing, and monetary economics.

==== Eugene Fama ====
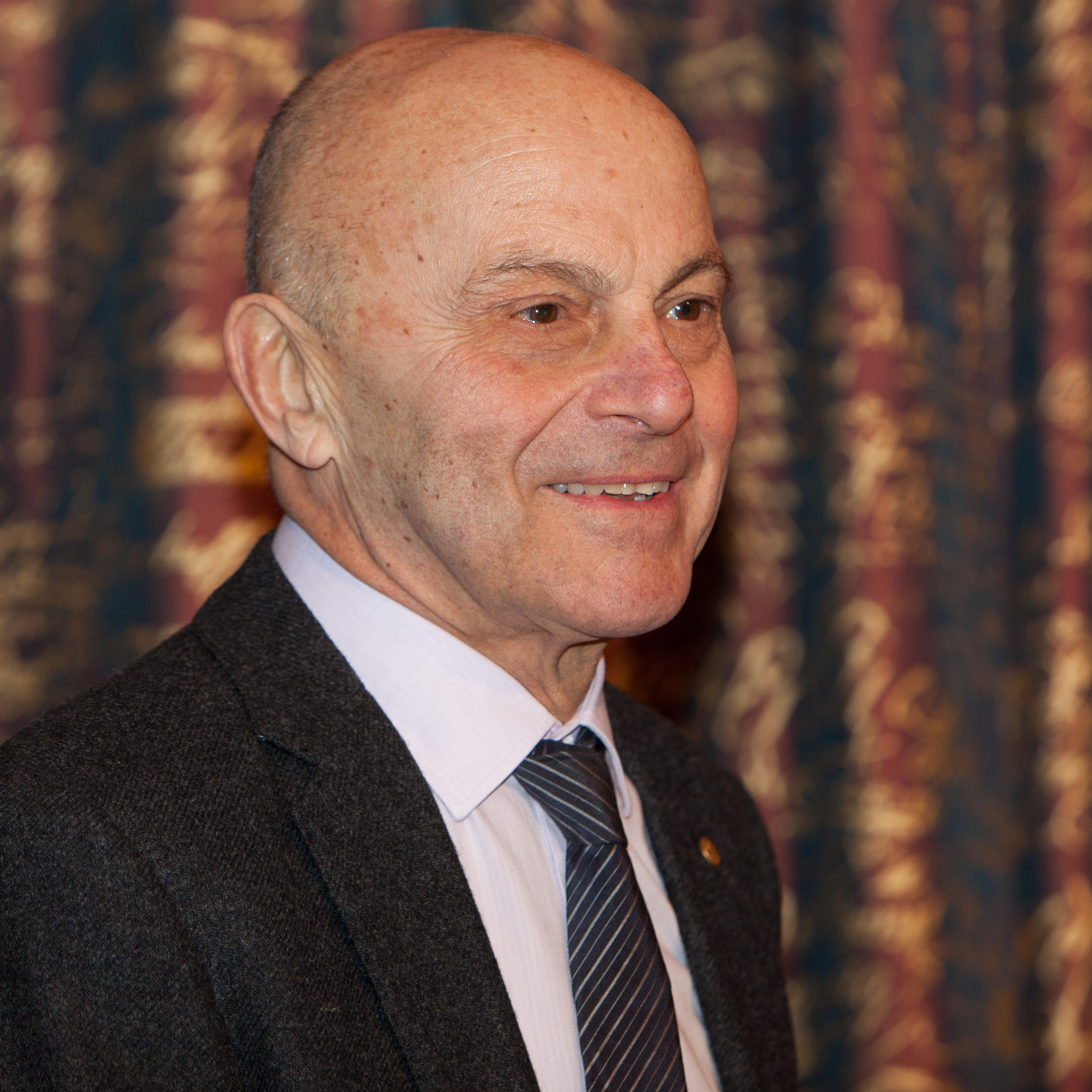
Nobel laureate Gene Fama is often called the "father of modern finance" for his contributions to the study of finance.

Eugene Fama (born 1939) is an American financial economist who was awarded the Nobel Prize in Economics in 2013 for his work on empirical asset pricing and is the fourth most highly cited economist of all time. He has spent all of his teaching career at the University of Chicago and is the originator of the efficient-market hypothesis, first defined in his 1965 article as a market where "at any point in time, the actual price of a security will be a good estimate of its intrinsic value". The notion was further explored in his 1970 article, "Efficient Capital Markets: A Review of Theory and Empirical Work", which brought the notion of efficient markets into the forefront of modern economic theory, and his 1991 article, "Efficient Markets II". Whilst his 1965 PhD thesis, "The Behavior of Stock Market Prices", showed that stock prices can be approximated by a random walk in the short-term; in later work he showed that insofar as stock prices are predictable in the long-term, it is largely due to rational time-varying risk premia which can be modelled using the Fama–French three-factor model (1993, 1996) or their updated five-factor model (2014). His work showing that the value premium can persist despite rational forecasts of future earnings and that the performance of actively managed funds is almost entirely due to chance or exposure to risk are all supportive of an efficient-markets view of the world.

==== Robert Fogel ====
Robert Fogel (1926–2013), a co-winner of the Nobel Prize in 1993, is well known for his historical analysis and his introduction of New economic history, and invention of cliometrics. In his tract, Railroads and American Economic Growth: Essays in Econometric History, Fogel set out to rebut comprehensively the idea that railroads contributed to economic growth in the 19th century. Later, in Time on the Cross: The Economics of American Negro Slavery, he argued that slaves in the Southern states of America had a higher standard of living than the industrial proletariat of the Northern states before the American Civil War.

==== James Heckman ====
James Heckman (born 1944) is a Nobel Prize-winner from 2000, is known for his pioneering work in econometrics and microeconomics.

==== Lars Peter Hansen ====
Lars Peter Hansen (born 1952) is an American economist who won the Nobel Prize in Economics in 2013 with Eugene Fama and Robert Shiller for their work on asset pricing. Hansen began teaching at the University of Chicago in 1981 and is the David Rockefeller Distinguished Service Professor of economics at the University of Chicago. Although best known for his work on the Generalized method of moments, he is also a distinguished macroeconomist, focusing on the linkages between the financial and real sectors of the economy.

==== Richard Posner ====
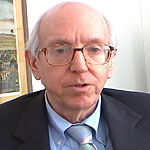
Richard Posner ran a blog with Gary Becker.

Richard Posner (1939–2026) was known primarily for his work in law and economics, though Robert Solow describes Posner's grasp of certain economic ideas as "in some respects,... precarious". A federal appellate judge rather than an economist, Posner's main work, Economic Analysis of Law attempts to apply rational choice models to areas of law. He has chapters on tort, contract, corporations, labor law, but also criminal law, discrimination and family law. Posner goes so far as to say that:

[the central] meaning of justice, perhaps the most common is – efficiency... [because] in a world of scarce resources waste should be regarded as immoral.

=== Related scholars ===
==== Friedrich Hayek ====
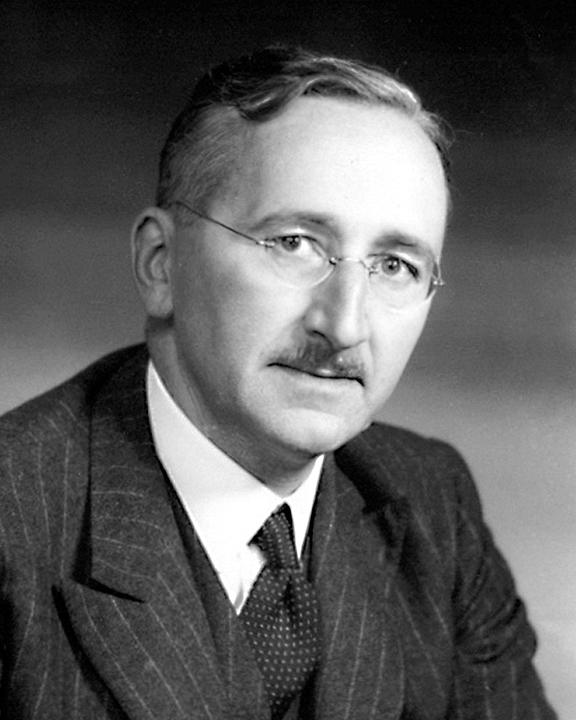
Nobel laureate Friedrich Hayek taught at the University of Chicago for over a decade; his ideas greatly influenced many Chicago economists.

Friedrich Hayek (1899–1992) made frequent contacts with many at the University of Chicago during the 1940s, while he was still at the London School of Economics (he moved to the University of Chicago in 1950). His book The Road to Serfdom, published in the U.S. by the University of Chicago Press in September 1944 with the help of Aaron Director, played a seminal role in transforming how Milton Friedman and others understood how society works. The University Press continued to publish a large number of Hayek's works in later years, such as The Fatal Conceit and The Constitution of Liberty. In 1947, Hayek, Frank Knight, Friedman and George Stigler worked together in forming the Mont Pèlerin Society, an international forum for libertarian economists.

During 1950–1962, Hayek was a faculty member of the Committee of Social Thought at the University of Chicago, where he conducted a number of influential faculty seminars. There were a number of Chicago academics who worked on research projects sympathetic to some of Hayek's own, such as Aaron Director, who was active in the Chicago School in helping to fund and establish what became the "Law and Society" program in the University of Chicago Law School. Hayek and Friedman also cooperated in support of the Intercollegiate Society of Individualists, later renamed the Intercollegiate Studies Institute, an American student organisation devoted to libertarian ideas.

==== James M. Buchanan ====
James M. Buchanan (1919–2013) won the 1986 Nobel Prize in Economics for his public choice theory. He studied under Frank H. Knight at the University of Chicago, receiving PhD in 1948. Although he did not hold any position at the university afterwards, his later work is closely related to the thought of the Chicago school. Buchanan was the foremost proponent of the Virginia school of political economy.

==== Thomas Sowell ====
Thomas Sowell (born in 1930) received his PhD at the University of Chicago in 1968, under George Stigler. A libertarian conservative in his perspective, he is considered to be a representative of the Chicago school.

== Criticisms ==
Paul Douglas, economist and Democratic senator from Illinois for 18 years, was uncomfortable with the environment he found at the university. He stated that, "...I was disconcerted to find that the economic and political conservatives had acquired almost complete dominance over my department and taught that market decisions were always right and profit values the supreme ones... The opinions of my colleagues would have confined government to the eighteenth-century functions of justice, police, and arms, which I thought had been insufficient even for that time and were certainly so for ours. These men would neither use statistical data to develop economic theory nor accept critical analysis of the economic system... (Frank) Knight was now openly hostile, and his disciples seemed to be everywhere. If I stayed, it would be in an unfriendly environment."

While the efficacy of Eugene Fama's efficient-market hypothesis (EMH) was debated after the 2008 financial crisis, proponents emphasized that the EMH is consistent with the large decline in asset prices since the event was unpredictable. Specifically, if market crashes never occurred, this would contradict the EMH since the average return of risky assets would be too large to justify the decreased risk of a large decline in prices; and if anything, the equity premium puzzle implies that market crashes do not happen enough to justify the high Sharpe ratio of US stocks and other risky assets.

Economist Brad DeLong of the University of California, Berkeley says the Chicago School has experienced an "intellectual collapse", while Nobel laureate Paul Krugman of Princeton University says that some recent comments from Chicago school economists are "the product of a Dark Age of macroeconomics in which hard-won knowledge has been forgotten", claiming that most peer-reviewed macroeconomic research since the mid-1960s has been wrong, preferring models developed in the 1930s. Chicago finance economist John Cochrane countered that these criticisms were ad hominem, displayed a "deep and highly politicized ignorance of what economics and finance is really all about", and failed to disentangle bubbles from rational risk premiums and crying wolf too many times in a row, emphasizing that even if these criticisms were true, it would make a stronger argument against regulation and control.

A film titled Chicago Boys, which had a highly critical view of the economic reforms, was released in Chile in November 2015.

== See also ==
- Austrian school of economics
- Chicago plan
- Chicago Boys
- Mainstream economics
- Market monetarism
- Perspectives on capitalism by school of thought
