= Ronald Coase =

British economist and Nobel laureate (1910–2013)

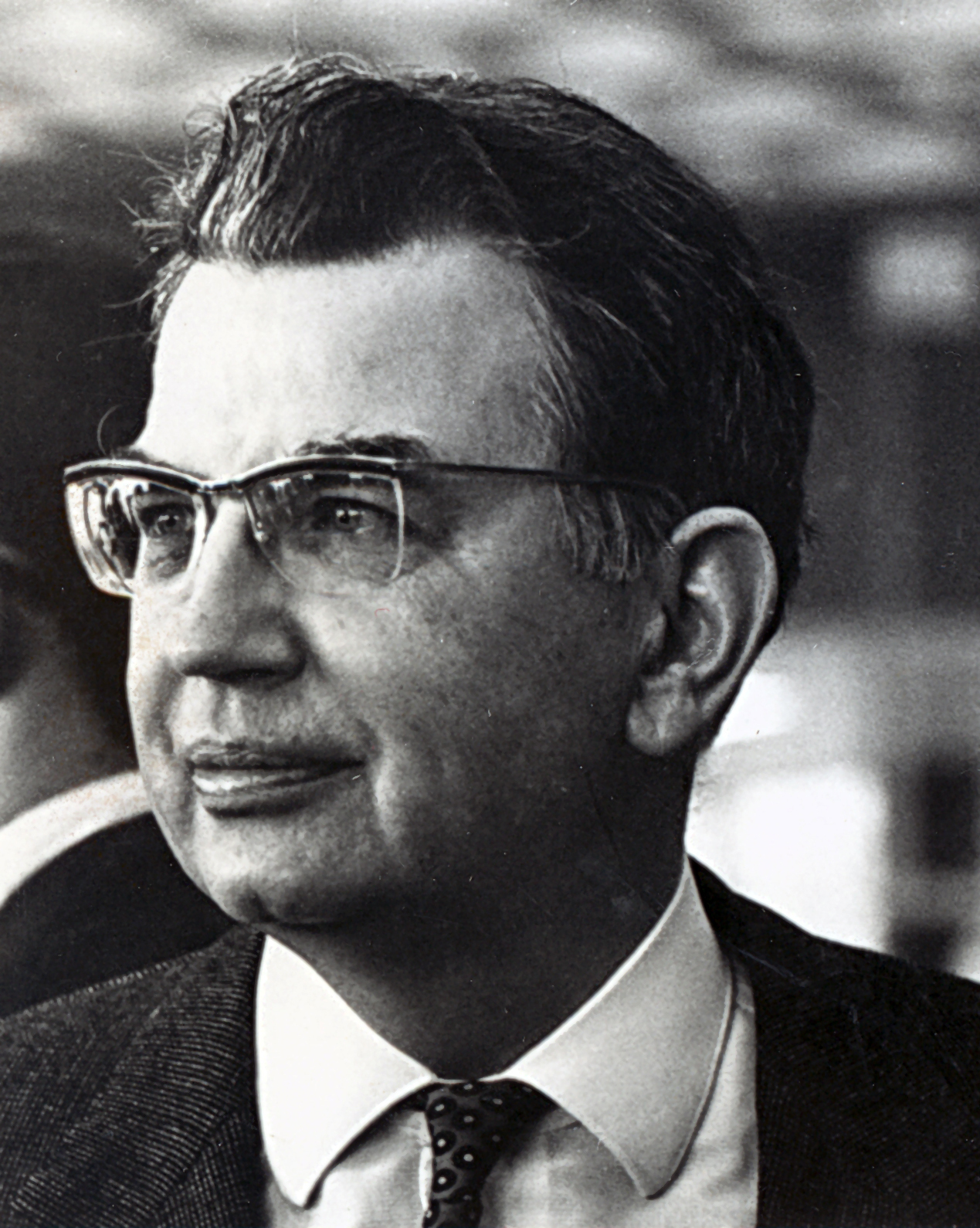
- Born: Ronald Harry Coase; 29 December 1910; Willesden, London, England
- Died: 2 September 2013 (aged 102); Chicago, Illinois, U.S.
- Resting place: Graceland Cemetery, Chicago
- Spouse: Marian Ruth Hartung (m. 1937; died 2012)

Academic background
- Education: London School of Economics (BCom); University of Chicago; University of London (DSc)

Academic work
- Discipline: Law and economics
- School or tradition: New institutional economics; Chicago School of Economics
- Institutions: University of Dundee; London School of Economics; University of Chicago; University of Virginia; University at Buffalo
- Notable ideas: Coase theorem; Analysis of transaction costs; Coase conjecture
- Awards: Nobel Prize in Economics (1991)
- Website: Information at IDEAS / RePEc

Ronald Harry Coase (/koʊs/; 29 December 1910 – 2 September 2013) was a British economist and author. Coase was educated at the London School of Economics, where he was a member of the faculty until 1951. He was the Clifton R. Musser Professor of Economics at the University of Chicago Law School, where he arrived in 1964 and remained for the rest of his life. He received the Nobel Memorial Prize in Economic Sciences in 1991.

Coase believed economists should study real-world wealth creation, in the manner of Adam Smith, stating, "It is suicidal for the field to slide into a hard science of choice, ignoring the influences of society, history, culture, and politics on the working of the economy." He believed economic study should reduce emphasis on price theory or theoretical markets and instead focus on real markets. He established the case for the corporation as a means to pay the costs of operating a marketplace. Coase is best known for two articles: "The Nature of the Firm" (1937), which introduces the concept of transaction costs to explain the nature and limits of firms; and "The Problem of Social Cost" (1960), which suggests that well-defined property rights could overcome the problems of externalities if it were not for transaction costs (see Coase theorem). Additionally, Coase's transaction costs approach has been influential in modern organizational economics, where it was re-introduced by Oliver E. Williamson.

== Biography ==
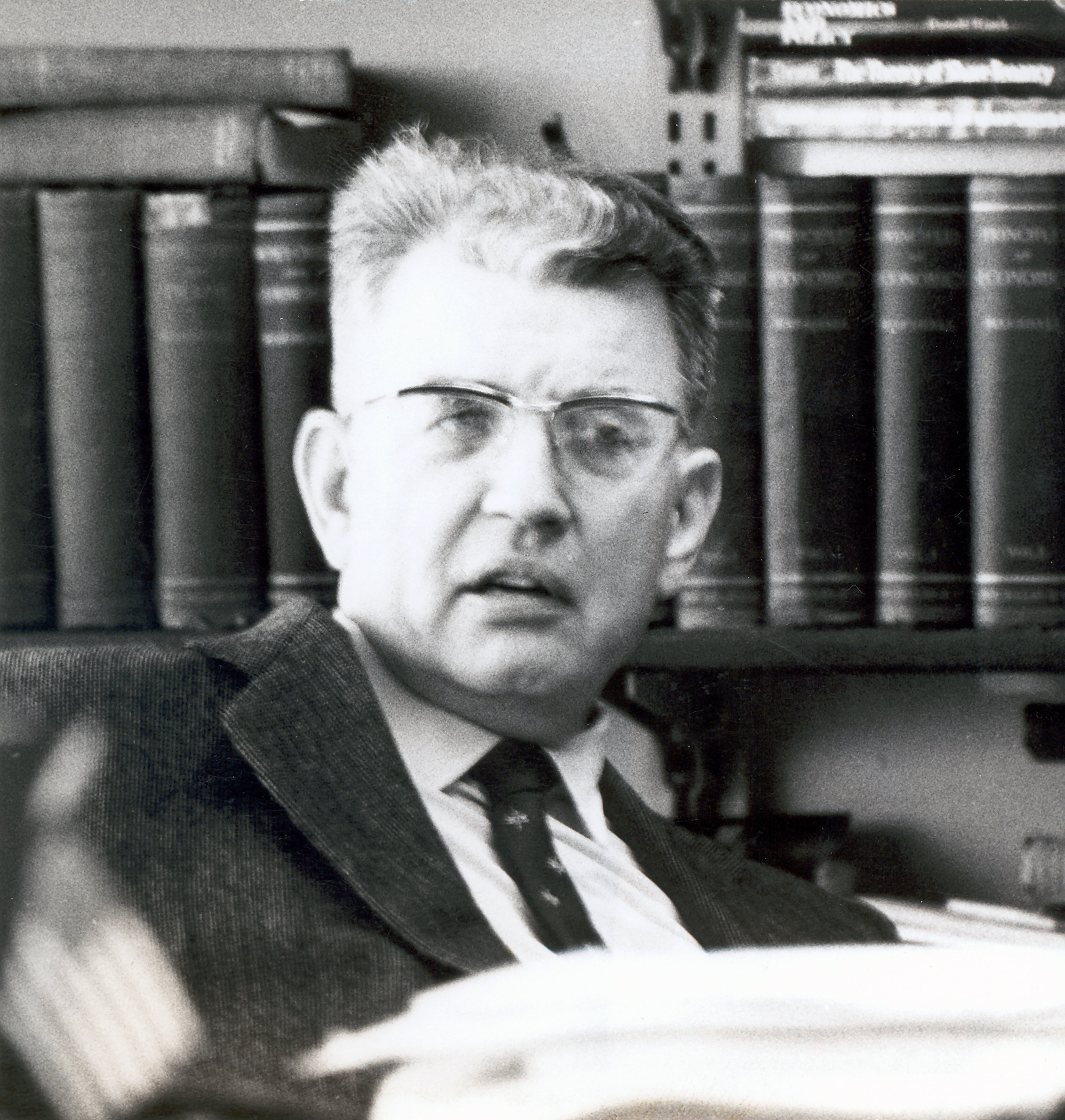
Ronald Coase

Ronald Harry Coase was born in Willesden, a suburb of London, on 29 December 1910. His father, Henry Joseph Coase (1884–1973) was a telegraphist for the post office, as was his mother, Rosalie Elizabeth Coase (née Giles; 1882–1972), before marriage. As a child, Coase had a weakness in his legs, for which he was required to wear leg-irons. Due to this problem, he attended the school for physical defectives. At the age of 12, he was able to enter Kilburn Grammar School on scholarship. At Kilburn, he studied for the intermediate examination of the University of London as an external student in 1927–29.

Coase then continued his studies at the University of London, enrolling as an internal student of the London School of Economics, where he took courses with Arnold Plant and received a Bachelor of Commerce degree in 1932. During his undergraduate studies, Coase received the Sir Ernest Cassel Travelling Scholarship which he used to visit the University of Chicago in 1931–1932 studying with Frank Knight and Jacob Viner. Coase's colleagues would later admit that they did not remember this first visit. Between 1932 and 1934, Coase was an assistant lecturer at the Dundee School of Economics and Commerce, which later became part of the University of Dundee. Subsequently, Coase was an assistant lecturer in commerce at the University of Liverpool between 1934 and 1935 before returning to London School of Economics as a member of staff until 1951 in which year he was awarded an earned doctorate in economics from the University of London. He then started to work at the University at Buffalo and retained his British citizenship after moving to the United States in the 1950s. In 1958, he moved to the University of Virginia. Coase settled at the University of Chicago in 1964 and became the co-editor of the Journal of Law and Economics with Aaron Director. He was also for a time a trustee of the Philadelphia Society. He received the Nobel Prize in Economics in 1991.

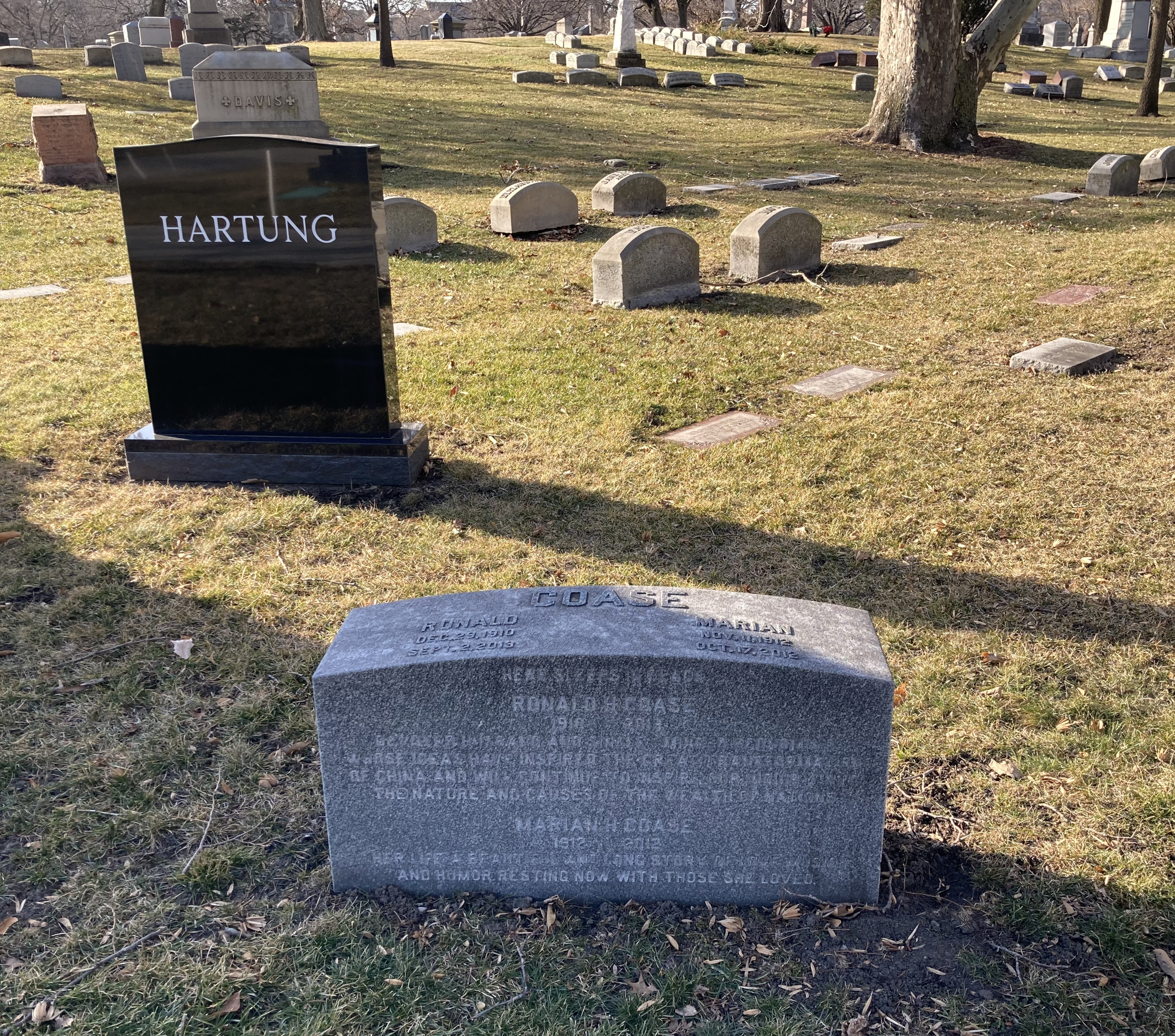
Ronald Harry Coase's grave at Graceland Cemetery. The epitaph reads: "Here Sleeps in Peace RONALD H. COASE 1910 - 2013 Devoted husband and single-minded economist, whose ideas have inspired the great transformation of China and will continue to inspire our inquiry into the nature and causes of the wealth of nations."

Nearing his 100th birthday, Coase was working on a book concerning the rise of the economies of China and Vietnam. In an interview, Coase explained the mission of the Coase China Society and his vision of economics and the part to be played by Chinese economists. This became "How China Became Capitalist" (2012) co-authored with Ning Wang. Coase was honoured and received an honorary doctorate from the university at Buffalo Department of Economics in May 2012.

Coase married Marian Ruth Hartung of Chicago, Illinois in Willesden, England, 7 August 1937. Although they were unable to have children, they were married 75 years until her death on 17 October 2012, making him one of the longest-married Nobel Prize laureates. Coase himself died in Chicago on 2 September 2013, at the age of 102. Both are buried at Graceland Cemetery in Chicago.

He was praised across the political spectrum, with Slate calling him "one of the most distinguished economists in the world" and Forbes calling him "the greatest of the many great University of Chicago economists". The Washington Post called his work over eight decades "impossible to summarize" while recommending five of his papers to read.

== Contributions to economics ==
=== "The Nature of the Firm" ===
In "The Nature of the Firm" (1937), a brief but highly influential essay, Coase attempts to explain why the economy features a number of business firms instead of consisting exclusively of a multitude of independent, self-employed people who contract with one another. Given that "production could be carried on without any organization [that is, firms] at all", Coase asks, why and under what conditions should we expect firms to emerge?

Since modern firms can only emerge when an entrepreneur of some sort begins to hire people, Coase's analysis proceeds by considering the conditions under which it makes sense for an entrepreneur to seek hired help instead of contracting out for some particular task.

The traditional economic theory of the time (in the tradition of Adam Smith) suggested that, because the market is "efficient" (that is, those who are best at providing each good or service most cheaply are already doing so), it should always be cheaper to contract out than to hire.

Coase noted, however, a number of transaction costs involved in using the market; the cost of obtaining a good or service via the market actually exceeds the price of the good. Other costs, including search and information costs, bargaining costs, keeping trade secrets, and policing and enforcement costs, can all potentially add to the cost of procuring something from another party. This suggests that firms will arise which can internalise the production of goods and services required to deliver a product, thus avoiding these costs. This argument sets the stage for the later contributions by Oliver Williamson: markets and hierarchies are alternative co-ordination mechanisms for economic transactions.

There is a natural limit to what a firm can produce internally, however. Coase notices "decreasing returns to the entrepreneur function", including increasing overhead costs and increasing propensity for an overwhelmed manager to make mistakes in resource allocation. These factors become countervailing costs to the use of the firm.

Coase argues that the size of a firm (as measured by how many contractual relations are "internal" to the firm and how many "external") is a result of finding an optimal balance between the competing tendencies of the costs outlined above. In general, making the firm larger will initially be advantageous, but the decreasing returns indicated above will eventually kick in, preventing the firm from growing indefinitely.

Other things being equal, therefore, a firm will tend to be larger:

- the lower the costs of organising and the slower these costs rise with an increase in the number of transactions organised
- the less likely the entrepreneur is to make mistakes and the smaller the increase in mistakes with an increase in the transactions organised
- the greater the lowering (or the smaller the rise) in the supply price of factors of production to firms of larger size

The first two costs will increase with the spatial distribution of the transactions organised and the dissimilarity of the transactions. This explains why firms tend to either be in different geographic locations or to perform different functions. Additionally, technology changes that mitigate the cost of organising transactions across space may allow firms to become larger – the advent of the telephone and of cheap air travel, for example, would be expected to increase the size of firms.

A further exploration of the dichotomy between markets and hierarchies as co-ordination mechanisms for economic transactions derived a third alternative way called Commons based peer production, in which individuals successfully collaborate on large-scale projects following a diverse cluster of motivational drives and social signals.

=== "The Problem of Social Cost" ===
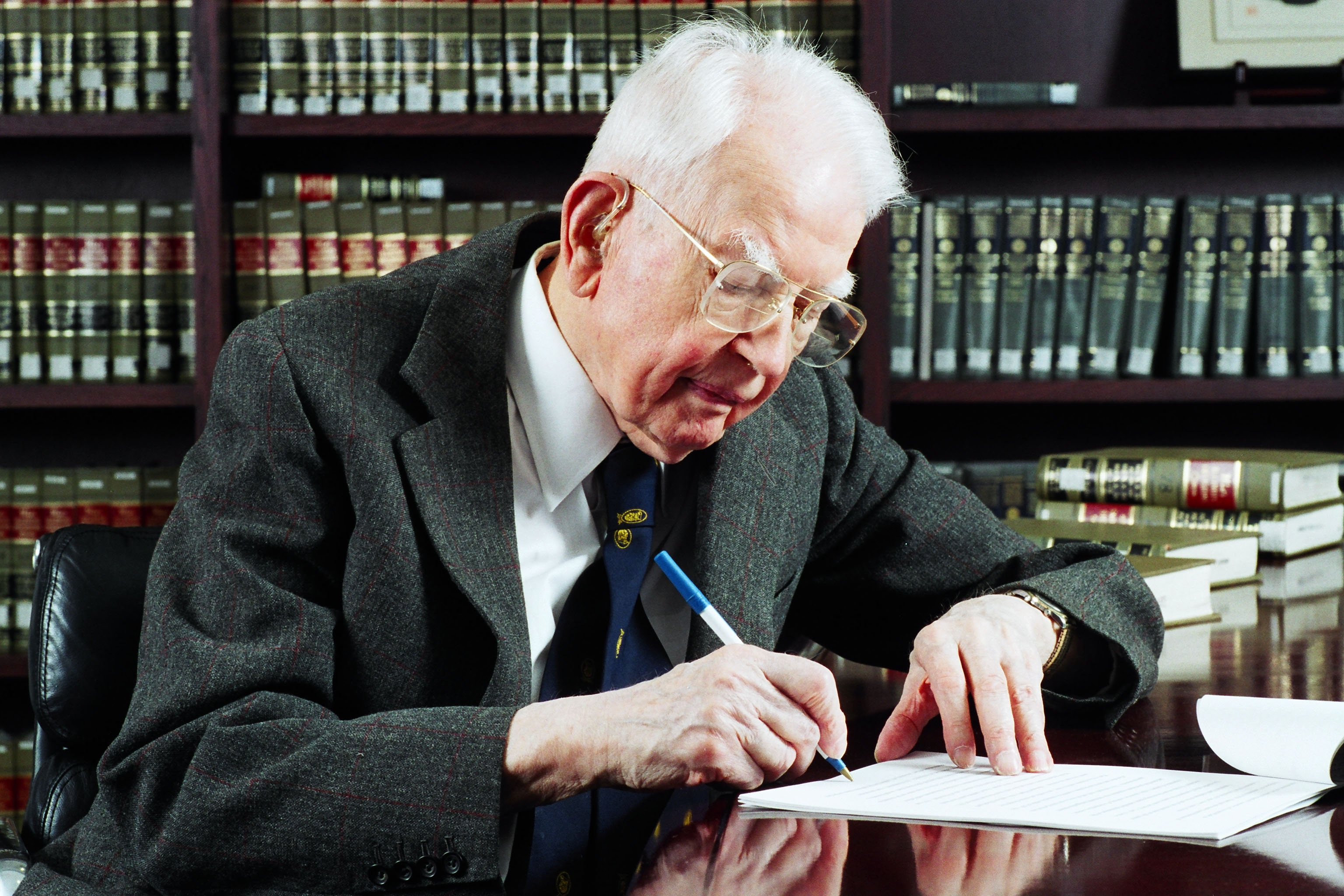
Coase at the University of Chicago Law School in 2003

Upon publishing his article The Federal Communications Commission in 1959, Coase received negative feedback from the faculty at the University of Chicago over his conclusions and apparent conflicts with A.C. Pigou. According to Coase, "What I said was thought to run counter to Pigou's analysis by a number of economists at the University of Chicago and was therefore, according to them, wrong. At a meeting in Chicago I was able to convince these economists that I was right and Pigou's analysis faulty." Coase had presented his paper in 1960 during a seminar in Chicago, to twenty senior economist including George Stigler and Milton Friedman. He gradually won over the usually skeptic audience, in what has later been considered a "paradigm-shifting moment" in the genesis of Chicago Law and Economics. Coase would join the Chicago faculty four years later.

Published in the Journal of Law and Economics in 1960, while Coase was a member of the Economics department at the University of Virginia, "The Problem of Social Cost" provided the key insight that it is unclear where the blame for externalities lies. The example he gave was of a rancher whose cattle stray onto the cropland of his neighbour. If the rancher is made to restrict his cattle, he is harmed just as the farmer is if the cattle remain unrestrained.

Coase argued that without transaction costs the initial assignment of property rights makes no difference to whether or not the farmer and rancher can achieve the economically efficient outcome. If the cost of restraining cattle by, say, building a fence, is less than the cost of crop damage, the fence will be built. The initial assignment of property rights determines who builds the fence. If the farmer is responsible for the crop damage, the farmer will pay for the fence (as long the fence costs less than the crop damage). The allocation of property rights is primarily an equity issue, with consequences for the distribution of income and wealth, rather than an efficiency issue.

With sufficient transaction costs, initial property rights matter for both equity and efficiency. From the point of view of economic efficiency, property rights should be assigned such that the owner of the rights wants to take the economically efficient action. To elaborate, if it is efficient not to restrict the cattle, the rancher should be given the rights (so that cattle can move about freely), whereas if it is efficient to restrict the cattle, the farmer should be given the rights over the movement of the cattle (so the cattle are restricted).

This seminal argument forms the basis of the famous Coase theorem as labelled by Stigler. In 1990, Coase wrote that he feared "The Problem of Social Cost" had been widely misunderstood.

=== Law and economics ===
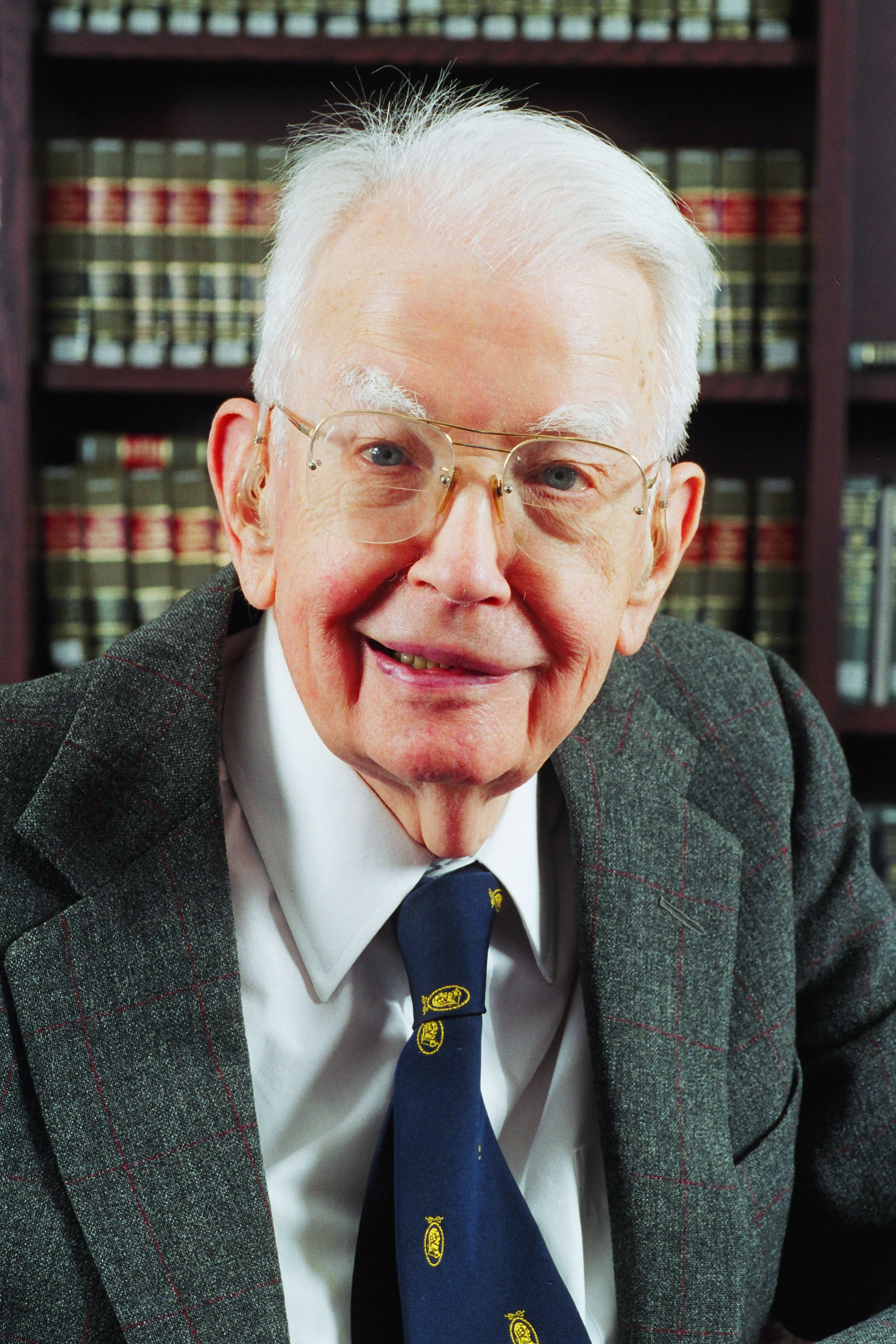
Coase at the University of Chicago Law School

Though trained as an economist, Coase spent much of his career working in a law school. He is a central figure in the development of the subfield of law and economics. He viewed law and economics as having two parts, the first "using the economists' approach and concepts to analyze the working of the legal system, often called the economic analysis of the law"; and the second "a study of the influence of the legal system on the working of the economic system." Coase said that the second part "is the part of law and economics in which I am most interested."

In his Simons Lecture celebrating the centennial of the University of Chicago, titled "Law and Economics at Chicago", Coase noted that he only accidentally wandered into the field:

It is generally agreed that this article has had an immense influence on legal scholarship, but this was no part of my intention. For me, 'The Problem of Social Cost' was an essay in economics. It was aimed at economists. What I wanted to do was to improve our analysis of the working of the economic system. Law came into article because, in a regime of positive transaction costs, the character of the law becomes one of the main factors determining the performance of the economy. If transaction costs were zero (as is assumed in standard economic theory) we can imagine people contracting around the law whenever the value of production would be increased by a change in the legal position. But in a regime of positive transaction costs, such contracting would not occur whenever transaction costs were greater than the gain that such a redistribution of rights would bring. As a consequence the rights which individuals possess will commonly be those established by the law, which in these circumstances can be said to control the economy. As I have said, in 'The Problem of Social Cost' I had no intention of making a contribution to legal scholarship. I referred to legal cases because they afforded examples of real situations as against the imaginary ones normally used by economists in their analysis. It was undoubtedly an economist who invented the widget. But in 'The Problem of Social Cost' I did something else. I pointed out that the judges in their opinions often seemed to show a better understanding of the economic problem than did many economists even though their views were not always expressed in a very explicit fashion. I did this not to praise the judges but to shame economists.

Despite wandering accidentally into law and economics, the opportunity to edit the Journal of Law and Economics was instrumental in bringing him to the University of Chicago:

[W]hen I was approached to fill Aaron Director's place on his retirement, what I found most attractive about coming to Chicago was the opportunity it gave me of editing the Journal. Indeed, it is probable that without the Journal I would not have come to Chicago. I knew nothing of the original aim of the Journal. What I wanted to do was to encourage the type of research which I had advocated in 'The Problem of Social Cost', and I used my editorship of the Journal as a means of bringing this about.

Coase believed that the University of Chicago was the intellectual center of law and economics. He concluded his Simons lecture by stating:

I am very much aware that, in concentrating in this lecture on law and economics at Chicago, I have neglected other significant contributions to the subject made elsewhere such as those by Guido Calabresi at Yale, by Donald Turner at Harvard, and by others. But it can hardly be denied that in the emergence of the subject of law and economics, Chicago has played a very significant part and one of which the University can be proud.

=== Coase theorem ===
In law and economics, the Coase theorem (/ˈkoʊs/) describes the economic efficiency of an economic allocation or outcome in the presence of externalities. The theorem states that if trade in an externality is possible and there are sufficiently low transaction costs, bargaining will lead to a Pareto efficient outcome regardless of the initial allocation of property. In practice, obstacles to bargaining or poorly defined property rights can prevent Coasean bargaining. This 'theorem' is commonly attributed to Coase.

=== Coase conjecture ===
Another important contribution of Coase is the Coase conjecture, which is an informal argument that durable goods monopolists do not have market power because they are unable to commit to not lowering their prices in future periods.

== Political views ==
When asked what he considered his politics to be, Coase stated,

I really don't know. I don't reject any policy without considering what its results are. If someone says there's going to be regulation, I don't say that regulation will be bad. Let's see. What we discover is that most regulation does produce, or has produced in recent times, a worse result. But I wouldn't like to say that all regulation would have this effect because one can think of circumstances in which it doesn't.

Coase admitted that early in life, he aligned himself with socialism.

As a young man I was a Socialist. The first challenge to this belief came when, in 1931, 5 months before I took the final examinations for the B.Com. degree, I attended Arnold Plant's seminar at the London School of Economics (LSE). He introduced me to Adam Smith's invisible hand and to the advantages of a competitive system. He also pointed out that government schemes in the economic sphere were often ill-conceived and were introduced to placate special interests. I adopted many of Plant's positions but continued to regard myself as a Socialist. That this meant holding what could be considered, and were, inconsistent positions was not unusual at that time. Abba Lerner, a fellow student and a fine theorist, with whom I had a very friendly relation, also believed in the virtues of a competitive system but was even more attached to Socialism than I was.

Guido Calabresi wrote that Coase's focus on transaction costs in The Nature of the Firm was the result of his socialist beliefs. Reflecting on this, Coase wrote: "It is very difficult to know where one's ideas come from but for all I know he may well be right." Coase continued:

My socialist sympathies gradually fell away and this process was accentuated as a result of being assigned in 1935 at LSE the course on the Economics of Public Utilities. I soon found out that very little was known about British public utilities and I set about making a series of historical studies on the water, gas, and electricity supply industries and of the Post Office and broadcasting. These researches taught me much about the public utility industries and they certainly made me aware of the defects of government operation of these industries, whether municipal or through nationalisation. These researches were interrupted by the war, when I joined the civil service, at first, for a short period, in the Forestry Commission, then responsible for timber production, and for the rest of the war, in the Central Statistical Office, one of the offices of the War Cabinet. This war-time experience did not significantly influence my views but I could not help noticing that, with the country in mortal danger and despite the leadership of Winston Churchill, government departments often seemed more concerned to defend their own interests than those of the country.

== Ronald Coase Institute ==
Coase was research advisor to the Ronald Coase Institute, an organisation that promotes research on institutions and organizations – the laws, rules, customs, and norms – that govern real economic systems, with particular support for young scholars from developing and transitional countries.

== Coase-Sandor Institute for Law and Economics ==
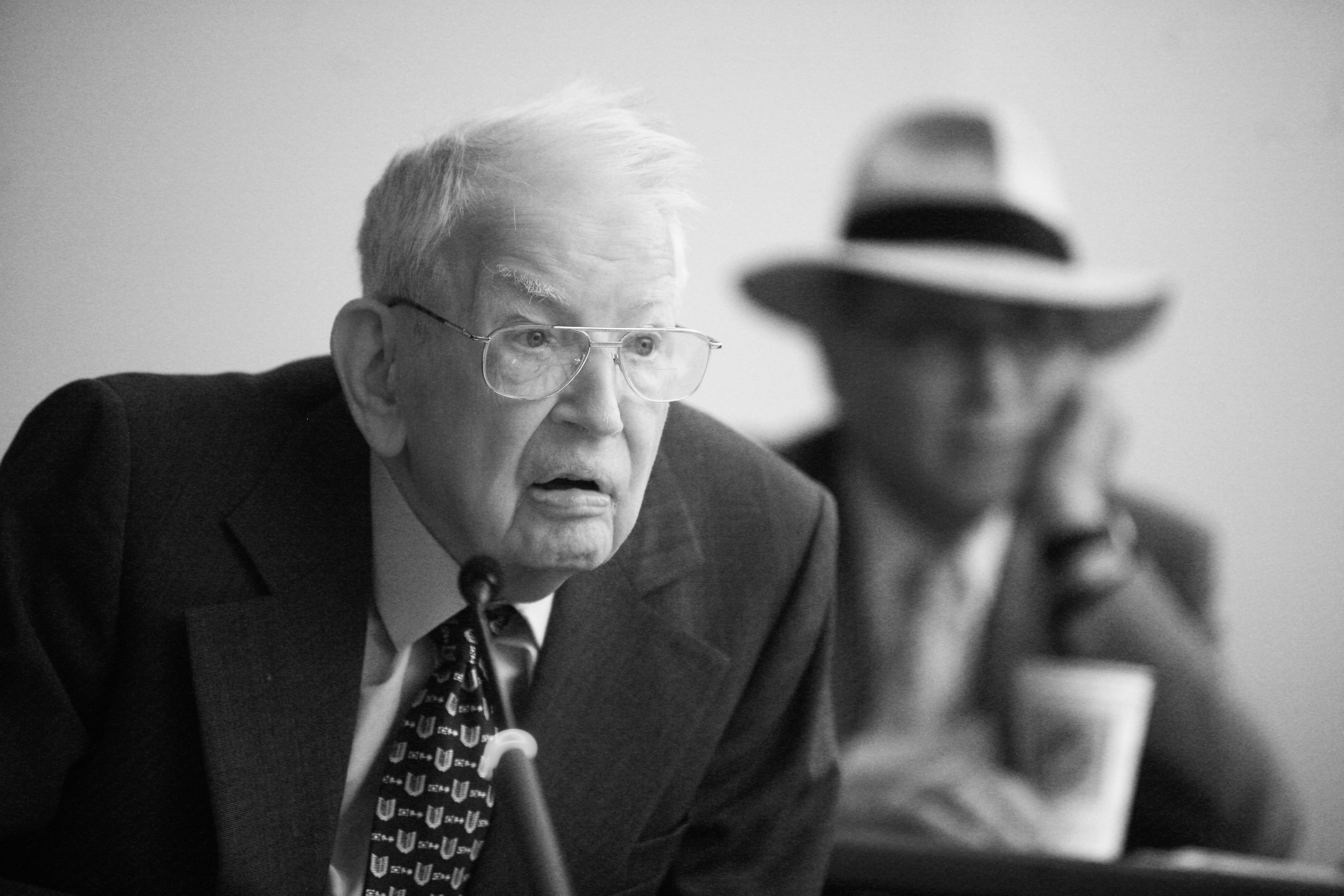
Coase at a conference in 2008 with Richard Sandor

The University of Chicago Law School carries on the legacy of Ronald Coase through the mission of the Coase-Sandor Institute for Law and Economics. Each year, the University of Chicago Law School hosts the Coase Lecture, which was delivered in 2003 by Ronald Coase himself.

== Publications ==
- Coase, R.H. (February 1935). "The Problem of Duopoly Reconsidered". The Review of Economic Studies. 2 (2): 137–143. doi:10.2307/2967560. JSTOR 2967560.
- Coase, R.H.; Fowler, R.F. (May 1935). "Bacon Production and the Pig-Cycle in Great Britain". Economica. New Series. 2 (6): 142-167. doi:10.2307/2548676. JSTOR 2548676.
- Coase, R.H.; Fowler, R.F. (February 1937). "The Pig-Cycle in Great Britain: An Explanation". Economica. New Series. 4 (13): 55–82. doi:10.2307/2548787. JSTOR 2548787.
- Coase, R.H. (1937). "The Nature of the Firm". Economica. 4 (16): 386–405. doi:10.1111/j.1468-0335.1937.tb00002.x. JSTOR 2626876.
- Coase, R.H. (October 1937). "Some Notes on Monopoly Price". The Review of Economic Studies. 5 (1): 17–31. doi:10.2307/2967577. JSTOR 2967577.
- Coase, R.H. (October–December 1938). "Business Organization and the Accountant". The Accountant., reprinted as Coase, R.H. (1952). "Business Organization and the Accountant". In David Solomons (ed.). Studies in Costing. London: Sweet and Maxwell. pp. 105–158.
- Coase, R.H. (November 1939). "Rowland Hill and the Penny Post". Economica. New Series. 6 (24): 423–435. doi:10.2307/2548883. JSTOR 2548883.
- Coase, R.H.; Fowler, R.F. (August 1940). "The Analysis of Producers' Expectations". Economica. New Series. 7 (27): 280-292. doi:10.2307/2549744. JSTOR 2549744.
- Coase, R.H. (April 1945). "Price and Output Policy of State Enterprise: A Comment". The Economic Journal. 55 (217): 112–113. doi:10.2307/2225899. JSTOR 2225899.
- Coase, R.H. (August 1946). "The Marginal Cost Controversy". Economica. New Series. 13 (51): 169–182. doi:10.2307/2549764. JSTOR 2549764.
- Coase, R.H. (May 1947). "The Marginal Cost Controversy: Some Further Comments". Economica. New Series. 14 (54): 150–153. doi:10.2307/2549490. JSTOR 2549490.
- Coase, R.H. (August 1947). "The Origin of the Monopoly of Broadcasting in Great Britain". Economica. New Series. 14 (55): 189–210. doi:10.2307/2549788. JSTOR 2549788.
- Coase, R.H. (August 1948). "Wire Broadcasting in Great Britain". Economica. New Series. 15 (59): 194–220. doi:10.2307/2549403. JSTOR 2549403.
- Coase, R.H. (1950). British Broadcasting: A Study in Monopoly. London: Longmans, Green and Co. – via Internet Archive.
- Coase, R.H. (February 1950). "The Nationalization of Electricity Supply in Great Britain". Land Economics. 26 (1): 1–16. Bibcode:1950LandE..26....1C. doi:10.2307/3159326. JSTOR 3159326.
- Coase, R.H. (August 1954). "The Development of the British Television Service". Land Economics. 30 (3): 207–222. Bibcode:1954LandE..30..207C. doi:10.2307/3144375. JSTOR 3144375.
- Coase, R.H. (October 1959). "The Federal Communications Commission". The Journal of Law & Economics. 2: 1–40. doi:10.1086/466549. JSTOR 724927.
- Coase, R.H. (1960). "The Problem of Social Cost". Journal of Law and Economics. 3 (1): 1–44. doi:10.1086/466560. JSTOR 724810. S2CID 222331226.
- Coase, R.H. (October 1961). "The British Post Office and the Messenger Companies". The Journal of Law & Economics. 4: 12–65. doi:10.1086/466570. JSTOR 724905.
- Coase, R.H. (May 1965). "Evaluation of Public Policy Relating to Radio and Television Broadcasting: Social and Economic Issues". Land Economics. 41 (2): 161–167. Bibcode:1965LandE..41..161C. doi:10.2307/3144271. JSTOR 3144271.
- Coase, R.H. (October 1966). "In Honor of Aaron Director". The Journal of Law & Economics. 9: 1. doi:10.1086/466614. JSTOR 724988.
- Coase, R.H. (Spring 1970). "The Theory of Public Utility Pricing and Its Application". The Bell Journal of Economics and Management Science. 1 (1): 113–128. doi:10.2307/3003025. JSTOR 3003025.
- Coase, R.H. (1972). "Durability and Monopoly". Journal of Law and Economics. 15 (1): 143–49. doi:10.1086/466731. JSTOR 725018. S2CID 155011558.
- Coase, R.H. (October 1972). "The Appointment of Pigou as Marshall's Successor". The Journal of Law & Economics. 15 (2): 473–485. doi:10.1086/466750. JSTOR 724807.
- Coase, R.H. (1974). "The Lighthouse in Economics". Journal of Law and Economics. 17 (2): 357–76. doi:10.1086/466796. JSTOR 724895. S2CID 153715526.
- Coase, R.H. (May 1974). "The Market for Goods and the Market for Ideas". The American Economic Review. 64 (2 Papers and Proceedings of the Eighty-sixth Annual Meeting of the American Economic Association): 384–391. JSTOR 1816070.
- Coase, R.H. (October 1974). "The Choice of the Institutional Framework: A Comment". The Journal of Law & Economics. 17 (2): 493–496. doi:10.1086/466803. JSTOR 724902.
- Coase, R.H. (April 1975). "Marshall on Method". The Journal of Law & Economics. 18 (1): 25–31. doi:10.1086/466805. JSTOR 725245.
- Coase, R.H. (October 1976). "Adam Smith's View of Man". The Journal of Law & Economics. 19 (3): 529–546. doi:10.1086/466886. JSTOR 725080.
- Coase, R.H. (January 1977). "Advertising and Free Speech". The Journal of Legal Studies. 6 (1): 1–34. doi:10.1086/467560. JSTOR 724187.
- Coase, R.H. (July 1977). "The Wealth of Nations". Economic Inquiry. 15 (3): 309-325. doi:10.1111/j.1465-7295.1977.tb00478.x.
- Coase, R.H. (June 1978). "Economics and Contiguous Disciplines". The Journal of Legal Studies. 7 (2): 201–211. doi:10.1086/467590. JSTOR 724212.
- Coase, R.H. (October 1979). "Payola in Radio and Television Broadcasting". The Journal of Law & Economics. 22 (2): 269–328. doi:10.1086/466944. JSTOR 725120.
- Coase, R.H. (April 1981). "The Coase Theorem and the Empty Core: A Comment". The Journal of Law & Economics. 24 (1): 183–187. doi:10.1086/466980. JSTOR 725209.
- Coase, R.H. (1982). "Economics at LSE in the 1930's: A personal view". Atlantic Economic Journal. 10: 31–34. doi:10.1007/BF02299944.
- Coase, R.H. (March 1984). "The New Institutional Economics". Zeitschrift für die gesamte Staatswissenschaft / Journal of Institutional and Theoretical Economics. 140 (1 The New Institutional Economics: A Symposium): 229–231. JSTOR 40750690.
- Coase, R.H. (1984). "Alfred Marshall's Mother and Father". History of Political Economy. 16 (4): 519–527. doi:10.1215/00182702-16-4-519.
- Coase, Ronald (1986). "Sir Arnold Plant: His Ideas and Influence". In Anderson, Martin J. (ed.). The Unfinished Agenda: Essays on the Political Economy of Government Policy in Honour of Arthur Seldon. London: The Institute of Economic Affairs. pp. 79-90 – via Internet Archive.
- Coase, R.H. (1988). The Firm the Market and the Law. Chicago: The University of Chicago Press. ISBN 0226111016.
- Coase, R.H. (Spring 1988). "The Nature of the Firm: Origin". Journal of Law, Economics, & Organization. 4 (1): 3–17. JSTOR 765011.
- Coase, R.H. (Spring 1988). "The Nature of the Firm: Meaning". Journal of Law, Economics, & Organization. 4 (1): 19–32. JSTOR 765012.
- Coase, R.H. (Spring 1988). "The Nature of the Firm: Influence". Journal of Law, Economics, & Organization. 4 (1): 33–47. JSTOR 765013.
- Coase, R.H. (May 1988). "Blackmail". Virginia Law Review. 74 (4): 655–676. doi:10.2307/1073121. JSTOR 1073121.
- Coase, R.H. (1990). "Alfred Marshall's family and ancestry". In Rita McWilliams Tullberg (ed.). Alfred Marshall in Retrospect. Aldershot, Hants and Brookfield, Vermont: Edward Elgar. p. 9-27. ISBN 978-1-85278-344-0 – via Internet Archive.
- Coase, R.H. (1991). "George Stigler". In Shils, Edward (ed.). Remembering the University of Chicago: Teachers, Scientists and Scholars. Chicago and London: The University of Chicago Press. pp. 469-478 – via Internet Archive.
- Coase, R.H. "Duncan Black 1908-1991" (PDF). Biographical Memoirs of Fellows of the British Academy (PBA 82).
- Coase, R.H. (1992). "The Institutional Structure of Production". American Economic Review. 82 (4): 713–19. JSTOR 2117340. (Nobel Prize lecture)
- Coase, R.H. (1993). "Law and Economics at Chicago". Journal of Law and Economics. 36 (1): 239–54. doi:10.1086/467274. JSTOR 725475. S2CID 153402423.
- Coase, R.H. (1994). Essays on Economics and Economists. Chicago: The University of Chicago Press. ISBN 0226111032.
- Coase, R.H. (1996). "Law and Economics and A.W. Brian Simpson". Journal of Legal Studies. 25 (1): 103–19. doi:10.1086/467973. JSTOR 724523. S2CID 146511123.
- Coase, Ronald (2000). "The Acquisition of Fisher Body by General Motors". The Journal of Law & Economics. 43 (1): 15–32. doi:10.1086/467446. JSTOR 10.1086/467446. S2CID 154712364.
- Coase, Ronald (2006). "The Conduct of Economics: The Example of Fisher Body and General Motors". Journal of Economics & Management Strategy. 15 (2): 255–78. CiteSeerX 10.1.1.424.5083. doi:10.1111/j.1530-9134.2006.00100.x. S2CID 154100464.
- Coase, Ronald; Wang, Ning (2011). "The Industrial Structure of Production: A Research Agenda for Innovation in an Entrepreneurial Economy". Entrepreneurship Research Journal. 2 (1) 20122002. doi:10.2202/2157-5665.1026. S2CID 154727631.
- Coase, Ronald; Ning Wang (2012). How China Became Capitalist. Palgrave Macmillan. ISBN 978-1137019363..

== See also ==
- Government failure
- Horizontal integration
- List of think tanks
- Vertical integration

Awards
| Preceded by Harry M. Markowitz; Merton H. Miller; William F. Sharpe | Laureate of the Nobel Memorial Prize in Economics; 1991 | Succeeded by Gary S. Becker |
