= Arnold Plant =

British economist (1898–1978)

Sir Arnold Plant
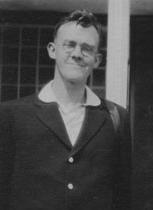
- Plant in the 1920s
- Born: 29 April 1898; Hoxton, London, England
- Died: 19 April 1978 (aged 79); Camden, London, England
- Spouse: Edith Render (m. 1925)
- Children: 2 sons
- Parent(s): William Charles Plant (father); Thomasine Emily Plant (mother)

Academic background
- Education: London School of Economics
- Influences: David Hume; Edwin Cannan; F. A. Hayek

Academic work
- Institutions: University of Cape Town; London School of Economics
- Notable students: Ronald Coase

Sir Arnold Plant (29 April 1898 – 19 April 1978) was a British economist.

== Biography ==
Plant was born in Hoxton, London, the son of a municipal librarian, William Charles Plant, and Thomasine Emily Plant. After attending Strand School, he worked for a mechanical engineering organisation. At the advice of William Piercy, he set out to learn about management. In 1916 he attempted to enlist for military service, but his bad eyesight meant that he was initially unsuccessful. However, with the increasing demand for military manpower, the regulations were relaxed and he was able to enlist as a private in the 4th Battalion of the Royal West Kent regiment in 1918. He was demobilised in January 1919 and worked as General Manager of the Steam Fittings Company from January 1919 to July 1920. He obtained a BCom degree (1922) and a BSc degree in Economics (1923; specialising in modern economic history) from the London School of Economics.

He worked as a professor at the University of Cape Town (1923–1930) and at the London School of Economics (1930–1965).

Plant's 1934 paper on patents, "The Economic Theory Concerning Patents for Inventions", is considered a classic.

In 1947, he was knighted. He died in 1978. His widow, Edith, Lady Plant, died a decade later.

== Published work (selection) ==
- Plant, Arnold (1927). "The relations between banking and the State in the Union of South Africa". In Gregory, T.E.; Dalton, Hugh (eds.). London Essays in Economics: In Honour of Edwin Cannan. London: George Routledge & Sons Ltd. – via Internet Archive.
- Plant, Arnold (February 1932). "Trends in Business Administration". Economica (35): 45–62. doi:10.2307/2548975. JSTOR 2548975.
- Plant, Arnold (February 1934). "The Economic Theory Concerning Patents for Inventions". Economica. New Series. 1 (1): 30–51. doi:10.2307/2548573. JSTOR 2548573.
- Plant, Arnold (May 1934). "The Economic Aspects of Copyright in Books". Economica. New Series. 1 (2): 167–195. doi:10.2307/2548748. JSTOR 2548748.
- Plant, Arnold (1936). "Chapter XXIX: Economic Development 1795-1921". In Newton, A. P.; Benians, E. A. (eds.). The Cambridge History of the British Empire. Vol. VIII (South Africa, Rhodesia, The Protectorates). Cambridge University Press. pp. 759-807 – via Internet Archive.
- Plant, Arnold (1937). "Centralize or Decentralize?". In Plant, Arnold (ed.). Some Modern Business Problems. Free Port, New York: Books for Libraries Press Inc. pp. 1–34 – via Internet Archive.
- Plant, Arnold (1937). "The Distribution of Proprietary Articles". In Plant, Arnold (ed.). Some Modern Business Problems. Free Port, New York: Books for Libraries Press Inc. pp. 301-336 – via Internet Archive.
- Plant, Arnold (May 1939). "An African Survey". Economica. New Series. 6 (22): 205–212. doi:10.2307/2548933. JSTOR 2548933.
- Plant, Arnold (1974). Selected Economic Essays and Addresses. London and Boston: Routledge & Kegan Paul [for the Institute of Economic Affairs]. ISBN 0710079354.
