= Coase theorem =

Theorem in economics

The Coase theorem (/ˈkoʊs/) postulates the economic efficiency of an economic allocation or outcome in the presence of externalities. The theorem is significant because, if true, it would be possible for private individuals to make choices that can solve the problem of market externalities. The theorem states that if the provision of a good or service results in an externality and trade in that good or service is possible, then bargaining will lead to a Pareto efficient outcome regardless of the initial allocation of property. A key condition for this outcome is that there are sufficiently low transaction costs in the bargaining and exchange process. This 'theorem' is commonly attributed to Nobel Prize laureate Ronald Coase.

In practice, numerous complications, including imperfect information and poorly defined property rights, can prevent this optimal Coasean bargaining solution. In his 1960 paper, Coase specified the ideal conditions under which the theorem could hold and then also argued that real-world transaction costs are rarely low enough to allow for efficient bargaining. Hence, the theorem is almost always inapplicable to economic reality but is a useful tool in predicting possible economic outcomes.

The Coase theorem is considered an important basis for most modern economic analyses of government regulation, especially in the case of externalities, and it has been used by jurists and legal scholars to analyze and resolve legal disputes. George Stigler summarized the resolution of the externality problem in the absence of transaction costs in a 1966 economics textbook in terms of private and social cost, and for the first time called it a "theorem". Since the 1960s, a voluminous amount of literature on the Coase theorem and its various interpretations, proofs, and criticism has developed and continues to grow.

== The theorem ==
Coase developed his theorem when considering the regulation of radio frequencies. Competing radio stations could use the same frequencies and would therefore interfere with each other's broadcasts. The problem faced by regulators was how to eliminate interference and allocate frequencies to radio stations efficiently. What Coase proposed in 1959 was that as long as property rights in these frequencies were well defined, it ultimately did not matter if adjacent radio stations interfered with each other by broadcasting in the same frequency band. Furthermore, it did not matter to whom the property rights were granted. His reasoning was that the station able to reap the higher economic gain from broadcasting would have an incentive to pay the other station not to interfere.

In the absence of transaction costs, both stations would strike a mutually advantageous deal. It would not matter which station had the initial right to broadcast; eventually, the right to broadcast would end up with the party that was able to put it to the most highly valued use. Of course, the parties themselves would care who was granted the rights initially because this allocation would impact their wealth, but the result of who broadcasts would not change because the parties would trade to the outcome that was overall most efficient. This counterintuitive insight—that the initial imposition of legal entitlement is irrelevant because the parties will eventually reach the same result—is Coase's invariance thesis.

Coase's main point, clarified in his article "The Problem of Social Cost", published in 1960 and cited when he was awarded the Nobel Prize in 1991, was that transaction costs, however, could not be neglected, and therefore, the initial allocation of property rights often mattered. As a result, one normative conclusion sometimes drawn from the Coase theorem is that liability should initially be assigned to the actors for whom the costs of avoiding the externality problem are the lowest. The problem in practice is that the most valued use of a resource is rarely known ex ante, and that the reallocation of resources by government itself entails costs. Another, more refined, normative conclusion also often discussed in law and economics is that government should create institutions that minimize transaction costs, so as to allow misallocations of resources to be corrected as cheaply as possible.

1. In the case of zero transaction costs, no matter how the rights are initially allocated, negotiations between the parties will lead to the Pareto optimal allocation of resources;
2. In the case of non-zero transaction costs, different rights allocation definitions will lead to different resource allocations;
3. Because of the existence of transaction costs, different rights definitions and allocations will bring about resource allocation with different benefits. Therefore, the establishment of the property rights system is the basis for optimizing resource allocation (to Pareto optimal).

When faced with an externality, the same efficient outcome can be reached without any government intervention as long as the following assumptions hold:

1. Property rights must be clearly defined.
2. There must be little to no transactions costs.
3. (Following 2.) There must be few affected parties (or else the transactions costs of organizing them gets to be too great).
4. There must be no wealth effects. The efficient solution will be the same, regardless of who gets the initial property rights.

The Coase theorem shows that the essence of the market is not price, but property rights. As long as there are property rights, people will naturally "negotiate" a reasonable price.

While the mainstream interpretation of the Coase Theorem has long been foundational to law and economics, it is not without its significant challenges and internal contradictions. A provocative recent law review article builds on these tensions, arguing that the theorem remains profoundly misunderstood. The author contends that in "The Problem of Social Cost", Coase actually envisioned a comprehensive state-owned macroeconomic framework. In this model, the state controls all factors of production and private property is abolished, allowing the nation to be managed as a single integrated 'firm' through a strategic blend of market mechanisms, firm structures, and administrative action.

== Efficiency and invariance ==
Because Ronald Coase did not originally intend to set forth any one particular theorem, it has largely been the effort of others who have developed the loose formulation of the Coase theorem. What Coase initially provided was fuel in the form of "counterintuitive insight" that externalities necessarily involved more than a single party engaged in conflicting activities and must be treated as a reciprocal problem. His work explored the relationship between the parties and their conflicting activities and the role of assigned rights/liabilities. While the exact definition of the Coase theorem remains unsettled, there are two issues or claims within the theorem: the results will be efficient and the results in terms of resource allocation will be the same regardless of initial assignments of rights/liabilities.

=== Efficiency version: aside from transaction costs, the prevailing outcome will be efficient ===
The zero transaction cost condition is taken to mean that there are no impediments to bargaining. Since any inefficient allocation leaves unexploited contractual opportunities, the allocation cannot be a contractual equilibrium.

=== Invariance version: aside from transaction costs, the same efficient outcome will prevail ===
This version fits the legal cases cited by Coase. If it is more efficient to prevent cattle trampling a farmer's fields by fencing in the farm, rather than fencing in the cattle, the outcome of bargaining will be the fence around the farmer's fields, regardless of whether victim rights or unrestricted grazing-rights prevail. Subsequent authors have shown that this version of the theorem is not generally true, however. Changing liability placement changes wealth distribution, which in turn affects demand and prices.

== Equivalence version ==
In his UCLA dissertation and in subsequent work, Steven N. S. Cheung (1969) coined an extension of the Coase theorem: aside from transaction costs, all institutional forms are capable of achieving the same efficient allocation. Contracts, extended markets, and corrective taxation are equally capable of internalizing an externality. To be logically correct, some restrictive assumptions are needed. First, spillover effects must be bilateral. This applies to the cases that Coase investigated. Cattle trample a farmer's fields; a building blocks sunlight to a neighbor's swimming pool; a confectioner disturbs a dentist's patients etc. In each case the source of the externality is matched with a particular victim. It does not apply to pollution generally, since there are typically multiple victims. Equivalence also requires that each institution has equivalent property rights. Victim rights in contract law correspond to victim entitlements in extended markets and to the polluter pays principle in taxation.

Notwithstanding these restrictive assumptions, the equivalence version helps to underscore the Pigouvian fallacies that motivated Coase. Pigouvian taxation is revealed as not the only way to internalize an externality. Market and contractual institutions should also be considered, as well as corrective subsidies. The equivalence theorem also is a springboard for Coase's primary achievement—providing the pillars for the New institutional economics. First, the Coasean maximum-value solution becomes a benchmark by which institutions can be compared. And the institutional equivalence result establishes the motive for comparative institutional analysis and suggests the means by which institutions can be compared (according to their respective abilities to economize on transaction costs). The equivalency result also underlies Coase's (1937) proposition that the boundaries of the firm are chosen to minimize transaction costs. Aside from the "marketing costs" of using outside suppliers and the agency costs of central direction inside the firm, whether to put Fisher Body inside or outside of General Motors would have been a matter of indifference.

== Application in United States contract and tort law ==
The Coase theorem has been used by jurists and legal scholars in the analysis and resolution of disputes involving both contract law and tort law.

In contract law, the Coase theorem is often used as a method to evaluate the relative power of the parties during the negotiation and acceptance of a traditional or classical bargained-for contract.

In modern tort law, application of economic analysis to assign liability for damages was popularized by Judge Learned Hand of the Second Circuit Court of Appeals in his decision, United States v. Carroll Towing Co. 159 F.2d 169 (2d. Cir. 1947). Judge Hand held that liability could be determined by applying the formula of $B < PL$, where $B$ is the burden (economic or otherwise) of adequate protection against foreseeable damages, $P$ is the probability of damage (or loss) occurring and $L$ is the gravity of the resulting injury (loss). If the cost of the burden is determined to be less than the cost of the combined probability and loss, it would be unreasonable to not undertake that burden, and not undertaking that burden would be a breach of the standard of care. This decision established economic analysis as a significant approach in tort cases, owing in large part to Judge Hand's reputation among legal scholars.

Subsequent scholarship applying economic models, prominently including the Coase theorem, showed that when transaction costs are minimized or nonexistent, the legal appropriation of liability becomes irrelevant over time. In other words, parties will bargain toward an economically efficient solution regardless of the legal framework in place.

== Examples ==
=== Damage from water runoff ===
Two property owners own land on a mountainside. Property Owner A's land is upstream from Owner B and there is significant, damaging runoff from Owner A's land to Owner B's land. Four scenarios are considered:

1. If a cause of action exists (i.e. B could sue A for damages and win) and the property damage equals $100 while the cost of building a wall to stop the runoff equals $50, the wall will probably exist. Owner A will spend $50 to build the wall in order to prevent a court case where B could claim $100 in damages.
2. If a cause of action exists and the damage equals $50 while the cost of a wall is $100, the wall will not exist. Owner B may sue, win the case and the court will order Owner A to pay B $50. This is cheaper than actually building the wall. Courts rarely order persons to do or not do actions: they prefer monetary awards.
3. If a cause of action does not exist, and the damage equals $100 while the cost of the wall equals $50, the wall will exist. Even though B cannot win the lawsuit, he or she will pay A $50 to build the wall because the wall is less costly than the damages from the runoff.
4. If a cause of action does not exist, and the damage equals $50 while the wall will cost $100, the wall will not exist. B cannot win the lawsuit and the economic realities of trying to get the wall built are prohibitive.

The Coase theorem considers all four of these outcomes logical because the economic incentives will be stronger than legal incentives. Pure or traditional legal analysis will expect that the wall will exist in both scenarios where B has a cause of action and that the wall will never exist if B has no cause of action.

1. A court of law orders owner A to limit its operations.
2. A court of law orders owner A to compensate Owner B.
3. A court of law pays Owner A the gains it makes from causing the runoff.
4. A court of law compensates Owner B the losses it makes from bearing the runoff.
5. Owner A pays Owner B the losses it makes from bearing the runoff.
6. Owner B pays Owner A the gains it makes from causing the runoff.

=== Planting pear trees ===
The Jones family plants pear trees on their property which is adjacent to the Smith family. The Smith family gets an external benefit from the Jones family's pear trees because they pick up whatever pears fall to the ground on their side of the property line. This is an externality because the Smith family does not pay the Jones family for utility received from gathering the fallen pears and, therefore, does not participate in the market transaction of pear production. It results in the pears being underproduced, which means too few pear trees are planted.

We assume the following:

		Marginal Benefit		
		Jones family's demand	Smith family's demand	Societal demand
Number of pear trees	1	$35	$20	$55
Number of pear trees	2	$30	$15	$45
Number of pear trees	3	$25	$10	$35
Number of pear trees	4	$20	$5	$25
Number of pear trees	5	$15	$0	$15
Number of pear trees	6	$10		$10
Number of pear trees	7	$5		$5
Number of pear trees	8	$0		$0

Possible solutions to internalize the externality:

By applying the Coase theorem two possible solutions arise for internalizing this externality. These solutions can occur because the positive external benefits are clearly identified and we assume that 1) transaction costs are low; 2) property rights are clearly defined.

After realizing that the Smith family gets utility from the Jones family's pear trees, the Jones family thinks it is unfair that the Smiths get utility from picking up the pears that fall from their pear trees. The first option to eliminate the externality could be to put up a net fence that will prevent pears from falling to the ground of the Smith's side property line, which will automatically decrease the Smith family's marginal benefit to 0.

The second option for the Jones could be to impose a cost on the Smith family if they want to continue to get utility from their pear trees. Say, if the Jones family has a MC of $25 for each pear tree produced, it allows them to plant 3 pear trees a year (Jones' MB = MC). However, if the cost is imposed on the Smiths, the optimal quantity of pear trees produced a year will increase to 4 (Jones' MB + Smiths' MB = MC). By internalizing the externality, both the Smith family and the Jones family increase their overall utility by increasing production from 3 pear trees a year to 4. $5 is the maximum price the Smiths are willing to pay for an additional, fourth, pear tree, which implies their marginal benefit to plant a fifth pear tree is 0.

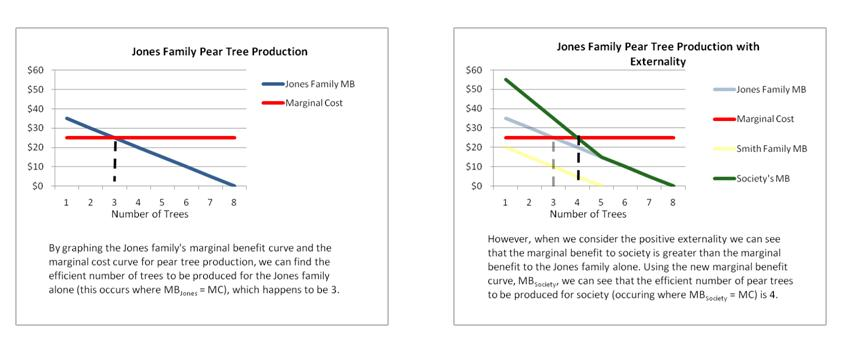
By graphing the Jones family's marginal benefit curve and the marginal cost curve for pear tree production, we can find the efficient number of trees to be produced for the Jones family alone (this occurs when MB_{Jones} = MC), which happens to be 3. However, when we consider the positive externality we can see that the marginal benefit to society is greater than the marginal benefit to the Jones family alone. Using the new marginal benefit curve, MB_{society}, we can see that the efficient number of pear trees to be produced for society (occurring where MB_{society} = MC) is 4.

=== Waterworks Denmark example ===
Whilst the Coase theorem remains largely theoretical, a real life example of Coasean bargaining in the negotiations between waterworks and farmers in Denmark was published in 2012. Danish waterworks attempted to establish "voluntary cultivation agreements with Danish farmers". Some main takeaways from this application of the Coase theorem were that the farmers tried to receive over compensation by exploiting their information advantage, which in turn may have resulted in the waterworks terminating negotiations. Additionally, as asymmetric information is included in transaction costs, by exploiting their information advantage, the farmers prolonged negotiations, thus demonstrating that the Coase theorem is very sensitive to its assumption of low transaction costs.

== Criticism ==
=== Criticisms of the theorem ===
In his later writings, Coase himself expressed frustration that his theorem was often misunderstood. Some mistakenly understood the theorem to mean that markets would always achieve efficient results when transaction costs were low, when in reality his point was almost the exact opposite: because transaction costs are never zero, it cannot be assumed that any institutional arrangement will necessarily be efficient. Others have argued that because transaction costs are never zero it is always appropriate for a government to intervene and regulate, though Coase believed that economists and politicians "tended to over-estimate the advantages which come from governmental regulation". What Coase actually argued is that it is important to always compare alternative institutional arrangements to see which would come closest to "the unattainable ideal of the world of zero transaction costs".

While most critics find fault with the applicability of the Coase theorem, a critique of the theorem itself can be found in the 1981 work of the critical legal scholar Duncan Kennedy, who argues that the initial allocation always matters in reality. This is because psychological studies indicate that asking prices often exceed offer prices, due to the so-called endowment effect. Essentially, a person who already has an entitlement is likely to request more to give it up than would a person who started off without the entitlement. The validity of this theoretical critique in practice is addressed in a later section.

An additional critique of the theorem comes from new institutional economist Steven N. S. Cheung who thinks that private property rights are institutions that arise to reduce transaction costs. The existence of private property rights implies that transaction costs are non-zero. If transaction costs are really zero, any property rights system will result in identical and efficient resource allocation, and the assumption of private property rights is not necessary. Therefore, zero transaction costs and private property rights cannot logically coexist.

Lastly, using a game-theoretic model, it has been argued that sometimes it is easier to reach an agreement if the initial property rights are unclear.

=== Criticisms of the applicability of the theorem ===
==== Transaction costs ====
Ronald Coase's work itself emphasized a problem in applying the Coase theorem: transactions are "often extremely costly, sufficiently costly at any rate to prevent many transactions that would be carried out in a world in which the pricing system worked without cost." This is not a criticism of the theorem itself, since the theorem considers only those situations in which there are no transaction costs. Instead, it is an objection to applications of the theorem that neglect this crucial assumption.

So, a key criticism is that the theorem is almost always inapplicable in economic reality, because real-world transaction costs are rarely low enough to allow for efficient bargaining. (That was the conclusion of Coase's original paper, making him the first 'critic' of using the theorem as a practical solution.) Neo-Keynesian economist James Meade argued that even in a simple case of a beekeeper's bees pollinating a nearby farmer's crops, Coasean bargaining is inefficient (though beekeepers and farmers do make contracts and have for some time).

Chicago school economist David D. Friedman has argued that the fact that an "economist as distinguished as Meade assumed an externality problem was insoluble save for government intervention suggests ... the range of problems to which the Coasean solution is relevant may be greater than many would at first guess."

In many cases of externalities, the parties might be a single large factory versus a thousand landowners nearby. In such situations, say the critics, the transaction costs rise extraordinarily high due to the fundamental difficulties in bargaining with a large number of individuals.

However, transaction costs are not only a barrier for situations with large numbers of involved parties. Even in the simplest of situations, with only two individuals, social costs can increase transaction costs to be unreasonably high so as to invalidate the applicability of Coasean bargaining. As economist Jonathan Gruber described in 2016, there are strong social norms that often prevent people from bargaining in most day-to-day situations. Whether it is the awkwardness of the exchange or the fear of greatly under-valuing someone else's property rights, transaction costs can still be quite high even in the most basic interactions that could make use of the Coase theorem.

==== Assignment problem ====
Gruber described three additional issues with attempting to apply the Coase theorem to real-world situations. The first is known as the assignment problem, and stems from the fact that for most situations with externalities, it is difficult to determine who may be responsible for the externality as well as who is actually affected by it. In the case of a polluted river that reduces the fish population as described by Coase, how can the involved parties determine which factories may have contributed the pollution that specifically harmed the fish, or whether there were any natural factors that interfered in the process? And even if one can determine who exactly is responsible and who is harmed, it is cumbersome to accurately quantify these effects. People cannot easily translate their experiences to monetary values, and they are likely to overstate the harm they have suffered. At the same time, the polluters would likely underestimate the proportion of the externality that they are responsible for.

==== Game-theoretic critique: hold-out, free-rider problems, complete information assumption ====
Second, in situations where multiple parties hold the property rights, Coasean bargaining often fails because of the holdout problem. Once all the property owners except for one have accepted the Coasean solution, the last party is able to demand more compensation from the opposing party in order to part with the property right. Knowing this, the other property owners have the incentive to also demand more, leading to the unraveling of the bargaining process.

Lastly, if the side with only one party holds the property rights (so as to avoid the holdout problem), Coasean bargaining still fails, because of the free-rider problem. When the multiple parties on the other side all benefit fairly equally from the results of the negotiations, then each of the parties has the incentive to free-ride, to withhold their payments and withdraw from the negotiations because they can still receive the benefits regardless of whether or not they contribute financially. In 2016, Ellingsen and Paltseva modelled contract negotiation games and showed that the only way to avoid the free-rider problem in situations with multiple parties is to enforce mandatory participation such as through the use of court orders.

In 2009, in their seminal JEI article, Hahnel and Sheeran highlight several major misinterpretations and common assumptions, which when accounted for substantially reduce the applicability of Coase's theorem to real world policy and economic problems. First, they recognize that the solution between a single polluter and single victim is a negotiation—not a market. As such, it is subject to the extensive work on bargaining games, negotiation, and game theory (specifically a "divide the pie" game under incomplete information). This typically yields a broad range of potential negotiated solutions, making it unlikely that the efficient outcome will be the one selected. Rather it is more likely to be determined by a host of factors including the structure of the negotiations, discount rates and other factors of relative bargaining strength (cf. Ariel Rubinstein).

If the negotiation is not a single shot game, then reputation effects may also occur, which can dramatically distort outcomes and may lead to failed negotiation (cf. David M. Kreps, also the chainstore paradox). Second, the information assumptions required to apply Coase's theorem correctly to yield an efficient result are complete information—in other words that both sides lack private information, that their true costs are completely known, not only to themselves but to each other, and that this knowledge state is also common knowledge. When this is not the case, Coasean solutions predictably yield highly inefficient results because of perverse incentives—not "mere" transaction costs.

If the polluter has the ownership rights, it is incentivized to overstate its benefits from polluting, if the victim has the ownership rights, (s)he has the incentive to also misrepresent her/his damages. As a result, under incomplete information (probably the only state of knowledge for most real world negotiations), Coasean bargaining yields predictably inefficient results.

Hahnel and Sheeran emphasize that these failures are not due to behavioral issues or irrationality (although these are quite prevalent (ultimatum game, cognitive biases)), are not due to transaction costs (although these are also quite prevalent), and are not due to absorbing states and inability to pay. Rather, they are due to fundamental theoretical requirements of Coase's theorem (necessary conditions) that are typically grossly misunderstood, and that when not present systematically eliminate the ability of Coaseian approaches to obtain efficient outcomes—locking in inefficient ones. Hahnel and Sheeran conclude that it is highly unlikely that conditions required for an efficient Coaseian solution will exist in any real-world economic situations.

Unconstrained Coasean bargaining ex post may also lead to a hold-up problem ex ante. Thus, even though it is often claimed that Coasean bargaining is an alternative to Pigouvian taxation (a tax on negative externalities), it has been argued that in a hold-up situation Coasean bargaining may actually justify a Pigouvian tax. Alternatively, it may be efficient to forbid renegotiation. Yet, there are situations in which a ban on contract renegotiation is not desirable.

=== Behavioral criticisms of the Coase theorem ===
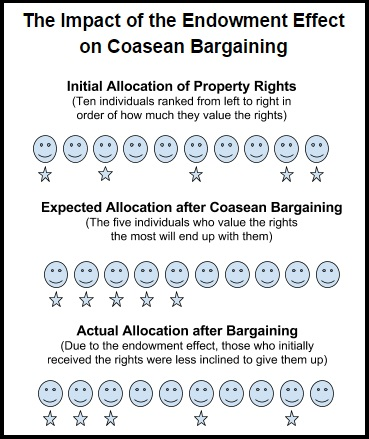
Illustration of the effect of initial allocation on final distribution. The Coase theorem fails to take account of the fact that those who have rights are disinclined to give them up.

Unlike Hahnel and Sheeran, the economist Richard Thaler highlights the importance of behavioral economics in explaining the inability to effectively use the Coase theorem in practice. Thaler modified his experiments with the ultimatum game and showed that people were more likely to be concerned with ensuring fairness in negotiations when negotiating over their own tangible property rather than in an abstract sense. This suggests that in practice, people would not be willing to accept the efficient outcomes prescribed by the Coasean bargaining if they deem them to be unfair. So, while the Coase theorem suggests that parties who lose out on property rights should then pursue the property according to how much they value it, this does not often happen in reality. For example, Professor Ward Farnsworth has described how in the aftermath of twenty observed legal nuisance cases, none of the parties ever attempted to engage in Coasean bargaining (as would be expected to reach the most efficient outcome) because of anger at the unfairness of having to bargain. It is possible that Coase and his defenders would simply view this as a non-pecuniary transaction cost, but that may be an unreasonable extension of the concept of transaction costs.

Thaler has also provided experimental evidence for the argument that initial allocations matter, put forth by Duncan Kennedy (as previously noted), among others. When students were trading cash-equivalent tokens, the negotiations resulted in the students who would receive the most cash from a token (as told by the researchers) holding the tokens, as would be predicted by the Coase theorem. However, when the students were trading property (mugs in this case) that was not directly equivalent to cash, proper Coasean bargaining did not occur as depicted in the adjacent diagram. This is because people generally exhibit an endowment effect, in which they value something more once they actually have possession of it. Thus, the Coase theorem would not always work in practice because initial allocations of property rights would affect the result of the negotiations.

=== Coasean bargaining in the presence of Pigouvian taxation ===
Ian A. MacKenzie and Markus Ohndorf have conducted research on Coasean bargaining in the presence of a Pigouvian tax. This research stems from the common belief within Coasean perspectives that Pigouvian taxation creates distortions and therefore inefficiencies, instead of effectively resolving the problem in question. The research conducted shows that in the presence of a pre-existing Pigouvian tax, Coasean bargaining may be superior. The implications of this policy are regulation at both the federal and state level and environmental litigation and liability. This is because dual regulatory environments exist.

In order to examine whether the hypothesis that Coasean bargaining in the presence of a Pigouvian tax is superior to a scenario without taxation, MacKenzie and Ohndorf had to make certain assumptions. Firstly, they relaxed the assumption of property right allocations, and in doing so had a new take on the Buchanan–Stubblebine–Turvey theorem. By relaxing this assumption, they are able to conclude that even with a Pigouvian tax levied, efficiency improvements can exist. By creating a more realistic environment with how property rights are allocated, MacKenzie and Ohndorf observed that gains from Coasean exchange are reduced by a Pigouvian tax. Furthermore, their research also shows that it is possible that a pre-existing tax can be efficiency-enhancing in the case of environmental litigation and liability. This is because it softens the controversy and therefore, reduces overall spending in litigation.

Therefore, in summary, MacKenzie and Ohndorf's research provides an economic argument in support of Pigouvian taxation in the case where there is the potential for negotiation.

== See also ==
- Pigovian tax
- Fundamental theorems of welfare economics
- Economics
- Economic efficiency
- Market failure
- Externalities
- Environmental economics
