= Aaron Director =

American economist (1901–2004)

- Born: September 21, 1901; Staryi Chortoryisk, Volhynian Governorate, Russian Empire
- Died: September 11, 2004 (aged 102); Los Altos Hills, California, U.S.

Academic background
- Education: Yale University (BA)
- Influences: Frank Knight

Academic work
- Discipline: Law and Economics
- School or tradition: Chicago school of economics
- Institutions: University of Chicago; Hoover Institution, Stanford University

Aaron Director (/dɪˈrɛktər/; September 21, 1901 – September 11, 2004) was a Russian-born American economist and academic who played a central role in the development of law and economics and the Chicago school of economics. Director was a professor at the University of Chicago Law School, and, together with his brother-in-law, Nobel laureate Milton Friedman, influenced a number of jurists, including Robert Bork, Richard Posner, Antonin Scalia, and Chief Justice William Rehnquist.

== Early life and education ==
Director was born to a Jewish family in Staryi Chortoryisk, Volhynian Governorate, Russian Empire (now in Ukraine) on September 21, 1901. In 1913, the 12-year-old Director and his family immigrated to the United States and settled in Portland, Oregon. In Portland, Director attended Lincoln High School, where he edited the yearbook. Director had a difficult childhood in Portland, which, at the time, was a center of anti-communist hysteria and KKK activity in the wake of World War I. He encountered anti-Semitic slurs and was excluded from social circles.

Director attended Yale University, which his friend, artist Mark Rothko, also attended. He graduated in 1924 with a Bachelor of Arts degree, after three years of study. Whilst at Yale, Director was influenced by Thorstein Veblen and H.L. Mencken, both academics who believed the public lacked the necessary intelligence to make democracy successful; he eventually came to hold these views as well. He and Rothko anonymously published a satirical newspaper called the Saturday Evening Pest in which he wrote "the definition of the United States shall eternally be H.L. Mencken surrounded by 112,000,000 morons" and called for an "aristocracy of the mentally alert and curious". In 1926, he returned to Portland where he was hired to run and teach at the Portland Labor College. As a radical, his invitations to events organised by Communists and Wobblies created friction with the AFL-affiliated craft unions, which sponsored the college. While working with these radical groups, Director developed his opinion of individuals as better equipped than government to affect social change. In the fall of 1927, he began graduate study at the University of Chicago on a fellowship, where he combined his radicalism with a lifelong belief in classical liberalism. His sister, the economist Rose Director Friedman, married Milton Friedman in 1938. During World War II, he held positions in the War Department and the Department of Commerce.

== Academic career ==
The Austrian economist and Nobel laureate Friedrich Hayek, at the time a professor of economics at the London School of Economics, was close to Director. They met in England, and Director convinced the University of Chicago Press to publish Hayek's The Road to Serfdom in the United States as part of the so-called Free Market Study, which they and economist Henry Simons led. Hayek actively promoted Director in helping to fund and establish the Law and Society program in the Law School. Hayek convinced Missouri businessman Harold Luhnow, head of the Volker Fund, a foundation in Kansas City, to provide the funding. Luhnow also funded Director's University of Chicago salary for five years, a rare occurrence for the university.

The Free Market Study had at first centered on Simons's traditional conservatism and opposition to monopolies, but his death in 1946 opened the door for a more radical conservatism. In 1950, Director still sympathised with Simons's economic philosophy, and as a result, Luhnow threatened to remove him from the Free Market Study. During this period of the 1940s and 1950s, Director broke away from traditional conservative politics, instead combining it with the social skepticism he had learned from Veblen and Mencken and the elitism he developed in Portland.

Director's appointment to the faculty of the University of Chicago Law School in 1946 began a half-century of intellectual productivity, although his reluctance about publishing left few writings behind. Director taught antitrust courses at the law school with Edward Levi, who was later Dean of Chicago's Law School, President of the University of Chicago, and U.S. Attorney General in the Ford administration.

In 1953, Director became the head of a new study called the Antitrust Project which aimed to restructure American antitrust law. The project coincided with the period in which Director broke from traditional conservative ideas and fused them with the elitism of Veblen and Mencken. He argued that private monopolies only emerged as a result of government action, without which, they would cease to be a problem. This shift helped turn the focus of the Chicago school of economics towards rebuilding corporate power.

Director used a two-part strategy to help build up the Chicago school. First, he recruited scholars as well as funding for their research. Second, he had them use Mencken's framework of mocking targets as ignorant and elitist. Two of the first converts to Director's neoliberal school were Friedman and George Stigler, scholars from the older, classically liberal Chicago conservative tradition. Friedman and Stigler were still anti-monopolist, but over the course of the 1950s, Director convinced them that monopolies would cease to be a problem under the neoliberal framework. From then on, Director served as the "ideological enforcer" of the new Chicago school with Friedman crafting the rhetoric and Stigler driving the economic vision. Through Director's Chicago school framework, scholars like Friedman and Stigler made their first advances into public-policy advocacy

Director's greatest contribution to the Chicago school lay in his ability to recruit and convert scholars to the school's neoliberal doctrine. Some of his students compared taking his antitrust or economics courses to a religious conversion with Nobel laureate Ronald Coase joking that "I regarded my role as that of Saint Paul to Aaron Director's Christ. He got the doctrine going, and what I had to do was bring it to the gentiles." Rather than penning the great works of the Chicago school himself, he was, according to former University of Chicago Law School dean Douglas Baird "a teacher of teachers."

Director founded the Journal of Law & Economics in 1958, which he co-edited with Coase, that helped to unite the fields of law and economics with far-reaching influence. In 1962, he helped to found the Committee on a Free Society. Behind the law and economics movement lay the narrative of scientific consensus. The Chicago school was not the first group to show interest in empirical economics but they used the language of science as a strong rhetorical tool. Director viewed human nature deterministically so he argued that the law could be replaced by the scientific principles of economics through efficiency measurements.

The work of Director and his students fundamentally altered public discourse around issues of economics. In 1954, President Dwight D. Eisenhower said of those who opposed the reforms of the New Deal "their number is negligible and they are stupid" The reason he gave was: "Should any political party attempt to abolish social security, unemployment insurance, and eliminate labor laws and farm programs, you would not hear of that party again in our political history." By 1964, Director students including Robert Bork were working on Barry Goldwater's presidential campaign. At that time, the Chicago school was not yet the dominant force in political discourse, but in ten years, it had gone from being "negligible" to being a significant opposition to the majority. In 1973, Bork was appointed as Solicitor General of the United States by President Richard Nixon. Meanwhile, the Supreme Court had begun striking down antitrust legal precedents. In just two decades, Director and his students had brought the Chicago school from obscurity to a major intellectual force in American politics.

After retiring from the University of Chicago Law School in 1965, Director relocated to California and took a position at Stanford University's Hoover Institution. He died September 11, 2004, at his home in Los Altos Hills, California, ten days shy of his 103rd birthday.

== See also ==
- Director's law
