= Director's law =

Economic theory

Director's law states that the bulk of public programs are designed primarily to benefit the middle classes, but are financed by taxes paid primarily by the upper and lower classes. The empirically derived law was first proposed by economist Aaron Director.

The philosophy of Director's law is that, based on the size of its population and its aggregate wealth, the middle class will always be the dominant interest group in a modern democracy. As such, it will use its influence to maximize the state benefits it receives and minimize the portion of costs it bears.

The logic for the law is developed as follows:

- In theory, one would imagine that the most likely voting bloc would arise from the bottom 51 percent of society aligning to accrue benefits at the expense of the top 49 percent
- However, the conditions that may cause people to be in the lower income stratas are the same conditions that prevent them from organizing effectively as a cohesive unit
- Furthermore, the highest-income voters are also excluded because the value of taxing them more outweighs the contribution of their votes
- In the absence of the lowest income voters, the middle 51 percent align to push legislation that benefit themselves at the expense of the lowest and highest strata of earners

In addition, the law can explain the range of public perception of various government programs:

- Direct welfare payments, disproportionately received by the poor, are generally maligned
- Support of state colleges / universities and education debt forgiveness, which disproportionately affect the middle class, are very well regarded politically

The law bears some resemblance to Chinese Communist theory, which stipulates similarly that Communist revolution cannot come from the uneducated proletariat (as originally stipulated by Marx et al.) for similar reasons, but instead must be ushered in by the educated classes.

Milton Friedman used Director's law in his lectures to argue against the notion that governments benefited the poor at the expense of the rich.
