= The Nature of the Firm =

1937 scholarly article by Ronald Coase

"The Nature of the Firm" (1937) is an article by Ronald Coase published in the economics journal Economica. It offered an economic explanation of why individuals choose to form partnerships, companies, and other business entities rather than trading bilaterally through contracts on a market. The author was awarded the Nobel Memorial Prize in Economic Sciences in 1991 in part due to this paper. Despite the honor, the paper was written when Coase was an undergraduate and he described it later in life as "little more than an undergraduate essay."

The article argues that firms emerge because they are better equipped to deal with the transaction costs inherent in production and exchange than individuals are. Economists such as Oliver Williamson, Douglass North, Oliver Hart, Bengt Holmström, Armen Alchian and Harold Demsetz expanded on Coase's work on firms, transaction costs and contracts. Economists and political scientists have used insights from Coase's work to explain the functioning of organizations in general, not just firms. Coase's work strongly influenced the New Economics of Organization (New Institutional Economics).

Coase's article distinguished between markets as a coordination mechanism and firms as a coordination mechanism.

== Summary ==
Given that production could be carried on without any organization, Coase asks, 'Why and under what conditions should we expect firms to emerge?' Since modern firms can only emerge when an entrepreneur of some sort begins to hire people, Coase's analysis proceeds by considering the conditions under which it makes sense for an entrepreneur to seek hired help instead of contracting out for some particular task.

The traditional economic theory of the time suggested that, because the market is "efficient" (that is, those who are best at providing each good or service most cheaply are already doing so), it should always be cheaper to contract out than to hire.

Coase noted, however, that there are a number of transaction costs to using the market; the cost of obtaining a good or service via the market is actually more than just the price of the good. Other costs, including search and information costs, bargaining costs, keeping trade secrets, and policing and enforcement costs, can all potentially add to the cost of procuring something via the market. This suggests that firms will arise when they can arrange to produce what they need internally, and somehow avoid these costs.

There is a natural limit to what can be produced internally, however. Coase notices "decreasing returns to the entrepreneur function", including increasing overhead costs and increasing propensity for an overwhelmed manager to make mistakes in resource allocation. This is a countervailing cost to the use of the firm.

Coase argues that the size of a firm (as measured by how many contractual relations are "internal" to the firm and how many "external") is a result of finding an optimal balance between the competing tendencies of the costs outlined above. In general, making the firm larger will initially be advantageous, but the decreasing returns indicated above will eventually kick in, preventing the firm from growing indefinitely.

Other things being equal (ceteris paribus), a firm will tend to be larger:

- the less the costs of organizing and the slower these costs rise with an increase in the transactions organized.
- the less likely the entrepreneur is to make mistakes and the smaller the increase in mistakes with an increase in the transactions organized.
- the greater the lowering (or the less the rise) in the supply price of factors of production to firms of larger size.

The first two costs will increase with the spatial distribution of the transactions organized and the dissimilarity of the transactions. This explains why firms tend to either be in different geographic locations or to perform different functions. Additionally, technology changes that mitigate the cost of organizing transactions across space will cause firms to be larger—the advent of the telephone and cheap air travel, for example, would be expected to increase the size of firms. On a related note the use of the internet and related modern information and communication technologies seem to lead to the existence of so-called virtual organizations.

Coase does not consider non-contractual relationships, as between friends or family.

== Reactions ==
In 1991, Coase was awarded the Sveriges Riksbank (Bank of Sweden) Prize in Economic Sciences in Memory of Alfred Nobel. His paper provided a breakthrough on the significance of transaction costs and property rights for the institutional structure and functioning of the economy.

The paper has had an outsized impact on the field of microeconomics, particularly in essentially inventing the body of research that deals with the theory of the firm. According to Google Scholar, the paper has been cited more than 59,000 times as of September 2024.

This article was famously referred by Yochai Benkler in his article "Coase's Penguin, or, Linux and The Nature of the Firm", where he links Coase's essay to the emergence of commons-based peer production communities using the Internet. In particular, Benkler considers the commons-based peer production a third alternative coordination mechanism for economic transactions besides the dichotomy composed of markets and hierarchies. In the article's title, ‘penguin’ refers to the logo of the Linux operating system, invoking the challenge it poses to Coase's work by working through different mechanisms than those present in markets and firms. Resolving this challenge, according to Benkler, lies in substituting the role of transaction costs in Coase's work with the concept of information opportunity costs when explaining the emergence of commons-based peer production.

The World Bank's 2019 World Development Report on The Changing Nature of Work suggests that firms and production processes become less vertically integrated as technology makes it cheaper to resort to the open market to complete portions of the production process.

== See also ==
- Economic analysis of law
- "The Problem of Social Cost"
- Theory of the firm

== Notes ==
- Coase, Ronald (1937). "The Nature of the Firm". Economica. 4 (16). Blackwell Publishing: 386–405. doi:10.1111/j.1468-0335.1937.tb00002.x. JSTOR 2626876.
