= Law and economics =

Analysis of law using economic theory

Law and economics, or economic analysis of law, is the application of microeconomic theory to the analysis of legal rules and institutions. The field emerged in the United States in the early 1960s, primarily through the work of scholars from the Chicago school of economics, such as Aaron Director, George Stigler, and Ronald Coase, and jurists, including Guido Calabresi. The field uses economics concepts to explain the effects of laws, assess which legal rules are economically efficient, and predict which legal rules will be promulgated. There are two major branches of law and economics. One is based on applying the methods and theories of neoclassical economics to the positive and normative analysis of the law. The second branch focuses on an institutional analysis of law and legal institutions, with a broader focus on economic, political, and social outcomes, and overlapping with analyses of the institutions of politics and governance.

== History ==
=== Origin ===
The historical antecedents of law and economics can be traced back to the classical economists, who are credited with establishing the foundations of modern economic thought. As early as the 18th century, Adam Smith discussed the economic effects of mercantilist legislation; later, David Ricardo opposed the British Corn Laws because they hindered agricultural productivity; and Frédéric Bastiat, in his influential book The Law, examined the unintended consequences of legislation. However, applying economic analysis to the law regulating non-market activities is relatively new. A European law-and-economics movement around 1900 had no lasting influence. In a 1917 article analyzing the study of law and economics in American universities, Eugene Allen Gilmore concluded, "the relation between law and economics seems either not to be perceived, or, if perceived, not to be regarded as a relationship desirable or feasible of very much cultivation." However, writings of John R. Commons and Robert Lee Hale had brought economic thinking to law and legal institutions as early as 1909.

Harold Luhnow, the head of the Volker Fund, financed F. A. Hayek in the United States starting in 1946; he shortly thereafter financed Aaron Director's appointment to a faculty position at the University of Chicago to establish a new center for scholars in law and economics at the institution. The university was headed by Robert Maynard Hutchins, a close collaborator of Luhnow's in establishing the Chicago School, as it came to be known. The university faculty then included a strong base of libertarian scholars, including Frank Knight, George Stigler, Henry Simons, Ronald Coase, and Jacob Viner. Soon, it would also include not just Hayek himself, but Director's brother-in-law and Stigler's friend Milton Friedman, and also Robert Fogel, Robert Lucas, Eugene Fama, Richard Posner, and Gary Becker.

Historians Robert van Horn and Philip Mirowski described the development of modern economic concepts in "The Rise of the Chicago School of Economics", a chapter of The Road from Mont Pelerin (2009); and historian Bruce Caldwell (a great admirer of von Hayek) filled in more details of the account in his chapter, "The Chicago School, Hayek, and Neoliberalism", in Building Chicago Economics (2011). The field began with Gary Becker's 1968 paper on crime (Becker also received a Nobel Prize). In 1972, Richard Posner, a law-and-economics scholar and the leading advocate of the positive theory of efficiency, published the first edition of Economic Analysis of Law and founded The Journal of Legal Studies, both of which are regarded as important events. Gordon Tullock and Friedrich Hayek also wrote intensively in the area and contributed to the spread of law and economics.

=== Founding ===
In 1958, Director founded The Journal of Law & Economics, which he co-edited with Nobel laureate Ronald Coase, helping to unite the fields of law and economics and exerting far-reaching influence. In 1960 and 1961, Ronald Coase and Guido Calabresi independently published two groundbreaking articles, "The Problem of Social Cost" and "Some Thoughts on Risk Distribution and the Law of Torts". This can be seen as the starting point for the modern school of law and economics.

In 1962, Aaron Director helped to found the Committee on a Free Society. Director's appointment to the faculty of the University of Chicago Law School in 1946 marked the beginning of a half-century of intellectual productivity, although his reluctance to publish left few writings behind. He taught antitrust courses at the law school with Edward Levi, who eventually would serve as Dean of Chicago's Law School, President of the University of Chicago, and U.S. Attorney General in the Ford administration. After retiring from the University of Chicago Law School in 1965, Director relocated to California. He took a position at Stanford University's Hoover Institution. He died September 11, 2004, at his home in Los Altos Hills, California, ten days before his 103rd birthday.

=== Later development ===
In the early 1970s, Henry Manne (a former student of Coase) set out to build a center for law and economics at a major law school. Ultimately, Manne established a center at George Mason, thar became a hub for the education of judges, many of whom had never previously been exposed to the concepts of law and economics. Manne also attracted the support of the John M. Olin Foundation; Olin centers (or programs) for Law and Economics now exist at many universities.

== Positive and normative law and economics ==
Economic analysis of law is usually divided into two subfields: positive and normative.

=== Positive law and economics ===
'Positive law and economics' uses economic analysis to predict the effects of various legal rules. So, for example, a positive economic analysis of tort law would predict the effects of a strict liability rule rather than a negligence rule. Positive law and economics have also at times purported to explain the development of legal rules, for example, the common law of torts, in terms of their economic efficiency.

=== Normative law and economics ===
Normative law and economics goes one step further and makes policy recommendations based on the economic consequences of various policies. The key concept in normative economic analysis is efficiency, particularly, allocative efficiency.

A common concept of efficiency used by law and economics scholars is Pareto efficiency. A legal rule is Pareto efficient if it cannot be changed to make one person better off without making another person worse off. A weaker conception of efficiency is Kaldor–Hicks efficiency. A legal rule is Kaldor–Hicks efficient if it could be made Pareto efficient by some parties compensating others to offset their losses.

Nonetheless, the possibility of a clear distinction between positive and normative analysis has been questioned by Guido Calabresi, who, in his book on "The Future of Law and Economics" (2016: 21–22), believes that there is an "actual - and unavoidable - existence of value judgments underlying much economic analysis."

Uri Weiss proposed this alternative: "It is common in law and economics to search for the law that will lead to the optimal outcome, providing the maximum size 'pie,' and to think about maximizing happiness instead of minimizing pain. We prefer another approach: We do not try to identify games that will lead to the optimal result but to prevent games in which it is in the best interests of the players to come to an unjust result".

== Criminal law ==
In 1968, Gary Becker, who would later win the Nobel Prize in Economic Sciences, published Crime and Punishment: An Economic Approach. This work relied on the economic concept of utility as the basic unit of analysis. In 1985, in An Economic Theory of the Criminal Law, Posner set out an alternative approach that relied instead on wealth as the basic unit of analysis.

== Relationship to other disciplines and approaches ==
As used by lawyers and legal scholars, the phrase "law and economics" generally refers to the application of neoclassical ‘microeconomic analysis’ to legal problems. Because of the overlap between legal and political systems, some issues in law and economics also arise in political economy, constitutional economics, and political science.

Approaches to the same issues from Marxist and critical theory/Frankfurt School perspectives usually do not identify themselves as "law and economics". For example, research by members of the critical legal studies movement and the sociology of law considers many of the same fundamental issues as does work labeled "law and economics", though from a vastly different perspective. The law and political economy movement also analyzes similar concepts using an entirely different approach.

The one wing that represents a non-neoclassical approach to "law and economics" is the Continental (mainly German) tradition that sees the concept starting of the governance and public policy (Staatswissenschaften) approach and the German Historical school of economics; this view is represented in the Elgar Companion to Law and Economics (2nd ed. 2005) and—though not exclusively—in the European Journal of Law and Economics. Here, consciously non-neoclassical approaches to economics are used to analyze legal (and administrative/governance) problems.

Law and economics is closely related to jurimetrics, the application of probability and statistics to legal questions.

== Applications ==
- Affirmative action (Coate-Loury model)
- Antitrust law (Herfindahl–Hirschman Index)
- Calculus of negligence
- Congestion pricing
- Corporate governance
- Cost–benefit analysis
  - Criminal law
  - Mass surveillance in the United States
  - Surveillance
- Crime enforcement
- Deregulation (Airlines, communications, energy, surface freight)
- Design of contracts (Contract theory)
  - Efficient breach
- Discrimination
  - Statistical discrimination (economics)
- Drug policy (Iron law of prohibition)
- Evidence
- Evolution of the common law (Evolutionary game theory)
- Financial regulation (Efficient market hypothesis)
  - Fraud-on-the-market theory
- Governance of the commons
  - Tragedy of the commons
- Institutional origins
  - The Colonial Origins of Comparative Development: An Empirical Investigation
  - Constitutional economics
  - Legal origins theory
  - Property rights
- Intellectual property (Economics and patents)
- Natural monopoly regulation (Averch–Johnson effect)
- Peltzman effect
- Principal–agent problem
  - Adverse selection
  - Moral hazard
- Quarantine measures for public health
- Prudent investor rule (Modern portfolio theory)
- Rent control
- Rent-seeking
- Transaction costs (Coase theorem)
- Value of a statistical life
- Voting systems (Social choice theory)
- Water law

== Influence ==
The economic analysis of law has been influential in the United States and elsewhere. Judicial opinions in the United States use economic analysis and the theories of law and economics with some regularity, and increasingly in Commonwealth countries and in Europe. The influence of law and economics has also been felt in legal education, with graduate programs in the subject being offered in some countries. The influence of law and economics in civil law countries may be gauged by the availability of law and economics textbooks in English and other European languages (Schäfer and Ott 2004; Mackaay 2013).

Many law schools in North America, Europe, and Asia have faculty members with a graduate degree in economics. In addition, many professional economists now study and write on the relationship between economics and legal doctrines. Anthony Kronman, former dean of Yale Law School, has written that "the intellectual movement that has had the greatest influence on American academic law in the past quarter-century [of the 20th Century]" is law and economics.

A 2025 study found that the judges who attended an intensive economics course at the Manne Economics Institute for Federal Judges subsequently "use[d] more economics language in their opinions, rule[d] against regulatory agencies more often, and impose[d] more severe criminal sentences." Almost half of all federal judges between 1976 and 1999 were trained in this economics course.

== Criticisms ==
Despite its influence, the law and economics movement has been criticized from several directions. This is especially true of normative law and economics. Because most law and economics scholarship operates within a neoclassical framework, fundamental criticisms of neoclassical economics have been drawn from other, competing frameworks, though there are numerous internal critiques as well. Yet other schools of economic thought have emerged and been applied to in the field of law and economics—for example, the work of Edgardo Buscaglia and Robert Cooter in the book "Law and Economics of Development".

=== Rational choice theory ===
Critics of the economic analysis of legal questions have argued that normative economic analysis fails to capture the importance of human rights and concerns about distributive justice. Some of the heaviest criticisms of law and economics come from the critical legal studies movement, in particular Duncan Kennedy and Mark Kelman. Jon D. Hanson, of Harvard Law School, argues that our legal, economic, political, and social systems are unduly influenced by an individualistic model of behavior based on preferences, rather than one that incorporates cognitive biases and social norms.

=== Pareto efficiency ===
Additional criticism has been directed at the assumed benefits of laws and policies designed to increase allocative efficiency when those assumptions rest on "first-best" (Pareto optimal) general-equilibrium conditions. Under the theory of the second best, for example, if the fulfillment of a subset of optimal conditions cannot be met under any circumstances, it is incorrect to conclude that the fulfillment of any subset of optimal conditions will necessarily increase allocative efficiency.

Consequently, any expression of public policy whose purported purpose is an unambiguous increase in allocative efficiency (for example, consolidation of research and development costs through increased mergers and acquisitions resulting from a systematic relaxation of antitrust laws) is, according to critics, fundamentally incorrect, as there is no general reason to conclude that an increase in allocative efficiency is more likely than a decrease.

Essentially, the "first-best" neoclassical analysis fails to properly account for various kinds of general-equilibrium feedback relationships that result from intrinsic Pareto imperfections.

Another critique is that there is no unique optimal result. Warren Samuels, in his 2007 book, The Legal-Economic Nexus, argues, "efficiency in the Pareto sense cannot dispositively be applied to the definition and assignment of rights themselves, because efficiency requires an antecedent determination of the rights (23–4)".

=== "Internal" analytical criticisms ===
Relatedly, legal scholarship has also criticized the movement for allowing its framing of models to dictate its results, for overemphasizing or underemphasizing specific incentives and costs, and for building models that do not degrade "gracefully" (and therefore have difficulty modeling reality). In other words, the law and economics movement may not achieve "efficiency", even to the extent that allocative efficiency is the goal of the law.

=== Criminal methodology ===
Cullerne Bown has criticized Posner's approach on methodological grounds. He concludes that Posner's approach to evaluating policies in the criminal process is methodologically invalid and that "these failings in turn make the entirety of his conclusions on the criminal process unreliable".

=== Responses to criticism ===
Law and economics has adapted to some of these criticisms and has been developed in a variety of directions. One important trend has been the application of game theory to legal problems. Other developments have been the incorporation of behavioral economics into economic analysis of law, and the increasing use of statistical and econometrics techniques. Within the legal academy, the term socio-economics has been applied to economic approaches that are self-consciously broader than the neoclassical tradition.

Property rights, analyzed through economic analysis, are regarded as fundamental human rights by defenders of law and economics.

== See also ==
- Competition policy
- Contract theory
- Constitutionalism
- Constitutional economics
- Cost–benefit analysis
- Democracy and economic growth
- Economic imperialism (economics)
- Economics
- Iron law of prohibition
- Islamic economical jurisprudence
- Jurimetrics
- Legal origins theory
- Legal theory
- Microeconomics
- New institutional economics
- Occupational licensing
- Political economy
- Property rights (economics)
- Public choice theory
