= The Journal of Law and Economics =

- Discipline: Law and economics
- Language: English
- Edited by: Dennis W. Carlton, Dhammika Dharmapala, John P. Gould, Richard Holden, Anup Malani, Sam Peltzman, Christopher Snyder

Publication details
- History: 1958–present
- Publisher: University of Chicago Press for the University of Chicago Law School (United States)
- Frequency: Quarterly
- Impact factor: 0.29 (2017)

Standard abbreviations
- Bluebook: J.L. & Econ.
- ISO 4: J. Law Econ.

Indexing
- CODEN: JLLEA7
- ISSN: 0022-2186 (print); 1537-5285 (web)
- LCCN: 59001643
- JSTOR: 00222186
- OCLC no.: 473558229

Links
- Journal homepage

The Journal of Law and Economics is an academic journal published by the University of Chicago Press. It publishes articles on the economic analysis of regulation and the behavior of regulated firms, the political economy of legislation and legislative processes, law and finance, corporate finance and governance, and industrial organization. The journal is sponsored by the University of Chicago Law School.

The journal was founded by Aaron Director at the University of Chicago in 1958, and Ronald Coase joined him later as the co-editor. The journal played an important role in the formation of the field Law and Economics.

According to the Journal Citation Reports, the journal has a 2024 impact factor of 1.5.
