= The Problem of Social Cost =

1960 law review article by Ronald Coase

"The Problem of Social Cost" (1960) is a law review article by Ronald Coase, then a faculty member at the University of Virginia, dealing with the economic problem of externalities. It draws from a number of English legal cases and statutes to illustrate Coase's belief that legal rules are only justified by reference to a cost–benefit analysis, and that nuisances that are often regarded as being the fault of one party are more symmetric conflicts between the interests of the two parties. If there are sufficiently low costs of doing a transaction, legal rules would be irrelevant to the maximization of production. Because in the real world there are costs of bargaining and information gathering, legal rules are justified to the extent of their ability to allocate rights to the most efficient right-bearer.

Along with an earlier article, “The Nature of the Firm”, "The Problem of Social Cost" was cited by the Nobel committee when Coase was awarded the Nobel Memorial Prize in Economic Sciences in 1991. The article is foundational to the field of law and economics, and has become the most frequently cited work in all of legal scholarship.

== Summary ==
Coase argued that if we lived in a world without transaction costs, people would bargain with one another to produce the most efficient distribution of resources, regardless of the initial allocation. This is superior to allocation through litigation. Coase used the example of a nuisance case named Sturges v Bridgman, where a noisy sweetmaker and a quiet doctor were neighbours and went to court to see who should have to move. Coase said that regardless of whether the judge ruled that the sweetmaker had to stop using his machinery, or that the doctor had to put up with it, they could strike a mutually beneficial bargain about who moves that reaches the same outcome of productive activity.

However, many welfare-maximizing reallocations are often forgone because of the transaction costs involved in bargaining. For instance, the sweetmaker may have many neighbors who claim "nuisance" — some legitimate and some not, that the firm would have to sort through, and some of those neighbors who do claim nuisance may try to hold out for excessive compensation. In these cases, the transaction costs eat away, and ultimately eclipse, the price signals that would have led to the most efficient distribution of resources.

In cases like these with potentially high transaction costs, the law ought to produce an outcome similar to what would result if the transaction costs were eliminated. However, there is no cost-effective method of determining precisely what that outcome would be, by definition. So Coase argues that the courts should only intervene in cases that cause an unreasonable amount of nuisance after a wide analysis with regard to the total effect of such interventions.

Additionally, Coase highlights reciprocity of harms present in externalities as a central question for distributing rights. Damage is shared between parties in a dispute, such that both parties consider the present costs in their optimization question. Coase uses the ruling of "Bryant v. Lefever" to explore the reciprocal nature of externality. Bryant v. Lefever concerns a conflict between neighbors, in which one neighbor constructed a wall such that the other neighbor's chimney would smoke. Originally, the court determined the wall was the cause of the chimneys smoking and awarded the plaintiff financial compensation. However, in the Court of Appeals, this judgment was reversed. Coase argues that this judgment provides context for framing blame. According to Coase, “The smoke nuisance was caused both by the man who built the wall and by the man who lit the fires”. Under this framework, the wall-builder is not legally liable for the nuisance suffered by his neighbor alone. In this example, Coase seeks to illuminate the conditions for optimizing the allocation of rights, the case in which both parties consider harmful. Here, Coase is referencing Pareto efficiency allowed by the prevailing “pricing system”.

Coase used the example of pollution (raised by George Stigler in The Theory of Price, 1952) several times: he argued that arbitrage between actors in a market with low transaction costs could lead to an efficient market solution.

Coase extends this framework throughout his development of a functional theorem concerning externalities. Coase argues that these rights are integrated into an actor's decision-making process through their unique cost function. These costs are not isolated in nature, according to Coase, who concluded “The cost of exercising a right (of using a factor of production) is always the loss which is suffered elsewhere”

The ultimate thesis is that law and regulation are not as important or effective at helping people as lawyers and government planners believe. Coase and others like him wanted a change of approach, to put the burden of proof for positive effects on a government that was intervening in the market, by analysing the costs of the action.

The argument forms the basis of the Coase Theorem as labeled by George Stigler.

== Theoretical challenges ==
Guido Calabresi in his book The Costs of Accidents (1970) argues that it is still efficient to hold companies liable that produce greater wealth.

In the real world, where people cannot negotiate costlessly, there may be collective action problems of those who caused a nuisance, for instance by smoke emissions from a factory to many neighbouring farms, and so getting together to negotiate effectively can be difficult against a single polluter because of coordination problems. If it is efficient for the farmers to pay the factory to reduce its emissions, some of those farmers may hold off paying their fair share, hoping to get a free ride. The factory may be in a better position to know what measures to take to reduce harm, and can be the cheapest avoider, illustrating Coase's argument.

== Cases and statutes ==
Coase uses three main examples in his article to attempt to illustrate his points. The first is a fictional cattle herder and a farmer, but the second is the case Sturges v Bridgman and the third is the Railway (Fires) Act 1905. Apart from these main examples, the following cases are referred to.

- Fontainebleu Hotel Corp. v. Forty-Five Twenty-Five, Inc., 114 So. 2d 357 (1959)
- Cooke v Forbes (1867–1868) LR 5 Eq 166
- Bryant v Lefever (1878–1879) 4 CPD 172, Bramwell LJ and Cotton LJ
- Bass v Gregory (1890) 25 QBD 481
- Attorney General v Doughty (1752) 28 ER 290
- Versailles Borough v. McKeesport Coal & Coke Co. (1935) 83 Pitts. Leg. J 379, 385
- Webb v Bird (1863) 143 ER 332
- Rushmer v Polsue and Alfieri, Ltd (1906) 1 Ch 234
- Adams v Ursell (1913) 1 Ch 269, regarding fish and chips
- Andreae v Selfridge and Company Ltd (1938) 1 Ch 1
- Delta Air Corporation v. Kersey (1942) 193 Ga. 862
- Thrasher v. City of Atlanta (1934) 178 Ga. 514
- Georgia Railroad and Banking Co. v. Maddox (1902) 116 Ga. 64
- Smith v. New England Aircraft Co. (1930) 270 Mass. 511
- Vaughan v Taff Vale Railway Co. (1858) 3 H and N 743
- Boulston v Hardy (1597) 77 ER 216
- Stearn v Prentice Bros Ltd (1919) 1 KB 395
- Bland v Yates (1913–1914) 58 Sol J 612

== See also ==
- Theory of the firm
