= Shadow Open Market Committee =

Group of monetarist economists

The Shadow Open Market Committee (SOMC) is an American independent group of economists. It was first organized in 1973 by Professors Karl Brunner, from the University of Rochester, and Allan Meltzer, from Carnegie Mellon University. to provide a monetarist alternative to the views on monetary policy and its inflation effects then prevailing at the Federal Reserve and within the economics profession.

At that time, the Federal Reserve argued that rising and variable inflation since 1965 was largely attributable to non-monetary forces such as the power of labor unions and oil price shocks, and had little to do with rapid money growth. Based on the principles of monetarism developed earlier by Milton Friedman, the SOMC blamed the Great Inflation squarely on Federal Reserve policies that featured excessive money growth.

The SOMC's principal message that persistent inflation is always and everywhere a monetary phenomenon has been widely accepted by central bankers and economists. That framework still forms the basis for the SOMC's comments on and criticisms of Federal Reserve policy actions and strategy. Over time, the SOMC has broadened its focus to include issues relating to policies on international trade, exchange rates, and taxes, as well as the regulation of the U.S. banking and financial systems.

The SOMC continues to meet twice per year and maintains a website that includes an archive of the SOMC's position papers, a "Core Beliefs" statement and papers by its members. Since 2009, the SOMC has operated in partnership with E21: Economic Policies for the 21st Century.

== Founding and early history ==
Allan Meltzer has described the circumstances that led him, together with Karl Brunner, to organize the Shadow Open Market Committee, and has also chronicled the SOMC’s early history.

In 1971, President Richard Nixon adopted wage and price controls in an attempt to reverse the acceleration of inflation, which by then had risen above 4 percent. Brunner and Meltzer decided to form a group of "like-minded economists" to argue against the effectiveness of wage and price controls as a tool for ending inflation and in favor of a gradual reduction in money growth as a preferred alternative. Together with William Wolman, Brunner and Meltzer chose the name "Shadow Open Market Committee," as a reference to both the Federal Open Market Committee, the Federal Reserve's monetary policy making arm, and the Shadow Cabinet as the group of ministers chosen from the opposition party within the U.K. Parliamentary system.

The original SOMC featured twelve members, equal to the number of voting members of the Federal Open Market Committee, chosen from academic institutions, financial institutions, and non-financial businesses. Beginning on September 14, 1973, the group met semi-annually in New York City.

John Allan of the New York Times described the first SOMC meeting and policy statement. The Committee urged the Federal Reserve to abandon its efforts to fine tune the economy, and focus instead on reducing the rate of money growth from 6 ½ to 5 ½ percent per year, as an initial step towards working inflation down to more acceptable levels.

In 1988, the SOMC moved its meeting location from New York to Washington, D.C.. Changes in membership gradually occurred, with some former SOMC members leaving to accept high-ranking positions at the Federal Reserve. In that sense, Meltzer noted that the SOMC functioned somewhat like the U.K. Shadow Cabinet, with its members rotating periodically into official policymaking positions.

Original SOMC member Robert Rasche served as Executive Vice President and Policy Advisor at the Federal Reserve Bank of St. Louis from January 1999 until his retirement in June 2011. Beryl Sprinkel, another original SOMC member, became Chairman of the Council of Economic Advisers in 1985. SOMC member Jerry Jordan served as a member of the Council of Economic Advisors in 1981 and 1982 and as President of the Federal Reserve Bank of Cleveland from 1992 through 2003. Lee Hoskins served as President of the Federal Reserve Bank of Cleveland from 1987 through 1991; William Poole as President of the Federal Reserve Bank of St. Louis from 1998 through 2008; and Charles Plosser as President and of the Federal Reserve Bank of Philadelphia from 2006 through 2015.

Anna Schwartz was the longest-serving member of the Shadow Open Market Committee. One of the 12 original members in 1973, Schwartz continued to attend and participate actively in SOMC meetings through 2010.

== Subsequent and recent developments ==
In 2009, the SOMC moved the site of its bi-annual meetings back to New York City.

At its November 2014 meeting, the SOMC presented a statement of "Core Beliefs," intended to "help promote its vision and relevance in an era of increasingly complex central banking." The Core Beliefs relate to the conduct of monetary policy and to the Federal Reserve's role as lender of last resort. They are as follows:

1. The SOMC takes for granted that U.S. monetary policy will be conducted by the Fed over the foreseeable future.
2. It is essential that the central bank be independent from the fiscal authorities and accountable to the legislature. In particular, the central bank should eschew policies that allocate credit.
3. Price stability is the best contribution that monetary policy can make to overall macroeconomic performance and for this reason should be the primary objective of the central bank. "Price stability" should be defined to insure that the inflation rate, on average, is not above 2 percent per year.
4. Monetary policy should be conducted in a rule-like manner and be somewhat countercyclical with respect to output and employment, as long as price stability over the long run is not compromised. We expect the central bank to announce the policy rule that it follows so that it can be monitored and held accountable.
5. To provide financial stability, the central bank should promote strong capital buffers.
6. The SOMC expects the central bank will serve as a lender of last resort. In this role, the central bank should state its lender of last resort policy rules clearly in advance. Such activities should be limited to occasional, temporary, well-collateralized lending to solvent, supervised depository institutions at an appropriate interest rate premium. More expansive lending should be agreed and indemnified in advance by the fiscal authorities.
7. The SOMC believes that, by following these basic principles, the Fed would create the monetary and financial framework that best facilitates the efficient functioning of free- market, prosperity-creating, institutions in the U.S. economy.

== Original members ==
- Karl Brunner, University of Rochester
- Peter Crawford, First National City Bank
- William Ford, Ford Motor Company
- Homer Jones (1906–1986), Federal Reserve Bank of St. Louis
- Thomas Mayer, University of California at Davis
- Allan Meltzer, Carnegie Mellon University
- James Meigs (1921-2014), Argus Research Corporation
- Robert Rasche, Michigan State University
- Wilson Schmidt, Virginia Polytechnic Institute and State University
- Anna Schwartz (1915-2012), National Bureau of Economic Research
- Beryl Sprinkel, Harris Trust and Savings Bank
- William Wolman, Business Week magazine

== Past members ==
- Jagdish Bhagwati, Columbia University
- Robert Genetski, Harris Trust and Savings Bank
- Eric Heinneman, Morgan, Stanley & Company
- Lee Hoskins, Huntington National Bank
- Jerry Jordan, Pittsburgh National Bank and University of New Mexico
- Rudolph G. Penner, American Enterprise Institute
- William Poole, Brown University
- John Rutledge, Claremont Men's College
- Alan Stockman, University of Rochester
- Jan Tumlir, General Agreement on Tariffs and Trade
- Burton Zwick, Prudential Insurance Company

== Current members ==
As of April 2019, the following people are listed at the organization.

- Michael D. Bordo, Rutgers University
- Charles Calomiris, Columbia University
- Marvin Goodfriend, Carnegie Mellon University
- Greg Hess, Wabash College (Indiana)
- Peter Ireland, Boston College
- Mickey Levy, Berenberg Bank
- Deborah Lucas, Massachusetts Institute of Technology
- Bennett McCallum, Carnegie Mellon University
- Athanasios Orphanides, Massachusetts Institute of Technology
- Charles Plosser, Hoover Institution

== See also ==
- Federal Open Market Committee, the quasi-governmental organization for which the SOMC is named; Poole was a member of the FOMC after having been a member of the SOMC
- Council of Economic Advisers, group within the executive branch under the president; Sprinkel, Poole, and Jordan were former members
- Federal Reserve, the central bank of the United States, created in 1913
- Monetary inflation, the first major goal of the Fed
- Full employment, the second major goal of the Fed
- Flat money, the monetary system used in most countries for domestic and international trade purposes since the 1970s
- Gold standard, the monetary system used in the United States domestically until the 1930s and for international trade until 1971
- Stagflation, when both unemployment and monetary inflation simultaneously increase (experienced by the United States during the 1970s)
- Monetarism, a school of economic thought which opposes discretionary governmental manipulation of the money supply via the central bank
- Fiscalism, usually contrasted to monetarism
- Keynesian economics, a school of economic thought which justifies governmental deficits during economic downturns as a form of economic stimulus
- Austrian school of economics, usually contrasted to Keynesianism
- Chicago school of economics, non-Keynesian school of economic thought, based on monetarism or new classical macroeconomics
