= BanxQuote =

- Type: Private
- Industry: Banking; Financial services
- Founded: New York, New York (1984)
- Headquarters: White Plains, New York, United States
- Key people: Norbert Mehl, Founder & CEO
- Products: Banking and Loan Rates
- Website: www.banxquote.com

BanxQuote was a provider and licensor of indexes and analytics, which were used as a barometer of the U.S. banking and mortgage markets. Its bank rate website and consumer banking marketplace featured daily updated market rates on banking, mortgage and loan products in the United States, until its close in 2010.

== History and activities ==
BanxQuote was established by its parent BanxCorp in 1984, and its Internet operations were launched at a BanxQuote National Banking Conference held at Salomon Brothers in New York, on April 7, 1995.

Clients of the firm have included hundreds of financial institutions nationwide and its indexes were frequently used as a trusted source and performance benchmark by public policymakers, government agencies, major banks and corporations.

BanxQuote operated an online national banking marketplace for 15 years, until its exit in 2010.

It featured rates on money market accounts, savings and jumbo certificate of deposit (CDs), mortgage loans, home equity and auto loans for various terms and amounts.

BanxQuote also provided proprietary state-by-state, regional, and national composite benchmarks for its various banking and lending products. Clients of the firm have included hundreds of banks and financial institutions nationwide. In 1985, The Wall Street Journal started featuring BanxQuote for 17 consecutive years.

== BanxQuote on Bloomberg Terminal ==
BanxQuote current and historical proprietary data, indices, charts and analytical tools were available on Bloomberg Terminals from 1995 until its exit from the market in 2015, reaching over 250,000 financial market professionals worldwide.

== The BanxQuote Index, Trademark and Performance benchmarks ==
The Dow Jones Barron's Dictionary of Banking Terms defines the BanxQuote Money Market Index as an "Index of rates paid by investors on negotiable certificates of deposit and high yield savings accounts, compiled weekly by BanxCorp. The index offers a side-by-side comparison of rates paid by selected banks and savings institutions on small-denomination (under $10,000) savings accounts."

The BanxQuote Conforming-Jumbo Mortgage Index is typically used to analyze the historical spread between national average conforming and jumbo mortgage rates.

BanxQuote licenses its registered trademark, proprietary indices, data, analytical tools, and financial applications to third parties.

=== Case studies ===
- AAA (American Automobile Association) Money Markets & CDs
- General Electric Capital Corp. — GE Interest Plus
- Ford Interest Advantage Notes issued by Ford Motor Credit Company
- Bloomberg Professional terminals worldwide
- UBS, one of the world's leading financial institutions
- Discover Bank, part of Discover Financial Services
- Countrywide Bank
- MetLife Bank, a subsidiary of MetLife, Inc.
- Capital One Direct Banking
- Charles Schwab & Co.
- Zions Bank

== Usage ==
BanxQuote data are cited by various government agencies, policy makers, [GSEs], Non-Profit and Religious Organizations, and economists, such as outlined below.

=== U.S. government agencies ===
- The White House Council of Economic Advisers
- U.S. Senate Committee on Banking, Housing, and Urban Affairs
- U.S. Department of the Treasury
- Federal Deposit Insurance Corporation (FDIC)
- William Poole (Federal Reserve Bank president), Federal Reserve Bank of St. Louis
- Government Finance Officers Association
- Office of Federal Housing Enterprise Oversight (OFHEO)
- Office of Thrift Supervision (OTS) - Selected Asset and Liability Price Tables; As of June 30, 2007

=== Government Sponsored Enterprises (GSEs) ===
- The Role of Freddie Mac, the Federal Home Loan Mortgage Corporation
- Freddie Mac Provides Stability to the Mortgage Market.
- Wharton Financial Institutions Center, Working Paper: Measuring the Benefits of Fannie Mae and Freddie Mac to Consumers

=== Foundations, non-profit, judiciary, and religious organizations ===
- F.B. Heron Foundation - has established performance benchmarks for each asset class in its mission-related portfolio. The benchmark for deposits is the national average for two-year jumbo deposits as reported by BanxQuote.
- Michigan Court, Michigan Judicial Institute - CitiStreet Investing Webcast
- Diocese of Monterey, California In 2007, the bishop of Monterey established a policy that all funds of the Monterey diocese deposited in its Cash Management and Deposit and Loan programs would earn a rate tied to the BanxQuote Money Market Rate.
