= Charles Calomiris =

Charles William Calomiris (born November 8, 1957) is an American financial policy expert, author, and co-director of the Institute for Research in Economics in Washington, D.C. Previously, he was a professor at Columbia Business School, where he was the Henry Kaufman Professor of Financial Institutions and the Director of Columbia Business School Program for Financial Studies, and was director of the Center for Politics, Economics and History at UATX.

== Early life, education, and career ==
=== Early life and parentage ===
Born in Washington, D.C., his father was businessman William Calomiris, who was also born in Washington, D.C., to Greek immigrant parents and grew up in the Capitol Hill neighborhood. William Calomiris was a former president of the Washington Board of Trade and founder of the William Calomiris Investment Corp, which led efforts to create housing for low-income and middle-income Washington residents. In addition, he was a banker who served as director of both Lincoln National Bank and Jefferson Federal Savings & Loan, and also as an advisory director of Riggs National Bank. He also had been board chairman of the Washington Federal Savings Bank before its 1996 sale to First Maryland Bancorp. William Calomiris died in 2000, when he was 80 years old.

=== Education and career ===
Charles Calomiris received a B.A. in economics from Yale University and a Ph.D. in economics from Stanford University. Calomiris thereafter served in numerous capacities with organizations addressing economic policy, including serving as a Fellow at the Manhattan Institute for Policy Research, a member of the Shadow Open Market Committee, co-director of the Hoover Institution's Program on Regulation and the Rule of Law, and a Research Associate of the National Bureau of Economic Research. He has advised government entities as a researcher at the Office of Financial Research in the United States Department of the Treasury, and as a member of the International Financial Institution Advisory Commission of the United States Congress. Prior to joining the Columbia Business School faculty in 1996, he was an assistant professor of economics at Northwestern University and an associate professor of finance at the University of Illinois.

== Views ==
Calomiris was critical from the outset of the Dodd–Frank Wall Street Reform and Consumer Protection Act, a set of financial regulations passed in response to the 2008 financial crisis. Argued that the law doubles down on "too big to fail" and does not prevent the government from subsidizing mortgage risk, which fueled the crisis. He further cited the law's overly complicated and ambiguously worded provisions, and instead advocated alternative "incentive-robust" solutions, such as "a rule requiring that banks hold cash at the central bank equal to 20% of their assets", and "a minimum uninsured debt requirement for large banks in the form of subordinated debt".

In 2018, Calomiris argued in favor of capitalism, noting that many predictions made by Karl Marx have failed to materialize. In a September 2018 conference at Columbia University's Centre on Capitalism and Society, he argued that the improvement of the U.S. economy since 2016 "cannot be reasonably contested".

Religiously, Calomiris is a Greek Orthodox Christian.

== Fragile By Design ==
In 2014, Calomiris coauthored, with Stephen Haber, Fragile By Design: The Political Origins of Banking Panics and Scarce Credit. In the book, Calomiris and Haber argue that the problems faced by the banking industry arise from the extensive network of government regulations effectively directing how they do business, including that "geographic restrictions on banking made banks too small to weather regional economic shocks". The book received various accolades, including an American Publishers 2015 Award for best book in Business, Finance and Management, and being named to best books of the year lists by the Financial Times and Bloomberg Businessweek.
