= Robert King (economist) =

American macroeconomist

- Born: May 24, 1951 (age 75)

Academic background
- Education: Brown University
- Doctoral advisor: Herschel Grossman; William Poole; Harl Ryder

Academic work
- Discipline: Macroeconomics; Monetary economics
- School or tradition: New classical economics
- Institutions: Boston University; University of Virginia; University of Rochester
- Doctoral students: Gary Gorton; Sergio Rebelo
- Website: Information at IDEAS / RePEc

Robert Graham King (born May 24, 1951) is an American macroeconomist. King is a professor of economics at Boston University, where his fields are macroeconomics, monetary economics, and economic growth.

Before that he was a professor at the University of Rochester and then at the University of Virginia.

King is married to another macroeconomist, Marianne Baxter.

King's work spans many areas, including business cycle theory and measurement, real business cycle theory, monetary policy, and economic growth.

== Influential works ==
- Robert G. King; Sergio T. Rebelo (1999). "Resuscitating Real Business Cycles". Handbook of Macroeconomics. pp. 927–1007.
- Marianne Baxter; Robert G. King (1999). "Measuring Business Cycles: Approximate Band-Pass Filters for Economic Time Series" (PDF). The Review of Economics and Statistics. 81 (4): 575–593. doi:10.1162/003465399558454. S2CID 57567299.
- Michael Dotsey; Robert G. King; Alexander L. Wolman (1999). "State-Dependent Pricing and the General Equilibrium Dynamics of Money and Output". Quarterly Journal of Economics. 114 (2): 655–690. doi:10.1162/003355399556106.
- Marvin Goodfriend; Robert G. King (1997). "The New Neoclassical Synthesis and the Role of Monetary Policy". National Bureau of Economic Research Macroeconomics Annual: 231–283.
- Robert G. King; Ross Levine (1993). "Finance and Growth: Schumpeter Might be Right". The Quarterly Journal of Economics. 108 (3): 717–737. doi:10.2307/2118406. JSTOR 2118406. S2CID 56259311.
- Robert G. King; Sergio Rebelo (1993). "Transitional Dynamics and Economic Growth in Neoclassical Economies". American Economic Review. 83 (4): 908–931.
- Marianne Baxter; Robert G. King (1993). "Fiscal Policy in General Equilibrium". American Economic Review. 83 (3): 315–334.
- Robert G. King; Charles I. Plosser; Sergio T. Rebelo (1988). "Production, Growth and Business Cycles, I: The Basic Neo-classical Model". Journal of Monetary Economics. 21 (2–3): 195–232. doi:10.1016/0304-3932(88)90030-X.
- Robert J. Barro; Robert G. King (1984). "Time-Separable Preferences and Intertemporal-Substitution Models of Business Cycles". Quarterly Journal of Economics. 99 (4): 817–839. doi:10.2307/1883127. JSTOR 1883127. S2CID 154292934.

== See also ==
- Journal of Monetary Economics
