= Review (magazine) =

Magazine

- Type: Quarterly Economics Periodical
- Format: Magazine
- Owner: Federal Reserve Bank of St. Louis
- Publisher: Federal Reserve Bank of St. Louis
- Founded: 1962
- Language: English
- Headquarters: St. Louis, Missouri
- ISSN: 0014-9187
- Website: http://research.stlouisfed.org/publications/review/

Review is an American magazine covering national and international economic issues. It is published by the Federal Reserve Bank of St. Louis.
