= James Bullard =

James Bullard may refer to:

- James B. Bullard (born 1961), president of the Federal Reserve Bank of St Louis
- Jimmy Bullard (born 1978), English footballer
