= Tulane Corporate Law Institute =

Annual M&A and corporate law conference

The Tulane Corporate Law Institute is an annual two-day M&A and corporate law conference that takes place in downtown New Orleans every spring. It attracts the most high-profile lawyers and bankers from around the United States, as well as judges, journalists, and others who follow the dealmaking world. The event typically takes place on a Thursday and Friday in late March or early April, at a prominent Canal Street hotel.

== History ==
In the late 1980s, Delaware Supreme Court Justice Andrew G.T. Moore (author of Smith v. Van Gorkom and Revlon v. MacAndrews) and a group of New Orleans corporate practitioners were among those who undertook an aggressive goal: to establish a new annual platform for a gathering of the nation's leading corporate jurists and practitioners. More than 20 years later, the Tulane Corporate Law Institute remains a critical meeting place for national leaders in the fields of law and business.

The second day of the 22nd annual meeting (on April 16, 2010), coincided with the unexpected release of an SEC fraud complaint against Goldman Sachs. The release temporarily disrupted the day's meeting agenda as the story made national headlines and SEC officials were sought for comment in The Roosevelt Hotel. The news caused an immediate thirteen percent drop in Goldman's stock price, and a 1.3% decline in the market as a whole.

=== Past speakers ===
- Antonio Weiss, global head of investment banking, Lazard
- Damon Silvers, director of policy and special counsel, AFL-CIO—2011 keynote speaker
- Troy A. Paredes, SEC Commissioner—2010 keynote speaker
- Dr. William Poole, former president of the Federal Reserve Bank—2009 keynote speaker
- Paul S. Atkins, SEC commissioner—2008 keynote speaker
- Brian Cartwright, SEC general counsel and ex-Latham & Watkins partner
- Brackett B. Denniston III, senior vice president and general counsel, General Electric
- Robert A. Kindler, vice chairman of Morgan Stanley
- Martin Lipton, founding partner of Wachtell Lipton Rosen & Katz
- Christina Mohr, managing director, Citigroup Global Markets
- Joseph R. Perella, CEO of Perella Weinberg Partners
- Mark Shafir, global head of mergers and acquisitions, Citigroup
- Myron Steele, Delaware Supreme Court chief justice

=== Past media attendees ===
- David Faber, anchor, "Squawk on the Street," CNBC
- Andrew Ross Sorkin, head mergers and acquisitions reporter, The New York Times
- Dennis Berman, head mergers and acquisitions reporter, The Wall Street Journal

=== Past locations ===
- The Roosevelt Hotel New Orleans
- The Ritz-Carlton New Orleans
- Westin New Orleans Canal Place

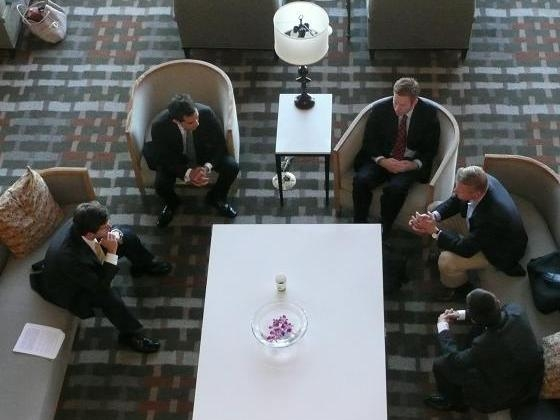
Students meet with the partner of a major law firm, April 3, 2009.

== Student-practitioner interaction ==
The Tulane Law School's Career Development Office typically organizes informational interviews among leading practitioners and select groups of Tulane law and JD/MBA students. In the past, students have met directly with a variety of business and governmental leaders, including partners of big New York City and Los Angeles law firms, in-house attorneys at major investment banks and hedge funds throughout the country, and the commissioner of the SEC.

== See also ==
- Corporate law
- Mergers and acquisitions
- Tulane University Law School
