= Gary Gorton =

American economist (born 1951)

- Born: c. 1951

Academic background
- Education: University of Rochester (PhD 1983); Cleveland State University (M.A. 1977); University of Michigan (M.A. 1974); Oberlin College (B.A. 1973)
- Influences: Robert Barro; Robert King

Academic work
- Discipline: Macroeconomics
- Institutions: Yale School of Management
- Notable ideas: Panic of 2007; Shadow banking system
- Website: Information at IDEAS / RePEc

Gary Bernard Gorton (born c. 1951) is an American economist who currently serves as the Frederick Frank Class of 1954 Professor of Finance at Yale School of Management. He is known for his theory on the role of repurchase agreements on the 2008 financial crisis.

As one of the top economists in the world, Gorton is frequently mentioned as a possible recipient of the Nobel Prize in Economics.

== Early life and education ==
Gorton was born to a psychiatrist in Phoenix, Arizona, in c. 1951. He earned a B.A. in Chinese Language and Literature from Oberlin College in 1973. After his undergraduate career, he followed a roundabout path to his current position in academia. He first obtained a M.A. in Chinese Studies from University of Michigan in 1974. He had thought of becoming an actor and even drove a cab in Cleveland. Eventually, he settled in graduate school in economics: he earned a M.A. in economics from Cleveland State University in 1977 and a M.A. in economics from the University of Rochester in 1980. He earned his Ph.D. in economics from University of Rochester in 1983. His dissertation was titled "Banking Panics" with the economists Robert Barro and Robert King on his dissertation committee.

== Career ==
After completing his Ph.D. in economics, Gorton joined the faculty at the Wharton School at the University of Pennsylvania. During this time, Gorton served as the director of the research program for the Federal Deposit Insurance Corporation and as a senior economist at the Federal Reserve in Philadelphia, where he focused on the financial markets, banks, and bank regulation. He is a former member of the Moody's Investors Services Academic Advisory Panel. He remained at the University of Pennsylvania for 24 years until he joined the faculty at the Yale School of Management. At the Yale School of Management, Gorton teaches a course titled "Capital Markets." Gorton has also taught at the University of Chicago's Booth School of Business and has worked at the Bank of England as a Houblon-Norman Fellow.

In his book titled "Slapped by the Invisible Hand: The Panic of 2007," Gorton wrote in May 2009 that the rise of the unregulated shadow banking system was a primary cause of the subprime mortgage crisis. Due to his work on the 2008 financial crisis, Gorton reported receiving death threats.

Gorton has been described as "something of an experts’ expert on financial systems". As an expert in stock and futures markets, banking, and asset pricing, he is an editor of the Review of Economic Studies and the Review of Financial Studies. He has also served on the editorial boards of Journal of Financial Services Research, the Journal of Financial Intermediation, the Journal of Financial Markets, the Journal of Money, Credit, and Banking, Advances in International Banking and Finance, Finance Letters, and the Economic Policy Review (of the Federal Reserve Bank of New York). In the 2020s, Gorton turned his attention to studying the run-risk of stablecoins.
