= BanxCorp =

BanxCorp is a financial services firm established since 1984. The company was founded by its CEO Norbert Mehl, a Swiss-born, New York-based, multilingual serial entrepreneur and international finance professional engaged in startups, M&A, financial services, and real estate..

BanxCorp

== BanxQuote ==
Over a period of three decades, the company's BanxQuote unit was the foremost provider and licensor of indexes and analytics used as a barometer of the U.S. banking and mortgage markets until its exit in 2015. Its banking and mortgage benchmarking solutions, historical indices and analytical tools have been available online for nearly two decades on WSJ.com, The Wall Street Journal, Bloomberg Professional terminals, and other leading media. BanxQuote was featured by the White House in the 2008 Economic Report of the President.

Clients of the firm have included hundreds of financial institutions nationwide. BanxQuote operated an online B2C national banking and mortgage marketplace for 15 years, until its exit in 2010.

From the mid 80s until the late 90s, the firm’s predecessor, MasterFund Inc., also led by its founder and CEO Norbert Mehl, had joint ventures with various retail and wholesale fixed income broker dealers, with a physical presence on their trading floors. During this period the firm originated, routed and facilitated the placement of several billion dollars of consumer and institutional brokered deposits at hundreds of banks nationwide.

== Comment ==
| |
