= Michael Boskin =

American economist (born 1945)

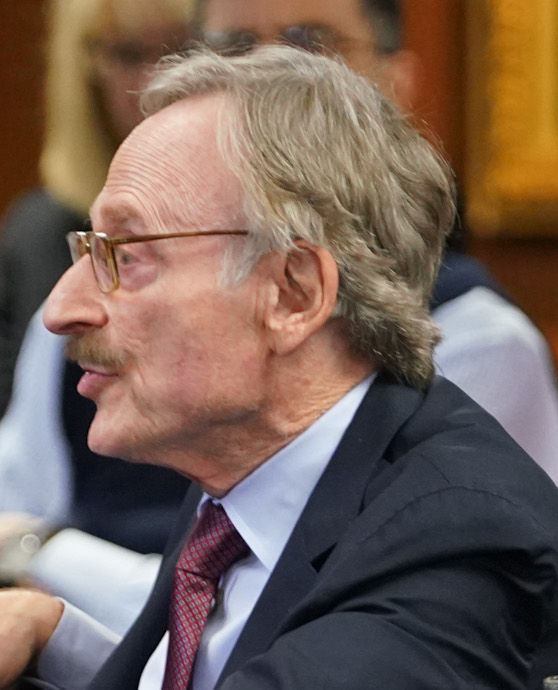
- Boskin in 2020

15th Chair of the Council of Economic Advisers
- In office February 2, 1989 – January 20, 1993
- President: George H. W. Bush
- Preceded by: Beryl Sprinkel
- Succeeded by: Laura Tyson

Personal details
- Born: September 23, 1945 (age 81) New York City, New York, U.S.
- Party: Republican
- Spouse: Chris Dornin (m. 1981)
- Education: University of California, Berkeley (BA, MA, PhD)

Michael Jay Boskin (born September 23, 1945) is the T. M. Friedman Professor of Economics and senior fellow at Stanford University's Hoover Institution. He also is chief executive officer and president of Boskin & Co., an economic consulting company, and serves on the Commerce Department's Advisory Committee on the National Income and Product Accounts.

== Early life and education ==
Boskin holds B.A. with highest honors, M.A., and Ph.D. degrees in economics from the University of California, Berkeley, earned in 1967, 1968, and 1971 respectively. He is a member of Phi Beta Kappa.

== Career ==
He joined Stanford University in 1970. He is a research associate at the National Bureau of Economic Research.

Boskin has been a director of ExxonMobil since 1996.

He has been a regular contributor to Project Syndicate since 2009. He also served as the chair of the Boskin Commission, which changed the way inflation was measured.

He is a director of Oracle Corporation. He currently serves on the Commerce Department's Advisory Committee on the National Income and Product Accounts.

== Publications ==
- Too Many Promises: The Uncertain Future of Social Security, 1986.
- Too Many Promises: The Uncertain Future of Social Security, Dow-Jones-Irwin, 1986.
- Reagan and the Economy: Successes, Failures, Unfinished Agenda, Institute for Contemporary Studies, 1987.
- The Economic Report of the President, with R. Schmalensee and J. Taylor, United States Government Printing Office, 1990.
- The Economic Report of the President, with R. Schmalensee and J. Taylor, United States Government Printing Office, 1991.
- The Economic Report of the President, with D. Bradford and P. Wonnacott, United States Government Printing Office, 1992.
- The Economic Report of the President, with D. Bradford and P. Wonnacott, United States Government Printing Office, 1993.

=== Books edited ===
- The Crisis in Social Security, Institute for Contemporary Studies, 1977 (editor).
- Federal Tax Reform, Institute for Contemporary Studies, 1978 (editor).
- Economics and Human Welfare: Essays in Honor of Tibor Scitovsky, Academic Press, 1979 (editor).
- The Economics of Taxation, with H. Aaron, Brookings, 1980 (editor).
- The Economy in the 1980s: A Program for Stability and Growth, Institute for Contemporary Studies, 1980 (editor).
- The Federal Budget: Economics and Politics, with A. Wildavsky, Institute for Contemporary Studies, 1982 (editor).
- Private Saving and Public Debt, with J. Flemming and S. Gorini, Basil Blackwell, 1986 (editor).
- Modern Developments in Public Finance, Basil Blackwell, 1987 (editor).
- Economics of Public Debt, with K. Arrow, MacMillan, 1988 (editor).
- Frontiers of Tax Reform, Hoover Institution Press, 1996 (editor).
- Nafta At Twenty: The Past, Present and Future of the North American Free Trade Agreement, Hoover Institution Press, 2014 (editor).
- Defense Budgeting for a Safer World: The Experts Speak, Hoover Institution Press, 2023 (editor).
- American Federalism Today: Perspectives on Political and Economic Governance, Hoover Institution Press, 2024 (editor).

=== Journal articles ===
- "The negative income tax and the Supply of Work Effort," National Tax Journal, December 1967, (undergraduate senior honors thesis).
- "The Effects of Taxes on the Supply of Labor: With Special Reference to Income Maintenance Programs," National Tax Association Papers and Proceedings, 1971.
- "Unions and Relative Real Wages," American Economic Review, June 1972.
- "Local Government Tax and Product Competition and the Optimal Provision of Public Goods," Journal of Political Economy, January 1973.
- "Economics of the Labor Supply," in G. Cain and H. Watts, eds., Labor Supply and Income Maintenance, Rand McNally, 1973.
- "Theoretical Models of Local Government Finance," Proceedings of the 26th Congress of the International Institute of Public Finance, 1973.
- "A Conditional Logic Model of Occupational Choice," Journal of Political Economy, March 1974.
- "The Effects of Government Expenditures and Taxes on Female Labor," American Economic Review, May 1974.
- "Regression Analysis when the Dependent Variable is Truncated Lognormal: with an Application to the Determinants of the Duration of Welfare Dependency," (with T. Amemiya), International Economic Review, June 1974.
- "Efficiency Aspects of the Differential Tax Treatment of Market and Household Economic Activity", Journal of Public Economics, February 1975.
- "Lessons from the New Jersey-Pennsylvania Income Maintenance Experiment," in M. Timpane and A. Rivlin, eds., Evaluating the New Jersey-Pennsylvania Income Maintenance Experiment, 1975.
- "A Markov Model of Turnover in Aid to Families with Dependent Children," (with F. Nold), Journal of Human Resources, Autumn 1975.
- "Notes on the Tax Treatment of Human Capital," U.S. Department of the Treasury, Proceedings of the Treasury Conference on Tax Policy, 1975.
- "Estate Taxation and Charitable Bequests," Journal of Public Economics, January 1976.
- "Recent Econometric Research in Public Finance," American Economic Review, May 1976.
- "The Economic Common Sense of the Debate over Controlling Nuclear Power Development," in W. Reynolds, ed., The California Nuclear Initiative, Stanford University Press, 1976; also in Federal Reserve Bank of San Francisco, California
- "Energy: The Economic Factors", 1976.
- "Social Security and Retirement Decisions," Economic Inquiry, January 1977.
- "An Economist's Perspective on Estate Taxation," in The Future of Wealth Transmission, American Assembly, 1977.
- "Effects of the Charitable Deduction on Contributions by Low and Middle Income Households: Evidence from the National Survey of Philanthropy," (with M. Feldstein), Review of Economics and Statistics, August 1977.
- "Taxation and Aggregate Factor Supply: Preliminary Estimates," (with L. Lau), U.S. Treasury Compendium of Tax Research, 1978.
- "Taxation and Capital Formation: Missing Elements in the President's Tax Program," (with J. Green), in R. Penner, Ed., Tax Policies in the 1979 Budget, AEI, 1978.
- "Taxation, Saving and the Rate of Interest," Journal of Political Economy, April 1978.
- "Optimal Tax Theory, Econometric Evidence and Tax Policy," in R. Stone, ed., Econometric Contributions to Public Policy, MacMillan for the International Economic Associations, 1978.
- "Optimal Redistributive Taxation when Individual Welfare Depends upon Relative Income," (with E. Sheshinski), The Quarterly Journal of Economics, November 1978.
- "The Effect of Social Security on Early Retirement," (with M. Hurd), Journal of Public Economics, August 1978.
- "The Long-Run Incidence of Government Policies in Open Growing Economies," (with P. Deville), in M. Boskin, ed., Economics and Human Welfare: Essays in Honor of Tibor Scitovsky, Academic Press, 1979.
- "Economic Factors Behind the Tax Revolt, National Tax Journal, October 1979.
- "Interrelationships Among the Choice of Tax Base, Tax Rates and the Unit and Time Period of Account in the Design of an Optimal Tax System," in H. Aaron and M. Boskin, eds., The Economics of Taxation, Brookings, 1980.
- "Social Security and Private Saving: Analytical Issues, Empirical Evidence and Policy Implications," (with M. Robinson), U.S. Congress, Joint Economic Committee, Special Study on Economic Change, 1980.
- "The Impact of Inflation on U.S. Productivity and International Competitiveness," (with
- M. Gertler and C. Taylor), National Planning Association, 1980.
- "Social Security: The Challenge Before Us," in P. Duignan and A. Rabushka, eds., The United States in the 1980s, Hoover Institution, 1980.
- "Growth Policy for the Eighties," U.S. Department of Commerce, Proceedings of the Workshop on Supply-Side Economics, 1980.
- "Issues in the Taxation of Capital Income," (with J. Shoven), American Economic Review, May 1981.
- "Some Issues in Supply-Side Economics," in K. Brunner and A. Meltzer, eds., Supply Shocks, Incentives and National Wealth, Carnegie-Rochester Conference Series on Public Policy, 1981.
- "Taxation, Innovation and Economic Growth," in Technology in Society, Vol. 3, 1981.
- "Federal Government Deficits: Myths and Realities," American Economic Review, May 1982.
- "Modeling Alternative Solutions to the Long-Run Social Security Funding Problem," (with M. Avrin and Ken Cone), in M. Feldstein, ed., Behavioral Simulations of Tax Policy, University of Chicago Press, 1983.
- "Optimal Tax Treatment of the Family," (with E. Sheshinski), Journal of Public Economics, April 1983.
- "Effects of Budgetary Constraints and Budgetary Cuts," Proceedings: International Institute of Public Finance, Budapest, Hungary, 1983.
- "A Longer Term Perspective on Macroeconomics and Distribution: Time, Expectations, and Incentives," in G. Feiwel, ed., Issues in Contemporary Economics and Distribution, The MacMillan Press, 1984.
- "Concepts and Measures of Earnings Replacement during Retirement," (with J. Shoven), NBER Conference Volume, J. Shoven and D. Wise, eds., Issues in Pension Economics, University of Chicago Press, 1987.
- "The Effect of Social Security on Retirement in the Early 1970's (with M. Hurd), The Quarterly Journal of Economics, November 1984.
- "Poverty Among the Elderly: Where Are the Holes in the Safety Net?" (with J. Shoven), paper presented at the NBER Conference on Pensions and the U.S. Economy, Baltimore, MD, March 21–22, 1985, in Z. Bodie, J Shoven, and D. Wise, eds., Pensions in the U.S. Economy, University of Chicago Press, 1988.
- "Macroeconomics, Technology and Economic Policy," in R. Landau and N. Rosenberg, eds., Technology and Economy Policy, National Academy Press, 1985.
- "Changes in the Age Distribution of Income in The United States, 1964–84," (with L. Kotlikoff and M. Knetter), NBER Working Paper, #1766, 1985.
- "Economic Aspects of the Taxation of Decontrolled Natural Gas," (with M. Robinson), National Tax Journal, June 1985.
- "Public Debt and U.S. Saving: A New Test of the Neutrality Hypothesis," (with L. Kotlikoff), in Carnegie-Rochester Conference Series, No. 23, Summer 1985.
- "Deficits, Public Debt, Interest Rates & Private Saving: Perspectives and Reflections on Recent Analysis and U.S. Experience," in M. Boskin, J. Flemming and S. Gorini, eds., Private Saving and Public Debt, Basil Blackwell, 1986.
- "Indexing Social Security Benefits: A Separate Price Index for the Elderly?" (with M. Hurd), Public Finance Quarterly, Vol. 13, No. 4, October 1985.
- "Energy Taxes and Optimal Tax Theory," (with M. Robinson), The Energy Journal, September 1985.
- "New Estimates of the Value of Federal Mineral Rights and Land," (with M. Robinson, et al.), American Economic Review, December 1985.
- "Theoretical and Empirical Issues in the Measurement, Evaluation and Interpretation of Post-War U.S. Saving," in G. Adams and S. Wachter, eds., Saving and Capital Formation: The Policy Options, Lexington Books/D.C. Health, 1986.
- "Saving and Economic Growth in the United States: Policy Issues and Options," U.S. Congress, A Symposium on the 40th Anniversary of the Joint Economic Committee, January 16–17, 1986.
- "New Estimates of the Effects of Taxes on the International Location of Investment," (with W. Gale), in M. Feldstein, ed., The Effects of Taxation on Capital Formation, University of Chicago Press, 1987.
- "Social Security: A Financial Appraisal within and Across Generations," (with J. Shoven, L. Kotlikoff and D. Puffert), National Tax Journal, March 1987.
- "A Closer Look at Saving Rates in the United States and Japan," (with J. Roberts), in J. Shoven, ed., Government Policy Towards Industry in the U.S. and Japan, Cambridge University Press, 1988.
- "Social Security and the American Family," in Federal Tax Policy, ed. by L. Summers, 1987.
- "New Estimates of the State and Local Government Capital Stock and Net Investment," (with M. Robinson and A. Huber), NBER Working Paper, 1987.
- "Alternative Concepts and Measures of Federal Deficits and Debt and Their Impact on Economic Activity," in K. Arrow and M. Boskin, eds., Economics of Public Debt, MacMillan for the International Economic Association, 1988. (NBER Working Paper, 1987).
- "The Federal Budget and Insurance Programs," (with B. Barham, K. Cone and S. Ozler), in M. Boskin, ed., Modern Developments in Public Finance, Basil Blackwell, 1987.
- "Perspectives on the Tax Reform Act of 1986," National Tax Association Annual Proceedings, 1986, published 1987.
- "The Financial Impact of Social Security by Cohort," in E. Lazear and R. Ricardo-Campbell, eds., Issues in Contemporary Retirement, Hoover Institution Press, 1988.
- "Personal Security Accounts: An Alternative Social Security Reform Proposal," (with J. Shoven and L. Kotlikoff), in S. Wachter, ed., Social Security and Private Pensions, Lexington Books, 1988.
- "Future Social Security Financing Alternatives and National Saving," S. Wachter and M. Wachter, eds., Social Security and Private Pensions: Providing for Retirement in the 21st Century, Lexington Books, 1988.
- "An Analysis of Postwar U.S. Consumption and Saving," (with L. Lau) NBER Working Paper Nos. 2605–2606, 1988.
- "Consumption, Saving and Fiscal Policy," American Economic Review, Vol. 78, No. 2, May 1988.
- "Tax Policy and Economic Growth: Lessons from the 1980s," Journal of Economic Perspectives, Vol. 2, No. 4, Fall 1988.
- "Government Saving, Capital Formation and Wealth in the United States, 1947–1985," (with M. Robinson and A. Huber) in R. Lipsey and H. Stone, eds., The Measurement of Saving, Investment, and Wealth, The University of Chicago Press, 1989.
- "Issues in the Measurement and Interpretation of Saving and Wealth," in E. Berndt and J. Triplett, eds., Fifty Years of Economic Measurement: The Jubilee of the Conference on Research in Income and Wealth, The University of Chicago Press, 1990.
- "Capital Formation and Economic Growth," (with L. Lau) in Technology and Economics: A Volume Commemorating Ralph Landau's Service to the National Academy of Engineering, National Academy Press, 1991.
- "International and Intertemporal Comparison of Productive Efficiency: An Application of the Meta-Production Function Approach to the Group-of-Five (G-5) Countries," (with L. Lau) Economic Studies Quarterly, Vol. 43, No. 4, 1992.
- "Capital, Technology, and Economic Growth," with L. Lau in N. Rosenberg, R. Landau and D. Mowery, eds. Technology and the Wealth of Nations, Stanford University Press, 1992.
- "Reflections on the Bush Regulatory Record: The Good, the Bad, and the Ugly," Regulation, 1993, Number 3.
- "A Conference Panel Discussion: The Role of Rules in Monetary Policy," Review, March/April 1994, Vol. 76, No. 2: The Federal Reserve Bank of St. Louis.
- "The Contribution of R&D to Economic Growth: Some Issues and Observations," (with L. Lau), AEI/Brookings, eds., 1996.
- "Building a Better California: The Tax Reform Component," with other members of the Task Force on California Tax Reform and Reduction.
- "Toward a More Accurate Measure of the Cost of Living: Interim Report," (with E. Dulberger, R. Gordon, Z. Griliches and D. Jorgenson), The Advisory Commission to Study the Consumer Price Index, 1995.
- "A Framework for Understanding the Tax Reform Debate," in M. Boskin, ed., Frontiers of Tax Reform, 1996, Hoover Institution Press.
- "An Economist's Evaluation of the Political Discourse on Fundamental Tax Reform Proposals," Center for Economic Policy Research Discussion Paper Series Publication No. 446, December 1995.
- "Toward a More Accurate Measure of the Cost of Living: Final Report to the Senate Finance Committee," (with E. Dulberger, R. Gordon, Z. Griliches and D. Jorgenson), Washington, D.C., U.S. Government Printing Office, for the U.S. Senate Committee on Finance, December 1996.
- "Lies, Damned Lies, and (Faulty) Statistics," The International Economy, Jan/Feb 1997.
- "The CPI Commission," Business Economics, March 1997.
- "The CPI Commission: Findings and Recommendations," (with E. Dulberger, R. Gordon, Z. Griliches and D. Jorgenson), American Economic Review, May 1997.
- "Implications of Overstating Inflation for Indexing Government Programs and Understanding Economic Growth," (with D. Jorgenson), American Economic Review, May 1997.
- "Inflation and Its Discontents," The American Economic Association/American Finance Association Joint Luncheon Address, Hoover Essays in Public Policy, 1997.
- "Some Thoughts on Improving Economic Statistics," US Congress, Joint Economic Committee, October 1997; also appears in Hoover Essays in Public Policy, 1998.
- "Consumer Prices, the Consumer Price Index and the Cost of Living," (with E. Dulberger, R. Gordon, Z. Griliches, and D. Jorgenson) Journal of Economic Perspectives, Winter 1998.
- "Capitalism and Its Discontents," The Adam Smith Prize Lecture, Business Economics, January 1999.
- "From Edgeworth to Vickrey to Mirrlees," The Vickrey Distinguished Lecture, International Atlantic Economic Society, Atlantic Economic Journal, March, 2000.
- "Measuring Economic Performance: Progress and Challenges," American Economic Review, May 2000.
- "Generalized Solow Neutral Technical Progress and Postwar Economic Growth," with Lawrence J. Lau, NBER Working Paper No. 8023, December 2000.
- "At What Price? Review of National Academy Panel Report on the Consumer Price Index", January 2003, AEA Meetings.
- "The Comparative Postwar Economic Performance of the G-7 Countries", with L. Lau, mimeo May, 2003.
- "Consumer Price Indexes", Concise Encyclopedia of Economics, D. Henderson, ed., Liberty Fund, Inc., Library of Economics and Liberty, Fall 2004.
- "The Economic Agenda: A View from the U.S.", Review of International Economics, Fall 2004.
- "Causes and Consequences of Bias in the Consumer Price Index as a Measure of the Cost of Living", Atlantic Economic Journal 33(1), March, 2005.
- "Perspectives on Tax Reform", Tax Notes, January 2006.
- "Eight Lessons of Public Finance in Developing Countries", China Development Forum, State Council of the People's Republic of China, Beijing, March, 2006.
- "Taxation and Saving," Tax Notes, May 2006.
- "Economic Perspectives on Deficits and Debt," in Fiscal Challenges: An Interdisciplinary Approach to Budget Policy, Elizabeth Garrett, Elizabeth A. Grady, & Howell E. Jackson, eds., Cambridge University Press, 2008.
- "Consumer Price Indexes", Concise Encyclopedia of Economics, D. Henderson, ed., Indianapolis, Liberty Fund, Inc., Library of Economics and Liberty, 2008.
- "Perspectives on the New Architecture for the U.S. National Accounts", in American Economic Review, Papers and Proceedings, May, 2009.
- "Better Living Through More Accurate Consumer Price Indexes", in: Better Living Through Economics, John J. Siegfried, ed., Cambridge, Harvard University Press, 2009.
- Final Report of the commission on the 21st Century Economy (with Ruben Barrales, John Cogan, Edward De La Rosa, Christopher Edley Jr., Monica Lozano, Becky Morgan, Gerald Parsky and Curt Pringle), Gerald Parsky, ed., State of California, 2009.
- Review of This Time is Different, by K. Rogoff and C. Reinhart. Journal of Economic Literature, 2010.
- "Grading Forty Years of Tax Policy", in Forty Years of Change, One Constant: Tax Analysts, 40th Anniversary Special Publication. Tax Analysts, 2011.
- "Notes on the Economics of Nuclear Power," in Sidney D. Drell and George P. Shultz, eds., The Nuclear Enterprise, High Consequence Accidents: How to Enhance Safety and Minimize Risks in Nuclear Weapons and Reactors. Stanford, 2012.
- "Fiscal Policy for Economic Growth", in J. Stiglitz, A. Edlin, B. DeLong eds, The Economists' Voice, 2012.
- M. Boskin, L. Lawrence, M. Spence, eds., U.S. China Economic Relations in the Next Ten Years: Towards Deeper Engagement and Mutual Benefit. Hong Kong, China-United States Exchange Foundation 2013.
- "Milton Friedman's Contributions To Fiscal Economics," (p.401) In Robert Cord, Ed., Milton Friedman: Contributions To Economics And Public Policy. Oxford University Press, 2016.
- "The Domestic Landscape", (p.. 1) in Blueprint for America, George Shultz, ed., Stanford, Hoover Press, Hoover Institution Press Publications 2016. #673.
- "A Blueprint for Tax Reform", (p. 27) in Blueprint for America, George Shultz, ed., Stanford, Hoover Press, Hoover Institution Press Publications 2016. #673.
- "Reforming Regulation", (p. 51) in Blueprint for America, George Shultz, ed., Stanford, Hoover Press, Hoover Institution Press Publications 2016. #673.
- "The Political Economy of Social Security Reform", with D. Perez and D. Bennett, NBER Working Paper No. 25985, June 2019.
- "Paul Samuelson's Contributions to Fiscal Economics", in R. Cord, ed., P. Samuelson, Master of Modern Economics. Palgrave, 2019.
- "Are Large Deficits and Debt Dangerous?" American Economic Association Papers and Proceedings, 2020.

== Reception ==
Boskin is the recipient of the Adam Smith Prize.

According to Patrick Buchanan, in Death of Manufacturing, Boskin was sanguine about the transfer of United States manufacturing overseas.

Political offices
Preceded by Beryl Sprinkel	Chair of the Council of Economic Advisers; 1989–1993	Succeeded by Laura Tyson
