= Alberto Musalem =

Federal Reserve Bank of St. Louis President

President of the Federal Reserve Bank of St. Louis
- Incumbent
- Assumed office April 2, 2024
- Preceded by: Kathleen O’Neill Paese (acting)

Personal details
- Born: November 15, 1968 (age 57) Bogotá, Colombia
- Education: London School of Economics (BS, MS); University of Pennsylvania (PhD)

Alberto G. Musalem is an American economist and financial market practitioner who is the President of the Federal Reserve Bank of St. Louis. He assumed office on 2 April 2024, replacing James Bullard, who quit in order to be a dean at Purdue University.

He is the first Hispanic president of a regional Reserve Bank. In this role, Musalem regularly gives public remarks and speeches on economic conditions and engages with communities in the Eighth Federal Reserve District.

Musalem previously served as CEO and co-CIO of Evince Asset Management LP, a quantitative investment technology company he co-founded in 2018. From 2014-2017, Musalem was executive vice president and senior advisor to the president at the Federal Reserve Bank of New York.

From 2000 to 2013, he worked at Tudor Investment Corporation, where his positions included managing director, partner and global head of research. Earlier in his career, Musalem served as an economist at the International Monetary Fund.

He graduated from the London School of Economics with a BSc and Msc in economics, and from the University of Pennsylvania with a PhD in economics in 1996.

== Personal life ==
Musalem was born in Bogota, Colombia. He is married to Claudia Pinto, with whom he has three children.

Other offices
Preceded by Kathleen O’Neill Paese; Acting	President of the Federal Reserve Bank of St. Louis; 2024–present	Incumbent
