= Federal Reserve Bank of St. Louis Little Rock Branch =

The Federal Reserve Bank of St. Louis Little Rock Branch is a branch of the Federal Reserve Bank of St. Louis established in 1918. The Branch provided check processing operations until 2003, when these services were moved to the Memphis Branch. The branch is responsible for the western 2/3 of the state of Arkansas.

== Current Board of Directors ==
The following people are on the board of directors as of Jan. 1, 2024:

Name	Title	Term Expires
Jamie J. Henry (Chair)	Vice President of Finance, Emerging Payments at Walmart Inc. Bentonville, Ark.	Dec. 31, 2024
Jennifer J. Anglin	Senior Site Director, Pernod Ricard; Fort Smith, Arkansas	Dec. 31, 2026
Christopher B. Hegi	President and CEO, First Financial Bank; El Dorado, Arkansas	Dec. 31, 2025
Jeff Lynch	President and CEO, Eagle Bank & Trust Co. Little Rock, Arkansas	Dec. 31, 2024
Denise Thomas	CEO, World Trade Center Arkansas, University of Arkansas; Rogers, Arkansas	Dec. 31, 2026
Allison J. H. Thompson	President and CEO, Economic Development Alliance for Jefferson County, Arkansas; Pine Bluff, Arkansas	Dec. 31, 2025
Darrin Williams	CEO, Southern Bancorp Inc. Little Rock, Arkansas	Dec. 31, 2026

== Little Rock Branch Regional Executive ==
The Little Rock branch is led by Regional Executive Matuschka Briggs, who currently serves on the boards of directors of Mercy Hospital East Communities, Mercy Hospital Patient Experience and Missouri Arts Council Board.

== See also ==
- Federal Reserve Act
- Federal Reserve System
- Federal Reserve Districts
- Federal Reserve Branches
- Federal Reserve Bank of St. Louis
- Federal Reserve Bank of St. Louis Louisville Branch
- Federal Reserve Bank of St. Louis Memphis Branch
- Structure of the Federal Reserve System
