= Federal Reserve Bank of St. Louis Louisville Branch =

The Federal Reserve Bank of St. Louis Louisville Branch is a branch of the Federal Reserve Bank of St. Louis established in 1917. The branch is responsible for southern Indiana and central/western Kentucky. The branch is located in the PNC Tower in downtown Louisville.

== Current Board of Directors ==
The following people are on the board of directors as of January 1, 2023:

Name	Title	Term Expires
Emerson M. Goodwin (Chair)	Senior Vice President of Business Development, ARcare; Bentonville, Arkansas	December 31, 2024
Tara E. Barney	Former CEO, Evansville Regional Economic Partnership; Evansville, Indiana	December 31, 2026
Dave W. Christopher Sr.	Executive Director, AMPED Louisville; Louisville, Kentucky	December 31, 2024
Condrad Daniels	President, HJI Supply Chain Solutions Louisville, Kentucky	December 31, 2026
James A. Hillebrand	Chairman and CEO, Stock Yards Bank & Trust Louisville, Kentucky	December 31, 2025
David E. Tatman	Assistant Plant Manager and Director of Engineering, Bendix Commercial Vehicle Systems Bowling Green, Kentucky	December 31, 2025
Carrie A. Warren	President, Bank of Buffalo Hodgenville, Kentucky	December 31, 2026

== Louisville Branch Regional Executive ==
The St. Louis Fed's Louisville branch is led by Regional Executive Seema Sheth, who currently serves on the board of Metro United Way as well as the vice president and governance chair of Actors Theatre of Louisville. She has been recognized as a MOSAIC Award recipient by the Jewish Career and Family Services Foundation, the Girl Scouts of Kentuckiana, and by Louisville Business First as one of the 20 people to know in finance and has been featured in TOPS Louisville, Style Blueprint and Today's Woman magazines as a leader in business.

== See also ==
- Federal Reserve Act
- Federal Reserve System
- Federal Reserve Districts
- Federal Reserve Branches
- Federal Reserve Bank of St. Louis
- Federal Reserve Bank of St. Louis Little Rock Branch
- Federal Reserve Bank of St. Louis Memphis Branch
- Structure of the Federal Reserve System
