= Sérgio Rebelo =

Portuguese economist (born 1959)

Sérgio T. Rebelo
- Born: October 29, 1959 (age 66); Portugal

Academic background
- Education: University of Rochester
- Doctoral advisor: Robert G. King; Paul Romer

Academic work
- Discipline: Macroeconomics, international finance
- Institutions: Kellogg School of Management, University of Rochester, Portuguese Catholic University
- Website: Information at IDEAS / RePEc

Sérgio T. Rebelo (born October 29, 1959) is a Portuguese economist who is the current MUFG Bank Distinguished Professor of International Finance at the Kellogg School of Management in Illinois, United States. He is also a co-director of the Center for International Macroeconomics at Northwestern University.

He received his doctorate in economics from University of Rochester in 1989, and has served in a variety of roles in the non-profit sector. He is a fellow of the Econometric Society, the National Bureau of Economic Research, and a research fellow at the Center for Economic and Policy Research. He has been a member of the editorial board of various academic journals which include American Economic Review, the European Economic Review, the Journal of Monetary Economics, and the Journal of Economic Growth.

He has studied the causes of business cycles, the impact of economic policy on economic growth, and the sources of exchange rate fluctuations. His research primarily focuses on macroeconomics, economic systems, and international finance.

== Education and academic career ==
Rebelo was born on October 29, 1959, in Portugal. He received his Licenciatura in Economics from Portuguese Catholic University in 1981, and went on to receive a master's degree in operations research at the Technical University of Lisbon in 1985, before being awarded a master's degree and doctorate in economics at the University of Rochester in 1987 and 1989, respectively. His dissertation was supervised by Robert King and Paul Romer.

Rebelo accepted an appointment as assistant professor of finance at Northwestern University in 1988, becoming an associate professor there in 1991. In 1992, Rebelo accepted an appointment as Associate Professor of Economics at the University of Rochester, where he stayed until 1997. In 1997, Rebelo moved to the Kellogg School of Management to become the Tokai Bank Distinguished Professor of International Finance and served as chair of the Finance Department between 2000 and 2002. Besides for his permanent academic appointments, Rebelo also served as a visiting assistant professor in 1990–1991 and 1991–1992 at the Catholic University of Portugal (where he had previously been an instructor from 1981 to 1984.) For the 1991–1992 school year, Rebelo was the director of the executive program in banking as well as the director of the finance M.B.A. program at the Catholic University of Portugal.

Rebelo has served in a number of roles outside of academia as well. From 1990 to 1992, Rebelo coordinated a major World Bank aimed at investigating the extent to which national economic policies effected long term growth rates, a project which built on his academic interests. Between 1990 and 1992, Rebelo also served as research coordinator for the Bank of Portugal. Rebelo is currently a research associate at the National Bureau of Economic Research, where he focuses on issue of international finance, as well as a research fellow at the Center for Economic and Policy Research. Rebelo was made a fellow of the Econometric Society in 2006.

== Publications ==
Rebelo has published a large number of highly cited papers; As of October 18, 2013, his work has been cited more than 20,000 times. He has published more than 130 refereed articles. His most well-known publication, "Long run policy analysis and long run growth" grew out of his dissertation work and focused on the effects of national policies on economic growth. One of his other most widely cited papers also examined the relationship between national policy and economic growth, and was published in 1993, entitled "Fiscal policy and economic growth."

Rebelo has also held a number of editorial positions. From 1995 to 1998, he was an associate editor of the European Economic Review, and from 1995 to 2001, he edited the American Economic Review. He also served as associate editor of the Journal of Economic Growth from 1997 to 2004, associate editor of the Journal of the European Economic Association for 2003–2004, and has been an associate editor of the Journal of Monetary Economics since 1995.

== Research focus ==
Rebelo's main body of research has focused on "the causes of business cycles, the impact of economic policy on economic growth, and the behavior of exchange rates". He has studied how incentives to spend change when interest rates are near zero, using the 2008 financial crisis as a model. The work he did in his dissertation led to several different research tracks, one of the most prominent being the effect of taxation on economic growth. In a broader sense, much of his research focuses on the effect fiscal policy (including taxation) has on economic growth. A significant portion of his work focuses on business cycles, economic growth, and exchange rates.

== Personal life ==
Rebelo is a contributor to the blog Salt of Portugal. Advisor to the Independent Evaluation Office of the International Monetary Fund, 2015. Advisory Council member, Global Markets Institute at Goldman Sachs, since April 2012 until present. Jerónimo Martins, non-executive board member since April 2013 until present, president of Audit Committee and non-executive member of Warta and New World supervisory boards since April 2016 until present. Integrated DNA Technologies, non-executive board member since September 2015 until sale of company in April 2018. Trustee, Allstate Structured Settlement Trust, since January 2018.

== Selected publications ==
- Rebelo, Sergio (1991). "Long Run Policy Analysis and Long Run Growth". Journal of Political Economy. 99 (3): 500–521. CiteSeerX 10.1.1.295.3609. doi:10.1086/261764. S2CID 14215251.
- Rebelo, Sergio; RG King; CI Plosser (1988). "Production, growth and business cycles: The basic neoclassical model". Journal of Monetary Economics. 21 (2): 195–232. doi:10.1016/0304-3932(88)90030-x.
- Rebelo, Sergio (1993). "Fiscal Policy and economic growth". Journal of Monetary Economics. 32 (3): 417–458. CiteSeerX 10.1.1.363.2080. doi:10.1016/0304-3932(93)90025-b.
- Rebelo, Sergio; King, Robert G. (1999). Resuscitating real business cycles. Handbook of Macroeconomics. Vol. 1. pp. 927–1007. doi:10.1016/S1574-0048(99)10022-3. ISBN 9780444501578.
