= Greg Hess =

American businessman

Gregory D. Hess
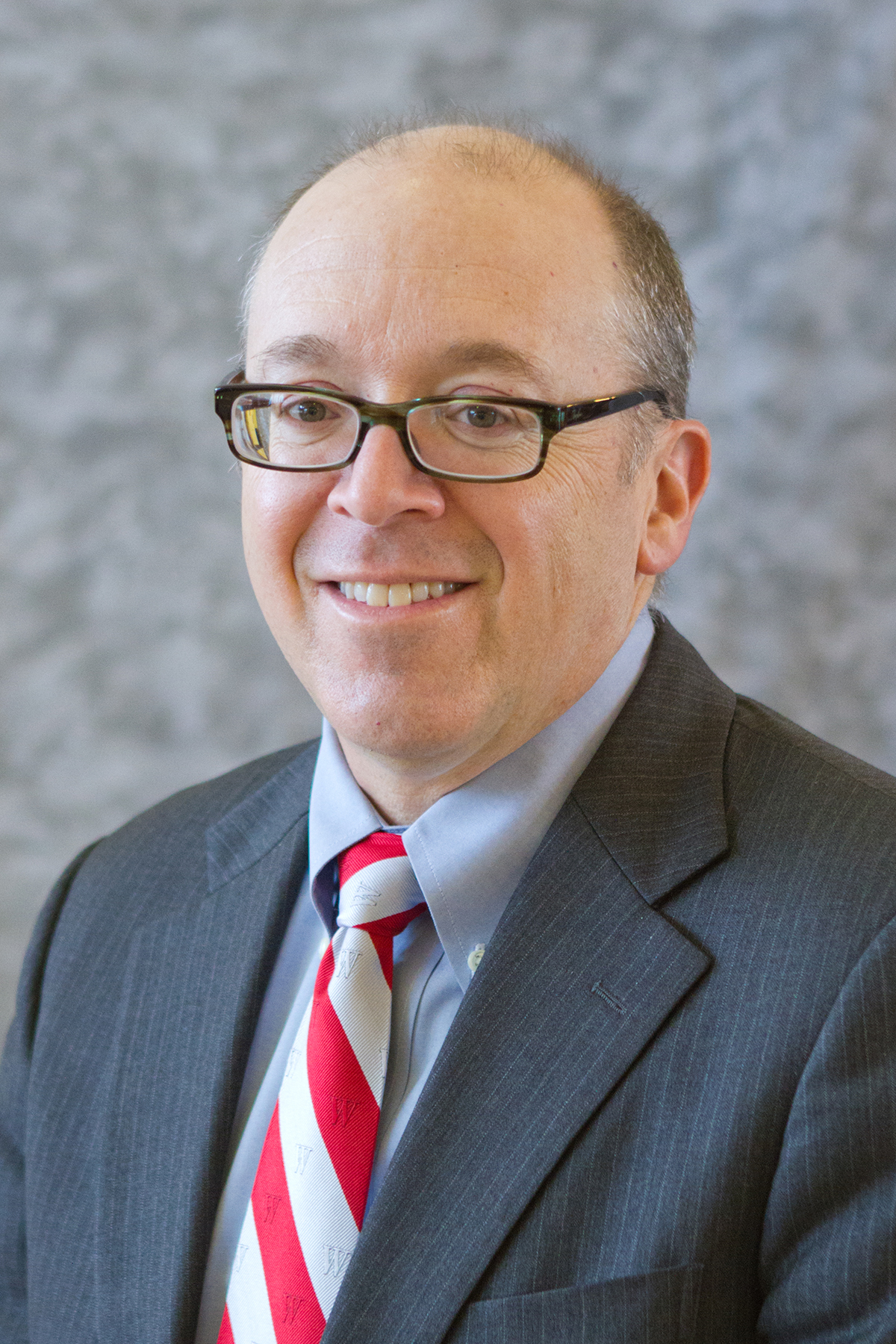
- Gregory Hess in 2014

16th President of Wabash College
- In office July 1, 2013 – July 1, 2020
- Preceded by: Patrick E. White
- Succeeded by: Scott E. Feller

Personal details
- Born: August 6, 1962 (age 64)
- Spouse: Lora Hess
- Children: Abigail Hess; Meredith Hess
- Education: University of California, Davis; Johns Hopkins University
- Website: President & CEO of IES Abroad

Gregory D. Hess (born August 6, 1962) is an American economist, business executive, and former academic administrator. Hess served as Professor of Economics, Dean of the Faculty, and Vice President of Academic Affairs at Claremont McKenna College, prior to his appointment as the 16th President of Wabash College. Hess now serves as president and CEO of IES Abroad.

== Early life and education ==
A native of San Francisco, California, Hess received an undergraduate degree at the University of California, Davis, followed by master's and doctoral degrees at Johns Hopkins University.

== Career ==
Hess served as a visiting scholar at the Federal Reserve Bank of Cleveland, and was an economist for the Federal Reserve Board of Governors in Washington, D.C. Hess was later appointed as the Dean of Faculty and Vice President for Academic Affairs at Claremont McKenna College, where he was also named James G. Boswell Professor of Economics in 2011. Hess was then installed as the 16th President of Wabash College in July 2013.

Hess serves as book review editor of the journal Macroeconomic Dynamics. He is on the editorial board of Economics & Politics. Hess served as co-editor of a book, Intranational Macroeconomics; two editions have been published. He is a member of the Shadow Open Market Committee and a fellow at the Center for Economic Studies.

=== President of Wabash College ===
On July 1, 2013, Hess was inaugurated as 16th president of the college, following the departure of Patrick E. White. In his inaugural address, Hess stated,

Our true academic mission — to liberally educate each and every student — is a timeless reminder of the lives we change here at Wabash College, one young man at a time. For while the problems facing higher education and the world are complex, the solutions need not be. Amidst the jostle and the fray and the haranguing static and noise that often surround our academic endeavor, stands our foundation: the simple gifts of the liberal arts. These profound gifts — the ability to act, to see, and to speak — are the bedrock that underpin teaching and learning at Wabash College.

Hess proposed a strategic planning process and in doing so created four new co-curricular initiatives called Liberal Arts Plus: Wabash Democracy and Public Discourse initiative, Global Health Initiative, Center for Innovation, Business, and Entrepreneurship, and Digital Arts and Human Values. Hess formalized a partnership between Wabash and Universidad Nacional Hermilio Valdizán on future health research and projects. Hess also presided over a campus master planning process intended to guide capital works projects at the college and join the Board of Directors of the Montgomery County Economic Development Council.

On November 4, 2013, Hess joined the Freedom Indiana coalition in opposition to Indiana HJR-3 with DePauw University President Brian Casey.

On September 17, 2014, Hess organized and hosted Celebrating the Liberal Arts, a national conference which highlighted the work of the Center of Inquiry in the Liberal Arts at Wabash College and the results of the Wabash National Study of Liberal Arts Education.

On March 10, 2020, Hess announced he would be stepping down as President of Wabash College at the end of the academic year. Hess's resignation followed widespread criticism from students and alumni regarding his administration's communication, particularly in light of a decision to end the 187-year practice of distributing sheepskin diplomas to college graduates. However, Hess denied the impact of these concerns in an exit interview with a student newspaper, noting:

It wasn't my job to be loved at Wabash College. It was my job to make sure that there was a place for them to love well after I had gone.

=== IES Abroad ===
In March 2020, Hess was named as the next President and CEO of IES Abroad. In his inaugural address, Hess emphasized the importance of combatting the COVID-19 pandemic, institutional racism, and nativism through the medium of studying abroad.

== Publications ==
- Saku Aura and Gregory Hess (2010). "What's in a Name?". Economic Inquiry. 48 (1): 214–227. doi:10.1111/j.1465-7295.2008.00171.x. S2CID 219386265.
- Michelle Bligh and Gregory Hess (2013). Deconstructing Alan : a quantitative assessment of the qualitative aspects of Chairman Greenspan's communication (1st ed.). Cambridge, Massachusetts: The MIT Press. ISBN 978-0-262-01893-7.
- Michelle Bligh and Gregory Hess (2007). "The power of leading subtly: Alan Greenspan, rhetorical leadership, and monetary policy". The Leadership Quarterly. 18 (2): 87–104. doi:10.1016/j.leaqua.2007.01.001.
- S. Brock Blomberg and Gregory Hess (1997). "Politics and exchange rate forecasts". Journal of International Economics. 43 (1/2): 189–205. doi:10.1016/S0022-1996(96)01466-3.
- S. Brock Blomberg and Gregory Hess (2012). "The Economic Welfare Cost of Conflict: An Empirical Assessment" (PDF). The Oxford Handbook of the Economics of Peace and Conflict. doi:10.1093/oxfordhb/9780195392777.013.0018. hdl:10419/76398. S2CID 16231488.
- Allan Brunner and Gregory Hess (1993). "Are higher levels of inflation less predictable? A state-dependent conditional heteroskedasticity approach". The Journal of Business and Economic Statistics. 11 (2): 187–197. doi:10.1080/07350015.1993.10509947.
- Gregory Hess (2009). Guns and Butter: The Economic Causes and Consequences of Conflict (1st ed.). Cambridge, Massachusetts: The MIT Press. ISBN 978-0-262-01281-2.
- Gregory Hess (2004). "Marriage and Consumption Insurance: What's Love Got to Do with It?" (PDF). Journal of Political Economy. 112 (2): 290–318. doi:10.1086/381477. hdl:10419/31406. JSTOR 10.1086/381477. S2CID 18191032.
- Gregory Hess and Eric van Wincoop (2012). Intranational macroeconomics (1st ed.). Cambridge University Press. ISBN 978-1-107-40379-6.
- Gregory Hess and Shigeru Iwata (1997). "Asymmetric persistence in GDP? A deeper look at depth". Journal of Monetary Economics. 40 (3): 535–554. doi:10.1016/S0304-3932(97)00057-3.
- Gregory Hess and Athanasios Orphanides (2001). "War and Democracy". Journal of Political Economy. 109 (4): 776–810. doi:10.1086/322085. JSTOR 10.1086/322085. S2CID 7156301.
- Gregory Hess and Athanasios Orphanides (1995). "War Politics: An Economic, Rational-Voter Framework". The American Economic Review. 85 (4): 828–846. JSTOR 2118234.
- Gregory Hess and Kwanho Shin (1998). "Intranational business cycles in the United States". Journal of International Economics. 44 (2): 289–313. doi:10.1016/S0022-1996(97)00032-9.
- Gregory Hess and Kwanho Shin (2000). "Risk sharing by households within and across regions and industries". Journal of Monetary Economics. 45 (3): 533–560. doi:10.1016/S0304-3932(00)00007-6.
