= Allan H. Meltzer =

American economist (1928–2017)

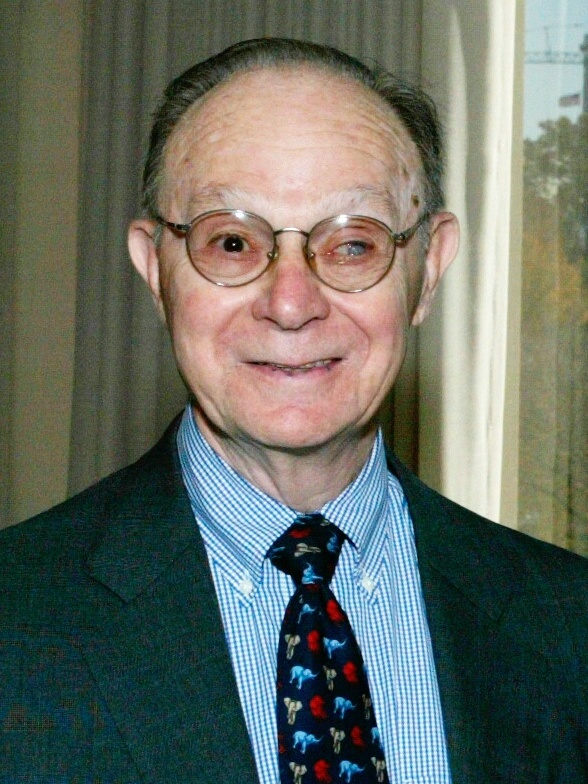
- Meltzer in 2003
- Born: February 6, 1928; Boston, Massachusetts
- Died: May 8, 2017 (aged 89); Pittsburgh, Pennsylvania

Academic background
- Education: Duke University (BA, MA); UCLA (PhD)
- Influences: Karl Brunner; Milton Friedman

Academic work
- Discipline: Economist
- School or tradition: Monetarism
- Institutions: Carnegie Mellon University
- Website: Information at IDEAS / RePEc

Allan H. Meltzer (/ˈmɛltsər/; February 6, 1928 – May 8, 2017) was an American economist and Allan H. Meltzer Professor of Political Economy at Carnegie Mellon University's Tepper School of Business and Institute for Politics and Strategy in Pittsburgh, Pennsylvania. Meltzer specialized on studying monetary policy and the Federal Reserve System, and authored several academic papers and books on the development and applications of monetary policy, and about the history of central banking in the United States.

Together with Karl Brunner, Meltzer created the Shadow Open Market Committee, a monetarist council that deeply criticized the Federal Open Market Committee. Meltzer originated the aphorism "Capitalism without failure is like religion without sin. It doesn't work", that is, guarding companies from failure "removes the dynamic process that makes stockholders responsible for losses and disciplines managers who make mistakes."

== Career ==
Meltzer was born in 1928 Boston, Massachusetts. He received his A.B. and M.A. degrees from Duke University in 1948 and 1955, respectively. He earned his Ph.D. degree from UCLA in 1958 under supervision of Karl Brunner. He became an associate professor at Carnegie Mellon the following year. From 1973 to 1999, Meltzer served as the Chair of the Shadow Open Market Committee, a group of economists, academics, and bankers that met to critique the actions of the Federal Reserve's Federal Open Market Committee. He served as an Acting Member of the Council of Economic Advisors in 1988–1989 at the end of the Ronald Reagan administration. He was a visiting scholar at the American Enterprise Institute. Meltzer was the first ever recipient of the AEI's Irving Kristol award in 2003. He was honored at the award dinner by President George W. Bush, who remarked, "I know I'm not the featured speaker; I'm just a warm-up act for Allan Meltzer."

Meltzer was the Chairman of the Congressionally mandated International Financial Institution Advisory Commission, known as the Meltzer Commission. The commission's majority report (2000) proposed changes to the operations of the International Monetary Fund and especially to those of the World Bank, which the majority recommended should withdraw from lending to "middle income countries". The report's recommendations were not adopted by subsequent U.S. administrations of either party. Four out of the five Commission members nominated by the then-minority Congressional Democrats filed a dissent from the majority's recommendations (Fred Bergsten, Richard Huber, Jerome Levinson, and Esteban Torres), although one of the four (Huber) both voted for the majority report and joined the dissent. The official vote tally in favor was thus recorded as 8 to 3. Controversy over the majority's arguments and recommendations continued after the report's publication: critics, including David de Ferranti, a former vice president at the World Bank, argued inter alia that the majority's report reflected ideological preconceptions rather than any demonstrated understanding of how the World Bank actually works, including the extensive complementarities between World Bank programs and private sector investment in developing countries. The commission's report is defended by Meltzer's chief advisor Adam Lerrick and critiqued by de Ferranti in their respective chapters in an edited volume published by the Center for Global Development and fully accessible on the web.

Meltzer was critical of the Federal Reserve's decision to rescue the leading bond-insurer AIG when it did so in 2008, and said that "these disasters should be headed off early, or should be left to the marketplace to settle." In turn, the Fed's decision not to rescue Lehman Brothers was one that at the time Meltzer appeared to applaud. Contrasting it with the AIG rescue, he commented: "I would say we ought to look at Lehman Brothers. They let Lehman Brothers fail. Within a few days, just a few days, Barclays was there buying up some of Lehman's assets..." A year later, Meltzer expressed a more critical view of the Fed's handling of the Lehman case. He said, "After 30 years of bailing out almost all large financial firms, the Fed made the horrendous mistake of changing its policy in the midst of a recession... Allowing Lehman to fail without warning is one of the worst blunders in Federal Reserve history..."

In May 2009, Meltzer warned that "the enormous increase in bank reserves—caused by the Fed’s purchases of bonds and mortgages—will surely bring on severe inflation if allowed to remain." Four years after Meltzer's comment, with the Fed's quantitative easing program still continuing, US inflation as measured by the consumer price index (CPI-U) was running at a year-on-year rate of 1.4%, while expected inflation over a 10-year period, as estimated by the Cleveland Federal Reserve, was running at around 1.6%. Meltzer's argument that nobody had expected the lack of inflation has been challenged by Paul Krugman. Meltzer's study A History of the Federal Reserve is considered the most comprehensive history of the central bank. Volume I covers the years from the creation of the Fed in 1913 until the 1951 Accord with the Treasury in 1951. Volume II Book 1 covers the years from the accord in 1951 until 1969, and Volume II Book 2 discusses the period from 1970 until the end of the Great Inflation in the mid-1980s. Meltzer served as president of the Mont Pelerin Society for the 2012–2014 term. Meltzer has opposed adoption of a "cap and trade" scheme for carbon emissions, designed to help combat global climate change.

== Publications ==
- Allan H. Meltzer and Scott F. Richard (1981). "A Rational Theory of the Size of Government". Journal of Political Economy, 89(5), pp. 914–927. Abstract.
- Karl Brunner and Allan H. Meltzer (1993). Money and the Economy: Issues in Monetary Analysis, Cambridge. Description and chapter previews, pp. ix–x.
- "Major works before 1997". Archived from the original on September 3, 2000. , including his work with Swiss economist Karl Brunner.
- _____ (2001). A History of the Federal Reserve, Volume 1: 1913–1951, ISBN 978-0226520001 Description.
- _____ (July 2003). "What Future for the IMF and the World Bank?", Quarterly International Economics Report, "What Future for the IMF and the World Bank?" (PDF). Archived (PDF) from the original on December 25, 2003. .
- _____ (2006)."An Appreciation: Milton Friedman, 1912–2006," On the Issues, AEI Online.
- _____ (2009) A History of the Federal Reserve, Volume 2, Book 1, 1951–1969, ISBN 978-0226520018
- _____ (2009) A History of the Federal Reserve, Volume 2, Book 2, 1970–1985, ISBN 978-0226519944
- _____ (2012) Why Capitalism?, Oxford. ISBN 978-0199859573. See also the author's writeup of the book.
