= Marvin Goodfriend =

American economist (1950–2019)

- Born: Marvin Seth Goodfriend; November 6, 1950; New York City, New York, U.S.
- Died: December 5, 2019 (aged 69); Pittsburgh, Pennsylvania, U.S.
- Education: Union College (BA); Brown University (MA, PhD)
- Political party: Republican

Marvin Seth Goodfriend (November 6, 1950 – December 5, 2019) was an American economist. He held the Allan H. Meltzer Professorship in economics at Carnegie Mellon University; he was previously the director of research at the Federal Reserve Bank of Richmond. Following his 2017 nomination to the Federal Reserve Board of Governors, the White House decided to forgo renominating Goodfriend at the beginning of the new term.

== Education ==
Goodfriend received a bachelor's degree in mathematics from Union College in 1972 before earning an M.A. (1977) and Ph.D. (1980) in economics from Brown University.

== Career ==
From 2005 until his death, Goodfriend served as the Friends of Allan H. Meltzer Professor of Economics at Carnegie Mellon's Tepper School of Business. His teaching and research interests include macroeconomic fluctuations, monetary theory and policy, banking and financial markets, and economic development. Prior to his teaching career, from 1993 to 2005 he was director of research and policy advisor at the Federal Reserve Bank of Richmond. In this capacity, he regularly attended meetings of the Federal Open Market Committee at the Board of Governors of the Federal Reserve System in Washington, D.C. from 1993 to 2005.

Before that, he was an economic advisor at the White House in 1984 and 1985.

Goodfriend was frequently engaged with central banks such as the European Central Bank, Norges Bank, the Sveriges Riksbank, and the Swiss National Bank, and has been a visiting scholar at several of them. He was also engaged in teaching activities on monetary theory and policy in China, Germany, Japan, South Korea, and Switzerland.

In November 2017, Goodfriend was nominated by President Donald Trump to fill one of the vacancies on the Federal Reserve Board of Governors.

== Fiscal policy positions ==
Goodfriend has been described as conservative and was skeptical of monetary policy instruments that were employed by the Federal Reserve under Janet Yellen. He was a critic of an actively regulating role of the Fed and has repeatedly argued against the current form of quantitative easing as well as bond buying programs, especially the purchases of mortgage-backed securities.

In 2008, Goodfriend warned that the Federal Reserve's actions would cause higher inflation; a prediction that never materialized. Asked at a Senate confirmation hearing for a seat on the Federal Reserve's board of governors in January 2018 why he got his prediction wrong, Goodfriend did not give an explanation and instead spoke of the value of low inflation.

Goodfriend agreed with Yellen regarding the aim of shrinking the Fed's $4.5-trillion balance sheet, much of which it acquired through bond buying programs. He supported a rules based monetary policy, which would limit the freedom of action of the Federal Reserve bank in favor of a more mathematically based approach. He had also been willing to consider unusual monetary instruments in times of crisis, such as negative rates as used by the Bank of Japan, European Central Bank, and other institutions in Europe.

On March 16, 2017, Goodfriend testified before the Subcommittee on Monetary Policy and Trade of the U.S. House of Representatives' Committee on Financial Services. His testimony was titled "The Fed Needs a Credible Commitment to Price Stability". He argued that the current commitment to price stability of the Fed lacks reliability.

Goodfriend made a number of significant contributions to an understanding of monetary policy. In a 1986 publication, he criticized Federal Reserve System secrecy. In 1994, the FOMC did begin to release publicly after its meetings its funds rate target. Goodfriend contributed to an understanding of the evolution of the monetary standard. He invented the term "inflation scare" to describe how the FOMC responded to discrete rises in bond rates as a sign that inflationary expectations were unanchored. He documented the change in FOMC procedures that occurred with the Volcker disinflation. He insisted that the Fed distinguish sharply between monetary policy (the control of money and bank reserves) and credit policy (the allocation of credit). He made an early case for a Fed inflation target. He exposited the New Keynesian model in a way that demonstrated the desirability of a price level target. He also pioneered the idea of central banks imposing a negative interest rate on bank reserves to overcome the problem of the zero lower bound.

== Memberships ==
Goodfriend was a member of the Shadow Open Market Committee, an independent group of economists who strive for a new way of thinking about monetary politics.

Goodfriend was co-editor with Stan Zin of the Carnegie Rochester Conference Series on Public Policy and has served on the editorial boards of the Journal of Money, Credit, and Banking, the International Journal of Central Banking, and the Journal of Monetary Economics.

== Death and legacy ==
Goodfriend died at his home in Pittsburgh on December 5, 2019, aged 69.

A collection of essays, Marvin Goodfriend: Economist and Central Banker was published in 2022 by the Federal Reserve Bank of Richmond, with a selection of Goodfriend's diverse policy ideas and research contributions.
