= Stephen Haber =

American historian and political scientist

Stephen H. Haber (born July 12, 1957) is an American political scientist and historian known for his research on political institutions and economic policies that promote innovation and improvements in living standards. Haber is the A. A. and Jeanne Welch Milligan Professor in the School of Humanities and Sciences at Stanford University, the Peter and Helen Bing Senior Fellow at the Hoover Institution, and senior fellow at the Stanford Institute for Economic Policy Research.

== Education and career ==
Haber received his B.A. degree from the George Washington University in 1979, his M.A. from UCLA in 1981, and his Ph.D. degree from UCLA in 1985. Following the receipt of his Ph.D., he began work as an assistant professor at Columbia University in 1985.

In 1987, Haber became an assistant professor at Stanford University. He was appointed the Peter and Helen Bing Senior Fellow at the Hoover Institution in 2001 and the A. A. and Jeanne Welch Milligan Professor in the School of Humanities and Sciences in 2003. From 1995 to 1998 he served as the Associate Dean for the Social Sciences and Director of Graduate Studies in the School of Humanities and Sciences and from 1997 to 2011 he served as the Director of the Social Science History Program. He founded and directed the Hoover Institution Working Group on Intellectual Property, Innovation, and Prosperity, which ran from 2014 to 2019. He codirects the Hoover Institution Working Group on the Foundations of Long-Run Prosperity.

Haber is among Stanford's most distinguished teachers. He has been awarded the Dean's Award for Distinguished Teaching (twice, in 1991 and again in 2002), the Allan V. Cox Medal for Faculty Excellence in Fostering Undergraduate Research, the Phi Beta Kappa Teaching Prize, the Walter J. Gores Award for Excellence in Teaching, and the Lloyd W. Dinkelspiel Award for Outstanding Service to Undergraduate Education. Haber's abilities as a teacher and mentor were acknowledged by the Economic History Association, which at its 2013 meeting awarded him the Jonathan R. Hughes Prize for Excellence in Teaching.

== Work ==
Haber has spent his academic life investigating why only some societies have been able to create economic and political systems that foster innovation, social mobility, and high standards of living.

One line of Haber's work has focused on how regulatory agencies that supervise financial and patent systems are often used by incumbent firms and interest groups to stifle competition, thereby curtailing economic opportunities and slowing technological progress. His recent books on these topics include Fragile by Design: The Political Origins of Banking Crises and Scarce Credit (coauthored with Charles Calomiris) and The Battle Over Patents: History and Politics of Innovation (coedited with Naomi Lamoreaux).

Haber's current work focuses on the impact of geography on the evolution of societies' fundamental economic and political institutions. His research in this area has been featured in the mainstream press.

== Books ==
- Fragile By Design: The Political Origins of Banking Crises and Scarce Credit (with Charles W. Calomiris). Princeton University Press, 2014.
- Los Buenos Tiempos son Estos: Los Efectos de la Incursión de la Banca Extranjera en México después de un Siglo de Crisis Bancarias (with Aldo Musacchio). Centro de Estudios Espinosa Yglesias, 2014.
- Mexico Since 1980 (with Herbert S. Klein, Noel Maurer, and Kevin J. Middlebrook). Cambridge University Press, 2008.
- The Politics of Property Rights: Political Instability, Credible Commitments, and Economic Growth in Mexico, 1876–1929 (with Armando Razo and Noel Maurer). Cambridge University Press, Political Economy of Institutions and Decisions Series, 2003.
- Industry and Underdevelopment: The Industrialization of Mexico, 1890–1940. Stanford University Press, 1989.
