= Marianne Baxter =

Economist

- Occupation: Economist

Academic background
- Education: Professor

Academic work
- Institutions: University of Boston

Marianne Baxter is a professor of economics at Boston University.

== Education ==
She obtained her PhD from the University of Chicago and a bachelor's degree from the University of Rochester. She is a research associate at the NBER. She is the 412th most cited economist in the world according to IDEAS.

== Academic career ==
She started as a lecturer at the University of Chicago from 1980 to 1982, and was then assistant professor at the University of California at Santa Barbara and the University of Rochester. She then became associate professor at the University of Virginia between 1993 and 1995 before being promoted to full professor in 1995. In 2000, she became professor at Boston University. In 2002–2003, she was a visiting professor at Harvard University.

== Research ==
Her research looks into International Economics, Macroeconomics and International Finance. Her works have been cited over 13000 times. Her research has been published in the American Economic Review, The Review of Economics and Statistics and the Journal of Monetary Economics.

Her research has been quoted in the Investors Chronicle, Atlantico and the Daily Free Press.

== Selected bibliography ==
- Baxter, Marianne; Kouparitsas, Michael A. (2003). "Trade Structure, Industrial Structure, and International Business Cycles". American Economic Review. 93 (2): 51–56.
- Baxter, Marianne; Jermann, Urban J. (1999). "Household Production and the Excess Sensitivity of Consumption to Current Income". American Economic Review. 89 (4): 902–920.
- Baxter, Marianne; King, Robert G. (1999-11-01). "Measuring Business Cycles: Approximate Band-Pass Filters for Economic Time Series". The Review of Economics and Statistics. 81 (4): 575–593.
