= International Financial Institution Advisory Commission =

U.S. Congress commission

The International Financial Institution Advisory Commission, also known as the Meltzer Commission, named for its chair, Professor Allan Meltzer, was established by the United States Congress in November 1998 "to recommend future US policy toward several multilateral institutions: the International Monetary Fund, the World Bank Group, the regional development banks such as the Inter-American Development Bank, the Bank for International Settlements, and the WTO", as part of legislation authorizing $18 billion of U.S. funding for the IMF. The majority report recommended changes to the IMF and World Bank which were then criticized by a number of commentators inside and outside the U.S. The report's recommendations were not adopted by subsequent U.S. administrations of either party.

== Majority report ==
The Commission's majority report proposed changes to the operations of the International Monetary Fund and especially to those of the World Bank, which the majority recommended should withdraw from lending to so-called "middle income countries". Four out of the five Commission members nominated by the then-minority Congressional Democrats filed a dissent from the majority's recommendations (Fred Bergsten, Richard Huber, Jerome Levinson, and Esteban Torres), although one of the four (Huber) both voted for the majority report and joined the dissent. The official vote tally in favor was thus recorded as 8 to 3.

== Challenges ==
Controversy over the majority's arguments and recommendations continued after the report's publication. Critics, including David de Ferranti, a former Vice President at the World Bank, argued inter alia that the majority report reflected ideological preconceptions rather than any demonstrated understanding of how the World Bank actually works, including the extensive complementarities between World Bank programs and private sector investment in developing countries. The majority's core recommendations are defended by Chairman Meltzer's chief advisor Adam Lerrick and critiqued by de Ferranti in their respective chapters in an edited volume published by the Center for Global Development and fully accessible on the web.

== A different viewpoint ==
An alternative perspective is offered by Susanne Soederberg, Associate Professor, Development Studies, Queen's University (Ontario): "The Meltzer Commission drew public attention to the shortcomings of the IFIs but also heightened the legitimacy crisis of neoliberal restructuring of the global South, especially in HIPCs. For instance, the commission charged the IMF with giving too little attention to improving financial structures in developing countries and too much to expensive rescue operations."

== Outcome ==
The report's recommendations were not, in the event, adopted by subsequent U.S. administrations of either party.
