= Adam Lerrick =

American economist and government official

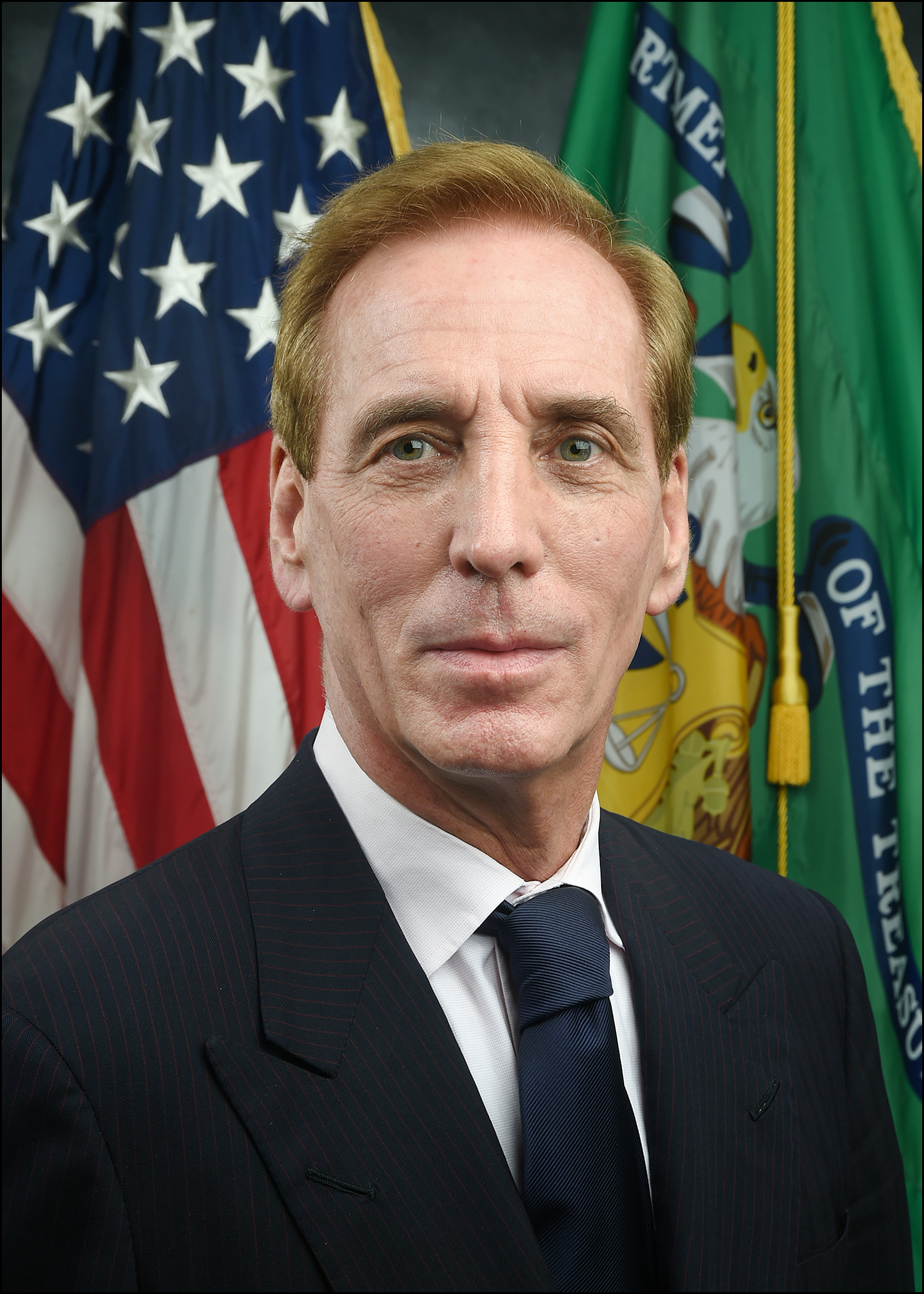

Counselor to the Secretary of the Treasury
- Incumbent
- Assumed office June 2019

Personal details
- Education: Princeton University (B.A.); Massachusetts Institute of Technology (Ph.D.)
- Occupation: Economist

Adam Lerrick is an American economist and politician who served as Counselor to the Secretary of the Treasury, and was previously Donald Trump's nominee for Assistant Secretary of the Treasury for International Finance. Lerrick is also an economist at the American Enterprise Institute.

== Education ==
Lerrick received his Bachelor of Arts in economics from Princeton University. He graduated summa cum laude and with Phi Beta Kappa honors. He was also awarded a Doctor of Philosophy from the Massachusetts Institute of Technology in economics and was an Institute Scholar there.

== Career ==
Lerrick was Advisor on International Economic Policy to the Majority Leader of the House of Representatives of the U.S. Congress from 2001 to 2003. He was also Advisor on International Economic Policy to the Congressional Joint Economic Committee from 2001 to 2007 and the senior adviser to the chairman of the International Financial Institution Advisory Commission, which focused its efforts on the International Monetary Fund and the World Bank.

In 2004, Lerrick acted as leader of the negotiations team of the individual bondholders in the Argentine debt restructuring negotiations regarding a default by Argentina on its $110 billion debt held by the IMF. Lerrick is credited with devising a plan to provide representation of those individual bondholders in the face of concern that retail investors would be partial the IMF and its large institutional investors.

Lerrick was an emeritus professor at Carnegie Mellon University, where he also held the position of the "Friends of Allan H. Meltzer Chair in Economics" from 2001 to 2010.

On March 14, 2017, Donald Trump announced his intent to nominate Lerrick for Assistant Secretary of the Treasury for International Finance. Once confirmed, Lerrick was expected to report to David Malpass, who is the Under Secretary for International Affairs in the United States Department of the Treasury. On May 10, 2018, President Trump withdrew Lerrick's nomination over concerns regarding his financial disclosures, specifically special purpose vehicles set up by Lerrick in Ireland to hold the restructured bonds of Argentina.

From September 2018 to May 2019, Lerrick served as Acting United States Executive Director of the International Monetary Fund. In June 2019, he was appointed as Counselor to the Secretary of the Treasury.

== Policy positions ==
Lerrick has been called a "creative thinker in the world of sovereign debt crises," particularly in connection with his criticism of government bailouts by the IMF. Starting in the late 1990s, he became a critic of the IMF's handling of currency runs in Southeast Asian countries, also writing a paper arguing that U.S. taxpayer funds could be saved if the IMF were able to rely on international bond market funds instead of looking only to major nation creditors, such as the United States.

== Works ==
=== Research publications ===
- Lerrick, A. and Meltzer, A.H., 2003. Blueprint for an international lender of last resort. Journal of Monetary Economics, 50(1), pp. 289–303.
- Lerrick, A. and Meltzer, A.H., 2001. Beyond IMF bailouts: Default without disruption. Quarterly International Economics Report.
- Lerrick, A. and Meltzer, A., 2002. Grants: A better way to deliver aid. Quarterly International Economics Report, 1.
- Lerrick, A. and Meltzer, A.H., 2002. Sovereign Default: The Private Sector Can Resolve Bankruptcy without a Formal Court. Quarterly International Economics Report.
- Lerrick, A., 2005. Aid to Africa at risk: Covering up corruption. International Economics Report.
- Lerrick, A., 2003. Funding the IMF: How Much Does It Really Cost. Quarterly International Economics Report.

=== Books ===
- Lerrick, A., 1999. Private Sector Financing for the IMF: Now Part of an Optimal Funding Mix. Washington, DC: Bretton Woods Committee.
