= James B. Bullard =

Federal Reserve Bank president (born 1961)

Jim Bullard
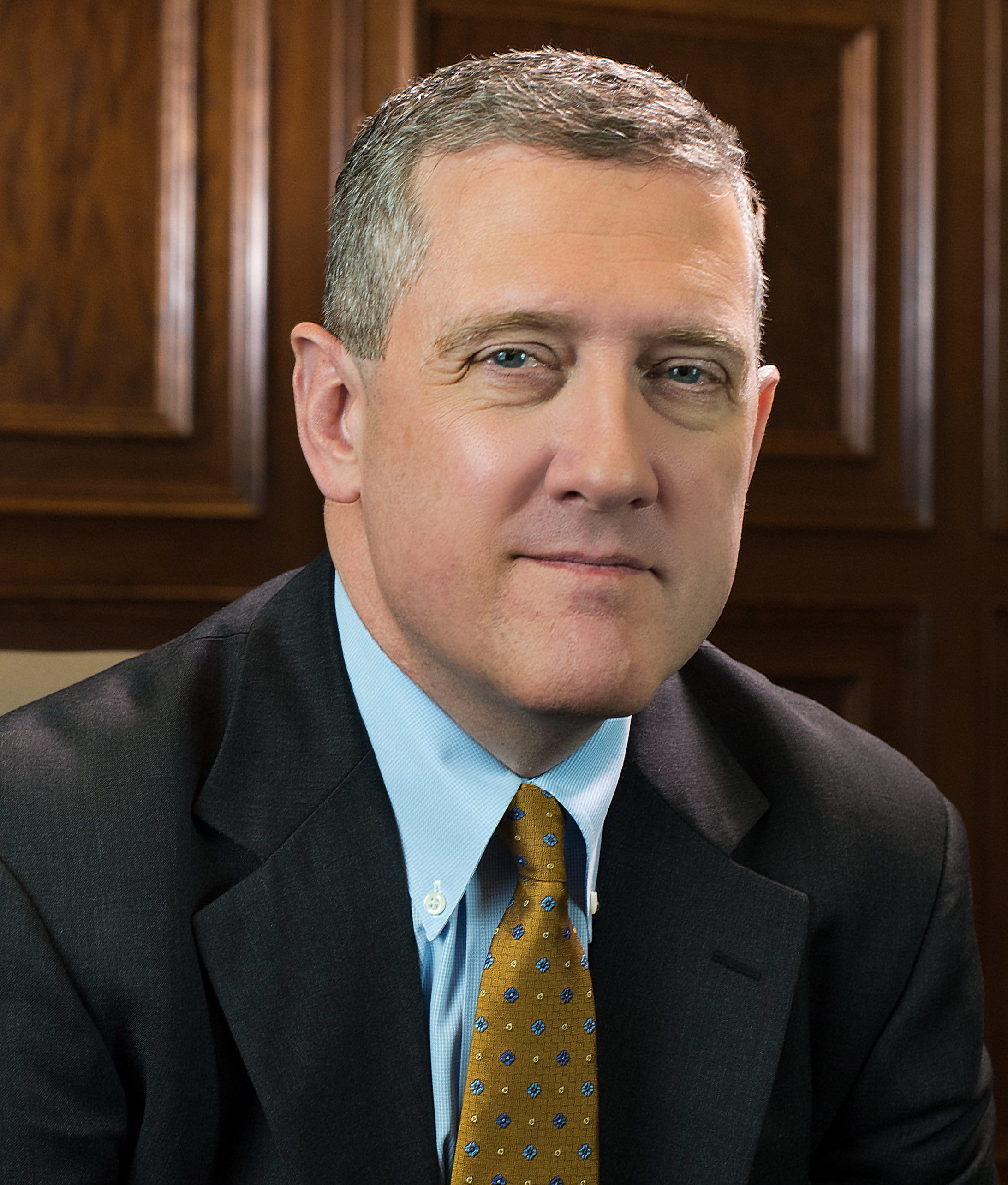

President of the Federal Reserve Bank of St. Louis
- In office April 1, 2008 – August 14, 2023
- Preceded by: William Poole
- Succeeded by: Alberto Musalem

Personal details
- Born: James Brian Bullard; February 28, 1961 (age 65) Columbus, Wisconsin, U.S.
- Spouse: Jane Callahan
- Children: 2
- Education: St. Cloud State University (BA); Indiana University, Bloomington (MA, PhD)

James Brian Bullard (born February 28, 1961) is an American economist who served as the chief executive officer and 12th president of the Federal Reserve Bank of St. Louis, a position he held from 2008 until August 14, 2023. In July 2023, he was named dean of the Mitch Daniels School of Business at Purdue University.

== Early life and education ==
Bullard was born in Columbus, Wisconsin, and grew up in Forest Lake, Minnesota. He received bachelor's degrees in economics and in quantitative methods and information systems from St. Cloud State University in 1984 and a Ph.D. in economics from Indiana University in 1990.

== Career ==
Bullard began his career as an academic economist and monetary policy scholar. His research has appeared in numerous professional journals, including the American Economic Review, the Journal of Monetary Economics, Macroeconomic Dynamics and the Journal of Money, Credit and Banking.

=== Federal Reserve Bank of St Louis ===
Serving 15 years as the sitting president and chief executive officer of the Federal Reserve Bank of St. Louis, Bullard earned praise and accolades for his leadership as part of the Federal Open Market Committee (FOMC) in guiding the direction of U.S. monetary policy. A noted economist and scholar, Bullard had been the longest-serving Federal Reserve Bank president in the country and ranked as the seventh-most influential economist in the world in 2014. His scholarly impact has been based on research-based thinking and intellectual openness to new theories and explanations. That allowed Bullard to be an early voice for economic change, helping the Federal Reserve navigate complex economic landscapes such as the COVID-19 pandemic and the financial crisis during his tenure.

Before becoming president in 2008, Bullard served in various roles at the Federal Reserve Bank of St. Louis, starting in 1990 as an economist in the research division and later serving as vice president and deputy director of research for monetary analysis. For 15 years, he directed the activities of the Federal Reserve's Eighth District, which branches into several states, including an extensive portion of southern Indiana. While serving on the Federal Reserve's Open Market Committee, Macroeconomic Advisers named Bullard the FOMC's second biggest mover of markets in 2010 behind Chairman Ben Bernanke and the biggest mover of markets in 2011 and 2013.

=== Other ===
Bullard served as an honorary professor of economics at Washington University in St. Louis, where he also sat on the advisory council of the economics department as well as several advisory boards. The St. Louis Post-Dispatch named him the Top Workplace Leader among the region's large employers as part of its 2018 Top Workplace Awards. Active in the community, Bullard has served on the board of directors of Concordance Academy of Leadership in St. Louis and was formerly the board chair of the United Way U.S.A. He is coeditor of the Journal of Economic Dynamics and Control, a member of the editorial advisory board of the National Institute Economic Review and a member of the Central Bank Research Association's senior council.

== Financial media accolades and appearances ==
In February 2011, Bullard was named in a Bloomberg.com article as "a bellwether person," an "indicator of where the full committee (of the FOMC) is heading." Macroeconomic Advisers named Bullard the FOMC's second biggest mover of markets in 2010 behind Fed Chairman Ben Bernanke and the biggest mover of markets in 2011 and 2013. Macroeconomic Advisers noted that, in 2011, his speeches and interviews moved the two-year Treasury yield by almost 17 basis points and, in 2013, he moved the 10-year yield by 29 basis points on a cumulative basis. Since 2010, Bullard has appeared numerous times as a host and commentator on CNBC, CNN, Bloomberg Television, BNN and Fox Business, among other media outlets.

== Public positions ==
=== New approach to projections ===
In 2016, Bullard announced a new approach for the St. Louis Fed's near-term U.S. macroeconomic and monetary policy projections. The new approach is based on the idea that the economy may experience one of several possible persistent regimes, which involve a combination of recession or no recession, high or low productivity growth, and high or low real returns on short-term government debt. While switches between regimes are possible, they are difficult to forecast. This contrasts with the more traditional approach to monetary policy projections, which assumes that the economy will converge to one single, long-run steady state.

In the statement released June 17, 2016, Bullard said the current regime is characterized by low productivity growth, low real returns on short-term government debt and no recession. "Policy is regime dependent, leading to a recommended policy rate path which is essentially flat over the forecast horizon," he said, where the forecast horizon is two to three years.

He explained the need for a new approach in a speech on June 30, 2016. Given that the cyclical dynamics that resulted from the recession appeared to be over, Bullard said: "It no longer made sense to submit a forecast of output growing above trend, unemployment continuing to decline, inflation rising above target, and the policy rate increasing at a fairly steep pace. We needed to rethink our approach to forecasting."

=== Deflationary danger ===
In November 2009, Bullard opined that the central bank should extend its mortgage-backed securities buying program beyond its expiration date in March 2010, which would (according to the New York Times) keep interest rates low and help keep the dollar weak.

During the summer of 2010, Bullard warned that the U.S. economy was at risk of becoming "enmeshed in a Japanese-style deflationary outcome within the next several years," a view he presented in his research paper, "Seven Faces of 'The Peril.'" According to the New York Times, Bullard "had been viewed as a centrist and associated with the camp that sees inflation, the Fed's traditional enemy, as a greater threat than deflation," along with Charles I. Plosser, then-president of the Philadelphia Fed; Richard W. Fisher, then-president of the Dallas Fed; and Thomas M. Hoenig, then-president of the Kansas City Fed. Laurence H. Meyer, a former Fed governor, said Bullard's new position was "very significant .... He has been one of the most hawkish members." More concerned with the risk of deflation (i.e. less hawkish) were Eric S. Rosengren, Boston Fed; Janet L. Yellen then-president of the San Francisco Fed and former chair of the Federal Reserve; and William C. Dudley, New York Fed.

In his "Seven Faces" paper, Bullard argued it may not be prudent to rely on a near-zero policy rate alone to keep the U.S. out of the deflationary outcome; he recommended that current interest rate policy be supplemented with additional quantitative easing, an unconventional monetary policy tool.

=== Quantitative easing ===
The Federal Reserve engaged in two large-scale asset purchase programs between 2009 and 2011, commonly referred to as the first and second rounds of quantitative easing, or QE1 and QE2. Both programs had detractors, including those who likened the policy to "printing money." Other economists said that QE2 either had no effect on the economy or was counterproductive. However, after QE2 ended in June 2011, Bullard said that QE2 worked and it "demonstrated that the Fed can conduct an effective monetary stabilization policy even when policy rates (the federal funds rate) are near zero." Responding to Bullard's assertion, David Nicklaus of the St. Louis Post-Dispatch wrote, "The problem for the Fed, of course, is that neither QE1 nor QE2 has yet brought about a vigorous economic recovery ... Bullard and other Fed policymakers may be convinced that they have a powerful new tool at their disposal, but they still need to persuade the public that it works."

Bullard argued that while the effects of QE2 on the financial markets occurred during the run-up to the FOMC's decision to pursue the program, policymakers expected the effects on the real economy (e.g., consumption and employment) to occur between six and 18 months after the policy action—which happens with conventional monetary policy as well; but then analysts may have difficulty determining exactly which movements in real variables are due to monetary policy and which ones are due to other influences on the economy that occur in the meantime, he said. "Disentangling these effects is a standard problem in monetary policy analysis," he said, adding that "the real effects of the asset-purchase program will most likely be conventional, just as the financial market effects were."

While Bullard has supported the Fed's use of quantitative easing, he argues that it is rarely optimal for the Fed to use the "shock and awe" approach to this policy, wherein the Fed announces a large purchase with a predetermined purchase size and fixed duration like QE2. Rather, he has stated he favors a "state-contingent" policy path similar to how the FOMC adjusts the federal funds rate on a meeting-by-meeting basis: "Any policy path should be reviewed carefully and seriously at each meeting for possible adjustment given the incoming data."

In the wake of QE2, Bullard maintained that even with the policy rate near-zero, the Fed still has tools to combat economic weakness. He called the central bank's balance sheet policy "the most natural and effective tool for this purpose." However, Bullard, along with then-president of the Dallas Fed Richard Fisher, disagreed with affixing a calendar date to policy. According to Reuters, "Bullard and Fisher do not represent the consensus view championed by Fed Chairman Ben Bernanke, who has strongly hinted at the possibility of further action. But they do remind investors that the central bank will not be united if it decides to delve even further into the realm of unconventional monetary policy."

In February 2012, Bullard told Reuters that a third round of quantitative easing would only be necessary if the U.S. economy deteriorates and inflation drops, adding that the U.S. economy was not in such a situation. On Sept. 13, 2012, the FOMC announced the third round of bond-buying, dubbed QE3. Bullard, who was not a voting member of the FOMC at that time, told financial media that he would have voted against QE3: "I would have voted against it based on the timing. I didn't feel like we had a good enough case to make a major move at this juncture," Bullard told Reuters.

At the June 18–19, 2013 FOMC meeting, in which the committee authorized then-Fed Chairman Ben Bernanke to discuss an approximate timeline for winding down its quantitative easing program, Bullard dissented for the first time in his tenure as president of the St. Louis Fed. He said the committee "should have more strongly signaled its willingness to defend its inflation target of 2 percent in light of recent low inflation readings." He also again signaled his preference for a state-contingent monetary policy, rather than a calendar-based approach, noting that the announcement of an approximate timeline for tapering "was a step away from state-contingent monetary policy."

=== Inflation concerns ===
Bullard has argued that the Fed should focus on headline inflation and deemphasize core inflation, which has been a long-standing issue for the FOMC. In a May 2011 speech to the Money Marketeers Club in New York City, Bullard said that, "Many of the old arguments in favor of a focus on core inflation have become rotten over the years. It is time to drop the emphasis on core inflation as a meaningful way to interpret the inflation process in the U.S." And in a May 2011 column in the Southeast Missourian, Bullard wrote that, "The emphasis on core inflation may give the impression that the FOMC does not take into account some important price changes when making decisions about monetary policy. This is damaging Fed credibility in Main Street America." Further, although two different price indexes are popular for measuring overall inflation (the consumer price index and the personal consumption expenditures index), in 2013 Bullard suggested adopting a standard measure that is consistently used to estimate and adjust for inflation that consumers face.

Bullard stated in May 2011 that the FOMC should adopt an explicit headline inflation target, which "would allow discussion of other measures of inflation in the context of a clearly stated ultimate goal with respect to the price side of the dual mandate."

Also, the St. Louis Fed president has stated that inflation targeting is the modern successor to the commodity standard and is the better choice in the current environment. While a commodity standard forces some accountability on the central bank, in the past "it did not always work because governments sometimes changed the rate between the commodity and the currency," Bullard said. Inflation targeting also forces more accountability to the central bank and anchors longer-term inflation expectations. He said that with inflation targeting, the central bank would have to specify its goal with respect to inflation and would be held accountable for achieving that goal. On Jan. 25, 2012, the FOMC set an inflation target of 2%, as measured by the annual change in the price index for personal consumption expenditures.

In his statement explaining his dissention at the June 2013 FOMC meeting, Bullard explained his view that the FOMC should defend its inflation target when inflation is below target — as it was at the time of the meeting — as well as when it is above target.

In January 2016, the FOMC clarified that its inflation target is symmetric by adding language in its "Statement on Longer-Run Goals and Monetary Policy Strategy," which said that "the Committee would be concerned if inflation were running persistently above or below this objective." While Bullard agreed that the inflation target is symmetric, he dissented on the statement because he viewed the language as "insufficiently forward-looking and therefore potentially confusing for Fed communications."

=== Federal Reserve independence ===
Since the beginning of the financial crisis in 2008, criticism of the Federal Reserve has become more prominent. The creation of the Dodd-Frank Wall Street Reform and Consumer Protection Act of 2010 revealed divided opinions on the future of the Federal Reserve. Some argued that the Republican victories in the 2010-midterm elections made ending the Fed more likely, while others, such as former Senator Chris Dodd (D-CT) and Senator Richard Shelby (R-AL), contended that the reforms introduced in the Dodd-Frank Act would strengthen the Fed by narrowing its focus to traditional responsibilities.

Bullard took a public stand in May 2010 in support of Federal Reserve independence and against any move in Congress that would lead to the politicization of the Fed. He has also argued that "The Fed should remain involved with community bank regulation so that it has a view of the entire financial landscape." As a Fed supporter, Bullard has said that the Federal Reserve is "well-designed" as a central bank because it keeps monetary policy decisions away from partisan politics while remaining part of the democratic process. Countries lacking an independent central bank may have poorer economic outcomes (e.g., higher inflation), he states. Bullard has said that the Fed is audited by several entities, including the GAO, and thus is directly accountable to Congress. Some have called for an end to the Fed's dual mandate of promoting maximum sustainable employment and price stability, a dual purpose questioned by critics including former Fed Chairman Paul Volcker. Bullard has suggested that the best way to achieve both parts of the mandate is by pursuing low and stable inflation.

=== Federal Reserve transparency ===
Bullard has called for increased transparency surrounding monetary policy through a quarterly monetary policy report. He argues its benefit "could be improved communication with financial markets and the American public about how the FOMC views the key issues facing the U.S. economy."

He has also called for press conferences to be held after every FOMC meeting, rather than only after four of the eight annual policy-setting meetings. He argues that only holding conferences after specific meetings gives those meetings a perceived added importance. "It's putting too much pressure on these meetings and it is making, in my opinion, the committee sometimes make decisions that are a little bit out of sync with the most recent data," Bullard said. He also added, "I want the committee to have a press conference at every meeting, so that every meeting looks, ex ante, identical. And this would give the committee the freedom to make a move or not make a move at a particular meeting."

=== Output gap ===
Bullard has also argued that the U.S. output gap may not be as large as many estimates suggest — as estimates are based on the notion that output was at, rather than above, potential during the housing-bubble period — which has implications for monetary policy. "It is not that the bubble destroyed potential, instead it is that actual output was higher than properly-defined potential during the mid-2000s, and then it crashed back as the bubble burst," Bullard said.

In a Feb. 6, 2012, speech, Bullard noted that the "large output gap" view is a reason some cite for keeping nominal interest rates near zero for an indefinite period. "If we continue using this interpretation of events, it may be very difficult for the U.S. to ever move off of the zero lower bound on nominal interest rates. This could be a looming disaster for the United States," he said.

== Personal life ==
Bullard is married to Jane Callahan. She holds a master's degree in public administration from Indiana University. The couple has two daughters.

Other offices
| Preceded by William Poole | President of the Federal Reserve Bank of St. Louis; 2008–2023 | Succeeded by Kathy O'Neill Paese; Acting |
