= Informational interview =

Type of networking conversation

An Informational Interview (also known as an informational meeting, coffee chat, or more generically, networking) is a conversation in which a person seeks insights on a career path, an industry, a company and/or general career advice from someone with experience and knowledge in the areas of interest. Informational interviews are often casual and candid conversations where both parties are focused simply on acquiring and sharing knowledge. They can also be formal if the knowledge seeker is a job seeker and the knowledge provider is a potential employer whose goal is not only to provide information to the job seeker, but also to learn about the job seeker and judge their professional potential and corporate fit.

Knowledge seekers use informational interviews to gather information on an industry and on specific companies where they might want to work, explore career paths, uncover job opportunities, and expand their professional network. Knowledge providers use informational interviews to share their knowledge and lend a helping hand, expand their professional network and meet potential employees and business partners.

Informational interviews differ from job interviews because the conversation is not about hiring and not about a specific job. The knowledge seeker asks general questions about an industry, company or career path, and the knowledge provider has an opportunity to learn about the knowledge seeker's character and qualifications outside of a formal job interview process. Thus, informational interviews help overcome a problem in recruiting/job-seeking processes, where each side may be hesitant to talk to the other because they are uncertain about whether they might be wasting their time with an unqualified candidate or unsuitable workplace. Informational interviews provide a "non-threatening forum" for discussion as the two sides learn about each other.

The term was coined by Richard Nelson Bolles, author of the best-selling career handbook What Color Is Your Parachute?.

== Sources of informational interviews ==
Sources of informational interviews include a knowledge seeker's friends and family, school alumni, fellow members of a community, social, non-profit or religious organization, former co-workers, partners and clients, professional acquaintances, and even total strangers, including industry leaders. Career advisors, coaches, teachers and recruiters can help connect knowledge seekers to other sources. Professional and social networking platforms are often used by knowledge seekers to identify and reach out to knowledge providers.

== Etiquette for Informational Interviews ==
When the job seeker initiates the interview, the professional being interviewed is doing a favor by providing information. It is important to be mindful of guidelines of informational interview etiquette, in addition to etiquette for traditional interviews. As for any interview, the potential candidate should learn in advance about the industry, the company and the individual. The time allowed is often short (15-20 minutes).
