= William Wolman =

American economist and commentator

William "Bill" Wolman (December 14, 1927 – December 5, 2011) was a longtime chief economist at BusinessWeek magazine, and a frequent commentator on CNBC. Journalism awards presented to Bill Wolman include the John Hancock Award, National Magazine Award, Deadline Club Award and University of Missouri Journalism Award. On CNBC, Wolman often paired with Neil Cavuto, acting as a taciturn foil to Cavutos more outspoken demeanour.

Born in Montreal, Canada, Wolman attended McGill University and went on to Stanford University to complete a Ph.D. in economics before he joined the economics staff at Business Week Magazine in 1960. He was married to the economist Anne Colamosca, with whom he often collaborated.

== Bibliography ==
- The Great 401k Hoax: What You Need to Know to Protect Your Family and Your Future; (co-authored with Anne Colamosca)
- The Judas Economy: The Triumph of Capital & the Betrayal of Work (with Anne Colamosca)
