= Homer Jones (economist) =

American economist

- Born: 1906
- Died: 1986 (aged 79–80)

Homer Jones (1906–1986) was an American economist.

In the course of his career, Jones spent time at Rutgers University, the University of Chicago, the Brookings Institution and the Federal Deposit Insurance Corporation. He is best known for serving as research director and later senior vice-president at the Federal Reserve Bank of St. Louis, which he joined in 1958. Under his leadership, the St. Louis Fed gained a reputation as a maverick in the Federal Reserve System because of its espousal of monetarism.

Milton Friedman, who studied under Jones at Rutgers, credited Jones' encouragement for his decision to become an economist.

The St. Louis Fed sponsors the annual Homer Jones Memorial Lecture Series in his memory. Speakers have included Nobel laureate Robert Lucas Jr.; R. Glenn Hubbard (2013), dean of the Columbia University Graduate School of Business, a former deputy assistant secretary at the U.S. Department of the Treasury and a former chairman of the Council of Economic Advisors; Mohamed A. El-Erian (2012), CEO and co-CIO of PIMCO and chair of U.S. President Barack Obama's Global Development Council; Axel A. Weber (2011), former president of Deutsche Bundesbank; and Alan S. Blinder (2010), an economist at Princeton University and a former vice chairman of the Board of Governors of the Federal Reserve System.
