= Lincoln National Bank =

- U.S. National Register of Historic Places
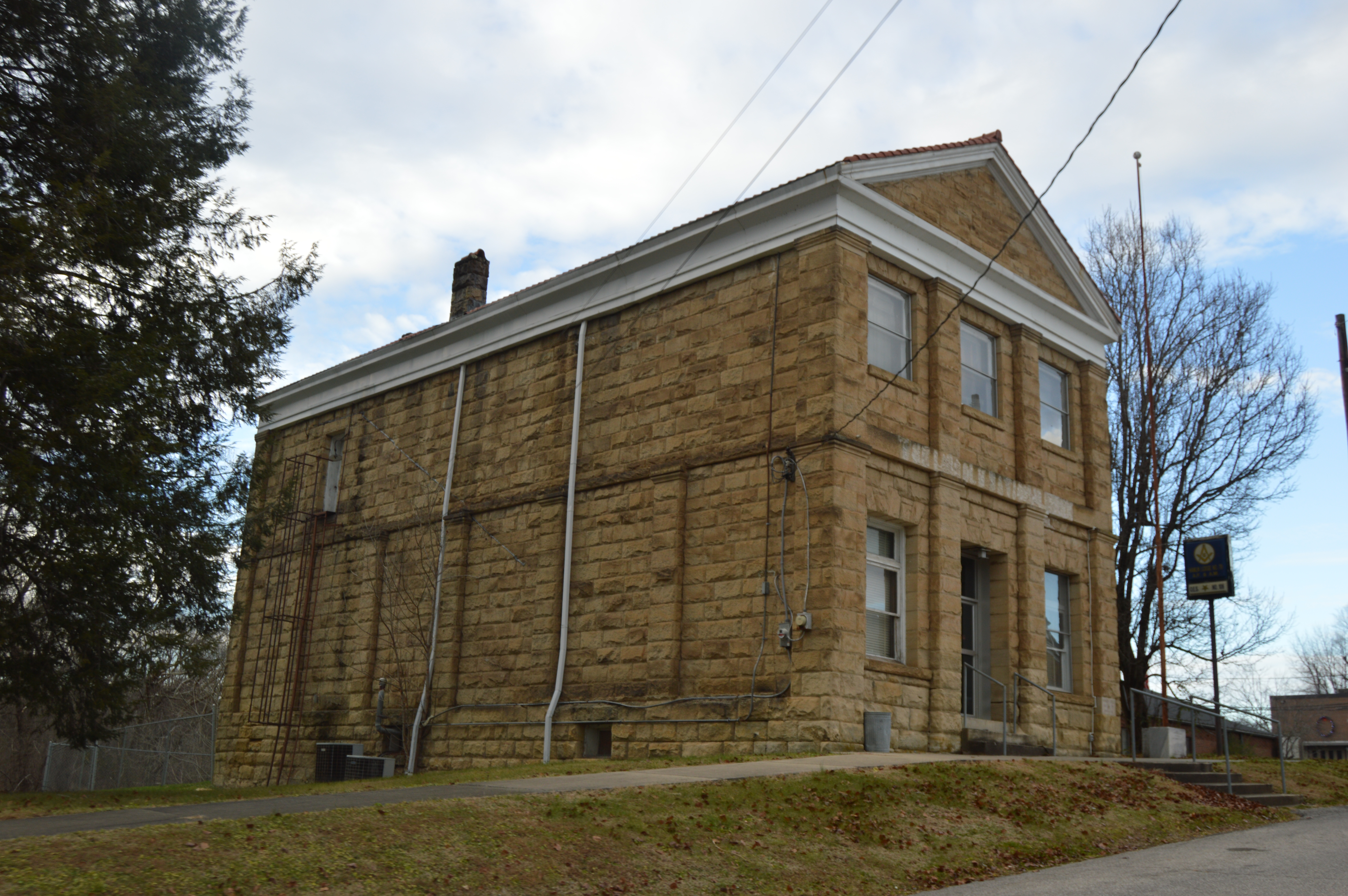
- Front and southern side

- Location within West Virginia Location within the United States
- Location: 219 Main St., Hamlin, West Virginia
- Coordinates: 38°16′35″N 82°6′22″W
- Built: c. 1907
- Architectural style: Classical Revival
- NRHP reference No.: 15000842
- Added to NRHP: November 24, 2015

The Lincoln National Bank is a historic bank building located at 219 Main Street in Hamlin, West Virginia. The building was constructed circa 1907 during an oil and gas boom that bolstered Lincoln County's population and economy. The bank occupied the first floor of the building, while the second floor was used by the town's Masonic lodge. The two-story stone building has a temple front which features stone pilasters and a raking cornice, typical features of Classical Revival architecture. At the time, the Classical Revival style was widely used in banks to convey strength and dignity as banking recovered from the Panic of 1893 and a subsequent loss of consumer trust. The bank operated from the building until 1961, when they sold it to the Masonic lodge; the lodge leased the first floor to the town's police department until the 1980s and now occupies the entire building.

The building was added to the National Register of Historic Places on November 24, 2015.
