= William Poole (economist) =

U.S. Federal Reserve Bank official

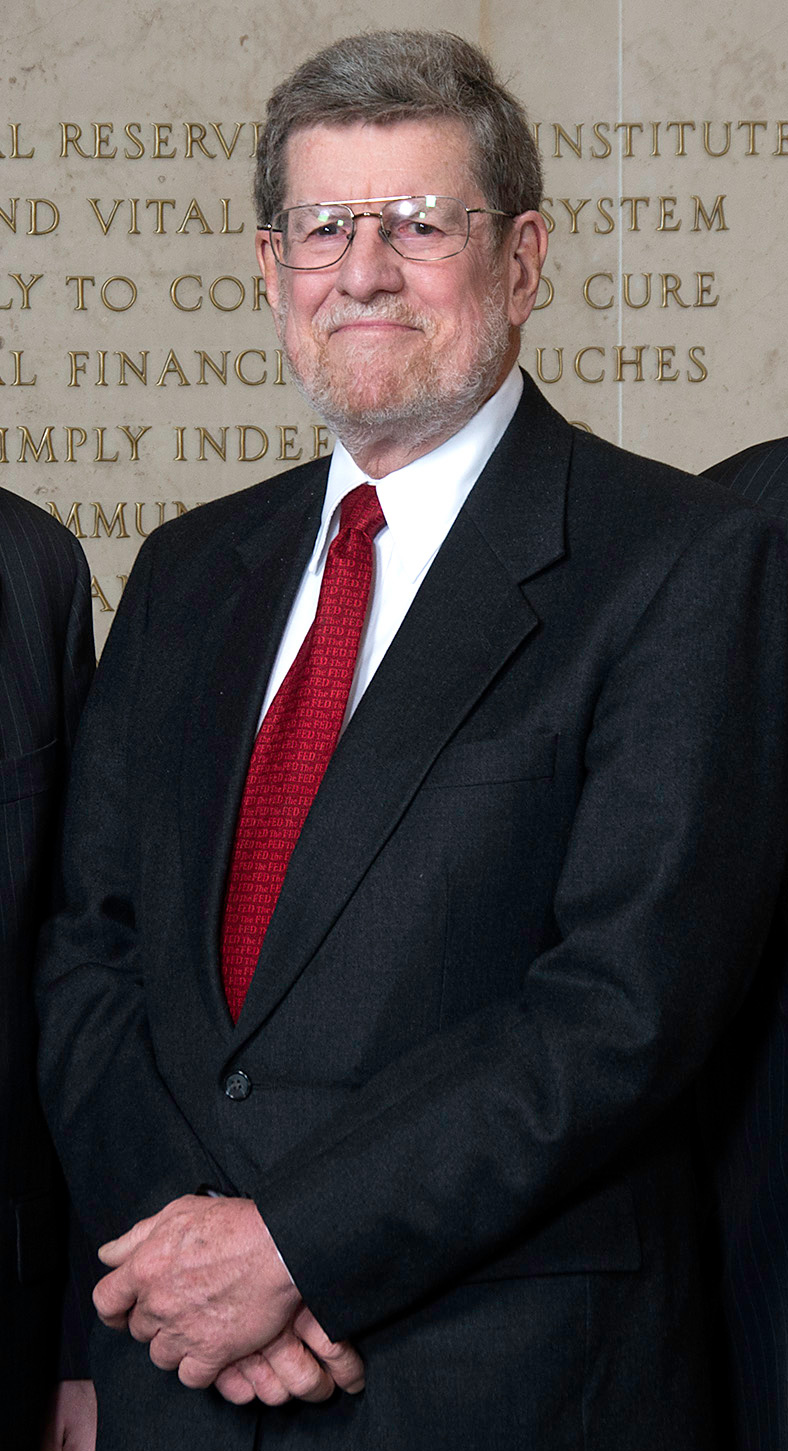

President of the Federal Reserve Bank of St. Louis
- In office March 23, 1998 – March 31, 2008
- Preceded by: Thomas Melzer
- Succeeded by: James B. Bullard

Personal details
- Born: June 19, 1937 (age 87); Wilmington, Delaware, U.S.
- Education: Swarthmore College (BA); University of Chicago (MBA, PhD)

Academic background
- Doctoral advisor: Merton Miller

Academic work
- Doctoral students: Robert King
- Website: Information at IDEAS / RePEc

William Poole (born June 19, 1937) is an American economist who served as the eleventh chief executive of the Federal Reserve Bank of St. Louis. He took office on March 23, 1998, and began serving his full term on March 1, 2001. In 2007, he served as a voting member of the Federal Open Market Committee, bringing his District's perspective to policy discussions in Washington. Poole stepped down from the Fed on March 31, 2008.

Poole is Senior Fellow at the Cato Institute, Senior Advisor to Merk Investments and, as of fall 2008, Distinguished Scholar in Residence at the University of Delaware.

== Biography ==
Poole was born on June 19, 1937, in Wilmington, Delaware. He received an A.B. degree in 1959 from Swarthmore College and an M.B.A. in 1963 and a Ph.D. in economics in 1966, both from the University of Chicago. Swarthmore honored him with a Doctor of Laws degree in 1989.

Poole began his career at the Board of Governors of the Federal Reserve System in 1964 and worked as a senior economist there from 1969 to 1974. In 1974, he joined the faculty at Brown University, twice served as chairman of the economics department, and for five years directed the university's Center for the Study of Financial Markets and Institutions. He was the Herbert H. Goldberger Professor of Economics there when he joined the Federal Reserve Bank of St. Louis.

Throughout his career, Poole has served as a visiting scholar and an adviser at numerous institutions. From 1970 to 1990 he was a member of, and became senior adviser to, the Brookings Panel on Economic Activity. In 1980–81, he was a visiting economist at the Reserve Bank of Australia. From 1982 to 1985, Poole was a member of the Council of Economic Advisers and a member of the Academic Advisory Panels of the Federal Reserve Banks of New York and Boston. From 1985 until his appointment to the St. Louis Bank, Poole was an adjunct scholar at the Cato Institute and a member of the Shadow Open Market Committee. In 1991, Poole was Bank Mees and Hope Visiting Professor of Economics at Erasmus University in Rotterdam. From 1989 to 1995, he served on the Congressional Budget Office Panel of Economic Advisors. In addition, he has been an adviser and consultant to the Federal Reserve Bank of Boston, a visiting scholar at the Federal Reserve Bank of San Francisco, and a visiting economist at the Reserve Bank of Australia.

Poole has engaged in a wide range of professional activities, including publishing numerous papers in professional journals. He has published two books, Money and the Economy: A Monetarist View, in 1978, and Principles of Economics, in 1991. During his 10 years at the St. Louis Fed, he gave over 150 speeches on a variety of topics.

Poole is a director of United Way of Greater St. Louis and member of the Webster University Board of Trustees. He was a member of the Chancellor's Council of the University of Missouri-St. Louis 1999–2003. He was inducted into The Johns Hopkins Society of Scholars in 2005, and presented with the Adam Smith Award by the National Association for Business Economics in 2006. In 2007, the Global Interdependence Center presented him its Frederick Heldring Award.

== Speaking out ==
In a July 10, 2008, interview with Bloomberg News discussing two government-sponsored enterprises (GSEs)—Fannie Mae and Freddie Mac—Poole said, "Congress ought to recognize that these firms are insolvent, that it is allowing these firms to continue to exist as bastions of privilege, financed by the taxpayer." The common and preferred equity shares of both GSEs declined sharply following Poole's comments, which prompted several Congressmembers, the OFHEO regulator, the Treasury Secretary, and President George W. Bush to make comments that were seen as supportive to the GSEs in order to stem fears that Fannie Mae and Freddie Mac would require a government bailout.

Poole was the 2009 keynote speaker at the Tulane Corporate Law Institute.

In a major article in April 2009 about Obama administration Treasury Secretary Timothy Geithner and his role in the 2008 financial crisis, William Poole was reported to have said that the Fed, by effectively creating money out of thin air, not only runs the risk of 'massive inflation' but has also done an end-run around congressional power to control spending. Many of the programs 'ought to be legislated and shouldn't be in the Federal Reserve at all,' he contended." The article reported that, "[a]s the Fed became the biggest vehicle for the bailout, its balance sheet more than doubled, from $900 billion in October 2007 to more than $2 trillion today."

== See also ==
- Federal takeover of Fannie Mae and Freddie Mac
- 2008 financial crisis

Other offices
Preceded by Thomas Melzer	President of the Federal Reserve Bank of St. Louis; 1998–2008	Succeeded by James B. Bullard
