= Federal Reserve Bank of St. Louis =

Member Bank of Federal Reserve

Coordinates: 38°37′42″N 90°11′17″W

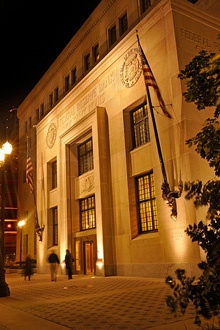
- The Federal Reserve Bank of St. Louis in 2010
- Central bank of: Eighth District: Arkansas Parts of: Illinois; Indiana; Kentucky; Mississippi; Missouri; Tennessee
- Headquarters: Broadway and Locust Street; St. Louis, Missouri, US
- Established: May 18, 1914 (112 years ago)
- President: Alberto G. Musalem
- Website: stlouisfed.org
- The Federal Reserve Bank of St. Louis is one of 12 regional banks that make up the Federal Reserve System

The Federal Reserve Bank of St. Louis is one of the twelve Federal Reserve Banks of the United States. It is responsible for the Eighth District of the Federal Reserve System, which encompasses Arkansas and portions of Illinois, Indiana, Kentucky, Mississippi, the eastern half of Missouri and West Tennessee. The district is headquartered in St. Louis and has branch offices in Little Rock, Louisville and Memphis. The bank's chief executive officer and president is Alberto Musalem.

Missouri is the only state to have two main Federal Reserve Banks as Kansas City also has a bank. Located in downtown St. Louis, the St. Louis Fed headquarters at 411 Locust Street was designed by St. Louis firm Mauran, Russell & Crowell in 1924. The Eighth District serves as a center for local, national and global economic research, and provides the following services: supervisory and regulatory services to state-member banks and bank holding companies; cash and coin-handling for the District and beyond; economic education; and community development resources.

== Board of directors ==
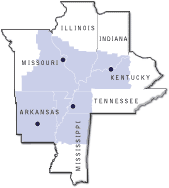
Map of the Eighth District

The following people serve on the board of directors as of February 5, 2026.

Name	Title	Term Expires
Lal Karsanbhai (Chair)	President and CEO, Emerson Electric Co. St. Louis, Missouri	December 31, 2027
Gregory A. Heckman (Deputy Chair)	CEO, Bunge Global SA; St. Louis, Missouri	December 31, 2026
Nina Leigh Krueger	CEO and President, Nestlé Purina PetCare Co. St. Louis, Missouri	December 31, 2028
William B. Dunavant III	Chairman and CEO, Dunavant Enterprises Inc. Memphis, Tennessee	December 31, 2027
Michael Ugwueke	President and CEO, Methodist Le Bonheur Healthcare; Memphis, Tennessee	December 31, 2027
Misty Borrowman	President and CEO, Bank of Hillsboro; Hillsboro, Illinois	December 31, 2027
Mardie R. Herndon Jr.	President and CEO, The Paducah Bank & Trust Co. Paducah, Kentucky	December 31, 2026

== Responsibilities ==
=== Monetary policy ===
Congress gave the Federal Reserve responsibility for setting monetary policy under the Federal Reserve Act of 1913 so that actions taken by the central bank would be free from political concerns. Along with the other 11 regional Feds, the St. Louis Fed helps guide the nation's economy by participating on the Federal Open Market Committee. Advised by the research division staff, President Alberto Musalem contributes informed opinions about national and district conditions, and participates in FOMC decisions concerning monetary policy, including setting the target range for the federal funds rate.

=== Supervisory functions ===
The St. Louis Fed supervises state-member banks and bank holding companies, and, since the passage of the Dodd-Frank Act, savings and loan holding companies. The Banking Supervision and Regulation division, led by senior vice president Carl White, is tasked with assessing the safety and soundness of financial institutions' assets and operations, the effectiveness of their risk management practices, and their compliance with laws and regulations governing activities and consumer protection. Examiners collect and verify data from financial institutions to ensure an accurate accounting of financial institutions' conditions, as well as data on the money and reserves in the banking system. The Federal Reserve is considered the "lender of last resort" for financial institutions, and the St. Louis Fed is tasked with ensuring adequate liquidity in financial markets by making loans to depository institutions through the "discount window" and allowing the prudent use of intraday credit. The St. Louis Fed processes bank applications for acquisitions and new activities.

Twelve senior executives of banks, thrift institutions and credit unions in the Eighth District serve on the St. Louis Fed's Community Depository Institutions Advisory Council (CDIAC), which meets twice a year to advise the St. Louis Fed president on the credit, banking and economic conditions facing the members' institutions and communities. The chairman of the St. Louis Fed's CDIAC represents the Eighth District at the Board of Governors' CDIAC meetings, held twice annually. Banking-related publications include quarterly banking performance data, tailored to bank executives in the Eighth District. The publication Central Banker was discontinued in 2014.

=== Community development ===
As part of Banking Supervision and Regulation, the St. Louis Fed's Community Development department provides financial institutions and others with information on the Community Reinvestment Act (CRA), community and economic development, and issues related to credit access. The department also facilitates partnerships between lenders and their communities and seeks to generate economic development and affordable housing throughout the Eighth District. Executives from organizations throughout the district serve on the St. Louis Fed's Community Development Advisory Council, which was created to keep the St. Louis Fed's president and community development staff informed about development issues and to suggest ways the bank might support local development efforts. The executives are all experts in community and economic development and represent nonprofit organizations, financial institutions, universities, local governments and foundations. Community Development holds many events throughout the year, covering such topics as the impact and possible solutions to foreclosures and vacancies, neighborhood revitalization, rebuilding household balance sheets, and reaching the unbanked and underbanked. Publications include Bridges, a quarterly publication for community organizations and leaders.

=== Economic research ===
The St. Louis Fed's research division, led by executive vice president Carlos Garriga, produces economic research for a wide range of national and international audiences. In the 1960s, the St. Louis Fed garnered a reputation as a maverick in the Federal Reserve System because of its espousal of monetarism. Spurred by bank president Darryl Francis and research director Homer Jones, the bank's economists published research showing a direct relationship between the growth of money and inflation. Monetarist theories have since been adopted widely.

St. Louis Fed economists previously released the Burgundy Books, patterned after the Federal Reserve System's Beige Book, as an economic snapshot of the four zones in the district (Little Rock, Louisville, Memphis and St. Louis). The Burgundy Books collected data and anecdotal feedback from numerous sources to help track the district's consumer spending, commercial and residential real estate, manufacturing and industrial activities, banking data and more. Publication was discontinued after 2015.

Research publications include the Review, a journal of national and international economic developments, particularly focusing on their monetary aspects; Economic Synopses, short essays and reports on the economic issues of the day; and The Regional Economist, a magazine with articles written largely by economists but for readers who, for the most part, aren't economists.

The St. Louis Fed's research division maintains Federal Reserve Economic Data (FRED), a database of hundreds of thousands time series from national, international, private and public sources. Data series include interest rates, gross domestic product and its components, GDP and gross national product together, employment and population, consumer price indexes, monetary aggregates and Treasury constant maturity. FRED and the other free online data services—ALFRED, CASSIDI and FRASER—are collectively, with other research sites, accessed several million times a year. Writing at Business Insider, Joe Weisenthal called FRED "The most amazing economics website in the world." The bank also maintains the Research Papers in Economics (RePEc) database, a listing of economics authors and the Economics Departments, Institutes and Research Centers in the World (EDIRC) databases.

Former Palestinian Prime Minister Salam Fayyad once served on the staff of the Federal Reserve Bank of St. Louis, where he did early research on the American Divisia Monetary Aggregates.

=== Economic education ===
The St. Louis Fed's Econ Lowdown provides a variety of free online tools for K-16 educators nationwide, including online modules, videos, audio podcasts, and PDF lesson plans. The economics topics covered include basic concepts such as opportunity cost and supply and demand to more complex topics such as comparative advantage and monetary policy. In personal finance, the topics include earning income, taxes, budgeting, saving, banks and credit cards. Economic education staff provide conferences for K-16 educators. Economic Education publishes a newsletter, Page One Economics. Another newsletter, Inside the Vault, was retired in 2015. Another publication, In Plain English, is a multimedia online course on the structure and functions of the Federal Reserve System. Many materials, including personal finance online courses and personal finance chats, are available in Spanish as well as English.

=== U.S. Treasury support ===
The St. Louis Fed supports the U.S. Treasury with a number of functions. The Treasury Division includes the Treasury Relations and Support Office (TRSO), which manages the Federal Reserve System's overall relationships with the U.S. Department of the Treasury's Bureau of the Fiscal Service and Office of Fiscal Assistant Secretary. The St. Louis Fed's Treasury Division supports the following U.S. Treasury programs: Debt Management Services, Fiscal Accounting Operations, Information and Security Services, Payment Management, Revenue Collections Management, and Treasury Security Services. It also serves as the offering administrator for the Fed's Term Deposit Facility.

=== Payments support ===
Beginning in the mid-2000s, the Federal Reserve consolidated its check-handling services as the number of paper checks fell rapidly in favor of check cards, debit cards and electronic bill payments. The most recently completed payments study (released in late 2010) revealed that more than three-quarters of noncash payments in America were done electronically. On March 3, 2010, the Federal Reserve Bank of Cleveland became the Fed's single paper check processing and adjustments site and the Federal Reserve Bank of Atlanta became the Fed's single electronic check processing site. The St. Louis Fed provides currency and coin handling services for the Eighth District and beyond, which includes helping to ensure that depository institutions have enough currency and coin to meet public demand through currency ordering and depositing services. The St. Louis Fed also checks currency for fit status (money that can still be circulated), destroys notes that can no longer be circulated and reports counterfeit money to the United States Secret Service.

=== General outreach ===
The St. Louis Fed holds several events annually for educators, civic and business leaders, bankers and more throughout the district. These include the "Dialogue with the Fed" events for the public, in which St. Louis Fed experts discuss economic matters such as the federal deficit, the financial crisis and unemployment; and "Economic Briefings", where a Fed economist or other expert discusses the current local and national economy. The St. Louis Fed also features research symposiums, educator workshops and special presentations on topics such as the cost of higher education and recession demographics.

=== Office of Minority and Women Inclusion ===
As with all Federal Reserve banks, the St. Louis Fed established an Office of Minority and Women Inclusion (OMWI) in January 2011, as called for by the Dodd-Frank Act. The St. Louis OMWI is designed to increase participation of minority- and women-owned businesses in Bank procurement needs, further diversify the St. Louis Fed's workforce at all levels, and support financial literacy efforts at inner-city, girls' and majority-minority high schools.

== Past leadership ==
When the Federal Reserve System was established in 1914, the chief executive officers of the regional banks were known as Governors. The position was renamed to President after the Banking Act of 1935.

#	Photo	CEO	Life span	Term start	Term end	Ref
Governors
1		Rolla Wells	1856–1944	October 28, 1914	February 5, 1919	
2		David C. Biggs	1866–1931	February 5, 1919	December 31, 1928	
3		William McChesney Martin Sr.	1874–1955	January 16, 1929	—	—
Presidents
(3)		William McChesney Martin Sr.	1874–1955	—	February 28, 1941	
4		Chester C. Davis	1887–1975	April 16, 1941	February 1, 1951	
5		Delos C. Johns	1899–1981	February 1, 1951	February 28, 1962	
6		Harry A. Shuford	1913–2007	October 1, 1962	January 16, 1966	
7		Darryl R. Francis	1912–2002	January 17, 1966	February 29, 1976	
8		Lawrence K. Roos	1918–2005	March 22, 1976	January 31, 1983	
9		Theodore H. Roberts		February 1, 1983	December 31, 1984	
10		Thomas C. Melzer		June 1, 1985	January 31, 1998	
11		William Poole	born 1937	March 23, 1998	March 31, 2008	
12		James B. Bullard	born 1961	April 1, 2008	August 15, 2023	
–		Kathleen O'Neill Paese; Acting		August 15, 2023	April 1, 2024	

== See also ==
- Federal Reserve Act
- Federal Reserve Bank
- Federal Reserve Bank of St. Louis Little Rock Branch
- Federal Reserve Bank of St. Louis Louisville Branch
- Federal Reserve Bank of St. Louis Memphis Branch
- List of Federal Reserve branches
- Structure of the Federal Reserve System
