= Wall Street Journal Economic Survey =

The Wall Street Journal Economic Survey, also known as the Wall Street Journal Economic Forecasting Survey, could refer to either the monthly or the semi-annual survey conducted by the Wall Street Journal of over 50 economists on important indicators of the economy of the United States.

== History ==
Records of the monthly survey on the Wall Street Journal website go back to December 2002 and records of the semiannual survey range between the years 2003 and 2007. However, the survey dates back to at least 1986.

== Reception ==
=== Academic reception ===
The Wall Street Journal Economic Survey has been cited and used in some academic research on forecast accuracy and the nature of expectations.

=== Reception in the financial press and blogs ===
Forecasts made in the Wall Street Journal Economic Survey are often discussed by other financial press and blog articles.

== See also ==
- Best on the Street, a similar survey of financial analysts by the Wall Street Journal that is used to rank the relative performance of the analysts.
- Economic forecasting
- Survey of Professional Forecasters
- ECB Survey of Professional Forecasters
- Livingston Survey
- Blue Chip Economic Indicators
- OECD Main Economic Indicators
- OECD Economic Outlook
- Consensus Economics
- Consensus forecast
