= Economic Outlook (OECD publication) =

Economic Outlook is a twice-yearly analysis (available for online viewing, download, and in print) published by the Organisation for Economic Co-operation and Development (OECD) with economic analysis and forecasts for future economic performance of OECD countries. The main version is in English, and it is also published in French and German. The OECD also publishes Monthly Economic Indicators (updated every month) to complement the twice-yearly Economic Outlook.

== Reception ==
=== Academic research ===
Academics have looked at the projections and forecasting record of the OECD as well as the International Monetary Fund, in some cases comparing these to consensus forecasts such as those published by Consensus Economics.

A 2000 paper by Jordi Pons of the University of Barcelona, Spain examined the accuracy and bias of the OECD Economic Outlook forecasts as well as the International Monetary Fund (IMF) World Economic Outlook forecasts.

A 2001 paper by Roy Batchelor of City University Business School, London compared the Consensus Forecasts with forecasts made by the International Monetary Fund (IMF) and the OECD. The study found: "With few exceptions, the private sector forecasts are less biased and more accurate in terms of mean absolute error and root mean square error. Formal tests show these differences are statistically significant for forecasts of real growth and production, less so for forecasts of inflation and unemployment. Overall, there appears little information in the OECD and IMF forecasts that could be used to reduce significantly the error in the private sector forecasts."

== See also ==
- OECD Main Economic Indicators, a related monthly publication by the OECD
- Economic forecasting
- World Economic Outlook, a similar publication by the International Monetary Fund
- ECB Survey of Professional Forecasters, a quarterly publication by the European Central Bank based on a survey of economists about the economy of Europe.
- Survey of Professional Forecasters, a quarterly publication by the Federal Reserve Bank of Philadelphia based on a survey of economists about the economy of the United States.
- Blue Chip Economic Indicators, a monthly publication by Aspen Publishers based on a survey of economists about the economy of the United States.
- Consensus Economics, publisher of Consensus Forecasts, a monthly publication with macroeconomic forecasts of 85 countries based on a poll of 700 economists.
