= Asian Development Outlook =

The Asian Development Outlook is an annual publication (available online and in print) produced by the Asian Development Bank (ADB). It offers economic analysis and forecasts, as well as an examination of social development issues, for most countries in Asia. It is published each March/April with an update published in September and brief supplements published in July and December. The publication is prepared by staff of ADB's regional departments, and field offices, under the coordination of the Economic Research and Regional Cooperation Department with the goal of developing "consistent forecasts for the region".

The publication is often cited by major news outlets, due in part to its forecasts of economic growth rates and trends in countries such as the People's Republic of China and India. A 2014 study assessed the accuracy of ADB's Asian Development Outlook, in comparison to the International Monetary Fund's World Economic Outlook, for the years 2008 to 2011. The Asian Development Outlook fared better at estimating both current-year gross domestic product (GDP) growth and consumer price index (CPI) inflation of Asian economies. The World Economic Outlook was more accurate at predicting year-ahead GDP forecasts. Both publications lacked accuracy during the years when the region was facing economic crisis.

== See also ==
- Global Economic Prospects, a similar publication by the World Bank Group
- World Economic Outlook, a similar publication by the International Monetary Fund
- ECB Survey of Professional Forecasters, a quarterly publication by the European Central Bank based on a survey of economists about the economy of Europe
- Survey of Professional Forecasters, a quarterly publication by the Federal Reserve Bank of Philadelphia based on a survey of economists about the economy of the United States
- Blue Chip Economic Indicators, a monthly publication by Aspen Publishers based on a survey of economists about the economy of the United States
- Consensus Economics, publisher of Consensus Forecasts, a monthly publication with macroeconomic forecasts of 85 countries based on a poll of 700 economists.
