= OECD Main Economic Indicators =

OECD Main Economic Indicators, often simply called Main Economic Indicators and abbreviated MEI, is a monthly publication by the Organisation for Economic Co-operation and Development (OECD) of economic indicators worldwide (with a focus on OECD countries). According to the official website, it "presents comparative statistics that provide an overview of recent international economic developments." The publication is available online at the OECD iLibrary.

== Reception ==
=== Academic research ===
The OECD Main Economic Indicators have been used extensively in the academic literature to study the performance of OECD and (some) non-OECD countries.

=== Media reception ===
The OECD Main Economic Indicators (as well as a related twice-yearly publication called Economic Outlook) inform commentary on economic performance in the mainstream and financial press, including by Reuters, Agence France-Presse, the Wall Street Journal, and Bloomberg.

== See also ==
- Economic Outlook (OECD publication)
- Blue Chip Economic Indicators
- Survey of Professional Forecasters
- ECB Survey of Professional Forecasters
- World Economic Outlook
- African Economic Outlook
- Consensus Economics: Surveys of International Economic Forecasts
