= SPF =

SPF may refer to:

== Science and technology ==
- Sun protection factor, of sunscreen
- Space Power Facility, a NASA test facility

=== Biology ===
- Specific-pathogen-free, laboratory animals known to be without pathogens
- S-phase-promoting factor, in biology
- Spot 42 RNA, a small regulatory RNA found in some gammaproteobacteria

=== Computing and mathematics ===
- Sender Policy Framework, for email authentication
- Structured Programming Facility, software product for IBM mainframe operating systems
- Shortest Path First, or Dijkstra's algorithm
- Formal spectrum of a ring, a construction in algebraic geometry

=== Materials ===
- Superplastic forming, of sheet metal
- Spray polyurethane foam, a building insulation material
- Spruce-pine-fir, mixed softwood timber

== Government ==
- Social protection floor, a level of protection in a national social protection system
- Security Policy Framework, UK
- Servicio Penitenciario Federal, the Argentine Federal Penitentiary Service
- Scottish Police Federation, represents Scottish police officers
- Singapore Police Force
- Somali Police Force
- Special Police Force, a unit within a police force

== Economics ==
- Survey of Professional Forecasters, US macroeconomic forecasts survey
- ECB Survey of Professional Forecasters, macroeconomic forecasts

== Transportation ==
- Black Hills Airport (IATA airport code), South Dakota, US
- Sherwood Park Freeway, Edmonton, Alberta, Canada
- Springfield railway station (Scotland) (station code)

== Other uses ==
- Summer Play Festival, New York City, US
- Société des poètes français, the oldest poetry society in France
- Synomosía Pyrínon tis Fotiás (Conspiracy of Fire Nuclei), Greek terrorist organization

== See also ==
- Single point of failure (SPOF)
- Socialist Party of Florida (SPFL)
