= Economic trend =

Economic trend may refer to:

- all the economic indicators that are the subject of economic forecasting
  - see also: econometrics
- general trends in the economy, see: economic history.
- general trends in the academic field of economics, see: history of economics
