= Delaware Stadium =

Multi-purpose stadium in Newark, Delaware

Coordinates: 39.6617°N 75.7488°W

Tubby Raymond Field at Delaware Stadium
- The Tub

- Delaware Stadium in 2025
- Interactive map of Tubby Raymond Field at Delaware Stadium
- Full name: Tubby Raymond Field at Delaware Stadium
- Address: South College Avenue 19716; Newark, DE; United States
- Owner: University of Delaware
- Operator: Univ. of Delaware Athletics
- Capacity: 18,500 (2020–present) Former capacity: List: 16,730 (2019); 22,000 (1998–2018); 23,000 (1979–1998); 21,500 (1970–1978); 13,500 (1964–1969); 10,000 (1958–1963); 9,000 (1952–1957)
- Type: Stadium
- Surface: FieldTurf
- Current use: Football; Lacrosse
- Public transit: DART First State bus: 16, 33, 46, 302

Construction
- Groundbreaking: August 3, 1951
- Opened: November 15, 1952; 73 years ago
- Renovated: 1993, 2019
- Expanded: 1964, 1970, 1972, 1975
- Cost: $182,000 ($2.21 million in 2025 dollars)

Tenants
- Delaware Fightin' Blue Hens (NCAA); Football (1952–present); Men's and women's lacrosse (2010–present)

Website
- bluehens.com/delaware-stadium

Delaware Stadium is an 18,500-seat stadium in Newark, Delaware, and is home to the University of Delaware Fightin' Blue Hens football and men's and women's lacrosse teams. The stadium is part of the David M. Nelson Athletic Complex, which includes the Bob Carpenter Center, Fred P. Rullo Stadium, the Fred Rust Ice Arena and the Delaware Field House.

== History ==
Delaware Stadium opened on November 15, 1952, with the Blue Hens defeating Lafayette 13–12. Delaware Stadium has expanded with the growth of the university, with seating expansions in 1964, 1970, 1972, and 1975. Upgrades to the seating and facilities were made in 1992–93, along with a resurfacing of the field and reconstruction of the drainage and irrigation systems. Prior to the 2000 season, the university installed permanent lighting at the stadium, consisting of eight stanchions casting broadcast quality light. The first night game in Delaware Stadium history was played against The Citadel on September 9, 2000, with 22,075 in attendance.

The Blue Hens once were among the attendance leaders in I-AA/FCS for over 30 years, with a fan base as loyal as those of major FBS teams. For a typical Blue Hen home game, Delaware Stadium becomes the fourth-largest city in the state (behind Wilmington, Dover and Newark itself). Average attendance for the 2022 season was 16,902 which was 8th in the FCS, and in 2023 season it was 15,656 which was 10th in the FCS. Average attendance for the 2006 season was 21,825; second only to the University of Montana. By comparison, most FCS teams attract 10,000 on a good day. Delaware is the only NCAA FCS team in the nation to average 20,000 or more fans per regular season home game from 1999 to 2010. The largest Delaware Stadium crowd was the standing-room only crowd of 23,719 that watched the Blue Hens host Temple, October 27, 1973.

On August 29, 2002, the field was dedicated as Tubby Raymond Field, in honor of longtime Blue Hen Football coach Harold "Tubby" Raymond.

The stadium has hosted the Division I NCAA Men's Lacrosse Championship in 1984 and 1986, and two NCAA men's lacrosse tournament first-round games in May 2002.

=== Renovations ===
The stadium underwent another renovation in mid-2008 with the addition of a 42-foot-wide (13 m) HD video board and a high-fidelity, 20 kilowatt audio system. A video control room was added inside the Bob Carpenter Center.

From December 2009 to January 2010 the grass field was replaced with new FieldTurf artificial surface.

The stands underwent more improvements in the summer of 2011. Hand rails were added along each aisle of the east and west grandstands.

== Present day ==
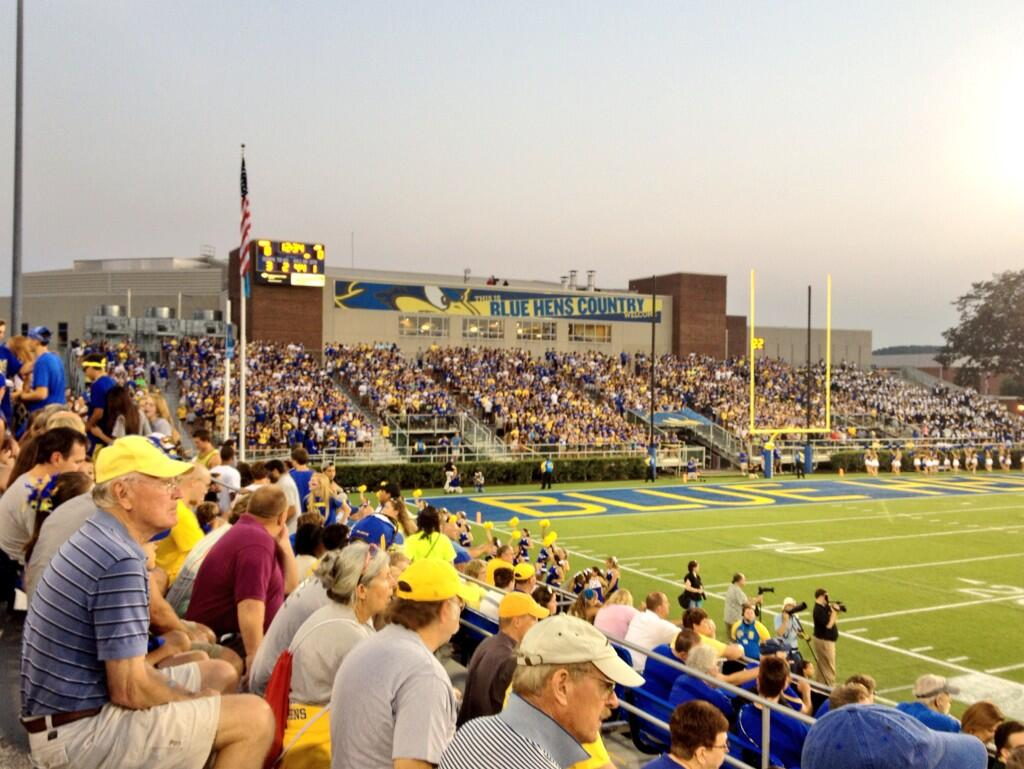
The student section of Delaware Stadium, known as the Cockpit, in reference to the Fightin' Blue Hens mascot.

The current stadium configuration has concrete grandstands on the east and west sides, with the press box on the top of the west grandstand, and permanent metal bleachers on the north and south end zones. Behind the north end zone there is the scoreboard with a video screen used to show replays and other videos. The Delaware football team enters the field from the tunnel beneath the south end zone bleachers, which are reserved for student seating and the marching band.

The "Cockpit" is the nickname of the University of Delaware's student section at home football games located behind the south end zone. At 18,500, Delaware Stadium has the second largest seating capacity in the Coastal Athletic Association (CAA), behind North Carolina A&T's Truist Stadium.

Delaware Stadium is also the venue for the annual commencement ceremonies for graduating seniors and graduate students in May.

On June 6, 2010, plans for stadium renovations were unveiled by University President Patrick Harker. The new plans unveiled include adding luxury suites to the stadium, an additional 8,200 seats overall (which would have increased seating to over 30,000 seats), a 96,000-square-foot (8,900 m^{2}) performance center, a club lounge, and new facilities for TV and radio. However, these plans never materialized.

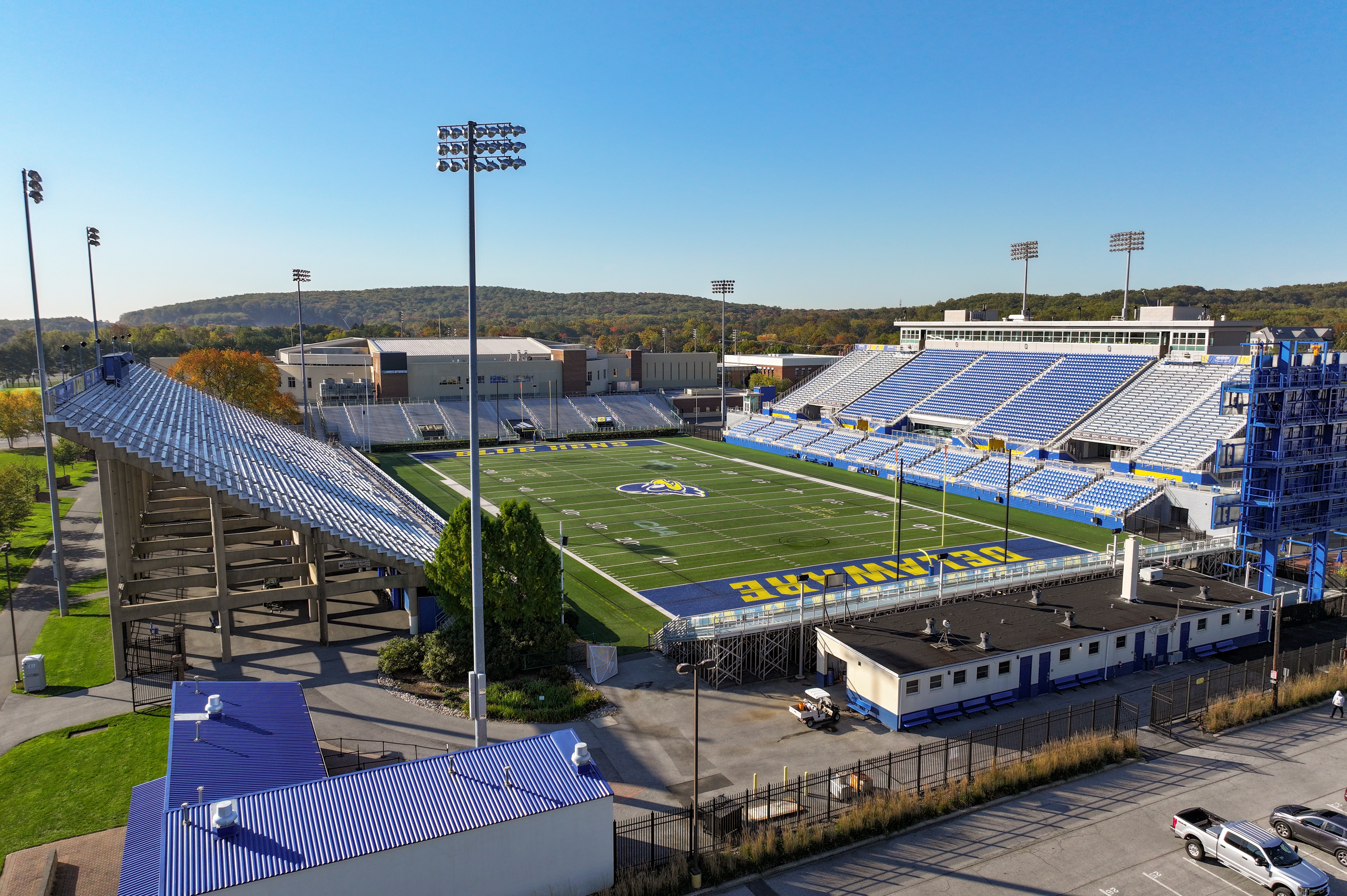
A north view of Delaware Stadium and the stands.

In November 2018, it was announced that, as part of a $60 million campaign, a new athletic training center would be built and Delaware Stadium would be renovated. Improvements to the stadium will include upgrading the west (home) stands (including more chair-back seating), a new press box and enhanced restrooms and concessions. Construction on this project is currently in progress. The new seating areas were completed on time for the Delaware season opener August 29, 2019; however the press box, club level, and concessions were not. Temporary press boxes were built on the east stands for use during the entire 2019 season, along with temporary restroom and concession facilities. The Stadium renovations and Whitney Athletic center have been completed as of December 2020. A new video board was installed for the 2023 season. Delaware is expected to soon announce a fund-raising project to construct an $80 million building with offices and indoor practice facilities at the north end of Delaware Stadium instead of a previously planned Field House restoration.

== Attendance records ==
Highest attendance at Delaware Stadium
Rank	Attendance	Date	Game result
1	23,619	October 27, 1973	Blue Hens 8, Temple 31
2	23,110	September 9, 1985	Blue Hens 16, Navy 13
3	23,100	November 14, 1987	Blue Hens 22, Navy 31
4	23,045	October 18, 1986	Blue Hens 18, William & Mary 22
5	23,019	November 19, 1977	Blue Hens 21, Colgate 3
6	22,911	November 7, 1992	Blue Hens 33, Connecticut 7
7	22,891	November 20, 2010	Blue Hens 21, Villanova 28 (OT)
8	22,805	October 28, 1989	Blue Hens 35, Maine 28
9	22,784	October 3, 1981	Blue Hens 21, Lehigh 24
10	22,782	September 11, 2004	Blue Hens 21, Towson 17
11	22,727	September 2, 2004	Blue Hens 21, New Hampshire 24
12	22,680	November 1, 1980	Blue Hens 17, Villanova 7
13	22,648	November 18, 1972	Blue Hens 20, Bucknell 3
14	22,601	November 2, 1991	Blue Hens 34, Maine 10
15	22,582	October 30, 1971	Blue Hens 27, Temple 32
16	22,576	October 16, 2010	Blue Hens 24, Rhode Island 17
17	22,555	October 18, 1980	Blue Hens 7, Northern Michigan 22
18	22,537	September 10, 2005	Blue Hens 34, Lehigh 33
19	22,495	September 8, 2007	Blue Hens 41, West Chester 14
20	22,379	September 19, 1981	Blue Hens 13, Temple 7
21	22,331	September 17, 2005	Blue Hens 42, West Chester 21
22	22,329	September 9, 2006	Blue Hens 30, West Chester 7
23	22,304	October 5, 1991	Blue Hens 28, New Hampshire 45
24	22,301	October 22, 1988	Blue Hens 10, Massachusetts 7
25	22,293	October 28, 1995	Blue Hens 61, Maine 0

== Delaware football records at Delaware Stadium ==
Year	Win	Loss	Tie	Win %
1952	1	0	0	1.000
1953	4	1	0	.800
1954	5	0	0	1.000
1955	4	1	0	.800
1956	3	2	1	.583
1957	2	2	0	.500
1958	3	2	0	.600
1959	4	0	0	1.000
1960	1	4	0	.200
1961	3	1	0	.750
1962	4	1	0	.800
1963	4	0	0	1.000
1964	3	2	0	.600
1965	3	1	0	.750
1966	4	0	0	1.000
1967	1	4	0	.200
1968	5	0	0	1.000
1969	5	1	0	.833
1970	5	1	0	.833
1971	5	1	0	.833
1972	6	0	0	1.000
1973	5	1	0	.833
1974	8	0	0	1.000
1975	5	3	0	.625
1976	5	2	1	.688
1977	5	1	1	.786
1978	9	0	0	1.000
1979	8	1	0	.889
1980	6	1	0	.857
1981	5	2	0	.714
1982	8	0	0	1.000
1983	2	6	0	.250
1984	7	1	0	.875
1985	5	2	0	.714
1986	4	3	0	.571
1987	3	3	0	.500
1988	3	3	0	.500
1989	4	2	0	.667
1990	4	2	0	.667
1991	4	2	0	.667
1992	6	2	0	.750
1993	6	1	0	.857
1994	4	1	1	.750
1995	7	0	0	1.000
1996	6	0	0	1.000
1997	6	2	0	.750
1998	5	1	0	.833
1999	4	2	0	.667
2000	7	2	0	.778
2001	2	3	0	.400
2002	5	1	0	.833
2003	10	0	0	1.000
2004	6	1	0	.857
2005	4	2	0	.667
2006	3	4	0	.429
2007	6	1	0	.857
2008	3	3	0	.500
2009	4	2	0	.667
2010	9	1	0	.900
2011	5	1	0	.833
2012	4	3	0	.571
2013	5	2	0	.714
2014	4	3	0	.571
2015	3	3	0	.500
2016	2	3	0	.400
2017	5	1	0	.833
2018	4	2	0	.667
2019	4	3	0	.571
2020	3	0	0	1.000
2021	4	2	0	.667
2022	6	1	0	.857
2023	5	2	0	.714
2024	7	0	0	1.000
2025	5	1	0	.833
Total	344–115–4			.747

== See also ==
- Frazer Field
- Wilmington Park
- List of NCAA Division I FBS football stadiums
