= The Business Review =

The Business Review may refer to:

- Business Review, now Economic Insights, a publication of the Federal Reserve Bank of Philadelphia
- The Business Review (Albany)
- Florida State University Business Review
