= Christiane Baumeister =

German economist

Christiane Baumeister is a German economist. She is the Lambert Family Professor of Economics at the University of Notre Dame in the United States.

She holds the named professor title of Robert H. Lambert, Class of 1940, Helen B. Lambert, Mary E. Lambert and Michael P. Lambert Professor of Economics. Her research focuses on empirical macroeconomics, energy markets, Bayesian analysis, and the transmission of monetary policy.

She is on the board of editors of the American Economic Review. Her work has been cited over 9000 times and she is the 114th-most-cited female economist worldwide. She is a research associate at the NBER.

== Career ==
Baumeister earned her doctorate in economics at Ghent University in Belgium. She began her career as a researcher at the Bank of Canada, where she worked on international economic analysis. In July 2015, she joined the University of Notre Dame as a professor of economics and later became associate chair of the department.

She is also a research associate at the National Bureau of Economic Research and a research fellow at the Centre for Economic Policy Research. In addition, Baumeister holds research positions with the Deutsche Bundesbank Research Center and the University of Pretoria.

== Research and publications ==
Baumeister has published widely on macroeconomic forecasting, energy prices, and oil market dynamics. Her research often examines how oil price shocks affect the broader economy and how to recover market expectations from financial data. She worked on structural vector autoregressions, which has influenced how economists interpret monetary policy and oil price fluctuations. She has also co-authored empirical articles on tracking weekly economic conditions and energy markets and global economic conditions.

In a 2025 survey reported by the Financial Times, Baumeister warned that political attacks on the Federal Reserve risk undermining its independence and could turn the central bank into an instrument of government policy. She is also the cofounder of market analysis company Commodia.
