= Inter-American Development Bank =

International organization for financing infrastructure development in Latin America

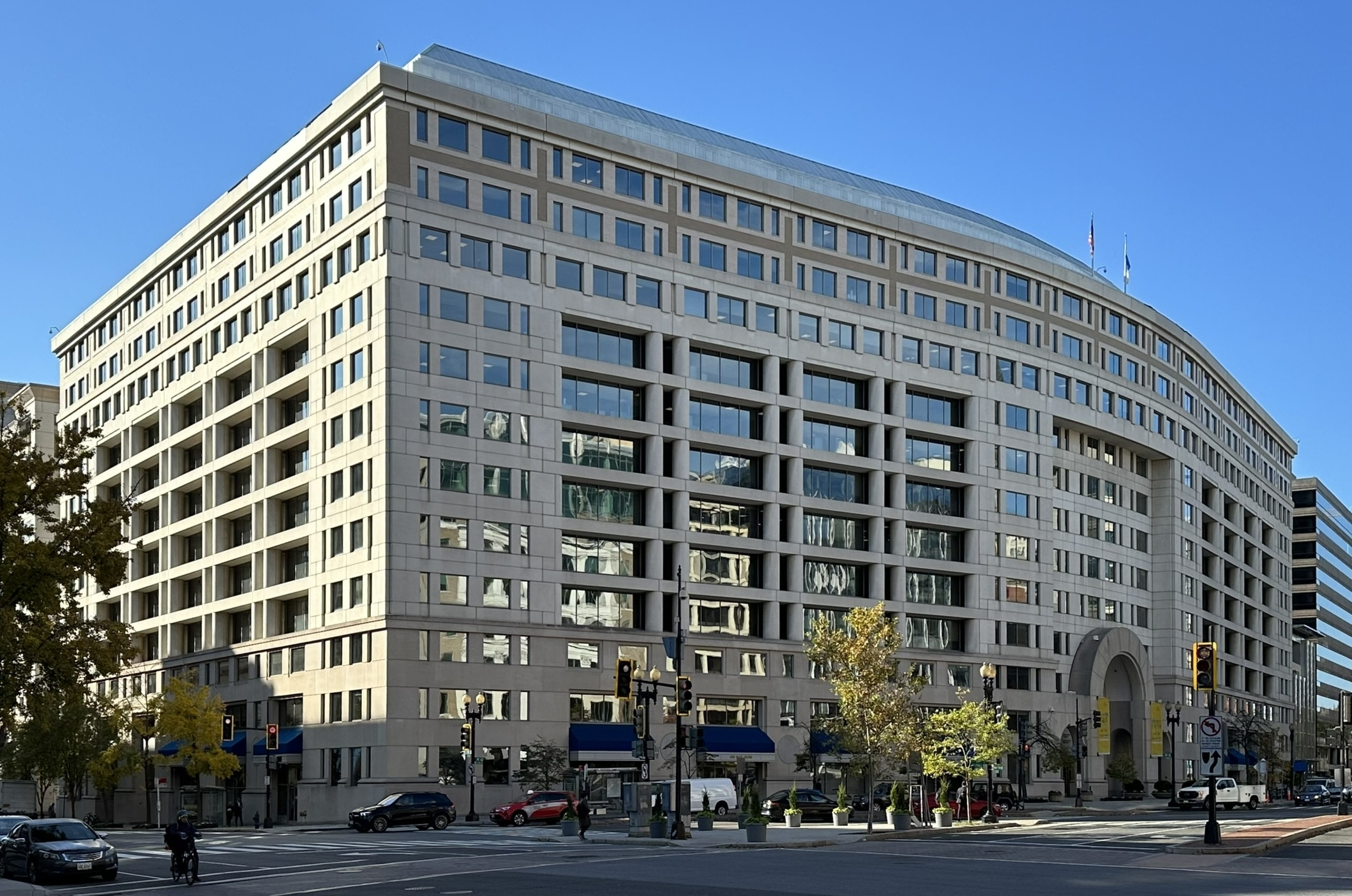
- IDB Headquarters in Washington, D.C.
- Abbreviation: IDB/BID
- Established: 1959
- Type: International organization
- Headquarters: 1300 New York Avenue NW; Washington, D.C. United States
- Members: 48 countries
- Official language: English, French, Portuguese, Spanish
- President: Ilan Goldfajn
- Main organ: Board of Governors
- Staff: About 2,000
- Website: www.iadb.org

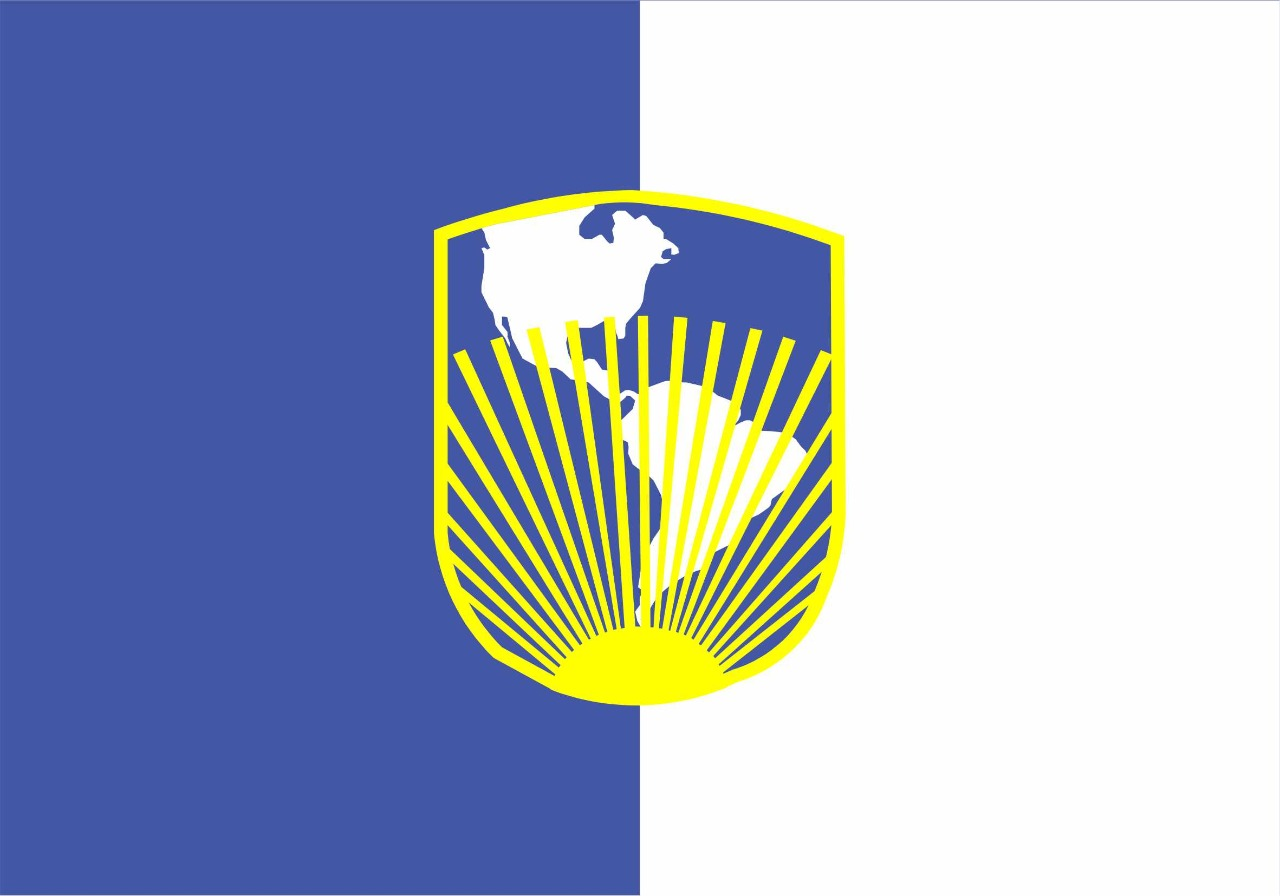
IDB flag.

The Inter-American Development Bank (IDB or IADB) is an international development finance institution headquartered in Washington, D.C., United States. It serves as one of the leading sources of development financing for the countries of Latin America and the Caribbean. Established in 1959, the IDB supports Latin American and Caribbean economic, social, and institutional development and regional integration by lending to governments and sub-national agencies, developing new financial tools, creating enabling conditions for private-sector-led growth, convening and aligning countries around common interests, and bridging the region with the rest of the world.

The IDB also provides extensive technical assistance to its borrowing member countries. It works across a range of sectors, including infrastructure, health, education, energy, citizen security, environmental sustainability, trade, transportation, housing, and small businesses.

It works in conjunction with IDB Invest, which pursues development by supporting the region's private sector through lending, mobilization, and advisory services. IDB Lab is the Bank's entrepreneurial innovation and venture-capital arm.

== History ==
At the First Pan-American Conference in 1890, the idea of a development institution for Latin America was first suggested during the earliest efforts to create an inter-American system. The IDB became a reality under an initiative proposed by President Juscelino Kubitschek of Brazil. The Bank was formally created on April 8, 1959, when the Organization of American States drafted the Articles of Agreement establishing the Inter-American Development Bank.

== Operations ==
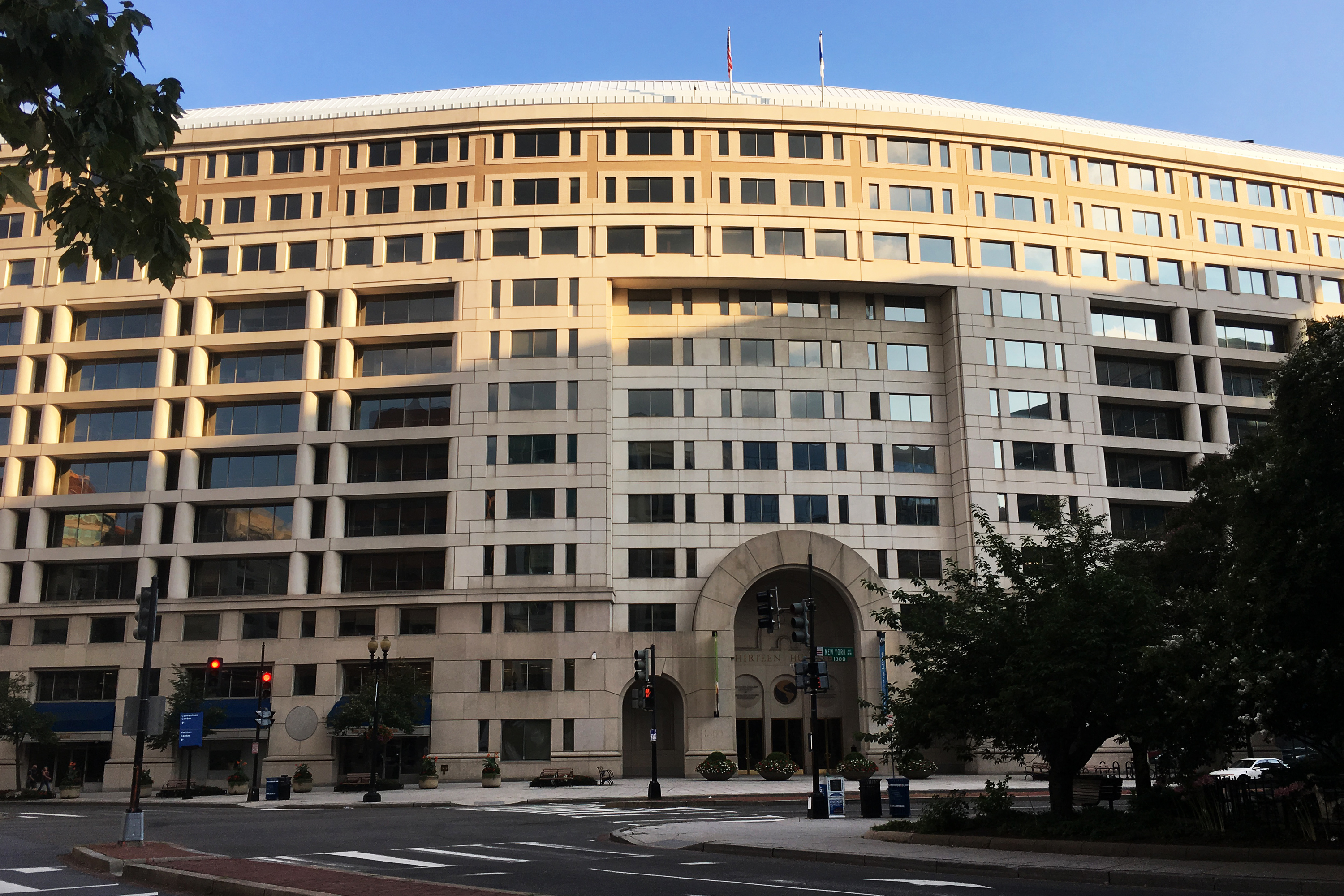
Main building of the Inter-American Development Bank headquarters at Washington, D.C.

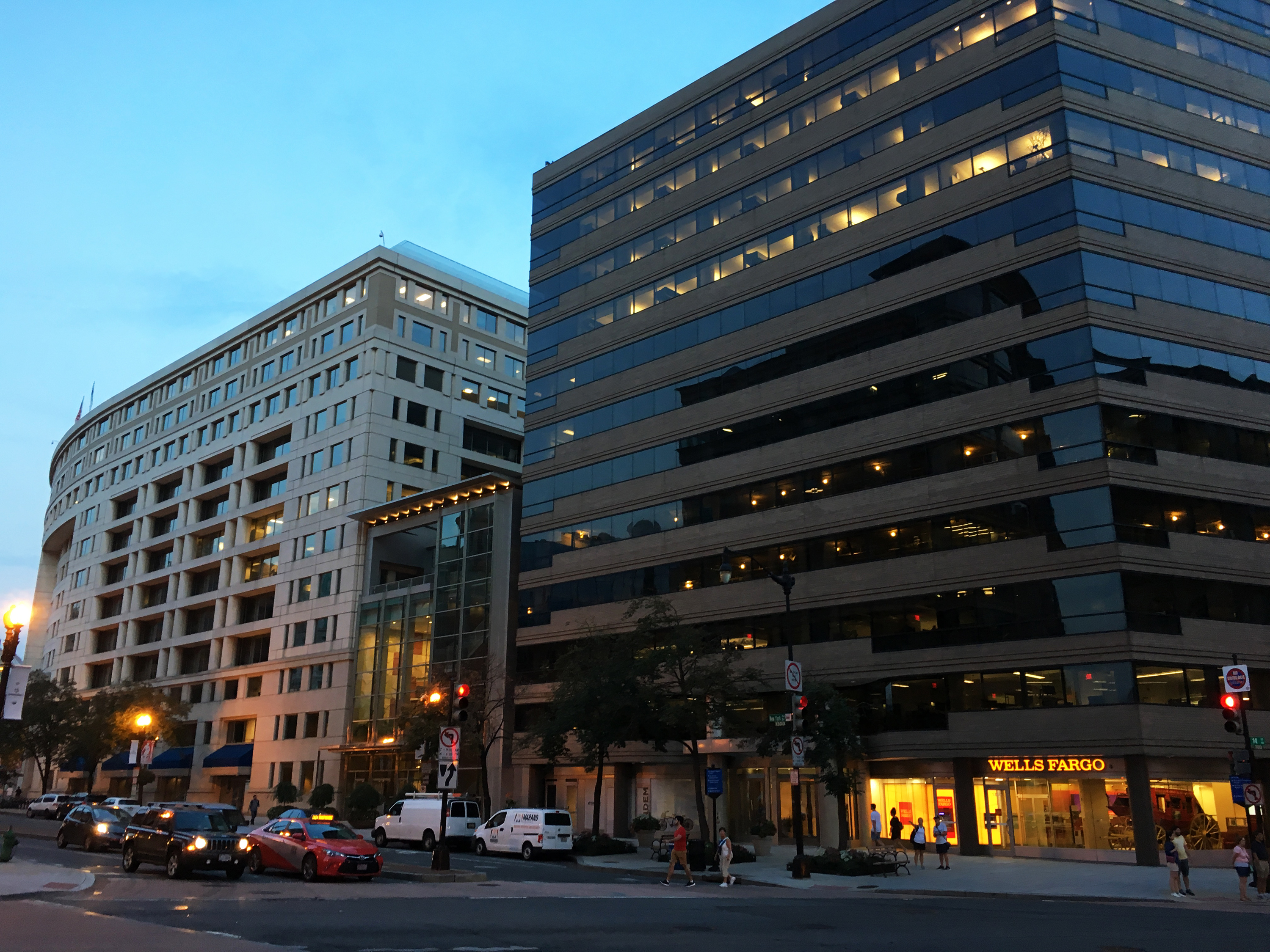
Inter-American Development Bank headquarters at Washington, D.C., left, the 1300 New York Ave NW building and right, the 1350 New York Ave. NW, Washington D.C. The Enrique V. Iglesias Auditorium is in the middle.

The IDB is one of the largest multilateral sources of financing for the Latin America and the Caribbean region. The IDB provides loans to borrowing member countries at standard commercial rates of interest, and has preferred creditor status, meaning that borrowers will repay loans to the IDB before repaying other obligations to other lenders such as commercial banks.

The IDB has four official languages: English, Spanish, Portuguese and French. Its official names in the other three languages are as follows:

Language	Name
Spanish	Banco Interamericano de Desarrollo (BID)
Portuguese	Banco Interamericano de Desenvolvimento (BID)
French	Banque interaméricaine de développement (BID)

=== Governance ===
The IDB is governed by its Board of Governors, composed of representatives of the Bank's 48 member countries. The Governors are usually finance ministers or other senior economic officials. The Board gathers at an Annual Meeting in March or April to review the Bank’s operations and make major policy decisions.

The developing countries that borrow from the IDB are the majority shareholders, and therefore control the majority of the decision-making bodies of the Bank. Each member's voting power is determined by its shareholding: its subscription to the Bank's ordinary capital. The United States holds 30 percent of the Bank's shares, while the countries of Latin America and the Caribbean combined hold 50.02 percent, with another 20% held by member countries in Europe and Asia. This arrangement is unique in that the developing member countries, as a group, are the majority shareholders. Though this arrangement was first viewed as risky, it is believed by some that strict peer pressure prevents the borrowers from defaulting, even when under severe economic pressure.

=== Presidents ===
Name	Years of Tenure
(Chile) Felipe Herrera	1960–1970
(Mexico) Antonio Ortiz Mena	1971–1988
(Uruguay) Enrique V. Iglesias	1988–2005
(Colombia) Luis Alberto Moreno	2005–2020
(United States) Mauricio Claver-Carone	2020–2022
(Honduras) Reina Irene Mejía (acting)	2022
(Brazil) Ilan Goldfajn	2022–present

Mauricio Claver-Carone was removed by the governors of IDB after an ethics investigation found that he had an affair with a subordinate and gave her a pay raise. The affair allegedly occurred during Claver-Carone's tenure on the National Security Council during the Trump administration.

Ilan Goldfajn of Brazil was elected on November 20, 2022, and assumed his responsibilities as president on December 19, 2022.

=== Mission ===
The Bank's mission and slogan is "improving lives." At its 2024 Annual Meetings, the IDB Board approved a new institutional strategy, predicated on boosting the impact and scale of the Bank's development work through reforms. The strategy's three core objectives are reducing poverty and inequality, addressing climate change, and bolstering sustainable growth. The Board also approved a doubling of IDB Invest's capital and a new business model, "originate to share," that aims to significantly increase its ability to mobilize private capital for development projects. IDB Lab reforms and a replenishment were also approved. The three major approvals have been dubbed "IDBImpact+" by the Bank.

== Financial resources ==
The callable capital pledged by the 22 non-borrowing members, which include the world's wealthiest developed countries, therefore functions as a guarantee for the bonds that the IDB sells. This arrangement ensures that the IDB maintains a triple-A credit rating, and as a result can make loans to its borrowing member countries at rates of interest similar to those that commercial banks charge their largest corporate borrowers. At the same time, the 22 non-borrowing countries are only putting up guarantees – not actual funds – so their support of the IDB's lending operations has a minimal impact on their national budgets.

The funds that the IDB lends are raised by selling bonds to institutional investors at standard commercial rates of interest. The bonds are backed by (a) the sum of the capital subscriptions actually paid in by the Bank's 48 member countries, plus (b) the sum of the callable capital subscriptions pledged by the Bank's 22 non-borrowing member countries. Together these constitute the Bank's ordinary capital, some $101 billion. Of this amount, 4.3 percent is paid in, while the remaining 95.7 percent is callable.

According to the IDB's 2023 Annual Report, the Bank approved 92 sovereign-guaranteed loan projects for $12.7 billion in total financing that year. According to IDB Invest, it had a "record year" in 2023, with total activity surpassing $10 billion, including $5.3 billion in mobilized resources from private investors. In 2025, IDB President Ilan Goldfajn announced the intention to increase financing capacity by an additional $130 billion over a decade.

According to the IDB's own measurements for 2024, 76% of IDB loan approvals, 94% of IDB Invest commitments and 96% of IDB Lab approvals supported sustainable economic growth in Latin America and the Caribbean.

=== Country status ===
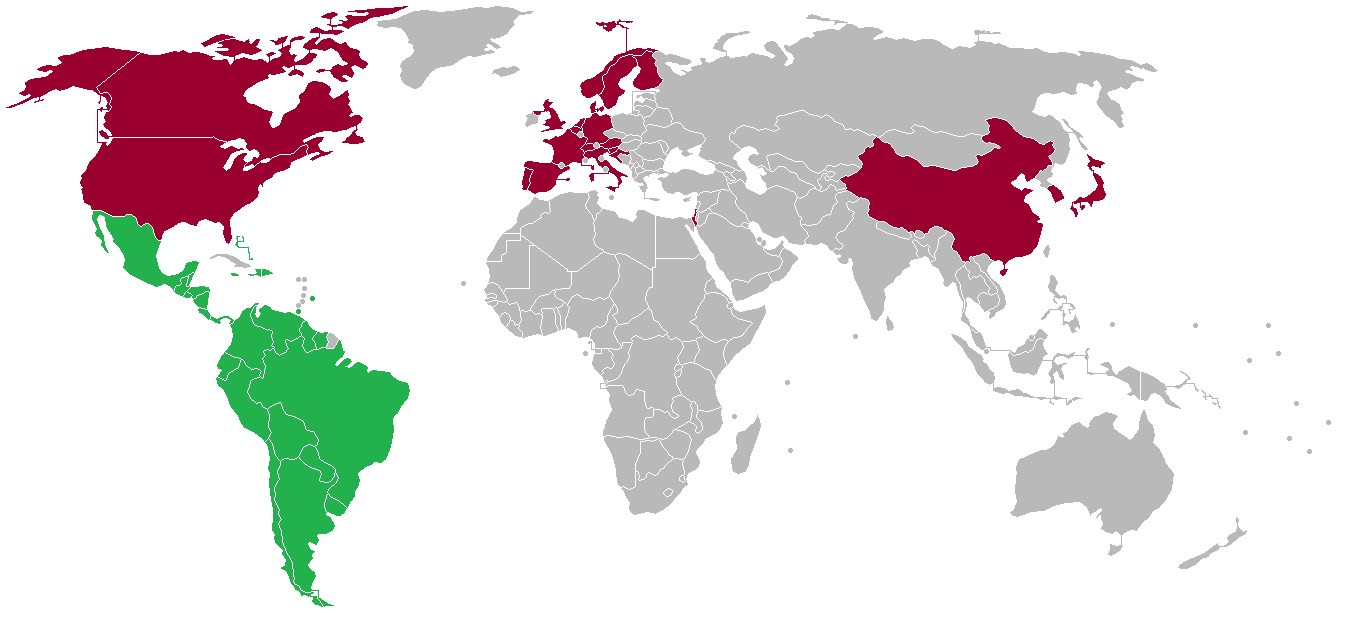
Borrowing members in green, non-borrowing members in red

The Bank is owned by 48 sovereign states, which are its shareholders and members. Only the 26 borrowing countries are able to receive loans.

Borrowing	Non-borrowing
Argentina	Austria
Bahamas	Belgium
Barbados	Canada
Belize	People's Republic of China
Bolivia	Croatia
Brazil	Denmark
Chile	Finland
Colombia	France
Costa Rica	Germany
Dominican Republic	Israel
Ecuador	Italy
El Salvador	Japan
Guatemala	South Korea
Guyana	Netherlands
Haiti	Norway
Honduras	Portugal
Jamaica	Slovenia
Mexico	Spain
Nicaragua	Sweden
Panama	Switzerland
Paraguay	United Kingdom
Peru	United States
Suriname	
Trinidad and Tobago	
Uruguay	
Venezuela	

=== Latest capital increases ===
On July 21, 2010, the Board of Governors agreed to increase the Bank's ordinary capital by $70 billion, the largest expansion of resources in the Bank's history, and to provide an unprecedented package of financial support to Haiti. The agreement also includes a replenishment of the Fund for Special Operations, which finances operations in the region's poorest nations.

A recapitalization and new, pro-mobilization business model for IDB Invest was approved in 2024.

== Priority areas ==
According to the Bank's latest institutional strategy, it works in seven focus areas: 1. biodiversity, natural capital, and climate action; 2. gender equality and inclusion of diverse population groups; 3. institutional capacity, rule of law, and citizen security; 4. social protection and human capital development; 5. sustainable, resilient, and inclusive infrastructure; 6. productive development and innovation through the private sector; 7. regional integration.

== Criticisms ==
There are claims that operations funded by the IDB may have adverse impacts on local environments and indigenous peoples. According to the Bank Information Center (BIC), "civil society groups have long been concerned about the negative impacts the IDB's operations have on the environment and on indigenous and traditional peoples, as well as on the prospects for genuine economic and democratic reform in the region". The BIC cites environmental and social damage funded by the IDB as adversely impacting local economies, contrary to IDB's stated goal of fostering social and economic prosperity.

== Member state comparison table ==
The following table are amounts for 20 largest countries by subscribed capital stock, voting power, and FSO contribution quotas at the Inter-American Development Bank as of December 2020.

The 20 largest countries by subscribed capital and voting power at the Inter-American Development Bank
Rank	Country	Ordinary capital subscribed capital stock (millions US$)	Rank	Country	Voting power (% of total)	Rank	Country	FSO contribution quotas (millions US$)
	World	176,754.0		World	100.000		World	10,239.9
1	United States	54,237.1	1	United States	30.006	1	United States	5,076.4
2	Brazil	19,740.9	2	Brazil	11.354		European Union	1,315.2
3	Argentina	19,718.7	2	Argentina	11.354	2	Japan	623.3
	European Union	16,322.5		European Union	9.207	3	Brazil	573.2
4	Mexico	12,678.4	4	Mexico	7.299	4	Argentina	532.2
5	Japan	8,877.5	5	Japan	5.001	5	Mexico	346.4
6	Canada	7,025.0	6	Canada	4.001	6	Canada	328.9
7	Venezuela	5,988.8	7	Venezuela	3.403	7	Venezuela	315.3
8	Chile	5,425.9	8	Chile	3.119	8	Germany	241.3
9	Colombia	5,423.0	8	Colombia	3.119	9	France	232.8
10	Italy	3,480.1	10	Italy	1.965	10	Italy	227.2
11	Spain	3,479.2	10	Spain	1.965	11	Spain	226.4
12	Germany	3,368.7	12	Germany	1.896	12	United Kingdom	183.9
13	France	3,364.2	12	France	1.896	13	Chile	166.1
14	Peru	2,646.3	14	Peru	1.521	14	Colombia	161.2
15	Uruguay	2,115.9	15	Uruguay	1.219	15	China	131.1
16	United Kingdom	1,744.8	16	United Kingdom	0.964	16	Peru	84.0
17	Bolivia	1,588.3	17	Bolivia	0.913	17	Switzerland	67.1
18	Dominican Republic	1,061.3	18	Dominican Republic	0.610	18	Uruguay	58.7
19	Ecuador	1,056.6	19	Ecuador	0.608	19	Bolivia	51.1
20	Guatemala	1,005.2	20	Guatemala	0.577	20	Belgium	44.6
			20	Jamaica	0.577			

== See also ==
- Bank of the South
- CAF – Development Bank of Latin America and the Caribbean
- Caribbean Development Bank
- Development in the Americas
- United Nations Economic Commission for Latin America and the Caribbean (UNECLAC)
