= Greenbook =

Publication of United States economic projections

The Greenbook of the Federal Reserve Board of Governors (called the Greenbook for short) is a book with projections of various economic indicators for the economy of the United States produced by the Federal Reserve Board before each meeting of the Federal Open Market Committee. The projections are referred to as Greenbook projections or Greenbook forecasts. Many of the variables projected coincide with variables covered in the Survey of Professional Forecasters.

== Details ==
Prior to each meeting of the Federal Open Market Committee, projections are made about macroeconomic indicators for the economy of the United States. The meetings are held at a frequency slightly greater than one a month. These projections are recorded in "Greensheets" and all the Greensheets for a given year are compiled into the Greenbook of that year. The Greensheets are kept confidential within the committee at the time of creation.

Each Greenbook is made available to the public five years after the end of the year of the Greenbook. For instance, as of April 2014, Greenbooks from 1966 to 2008 are available on the website of the Federal Reserve Bank of Philadelphia.

A Greenbook data set in Microsoft Excel format is also available on the Federal Reserve Bank of Philadelphia website. This includes only four quarterly Greenbook projections in order to maximize the correspondence and comparability with the Survey of Professional Forecasters.

In addition to the main projections, supplementary documents describing the output gap and financial assumptions made in the projections are also available on the Federal Reserve Bank of Philadelphia website.

== Reception ==
=== Academic reception ===
Some academic publications by the Federal Reserve Board have looked at the historical track record of accuracy of the Greenbook projections as well as their output gap estimates.

The Greenbook forecast has also attracted the attention of outside academic researchers. A 2007 National Bureau of Economic Research paper by Faust and Wright finds: "For inflation we find that univariate methods are dominated by the best atheoretical large dataset methods and that these, in turn, are dominated by Greenbook. For GDP growth, in contrast, we find that once one takes account of Greenbook's advantage in evaluating the current state of the economy, neither large dataset methods nor the Greenbook process offers much advantage over a univariate autoregressive forecast."

A 2014 paper by Arai in the International Journal of Forecasting finds: "Using this [Patton and Timmerman (2012) forecast adjustment] method in a real-time out-of-sample forecasting exercise, I find that it provides modest improvements in the accuracies of the forecasts for the GDP deflator and CPI, but not for other variables. The improvements are statistically significant in some cases, with magnitudes of up to 18% in root mean square prediction error."
