= Charles Plosser =

American economist (1948–2025)

Charles I. Plosser
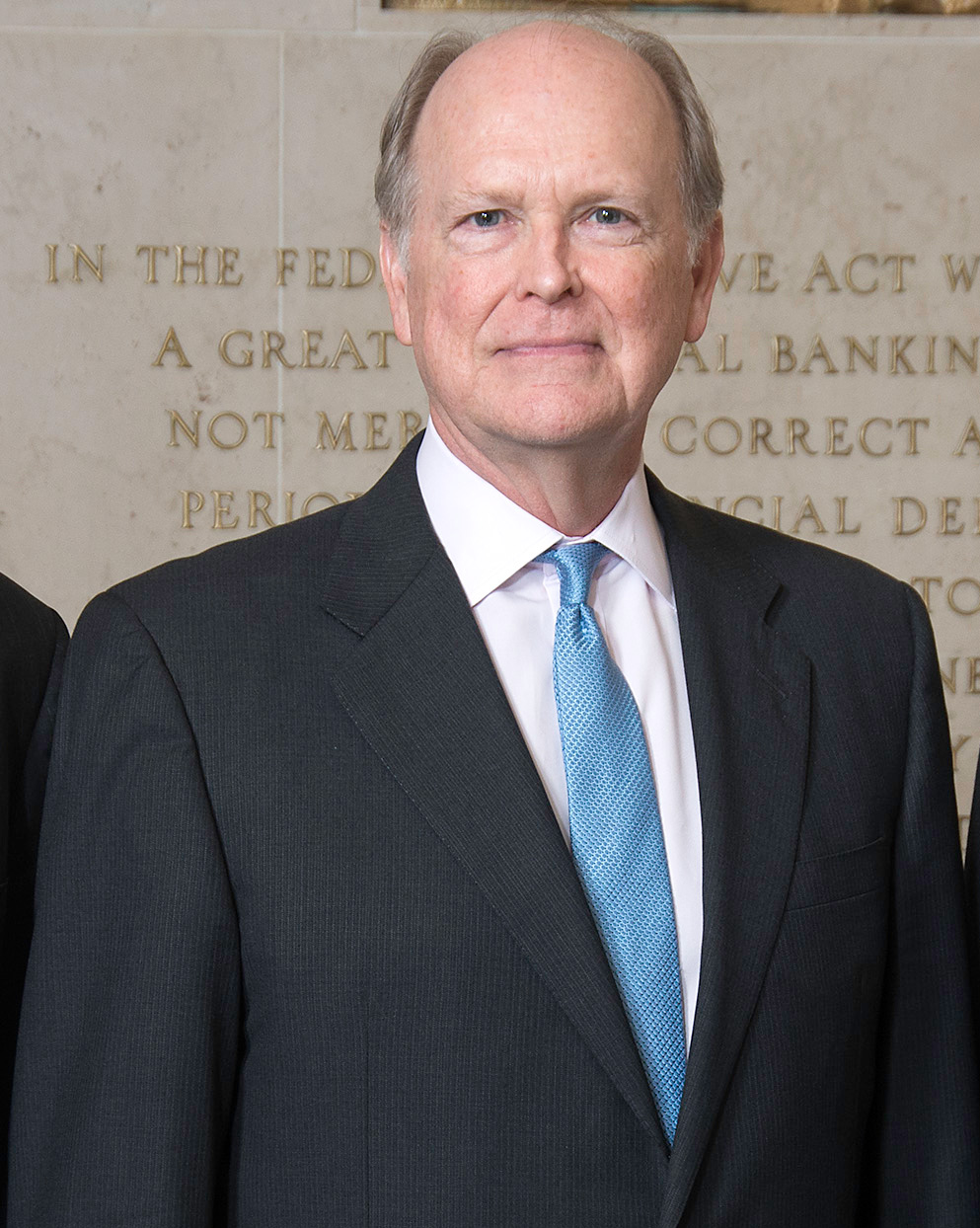

11th President of the Federal Reserve Bank of Philadelphia
- In office August 1, 2006 – March 1, 2015
- Preceded by: Anthony Santomero
- Succeeded by: Patrick T. Harker

Personal details
- Born: September 19, 1948 Birmingham, Alabama, U.S.
- Died: August 14, 2025 (aged 76)
- Education: Vanderbilt University (BS); University of Chicago (MBA, PhD)

Academic background
- Doctoral advisor: Arnold Zellner

Academic work
- Discipline: Macroeconomics
- Institutions: University of Rochester
- Notable ideas: Real business-cycle theory
- Website: Information at IDEAS / RePEc

Charles Irving Plosser (/ˈplɑːsər/; September 19, 1948 – August 14, 2025) was an American economist who was president of the Federal Reserve Bank of Philadelphia from August 1, 2006, to March 1, 2015. An academic macroeconomist, he is well known for his work on real business cycles, a term which he and John B. Long, Jr. coined. Specifically, he wrote along with Charles R. Nelson in 1982 an influential work entitled "Trends and Random Walks in Macroeconomic Time Series" in which they dealt with the hypothesis of permanent shocks affecting the aggregate product (GDP).

== Life and career ==
Plosser was born in Birmingham, Alabama, and graduated from Indian Springs School in Indian Springs, Alabama. He earned a bachelor of engineering degree from Vanderbilt University in 1970, and Ph.D. and M.B.A. degrees from the University of Chicago in 1976 and 1972, respectively.

Before joining the Philadelphia Fed, Plosser was the dean of the William E. Simon Graduate School of Business Administration at the University of Rochester for 12 years. He also served concurrently as the school's John M. Olin Distinguished Professor of Economics and Public Policy. Plosser was also the co-editor of the Journal of Monetary Economics for over 20 years.

Plosser died on August 14, 2025, at the age of 76.

== Selected bibliography ==
- Charles R. Nelson and Charles I. Plosser, September, 1982. "Trends and Random Walks in Macroeconmic [sic] Time Series: Some Evidence and Implications," Journal of Monetary Economics, 10(2), pp. 139–162. Abstract.
- John B. Long, Jr. and Charles I. Plosser, 1983. "Real Business Cycles" Journal of Political Economy, 91(1), pp. 39-69 (press +).
- Robert G. King and Charles I. Plosser, 1984. "Money, Credit, and Prices in a Real Business Cycle," American Economic Review, 74(3), p p. 363-380. Reprinted in Finn E. Kydland, ed., 1995. Business Cycle Theory, pp. 136-55.
- Robert G. King, Charles I. Plosser, and Sergio T. Rebelo, 1988. "Production, Growth, and Business Cycles: I. The Basic Neoclassical Model," Journal of Monetary Economics, 21(2–3), pp. 195–232. Abstract.
- Charles I. Plosser, 1989. "Understanding Real Business Cycles," Journal of Economic Perspectives, 3(3), pp. 51-77 (press +).
- Charles I. Plosser (1996). Essays in Honor of Carl Christ. Elsevier.

Academic offices
Preceded by Paul MacAvoy	Dean of the William E. Simon Graduate School of Business Administration; Acting; 1990–1991	Succeeded by Paul MacAvoy
Preceded by Paul MacAvoy	Dean of the William E. Simon Graduate School of Business Administration; 1992–2003	Vacant Title next held by Mark A. Zupan
Other offices
Preceded by Anthony Santomero	President of the Federal Reserve Bank of Philadelphia; 2006–2015	Succeeded by Patrick T. Harker
