= Development in the Americas =

Annual report of research published by the Inter-American Development Bank

Development in the Americas (DIA)
- Development in the Americas DIA, Better Spending for Better Lives cover
- Country: United States
- Language: English
- Publisher: Inter-American Development Bank
- Published: 2018-09-16
- Published in English: 2018-09-16
- Media type: Digital
- No. of books: 10
- Website: Publisher website

Development in the Americas (DIA) is the flagship publication series of the Inter-American Development Bank. Published annually, the report contains the results of research compiled over a span of two to three years related to economic development in Latin America and the Caribbean. Reports have included topics such as tax systems, education, public spending, childhood development, productive development policy, saving, information technology, productivity, and quality of life.

== Development in the Americas 2018 ==
The 2018 DIA, "Better Spending for Better Lives," analyzes government spending in Latin America and the Caribbean. The research details widespread waste and inefficiencies that could be as large as 4.4 percent of the region’s GDP, suggesting there is room to improve services without increasing expenditures. The report provides policy recommendations on how to improve the efficiency of government spending. It argues against across-the-board cuts and suggests countries re-align their spending to meet priorities, including taking into account if given expenditures increase or decrease inequality.

== Development in the Americas 2017 ==
The 2017 DIA, "Learning Better: Public Policy for Skills Development," documents the state of education in Latin America and the Caribbean, finding deficiencies in education which include years of completed schooling, educational attainment, academic achievement as measured by PISA scores, and equality in access to education. These deficiencies in turn result in skills deficits that impede countries’ attempts to shrink a large informal sector and their efforts to participate in a knowledge economy. The report advocates increasing efficiency in educational spending and support of lifelong learning through apprenticeships and on-the-job training as well as formal education.

== Development in the Americas 2016 ==
The 2016 DIA, "Saving for Development: How Latin America and the Caribbean Can Save More and Better," documents the longstanding problem of the region’s low savings rates, including domestic savings. The report identifies three systemic sources of low saving: small and inefficient financial sectors, private pension funds that fail to encourage adequate worker contributions, and governments’ tendency to favor current spending to the detriment of public investment. In addition to systemic improvements, the report advocates the promotion of financial literacy to increase saving.

== Previous Reports 2008-2015 ==
- 2015 The Early Years: Child Well-being and the Role of Public Policy
- 2014 Rethinking Productive Development: Sound Policies and Institutions for Economic Transformation
- 2013 More than Revenue: Taxation as a Development Tool
- 2012 Room for Development: Housing Markets in Latin America and the Caribbean
- 2011 Development Connections: Unveiling the Impact of New Information Technologies
- 2010 The Age of Productivity: Transforming Economies from the Bottom Up
- 2009 Beyond Facts: Understanding Quality of Life

== See also ==
- World Development Report – World Bank
- African Economic Outlook – African Development Bank
- Asian Development Outlook – Asian Development Bank
- World Health Report – WHO
- Human Development Report – UNDP
- The State of the World's Children – UNICEF
- SMS social monitoring tool - U-Report
