= Patrick T. Harker =

President of the University of Delaware

Patrick Harker

26th President of the University of Delaware
- In office 2007–2015
- Preceded by: David Roselle
- Succeeded by: Dennis Assanis

11th President of the Federal Reserve Bank of Philadelphia
- In office July 1, 2015 – June 30, 2025
- Preceded by: Charles Plosser
- Succeeded by: Anna Paulson

Personal details
- Born: Patrick Timothy Harker; November 19, 1958 (age 67)
- Spouse: Emily Saaty
- Education: University of Pennsylvania (BS, MS, MA, PhD)

Patrick Timothy Harker (born November 19, 1958) is an American engineer and administrator who served as the President of the Federal Reserve Bank of Philadelphia from 2015 to 2025. He previously served as the 26th president of the University of Delaware from 2007 to 2015 and as dean of the Wharton School of the University of Pennsylvania from 2001 to 2007. He currently serves as Rowan Distinguished Professor, Professor of Operations, Information and Decisions at the Wharton School of the University of Pennsylvania and as Director of Academic Engagement for Penn Washington.

== Early life and education ==
Harker grew up in Gloucester City, New Jersey. He graduated from St. Mary's School in Gloucester City in 1973, and was a scholar athlete at Gloucester Catholic High School.

Harker received a Ph.D. from the University of Pennsylvania in 1983.

== Career ==
Harker worked as a consulting engineer in Philadelphia and New York City. He was a faculty member of the University of California, Santa Barbara from 1983–1984.

Harker was named a Presidential Young Investigator by the National Science Foundation in 1986 and as a White House Fellow by President George H.W. Bush in 1991. In the latter position, he spent 1991-1992 as a Special Assistant to the Director of the Federal Bureau of Investigation.

=== University of Pennsylvania ===
Harker joined the Wharton School of the University of Pennsylvania in 1984. From 1994 to 1996, Harker served as a professor and Chair of the Systems Engineering Department in Penn's School of Engineering and Applied Science.

Harker served as chair of Wharton School's Operations and Information Management Department. In February 2000, he was appointed dean of the Wharton School and Reliance Professor of Management and Private Enterprise. He was a senior fellow at the Wharton Financial Institutions Center and held a secondary appointment as a professor of Electrical and Systems Engineering at Penn. He also served as director of the school's Fishman-Davidson Center for the Study of the Service Sector. When he was named UPS Transportation Professor of the Private Sector in 1991, Harker became the youngest faculty member in Wharton’s history awarded an endowed professorship.

While at Penn, Harker supervised the work of 18 Ph.D. candidates and four Master's students. Also at Penn, he was principal investigator or co-principal investigator on 16 research grants totaling more than $11 million.

=== University of Delaware ===
Harker was selected as the 26th President of the University of Delaware on December 1, 2006. He took office on July 1, 2007.

In 2008, UD had partnered with the some health care providers in the Delaware Health Sciences Alliance.

During his tenure as president, the University of Delaware acquired a 272-acre property adjacent to the Newark campus that is now being developed as the Science, Technology and Advanced Research (STAR) Campus. Future development of this campus is designed to establish it as a center of innovation, focused on leading research in areas such as health science, cybersecurity and alternative energy. Currently, the campus is home to UD's Health Sciences Complex, California-based Bloom Energy's East Coast fuel cell manufacturing center and the University's eV2g project, a two-way interface between electric vehicles and the electric grid.

Major construction projects on the campus since Harker became president include the 194,000-square-foot Interdisciplinary Science and Engineering Laboratory (ISE Lab), a hub for teaching and research on campus that now bears his name; Louis L. Redding and Eliphalet Gilbert Residence Halls; and a new University of Delaware Bookstore.

At the University of Delaware, Harker's compensation for the 2008–2009 fiscal year was $810,603. His pay for 2009–2010 was $726,307, and his pay for 2010–2011 was $728,329.

=== Federal Reserve Bank of Philadelphia ===
From 2015 to 2025, Dr. Harker was President and CEO of the Federal Reserve Bank of Philadelphia.

=== University of Pennsylvania ===
On July 1, 2025, Harker became Rowan Distinguished Professor, Professor of Operations, Information and Decisions at the Wharton School of the University of Pennsylvania and Director of Academic Engagement for Penn Washington.

== Social engagement ==
In 2012, Harker was named a charter fellow of the National Academy of Inventors for his outstanding personal contributions to innovation and for facilitating and nurturing patents, licensing and commercialization for the purpose of economic development for the University and the state of Delaware.

He received the INFORMS Fellows Award in recognition of outstanding lifetime achievement in operations research and the management sciences in 2012. He was recognized "for remarkable leadership at the organizations he leads and for his contributions to the theory of variational inequalities and his editorial services to INFORMS." The Institute for Operations Research and the Management Sciences (INFORMS) is an international scientific society with 10,000 members.

Harker was a Class B director of the Federal Reserve Bank of Philadelphia until he was appointed as the Bank's President and a member of the Homeland Security Academic Advisory Council. He served on the boards of Christiana Care Health Systems, First State Innovation, Catholic Relief Services, Easter Seals of Delaware, Decision Lens, Pepco Holdings, Huntsman Corp. and The Minerva Project, as well as many other community and nonprofit groups.

His op-eds have been published in The Wall Street Journal, The New York Times, Fortune, The Chronicle of Higher Education, The Philadelphia Inquirer and The (Delaware) News Journal. In December 2014, his commentary, "Making Sense of Higher Education's Future: An Economics and Operations Perspective," was published in Service Science.

Other offices
| Preceded by Charles Plosser | President of the Federal Reserve Bank of Philadelphia; 2015–2025 | Succeeded by Anna Paulson |
