= CAF – Development Bank of Latin America and the Caribbean =

Latin American development bank

CAF – Development Bank of Latin America and the Caribbean (CAF): CAF – Banco de Desenvolvimento da América Latina e Caribe (Portuguese); CAF – Banco de Desarrollo de América Latina y el Caribe (Spanish)
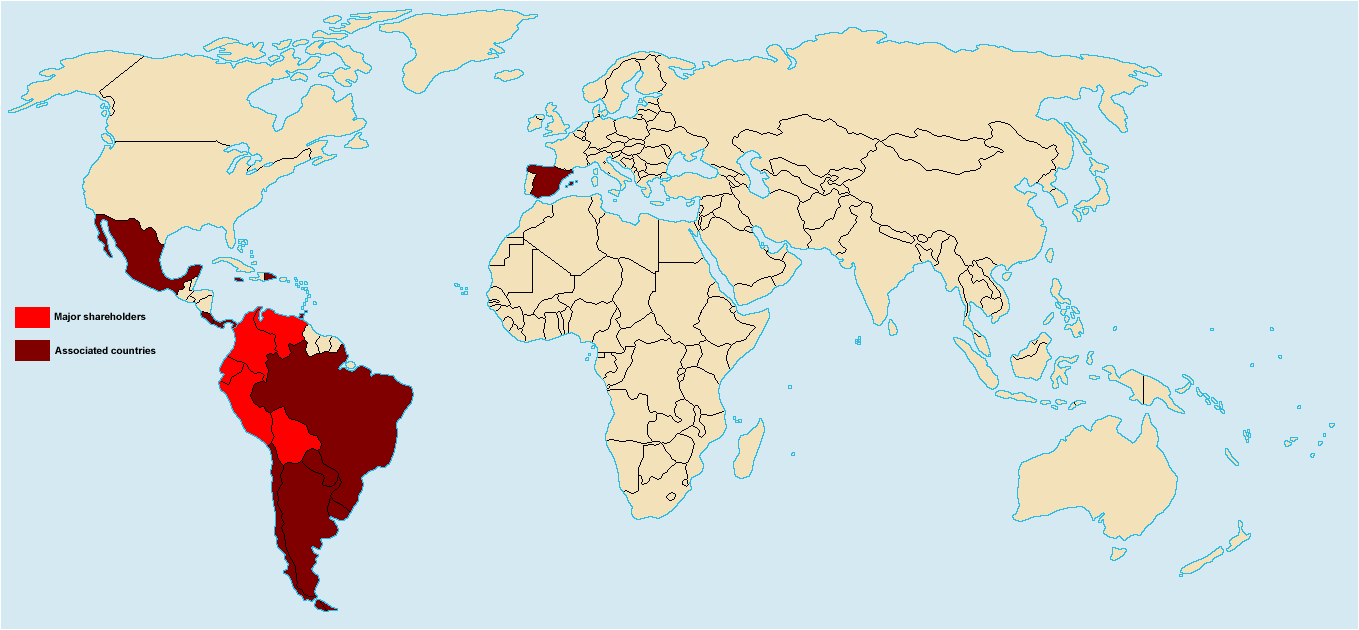
- Map indicating CAF members.
- Headquarters: Caracas, Venezuela
- Largest shareholder countries: Multilateral development bank
- Membership: 25 members

Leaders
  - President: Sergio Diaz-Granados Guida
  - Executive Vice President: Carolina España
- Establishment: February 7, 1968; 57 years ago
- Website www.caf.com

CAF – Development Bank of Latin America and the Caribbean, formerly the Andean Development Corporation (Spanish: Corporación Andina de Fomento), is a Caracas-based development bank whose mission is to promote sustainable development and regional integration in Latin America and the Caribbean, through the financing of projects of the public and private sectors, the provision of technical cooperation and other specialized services.

Established on February 7, 1968, it commenced operations in June 1970. Currently composed of 23 countries from Latin America, the Caribbean, Europe, and 13 private banks, it stands as one of the principal sources of multilateral financing and a significant knowledge generator for the region.

CAF is a multilateral financial institution whose mission is to support the sustainable development of its shareholder countries and regional integration. It serves the public and private sectors, providing multiple financial products and services to a broad client portfolio, made up of the governments of the shareholder states, financial institutions and public and private companies.

Its primary activities encompass acting as a financial intermediary, channeling resources from industrialized nations to the region, funding the development of productive infrastructure, promoting overall development, fostering trade and investments, and supporting the business sector.

The CAF has its main headquarters in Caracas and offices in Asunción, Bogotá, Brasília, Buenos Aires, La Paz, Lima, Madrid, Mexico City, Montevideo, Panama City, Port of Spain, Quito, San Salvador, Santiago de Chile, Santo Domingo and São Paulo.

== History ==
The initiative that would lead to the establishment of CAF began to materialize in 1966, following the signing of the Bogotá Declaration by the presidents of Colombia, Chile, Venezuela, and the personal representatives of the heads of state of Ecuador and Peru. This declaration approved an immediate action program for the Andean countries and Chile, outlining measures for economic integration and the coordination of policies in trade, industry, finance, and technical cooperation services among the participating nations. In response to these needs, a Joint Commission was appointed to oversee these functions, proposing the creation of a development corporation, ultimately resulting in the formation of the Andean Development Corporation (CAF).

During 1967, the Joint Commission distinctly outlined the foundations of CAF. On February 7, 1968, the governments of the member countries signed the Constitutive Agreement at the San Carlos Palace in Bogotá, conceiving the entity as a multiple bank and agency for the promotion of development and Andean integration. Two years later, on June 8, 1970, CAF formally commenced operations, establishing its headquarters in Caracas, Venezuela.

The Cartagena Agreement, approved in May 1969 — one year after the Constitutive Agreement of CAF — established the political framework of the Andean subregional group and proposed the adoption of a joint model of economic, social and commercial development between countries that had similar characteristics. and that they sought to obtain the benefits that, in the regional integration scheme of the time (LAFTA), were generally reserved for the largest nations. To this end, it incorporated instruments related to the adoption of common strategies for industrial, energy, and agricultural development, as well as research and technological transfer, capital investment, construction of physical infrastructure and human trafficking, among others.

Bolivia and Ecuador were the first two countries that, in 1971, received loans from CAF for the execution of projects related to the installation of a rice storage network (US$1.3 million) and the construction of a fishing complex for the capture and freezing of tropical tuna (US$0.5 million). However, the first loan that materialized the integrationist vocation of the Organization was made a year later, and was granted to a Venezuelan project (US$3 million). The objective of this project was the construction of a bridge over the Limón River, in the State of Zulia, with the purpose of facilitating road connections with Colombia.

The decision to open its share capital to other partners from Latin America and the Caribbean in the early nineties was a significant development that allowed for the expansion of both CAF's integrationist mission and its operational base beyond its then Andean borders.

Portugal was the 18th shareholder country to become part of the bank. The formalization of the incorporation of that country, through the subscription of €15 million to the ordinary capital of the institution and €60 million to the guarantee capital, was carried out within the framework of the XIX Ibero-American Summit of Heads of State and Government, in Estoril. Barbados was the 19th shareholder country to become part of the bank.

Currently, in addition to four countries of the Andean Community, its shareholders include: Argentina, Barbados, Bolivia, Brazil, Chile, Colombia, Costa Rica, Ecuador, Spain, Jamaica, Mexico, Panama, Paraguay, Peru, Portugal, Dominican Republic, Trinidad and Tobago, Uruguay, Venezuela, and 13 private banks in the region. On March 8, 2022, El Salvador joined as the 20th partner and the first as a full member. Honduras officially became a member on July 18, 2022, becoming the 21st partner. The Bahamas became a shareholder in November of 2024, and Antigua and Barbuda became member of the bank on May 2, 2025, joining as a "Series C Shareholder." In 2025, Saint Lucia and Guatemala joined the CAF as new Serie C shareholders, bringing its membership to 25 countries.

== Members ==
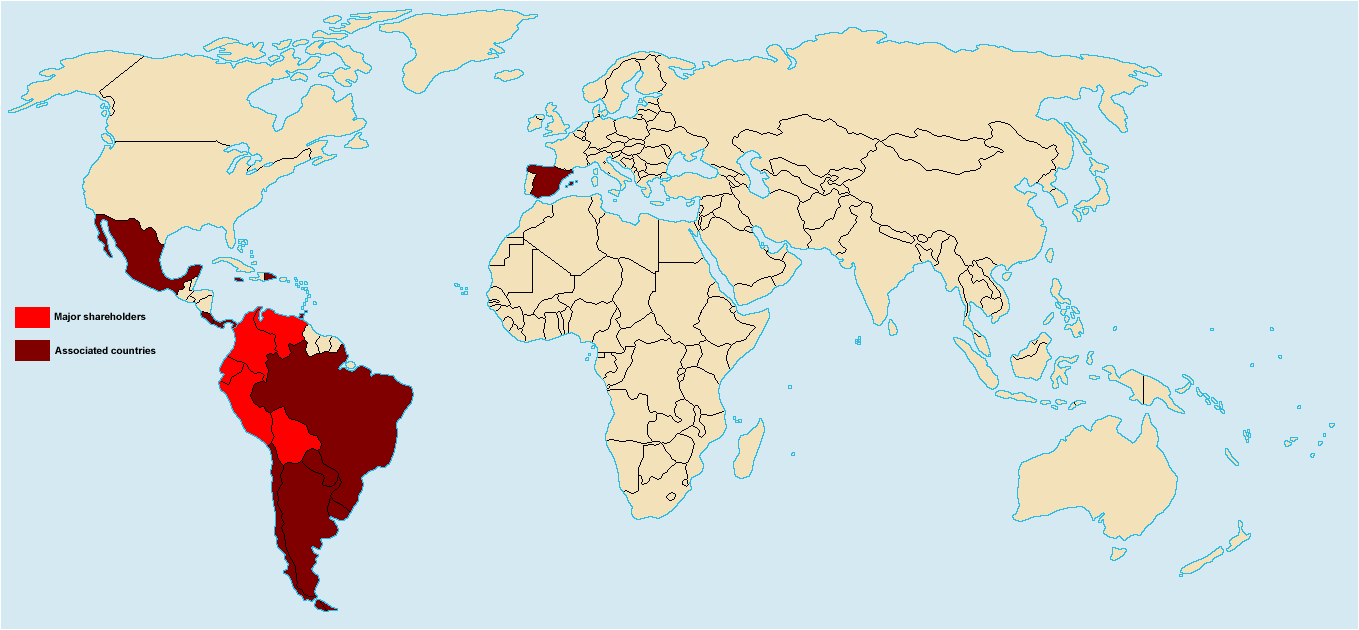
Corporación Andina de Fomento associate members major shareholders

=== Full members ===
- Argentina
- Bahamas
- Bolivia
- Brazil
- Chile
- Colombia
- Dominican Republic
- Ecuador
- El Salvador
- Honduras
- Panama
- Paraguay
- Peru
- Trinidad and Tobago
- Uruguay
- Venezuela

=== Members (shareholder category "C") ===
- Antigua and Barbuda
- Barbados
- Costa Rica
- Jamaica
- Mexico
- Portugal
- Spain
- Saint Lucia
- Guatemala

== See also ==
- Bank of the South
- Caribbean Development Bank
- Development in the Americas
- Economy of Latin America and the Caribbean
- United Nations Economic Commission for Latin America and the Caribbean (UNECLAC)
