= Anna Paulson (economist) =

American economist

President of the Federal Reserve Bank of Philadelphia
- Incumbent
- Assumed office July 1, 2025
- Preceded by: Patrick T. Harker

Personal details
- Born: 1964 or 1965 (age 61–62)
- Education: Carleton College (BA); University of Chicago (MA, PhD)

Anna Louise Paulson (born 1964/1965) is an American economist who is the 12th president of the Federal Reserve Bank of Philadelphia. She previously served as the executive vice president and director of research of the Federal Reserve Bank of Chicago.

Paulson is a member of the American Economic Association's Committee on the Status of Women in the Economics Profession, and a past board member of the Western Economic Association International.

Her research focuses on how households and firms cope with risk and incomplete financial markets, and how their financial decision-making is influenced by economic events.

== Career ==
Paulson was an assistant professor of finance at Northwestern University's Kellogg School of Management and a postdoctoral fellow at Princeton University before joining the Federal Reserve Bank of Chicago as an economist in 2001. She became a vice president in 2009, associate director of research in 2017, and director of research in 2019. She took office as president and chief executive officer of the Federal Reserve Bank of Philadelphia on July 1, 2025, succeeding Patrick T. Harker.

== Selected works ==
- Paulson, Anna L., and Robert Townsend. "Entrepreneurship and financial constraints in Thailand." Journal of Corporate Finance 10, no. 2 (2004): 229–262.
- Cole, Shawn, Anna Paulson, and Gauri Kartini Shastry. "Smart money? The effect of education on financial outcomes." The Review of Financial Studies 27, no. 7 (2014): 2022–2051.
- Paulson, Anna L., Robert M. Townsend, and Alexander Karaivanov. "Distinguishing limited liability from moral hazard in a model of entrepreneurship." Journal of political Economy 114, no. 1 (2006): 100–144.
- Cole, Shawn, Anna Paulson, and Gauri Kartini Shastry. "High school curriculum and financial outcomes: The impact of mandated personal finance and mathematics courses." Journal of Human Resources 51, no. 3 (2016): 656–698.
- Osili, Una Okonkwo, and Anna L. Paulson. "Institutions and financial development: Evidence from international migrants in the United States." The Review of Economics and Statistics 90, no. 3 (2008): 498–517.

Other offices
| Preceded by Patrick T. Harker | President of the Federal Reserve Bank of Philadelphia; 2025–present | Incumbent |
