= Best on the Street =

Best on the Street, earlier known as the All Star Analysts Survey is an annual survey-cum-contest of financial analysts in the United States conducted by The Wall Street Journal. Many financial firms participate in the survey and boast about the results on their websites.

== History ==
The survey has been conducted annually by The Wall Street Journal since 1993, but the first hard copy that survives is from the year 1997. The survey changed its name to Best on the Street in 1999 or 2000.

== Reception ==
=== Reception by financial analysts ===
Financial analysts vie for the accolades that obtain to them from performing well at Best on the Street. Examples of financial analysts that have listed good performance in the survey on their website are Morningstar, Inc., Raymond James Financial, and Keefe, Bruyette & Woods.

=== Academic reception ===
Best on the Street, both with its current name and with the earlier name of the All Star Analysts Survey, has been the subject of an academic research article titled Are the Wall Street Analyst Rankings Popularity Contests? The abstract reads: "We investigate the (sell-side) analyst rankings of Institutional Investor (I/I) and The Wall Street Journal (WSJ), using data from 1993–2005. We find that factors with a primary component of recognition are the most important determinants of the rankings, although performance measures are statistically significant determinants in some cases. The single exception to this finding is with existing WSJ stars, where industry-adjusted investment-recommendation performance is the only significant determinant of repeating as a star. Further, in the year after becoming stars, the recommendations of WSJ stars are significantly worse than those of nonstars; and the recommendations and earnings forecasts of I/I stars, as well as the earnings forecasts of WSJ stars, are not significantly different from those of nonstars. We conclude that these rankings are largely "popularity contests.""

The survey has also been mentioned in other studies of the variation between financial analysts in the accuracy of their forecasts.
