= Grinold and Kroner Model =

The Grinold and Kroner Model is used to calculate expected returns for a stock, stock index or the market as whole.

== Description ==
The model states that:

$\mathbb{E}[R] = \frac{\mathrm{Div}_1}{P_0} + i + g - \Delta S + \Delta (P/E)$

Where $\mathbb{E}[R]$ are the expected returns

- $\mathrm{Div}_1$ is the dividend in next period (period 1 assuming current t=0)
- $P_0$ is the current price (price at time 0)
- $i$ is the expected inflation rate
- $g$ is the real growth rate in earnings (note that by adding real growth and inflation, this is basically identical to just adding nominal growth)
- $\Delta S$ is the changes in shares outstanding (i.e. increases in shares outstanding decrease expected returns)
- $\Delta (P/E)$ is the changes in P/E ratio (positive relationship between changes in P/e and expected returns)

One offshoot of this discounted cash flow analysis is the disputed Fed model, which compares the earnings yield to the nominal 10-year Treasury bond yield.

Grinold, Kroner, and Siegel (2011) estimated the inputs to the Grinold and Kroner model and arrived at a then-current equity risk premium estimate between 3.5% and 4%. The equity risk premium is the difference between the expected total return on a capitalization-weighted stock market index and the yield on a riskless government bond (in this case one with 10 years to maturity).
