= Livingston Survey =

The Livingston Survey is a biannual survey (conducted in June and December of every year) about the economy of the United States conducted by the Federal Reserve Bank of Philadelphia. Begun in 1946, it is the longest continuous record of economists' expectations.

== History ==
Joseph Livingston, then the financial editor for The Philadelphia Record, created the survey in 1946. His detailed questionnaire asked approximately 50 economists around the United States to forecast various economic performance metrics for the next six months, year, and two years. Livingston administered the survey semiannually until his death in 1989, making it the longest continuous record of economists' expectations. In 1978, the Federal Reserve Bank of Philadelphia digitized Livingston's historical data and made it available to researchers. The bank continued administering the survey after his death.

A 1997 paper by Dean Croushure of the Federal Reserve Bank of Philadelphia described the history of the survey, argued for its usefulness in testing rational expectations hypotheses through the comparison of forecasts with reality, and explained how the Federal Reserve Bank of Philadelphia was taking over the survey.

== Variables and data sources ==
The forecasts made by the Livingston Survey of its variables are compared with actual values reported by the Bureau of Economic Analysis (in its Survey of Current Business), Federal Reserve Board, and Bureau of Labor Statistics.

Forecasts are made for the values of all variables six months from now and twelve months from now (i.e., coinciding in time with the next two administrations of the survey). The variables forecast are subdivided into variables reported quarterly, monthly, and daily. For variables reported quarterly, forecasts for the values two quarters from now and four quarters from now are recorded. For variables reported monthly, forecasts for the values six months from now and twelve months from now are recorded. Similarly, for variables reported daily, forecasts are recorded for the value on the last day of the month six months and twelve months from now.

In addition:

- The June survey includes forecasts for the annual average for the current year and for the next year.
- The December survey includes forecasts for the annual average for the current year and for the next two years.

Beginning with the survey of June 1990 (and excluding December 1990) two other long-range forecast questions were included in the survey:

- The 10-year annual-average rate of consumer price index inflation.
- The 10-year annual-average rate of growth in real GDP.

The main variables are as follows:

- The quarterly variables include various measures of gross domestic product (including real GDP and nominal GDP).
- The monthly variables include measures of the consumer price index, housing starts, industrial production, and unemployment.
- The daily variables include various interest rate measures and the S&P 500 index value.

== Reception ==
=== Academic research ===
There is extensive academic research citing the Livingston Survey, including some devoted to evaluating the accuracy and bias in the forecasts. For instance, a 1983 paper by Dietrich and Joines began with the observation: "For more than a decade, researchers have been using the Livingston survey data on inflationary expectations in empirical work."

The heyday of use for the Livingston Survey was the late 1970s and early 1980s, because it was the main survey of forecasts that had been around for a sufficiently long time at the time. Around 1990, research on forecast accuracy switched to using the Survey of Professional Forecasters and Blue Chip Economic Indicators, and more recent research has focused on the Consensus Forecasts.

=== Reception in the press and blogs ===
Livingston Survey forecasts have been cited by the financial press and blogs many times.
