= Economic forecasting =

Process of making predictions about the economy

Economic forecasting is the process of making predictions about the economy. Forecasts can be made at a high level of aggregation—for example, for GDP, inflation, unemployment, or the fiscal deficit. They can also be made at a more disaggregated level, targeting specific economic sectors or even individual firms. This practice is a fundamental part of economic analysis, providing a measure of a potential investment's future prospects and helping shape policy decisions. Many institutions engage in economic forecasting: national governments, banks and central banks, consultants and private sector entities such as think-tanks, and companies or international organizations such as the International Monetary Fund, World Bank and the OECD. A broad range of forecasts are collected and compiled by "Consensus Economics". Some forecasts are produced annually, but many are updated more frequently.

The economist typically considers risks (i.e., events or conditions that can cause the result to vary from their initial estimates). These risks help illustrate the reasoning process used in arriving at the final forecast numbers. Economists typically use commentary along with data visualization tools such as tables and charts to communicate their forecast. In preparing economic forecasts a variety of information has been used in an attempt to increase the accuracy.

Everything from macroeconomic, microeconomic, market data from the future, machine-learning (neural networks), and human behavioral studies have all been used to achieve better forecasts. Forecasts are used for a variety of purposes. Governments and businesses use economic forecasts to help them determine their strategy, multi-year plans, and budgets for the upcoming year. Stock market analysts use forecasts to help them estimate the valuation of a company and its stock.

Economists select which variables are important to the subject material under discussion. Economists may use statistical analysis of historical data to determine the apparent relationships between particular independent variables and their relationship to the dependent variable under study. For example, to what extent did changes in housing prices affect the net worth of the population overall in the past? This relationship can then be used to forecast the future. That is, if housing prices are expected to change in a particular way, what effect would that have on the future net worth of the population? Forecasts are generally based on sample data rather than a complete population, which introduces uncertainty. The economist conducts statistical tests and develops statistical models (often using regression analysis) to determine which relationships best describe or predict the behavior of the variables under study. Historical data and assumptions about the future are applied to the model in arriving at a forecast for particular variables.

== Sources of forecasts ==
=== Global scope ===
The Economic Outlook is the OECD's twice-yearly analysis of the major economic trends and prospects for the next two years. The IMF publishes the World Economic Outlook report twice annually, which provides comprehensive global coverage. The IMF and World Bank also produce Regional Economic Outlook for various parts of the world.

There are also private companies such as The Conference Board and Lombard Street Research that provide global economic forecasts.

=== U.S. forecasts ===
The U.S. Congressional Budget Office (CBO) publishes a report titled "The Budget and Economic Outlook" annually, which primarily covers the following ten-year period. The U.S. Federal Reserve Board of Governors members also give speeches, provide testimony, and issue reports throughout the year that cover the economic outlook. Regional Federal Reserve Banks, such as the St Louis Federal Reserve Bank also provide forecasts.

Large banks such as Wells Fargo and JP Morgan Chase provide economic reports and newsletters.

=== European forecasts ===
The European Commission also publishes comprehensive macroeconomic forecasts for its member countries on a quarterly basis - Spring, Summer, Autumn and Winter.

=== Combining Forecasts ===
Forecasts from multiple sources may be arithmetically combined and the result is often referred to as a consensus forecast. Private firms, central banks, and government agencies publish a large volume of forecast information to meet the strong demand for economic forecast data. Consensus Economics compiles the macroeconomic forecasts prepared by a variety of forecasters, and publishes them on a weekly and monthly basis. The Economist magazine regularly provides such a snapshot as well, for a narrower range of countries and variables.

Econometric studies have demonstrated that the use of past errors of each original forecast to determine the weights assigned to each forecast in the creation of a combined forecast results in a composite set of forecasts that generally yields lower mean-square errors compared to either of the individual original forecasts. However, it has been found that the entry and exit of forecasters can have a substantial impact on the real-time effectiveness of conventional combination methods. The dynamic nature of the forecasting combination and adjusting weighting techniques is not neutral.

== Forecast methods ==
The process of economic forecasting is similar to data analysis and results in estimated values for key economic variables in the future. An economist applies the techniques of econometrics in their forecasting process. Typical steps may include:

1. Scope: Key economic variables and topics for forecast commentary are determined based on the needs of the forecast audience.
2. Literature review: Commentary from sources with summary-level perspective, such as the IMF, OECD, U.S. Federal Reserve, and CBO helps with identifying key economic trends, issues and risks. Such commentary can also help the forecaster with their own assumptions while also giving them other forecasts to compare against.
3. Obtain data inputs: Historical data is gathered on key economic variables. This data is contained in print as well as electronic sources such as the FRED database or Eurostat, which allow users to query historical values for variables of interest.
4. Determine historical relationships: Historical data is used to determine the relationships between one or more independent variables and the dependent variable under study, often by using regression analysis.
5. Model: Historical data inputs and assumptions are used to develop an econometric model. Models typically apply a computation to a series of inputs to generate an economic forecast for one or more variables.
6. Report: The outputs of the model are included in reports that typically include information graphics and commentary to help the reader understand the forecast.

Forecasters may use computational general equilibrium models or dynamic stochastic general equilibrium models. The latter are often used by central banks.

Methods of forecasting include Econometric models, Consensus forecasts, Economic base analysis, Shift-share analysis, Input-output model and the Grinold and Kroner Model. See also Land use forecasting, Reference class forecasting, Transportation planning and Calculating Demand Forecast Accuracy.

The World Bank provides a means for individuals and organizations to run their own simulations and forecasts using its iSimulate platform.

== Issues in forecasting ==
=== Forecast accuracy ===
There are many studies on the subject of forecast accuracy. Accuracy is one of the main, if not the main, criteria used to judge forecast quality. Some of the references below relate to academic studies of forecast accuracy. Forecasting performance appears to be time-dependent, where some exogenous events affect forecast quality. As expert forecasts are generally better than market-based forecasts, forecast performance depends on several factors: model, political economy (terrorism), financial stability etc.

In early 2014 the OECD carried out a self-analysis of its projections. "The OECD also found that it was too optimistic for countries that were most open to trade and foreign finance, that had the most tightly regulated markets and weak banking systems" according to the Financial Times.

In 2012, Consensus Economics launched its Forecast Accuracy Award, and each year publishes a list of winners who have most accurately predicted the final outcome of GDP and CPI for the prior year for over 40 countries. "Consensus Economics Forecast Accuracy Award"

In recent years, research has demonstrated that behavioral biases play a significant role in affecting the accuracy of forecasts. The education and working experience of forecasters influence the accuracy and boldness of their predictions. Forecasting accuracy is also impacted by the forecaster's experience with high inflation rates. Additionally, political events such as terrorism have been shown to influence the accuracy of both expert- and market-based forecasts of inflation and exchange rates. This highlights the range of external factors and biases that should be considered when evaluating the accuracy of forecasts and making informed decisions.

=== Forecasts and the Great Recession ===
The financial and economic crisis that erupted in 2007—arguably the worst since the Great Depression of the 1930s—was not foreseen by most forecasters, though many analysts had been predicting it for some time (for example, Stephen Roach, Meredith Whitney, Gary Shilling, Peter Schiff, Marc Faber, Nouriel Roubini, Brooksley Born, and Robert Shiller). The failure of the majority of them to forecast the "Great Recession" caused soul searching in the profession. The UK's Queen Elizabeth herself asked why had “nobody” noticed that the credit crunch was on its way, and a group of economists—experts from business, the City, its regulators, academia, and government—tried to explain in a letter.

It was not just forecasting the Great Recession, but also forecasting its impact, where it was clear that economists struggled.

For example, in Singapore Citi argued the country would experience "the most severe recession in Singapore’s history". The economy grew in 2009 by 3.1% and in 2010, the nation saw a 15.2% growth rate. Similarly, Nouriel Roubini predicted in January 2009 that oil prices would stay below $40 for all of 2009. By the end of 2009, however, oil prices were at $80. In March 2009, he predicted the S&P 500 would fall below 600 that year, and possibly plummet to 200. It closed at over 1,115, up 24%, the largest single year gain since 2003. In 2009, he also predicted that the US government would take over and nationalize a number of large banks; it did not happen. In October 2009, he predicted that gold "can go above $1,000, but it can’t move up 20-30%”; he was wrong, as the price of gold rose over the next 18 months, breaking through the $1,000 barrier to over $1,400. Although in May 2010 he predicted a 20% decline in the stock market, the S&P actually rose about 20% over the course of the next year (even excluding returns from dividends).

== List of regularly published surveys based on polling economists on their forecasts ==
Organization name	Forecast name	Number of individuals surveyed	Number of countries covered	List of countries/regions covered	Frequency	How far ahead are the forecasts made for	Start date
Blue Chip Publications division of Aspen Publishers	Blue Chip Economic Indicators	50+	1	United States	Monthly	?	1976
Consensus Economics	Consensus Forecasts	over 1000	115	Member countries of the G-7 industrialized nations, the Eurozone region as well as various economies in Western Europe, the Middle East, Central Asia, Africa, Asia Pacific, Eastern Europe, Latin America and the Nordic countries.	Daily, Weekly and monthly	1 month to 10 years	1989
Federal Reserve Bank of Philadelphia	Livingston Survey	?	1	United States	Bi-annually (June and December every year)	Two bi-annual periods (6 months and 12 months from now), plus some forecasts for two years	1946
European Central Bank	ECB Survey of Professional Forecasters	55	?	Euro zone	Quarterly	Two quarters and six quarters from now, plus the current and next two years	1999
RFE	Resources for Economists	?	?	Global Economic Outlook	Quarterly	Two quarters and six quarters from now, plus the current and next two years	1949

== See also ==
- Aladdin (BlackRock)
- Economic Cycle Research Institute
- Efficient contract theory
- Social return on investment
- Financial forecast
- Customer demand planning
