= Economic Insights =

- Discipline: Economics
- Language: English

Publication details
- Former name: Business Review
- History: 1975–present
- Publisher: Federal Reserve Bank of Philadelphia (United States)
- Frequency: Quarterly
- Open access: Yes

Standard abbreviations
- ISO 4: Econ. Insights

Indexing
- Economics Insights
- ISSN: 2574-0946 (print); 2574-0989 (web)
- Business Review
- ISSN: 0007-7011

Links
- Journal homepage

Economic Insights (formerly Business Review) is a quarterly publication of the Federal Reserve Bank of Philadelphia comprising articles written by in-house staff economists aimed at readers with a general interest in economic issues. Topics covered include economic policy, banking, and financial and regional economics.

== History ==
Business Review has been published on a quarterly basis since 1925, and online archives from 1975 onward are available on the Federal Reserve Bank of Philadelphia.
