= Roy Batchelor =

British economist

Roy A. Batchelor (born 23 March 1947) is Professor Emeritus in Political Economy and Statistics in Bayes Business School (formerly Cass), City St George's, University of London.

Educated at Allan Glen's School and Glasgow University, Roy worked as a government scientist and economist; then at the UK National Institute of Economic and Social Research. He joined City University in 1977, and has since been active in research, teaching and academic administration, this including spells as Head of Banking and Finance Department, Director of the Cass Executive MBA programme in Dubai, and of the Bayes Executive MBA in London.

Professor Batchelor’s research has focussed on economic and financial market forecasting, and the interpretation and use of consumer and business survey data. He has published widely in these fields, often in the International Journal of Forecasting, and its practitioner sister Foresight (forecasting journal). In 2008 Professor Batchelor was elected Honorary Fellow of the International Institute of Forecasters, and has since served as an elected Director of the IIF. Professor Batchelor has also been active in professional training and consultancy with business and governmental organisations around the world. He has held many visiting academic appointments, and is a Fellow and Research Professor at the ifo Institute for Economic Research in Munich.
