= Blue Chip Economic Indicators =

Blue Chip Economic Indicators is a monthly survey and associated publication by Wolters Kluwer collecting macroeconomic forecasts related to the economy of the United States. The survey polls America's top business economists, collecting their forecasts of U.S. economic growth, inflation, interest rates, and a host of other critical indicators of future business activity. It has a sister publication called Blue Chip Financial Forecasts, which surveys forecasts of the future direction and level of U.S. interest rates.

== History ==
Blue Chip Economic Indicators and Blue Chip Financial Forecasts started in 1976.

== Variables reported ==
The Blue Chip Economic Indicators survey provides forecasts for this year and next from each panel member, plus and average, or consensus, of their forecasts for each of these variables associated with the economy of the United States:

- Real GDP
- GDP price index
- Nominal GDP
- Consumer price index
- Industrial production
- Real disposable personal income
- Real personal consumption expenditures
- Real non-residential fixed investment
- Pre-tax corporate profits
- 3-month Treasury bill rate
- 10-year Treasury note yield
- Unemployment rate
- Total housing starts
- Auto and light truck sales
- Real Net exports

== Reception ==
=== Academic reception ===
Many papers in the academic literature on the accuracy of macroeconomic forecasts have used the Blue Chip Economic Indicators for a data set of forecasts whose accuracy is to be evaluated. A paper by Laster, Bennett, and Geoum (1999) made a theoretical argument for how rational forecasters with identical information and incentives may still come up with divergent forecasts to maximize their probability of winning, and used the Blue chip Economic Indicators data to provide evidence supportive of their model. The paper noted: "The publisher of Blue Chip Economic Indicators, a monthly newsletter compiling dozens of professional economic forecasts, holds an annual dinner at which the most accurate forecaster for the previous year is honored. The winning forecaster is also identified in later issues of the newsletter."

The Congressional Budget Office has also cited Blue Chip Economic Indicators data in some of its publications. The Federal Reserve Bank of Atlanta has also cited Blue Chip Economic Indicators in comparison to its unofficial running estimate of real GDP growth (GDPnow).

=== Reception in the financial press and blogs ===
The results of the Blue Chip Economic Indicators have also been used to inform discussion in the financial press and blogs, including Forbes and Barron's.

In March 2009, PolitiFact reported that a controversial statement made by Christina Romer based on Blue Chip Economic Indicators data had correctly cited the Blue Chip Economic Indicators.

== See also ==
- Economic forecasting
- Greenbook
- Western Blue Chip Economic Forecast
- Survey of Professional Forecasters
- ECB Survey of Professional Forecasters
- Consensus Economics: Surveys of International Economic Forecasts
- Livingston Survey
