= Western Blue Chip Economic Forecast =

The Western Blue Chip Economic Forecast is a consensus forecast prepared by the W. P. Carey School of Business at Arizona State University for the economies of the states in the Western United States.

== History ==
The forecasts have been published monthly starting January 2001, and the full archive of past forecasts is available for free from the website.

In March 2005, the Business Forecasting Center at the University of the Pacific joined the panel for the Western Blue Chip Economic Forecast.

== Details ==
=== States ===
The Western Blue Chip Economic Forecast includes forecasts on the following states in the Western United States: Arizona, California, Colorado, Idaho, Montana, Nevada, New Mexico, Oregon, Texas, Utah, Washington, and Wyoming.

=== Variables ===
The forecasts are published monthly and include estimates for the year-on-year percentage changes in the following variables for each state:

- Personal income in current dollars
- Wages and salary employment
- Population (i.e., it measures population growth)
- Single-family housing permits

The forecasts are made both for the change from the previous calendar year to the current calendar year and from the current calendar year to the next calendar year.

=== Forecast sources ===
For each state, one can access, in addition to the consensus forecasts, forecasts from each of the sources that are on the panel. The forecast sources vary by state, though some forecast sources are common across states. For instance, for the state of Arizona, the forecast sources include the Arizona Department of Administration, Arizona Public Service, Wells Fargo, and many others. For the state of California, forecast sources include the California Department of Finance, Chapman University, the UCLA Business Forecasting Center, Wells Fargo, University of the Pacific, Woodbury University, and others.

== Reception ==
=== Academic reception ===
There has been some academic research into the accuracy of the Western Blue Chip Economic Forecast. A 2003 paper by Carol T. West (published just two years after the forecast became operational) pointed to the data set from the Western Blue Chip Economic Forecast as a valuable information source for future studies of the accuracy of regional forecasts. A 2009 paper by Phillips and Lopez used the Western Blue Chip Economic Forecast data to compare the accuracy of different forecasters and models, and found that some forecasters consistently outperformed others. Moreover, based on an informal survey of the most accurate forecasters, it found that they were likely to use formal statistical models rather than pure judgment. The Dallas Fed's model used to forecast growth in Texas was found to be one of the more accurate forecasting models.

=== Reception in financial press and blogs ===
The Western Blue Chip Economic Forecast has been cited in Forbes as one of the few sources of regional forecasts for the economy of the United States. It has also been cited in a number of regional business journals in discussions of regional economic prospects.
