= Consensus Economics =

Global macroeconomic survey firm

- Founded: 1989
- Headquarters: London, United Kingdom

Consensus Economics is a global macroeconomic survey firm that polls more than 1000 economists monthly for their forecasts for over 2000 macroeconomic indicators in 115 countries. The company is headquartered in London, United Kingdom.

== History ==
Consensus Economics undertook its first survey in October 1989 and now releases monthly, weekly and daily survey results.

== Forecasts ==
Consensus Economics publishes Consensus Forecasts, a widely cited monthly compilation of macroeconomic forecasts and topical analyses by country for 115 economies. The countries covered include member countries of the G-7 industrialized nations, Asia Pacific, Eastern Europe, and Latin America. It also has more specialized publications such as the Foreign Exchange forecasts and Energy, Metals and Agriculture Consensus Forecasts. Each publication is distributed in hard-copy format and via email as PDF files and Excel spreadsheets as well as major platforms and its own API. Once a year the company releases The Consensus Forecasts Global Outlook at the start of November, which covers long-term forecasts, including 2050 forecasts, for countries in Western and Eastern Europe, North and South America and the Asia Pacific.

In addition to the forecasts made available to subscribers, Consensus Economics offers more up to date and detailed forecast data to institutional investors, to corporate planning executives and to governments and international institutions. The history of the forecasts is also licensed for research purposes.

== Reports ==
Consensus Economics' catalogue of publications covers 115 countries, which appear in the following regions: the G-7 nations, the Euro zone, Western Europe, Middle East, Central Asia, Africa, the Nordic countries, Asia Pacific, Latin America and Eastern Europe. A list of countries that make up the monthly compilations of country economic forecasts can be found below for the following publications:

=== Consensus Forecasts ===
United States, Japan, Germany, France, United Kingdom, Italy, Canada, Euro Zone, Netherlands, Norway, Spain, Sweden, Switzerland, Austria, Belgium, Denmark, Egypt, Finland, Greece, Ireland, Israel, Nigeria, Portugal, Saudi Arabia and South Africa.

Consensus Forecasts
- Frequency: Monthly
- Language: English
- Website: www.consensuseconomics.com
- ISSN: 0957-0950

=== Asia Pacific Consensus Forecasts ===
Australia, China, Hong Kong, India, Indonesia, Japan, Malaysia, New Zealand, Philippines, Singapore, South Korea, Taiwan, Thailand, Vietnam, Bangladesh, Myanmar, Pakistan and Sri Lanka.

Asia Pacific Consensus Forecasts
- Frequency: Monthly
- Language: English
- Website: www.consensuseconomics.com
- ISSN: 1351-0967

=== Latin America Consensus Forecasts ===
Argentina, Brazil, Chile, Mexico, Venezuela, Colombia, Peru, Bolivia, Costa Rica, Dominican Republic, Ecuador, El Salvador, Guatemala, Honduras, Nicaragua, Panama, Paraguay and Uruguay.

Latin American Consensus Forecasts
- Frequency: Monthly
- Language: English
- Website: www.consensuseconomics.com
- ISSN: 0968-4972

=== Eastern Europe Consensus Forecasts ===
Czech Republic, Hungary, Poland, Russia, Turkey, Bulgaria, Croatia, Estonia, Latvia, Lithuania, Romania, Slovakia, Slovenia, Ukraine, Albania, Armenia, Azerbaijan, Belarus, Bosnia & Herzegovina, Cyprus, Georgia, Kazakhstan, North Macedonia, Moldova, Serbia, Turkmenistan and Uzbekistan.

Eastern Europe Consensus Forecasts
- Frequency: Monthly
- Language: English
- Website: www.consensuseconomics.com
- ISSN: 1462-4001

=== Consensus Forecasts – USA ===
Detailed coverage of the US economy, showing forecasts for 20 macroeconomic variables.

In addition, monthly forecast data is also available for currency exchange rates as well as a range of commodity prices. These appear in Foreign Exchange Consensus Forecasts and Energy and Metals Consensus Forecasts.

=== Foreign Exchange Consensus Forecasts ===
The publication provides coverage for over 90 currencies, which includes the following: US dollar, Euro, Japanese yen, Argentinian peso, Australian dollar, Brazilian real, Canadian dollar, Chilean peso, Colombian peso, Czech Koruna, Danish krone, Hong Kong dollar, Hungarian forint, Indian rupee, Indonesian rupiah, Israeli shekel, Malaysian ringgit, Mexican peso, New Zealand dollar, Norwegian krone, Peruvian sol, Philippine peso, Polish zloty, Romanian leu, Russian rouble, Singaporean dollar, South African rand, South Korean won, Swedish krona, Swiss franc, Taiwanese dollar, Thai baht, Turkish lira, Ukrainian hryvnia, Venezuelan bolivar, Albanian lek, Algerian dinar, Angolan kwanza, Azerbaijani manat, Bahrain dinar, Bangladesh taka, Belarusian rouble, Bolivian boliviano, Bosnia Herz. Marka, Botswana pula, Bulgarian lev, Costa Rica colon, Croatian kuna, Dominican Republic peso, Ecuadorian sucre, Egyptian pound, El Salvador colon, Georgian lari, Ghanaian cedi, Guatemalan quetzal, Guyanese dollar, Haitian gourde, Honduran lempira, Icelandic krona, Iranian rial, Iraqi dinar, Ivory Coast CFA franc, Jamaican dollar, Jordanian dinar, Kazakhstani tenge, Kenyan shilling, Kuwaiti dinar, Laos kip, Lebanese pound, Libyan dinar, Macedonian denar, Malawian kwacha, Moroccan dirham, Mozambican metical, Myanmar kyat, Nicaraguan cordoba, Nigerian naira, Oman rial, Pakistani rupee, Paraguayan guarani, Renminbi, Saudi Arabian riyal, Serbian dinar, Sri Lankan rupee, Sterling, Sudanese pound, Tanzanian shilling, Tunisian dinar, UAE dirham, Ugandan shilling, Uruguayan peso, Uzbekistani som, Vietnamese dong and Zambian kwacha.

=== Energy, Metals and Agriculture Consensus Forecasts ===
Coverage of 40 commodities, which includes crude oil (Brent crude as well as West Texas Intermediate crude), US gasoline & heating oil, European gas oil, natural gas (UK and US Henry Hub, Asia and EU), coal (Australian coking coal, Australian Steaming coal spot and contract price), uranium, carbon, aluminium, alumina & aluminium alloy, copper, nickel, lead, zinc, steel (US hot rolled coil as well as Asia and Europe hot rolled coil), iron ore (North China fines, Australian fines, Australian lump as well as Brazilian fines), tin, cobalt, lithium carbonate, lithium hydroxide, lithium spodumene, manganese, molybdenum, rutile, ilmenite, zircon, gold, silver, platinum and palladium. Agricultural commodities include wheat, corn, soybeans, sugar, cotton, cocoa and palm oil. Consensus Economics first started collecting commodity forecasts in 1995.

=== Current Economics ===
Besides the publication of monthly reports of country economic forecasts, Consensus Economics also produces a monthly journal which includes articles from some of the world's leading international firms.

A complete list of Consensus Economics' reports can be found on their website.

== Reception ==
=== Academic research ===
A 2001 paper by Roy Batchelor of City University Business School, London compared the Consensus Forecasts with forecasts made by the International Monetary Fund (IMF) and Organisation for Economic Co-operation and Development (OECD). The study found: "With few exceptions, the private sector forecasts are less biased and more accurate in terms of mean absolute error and root mean square error. Formal tests show these differences are statistically significant for forecasts of real growth and production, less so for forecasts of inflation and unemployment. Overall, there appears little information in the OECD and IMF forecasts that could be used to reduce significantly the error in the private sector forecasts."

The accuracy and bias in the combined forecasts has been a topic of academic research. A 2009 paper by Ager, Kappler and Osterloh found: "The test for common bias reveals that several countries show biased forecasts, especially with forecasts covering more than 12 months. These results partially confirm the presumption that the macroeconomic forecasts for the past 10 years were severely affected by the pronounced shocks in that period. The fact that for individual countries systematic biases can be observed by applying the Consensus Forecasts reveals that in these countries the forecasting industry on the whole was not able to cope with the shocks specific to the past ten years. Revisions of past months for GDP growth forecasts have significant explanatory power for current revisions for almost all countries. For inflation revisions we find significant past revisions for some countries. Overall, our results imply that a lack of information efficiency is more severe for GDP forecasts than for inflation forecasts."

A 2011 paper by Filip Novotny and Marie Rakova for the Czech National Bank compared the accuracy of the Consensus Forecasts estimates with those of the International Monetary Fund and the Organisation for Economic Co-operation and Development. Echoing the result of Ager, Kappler, and Osterloh, it found: "In the period from 1994 to 2009 Consensus forecasts for effective euro-area consumer price inflation and GDP growth beat the alternatives by a difference which is typically statistically significant. The results are more diverse for the pre-crisis sample (1994–2007). The Consensus forecast for euro-area producer price inflation significantly outperforms the naïve forecast in the short-term. Finally, the Consensus forecast for the USD/EUR exchange rate during the period from 2002 to 2009 is more precise than the naïve forecast and the forecast implied by the forward rate."

A 2007 paper by Batchelor used Consensus Forecasts data to consider various theories of bias in macroeconomic forecasts, and concluded: "In all countries there is evidence that individual forecasters converge on the consensus forecast too slowly. However, the persistent optimism of some forecasters, and the persistent pessimism of others, is not consistent with the predictions of models of "rational bias" that have become popular in the finance and economics literature."

Consensus Forecasts data has been cited by other academic literature, such as discussion of the Asian financial crisis.

== See also ==
- Economic forecasting
- Organisation for Economic Co-operation and Development, that publishes its own macroeconomic forecasts
- International Monetary Fund, that publishes its own global macroeconomic forecasts
- Blue Chip Economic Indicators, that publishes macroeconomic forecasts for the economy of the United States
- Survey of Professional Forecasters, that publishes macroeconomic forecasts for the economy of the United States
- ECB Survey of Professional Forecasters, that publishes macroeconomic forecasts for the Eurozone
