= Survey of Professional Forecasters =

The Survey of Professional Forecasters (SPF) is a quarterly survey of macroeconomic forecasts for the economy of the United States issued by the Federal Reserve Bank of Philadelphia. It is the oldest such survey in the United States.

The survey includes an "anxious index" that estimates the probability of a decline in real GDP.

== History ==
The survey began in 1968 and was conducted by the American Statistical Association (ASA) and the National Bureau of Economic Research (NBER). The Federal Reserve Bank of Philadelphia took over the survey in 1990. In its early days (prior to the takeover by the Federal Reserve Bank of Philadelphia) the survey was often referred to in the academic literature as the ASA-NBER survey.

In May 2008, it was announced that SPF would be adding an industry classification variable for its survey respondents, so that researchers could more easily determine how people's forecasts related to the industry they were from.

== Variables ==
The Survey of Professional Forecasters includes variables in the following broad categories:

- U.S. business indicators
- Real GDP and its components
- CPI and PCE inflation
- Long-term inflation forecasts
- Additional long-term forecasts
- Equilibrium unemployment
- Probability on ranges (for GDP, inflation, and unemployment measures)
- Anxious Index
- Implied forecasts

== Reception ==
SPF has been used in academic research on forecast accuracy and forecast bias.

A 1997 analysis of density forecasts of inflation made in the SPF finds: "The probability of a large negative inflation shock is generally overestimated, and in more recent years the probability of a large shock of either sign is overestimated. Inflation surprises are serially correlated, although agents eventually adapt. Expectations of low inflation are associated with reduced uncertainty. The results suggest several promising directions for future research."

== Bias and Errors ==
SPF keeps a record of the bias and error in its own past forecasts online. Their forecasting track record and the implications of their forecasts have been discussed on business press and blogs, including Forbes and the Wall Street Journal.

Studies have shown that professional survey forecasts can be biased, such as displaying pessimism or overconfidence. Additionally, heterogeneity in the survey forecasts at the individual level can be linked to the experience and education of the surveyed professionals.

== See also ==
- Economic forecasting
- Greenbook: The Federal Reserve Bank of Philadelphia makes available the Greenbook projections data set in Microsoft Excel format. This includes only four quarterly Greenbook projections in order to maximize the correspondence and comparability with the Survey of Professional Forecasters.
- ECB Survey of Professional Forecasters, a similar survey conducted by the European Central Bank starting 1999.
- Blue Chip Economic Indicators
- Western Blue Chip Economic Forecast
- Consensus Economics: Surveys of US and International Economic Forecasts
- Livingston Survey
