= Federal Reserve Bank of Philadelphia =

Member Bank of Federal Reserve

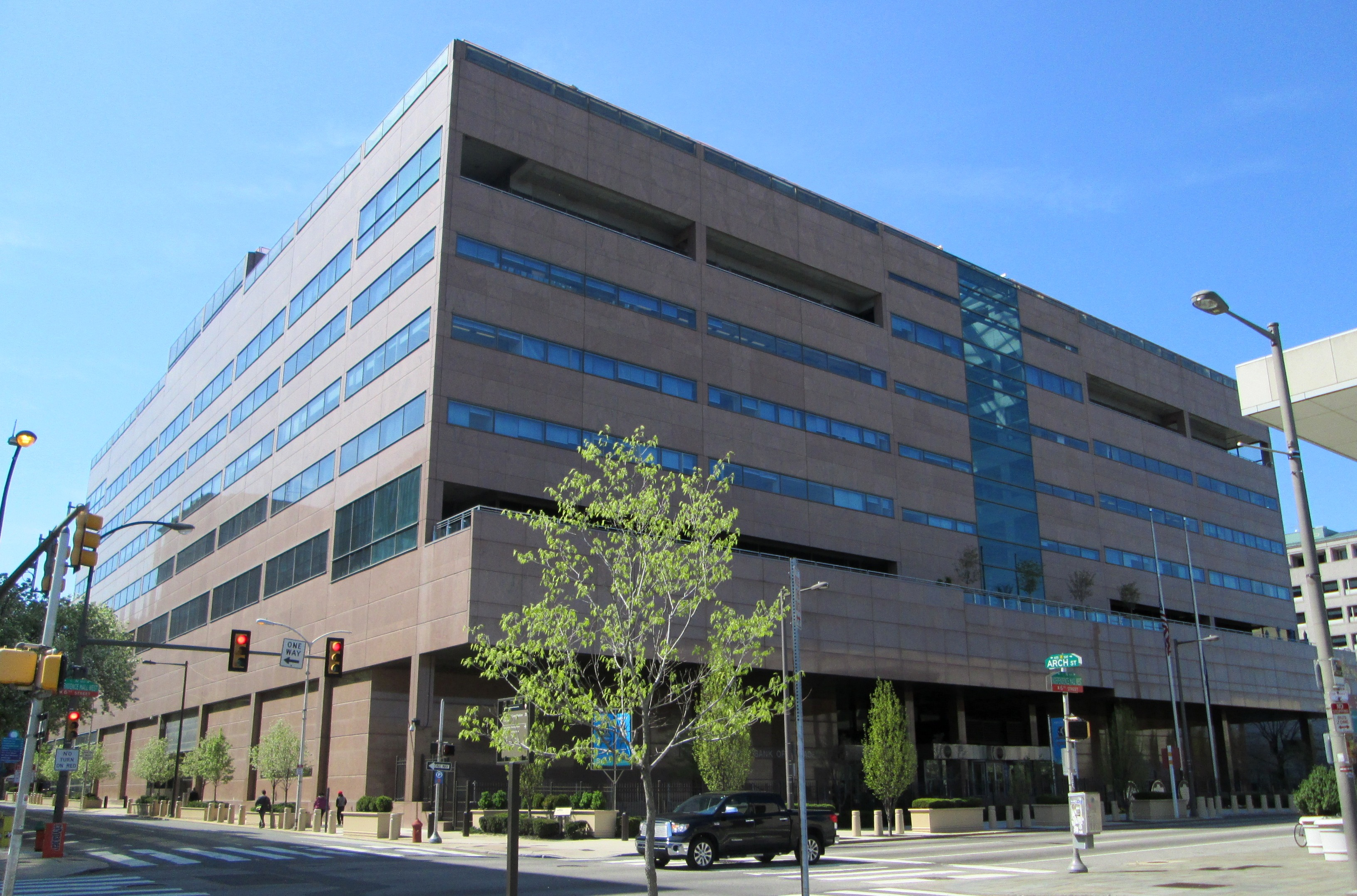
- The Federal Reserve Bank of Philadelphia in 2013
- Central bank of: Third District: Delaware Parts of: New Jersey; Pennsylvania
- Headquarters: 10 Independence Mall; Philadelphia, Pennsylvania, U.S.
- Established: May 18, 1914 (112 years ago)
- President: Anna Louise Paulson
- Website: philadelphiafed.org
- The Federal Reserve Bank of Philadelphia is one of 12 regional banks that make up the Federal Reserve System

The Federal Reserve Bank of Philadelphia, also known as the Philadelphia Fed or the Philly Fed, is one of the twelve Federal Reserve Banks of the United States. It is responsible for the Third District of the Federal Reserve System, which encompasses eastern and central Pennsylvania, the nine southern counties of the states New Jersey, and Delaware. The district is headquartered in Philadelphia. Its geographical territory is by far the smallest in the system, and its population base is the second-smallest (next to the Federal Reserve Bank of Minneapolis). The current president of the Philadelphia Fed is Anna Louise Paulson.

The Philadelphia Fed conducts research on both the national and regional economy. Its regional manufacturing index is the second of the regional manufacturing reports released every month (the New York Fed's Empire State Index is now released earlier), but it is still very important to the financial community as a proxy for nationwide manufacturing conditions. The Federal Reserve Bank of Philadelphia publishes a quarterly survey of professional economic forecasters, the Survey of Professional Forecasters, also called "The Anxious Index". It is a highly predictive report on the prospects for the Economy of the United States. It also publishes a quarterly publication entitled Business Review. The bank took responsibility for the Livingston Survey in 1990; its website provides the survey's releases, documentation, mean and median forecasts, and individual responses.

== Board of directors ==
The following people serve on the board of directors as of July 2023. Terms expire on December 31 of their final year on the board.

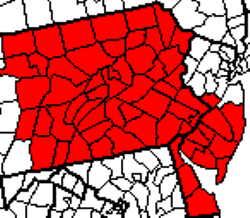
Map of the Third District

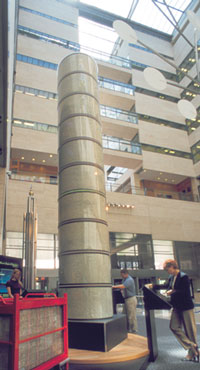
Lobby of the Federal Reserve Bank of Philadelphia. The lobby features a 25-foot (7.6 m) tower filled with shredded U.S. currency

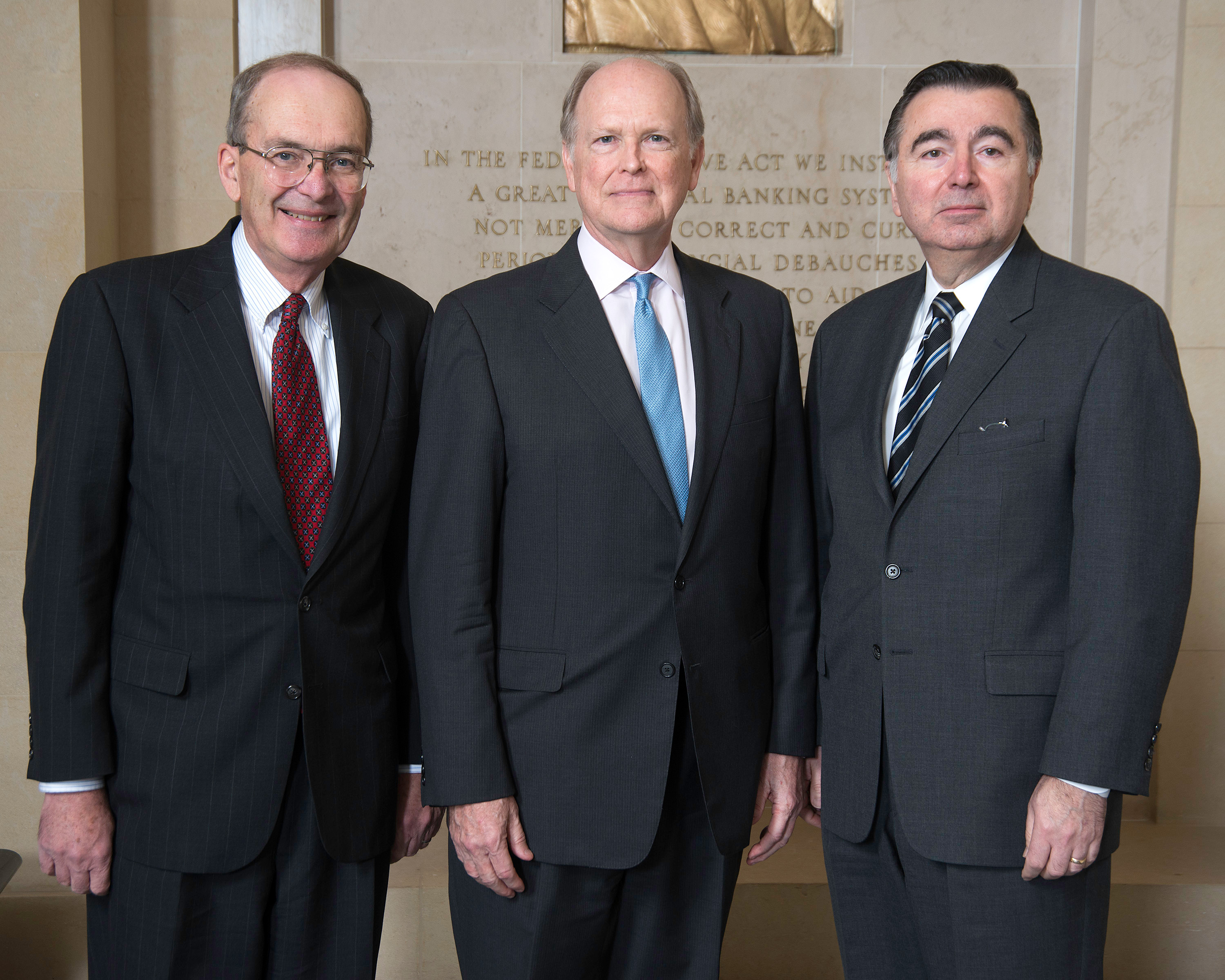
Former Presidents of the Philadelphia Fed (left to right) Edward Boehne (1981–2000), Charles Plosser (2006–2015), and Anthony Santomero (2000–2006)

=== Class A ===
Class A
Name	Title	Term Expires
Randall E. Black	President and chief executive officer Citizens Financial Services Inc. and First Citizens Community Bank; Mansfield, Pennsylvania	2023
Timothy P. Snyder	President and chief executive officer Fleetwood Bank; Fleetwood, Pennsylvania	2024
Christopher D. Maher	Chairman and chief executive officer OceansBank First, N.A. Toms River, New Jersey	2025

=== Class B ===
Class B
Name	Title	Term Expires
Bret S. Perkins	Senior vice president, external and government affairs Comcast Corporation; Philadelphia, Pennsylvania	2023
Julia H. Klein	Chairwoman and chief operating officer C.H. Briggs Company; Reading, Pennsylvania	2024
John Fry	President; Drexel University; Philadelphia, Pennsylvania	2025

=== Class C ===
Class C
Name	Title	Term Expires
William Lo	President; Crystal Steel Fabricators, Inc. Delmar, Delaware	2023
Sharmain Matlock-Turner (Deputy Chair)	President and chief executive officer Urban Affairs Coalition; Philadelphia, Pennsylvania	2024
Anthony Ibargüen (Chair)	Chief executive officer Quench USA, Inc. King of Prussia, Pennsylvania	2025

== See also ==
- Federal Reserve System
- Federal Reserve Districts
- Federal Reserve Branches
- Federal Reserve Act
- Old Federal Reserve Bank Building (Philadelphia)
- Structure of the Federal Reserve System
