= ECB Survey of Professional Forecasters =

Quarterly survey by the European Central Bank

The ECB Survey of Professional Forecasters, simply called the Survey of Professional Forecasters (SPF), is a quarterly survey of macroeconomic forecasts for the euro area issued by the European Central Bank (ECB).

== History ==
The ECB Survey of Professional Forecasters was started in 1999.

In 2007, the ECB published a review of the survey based on eight years of experience.

== Reception ==
=== Academic research ===
The ECB Survey of Professional Forecasters has been the subject of some academic research, including a 2013 paper considering whether there was a better way of combining the forecasts than simply taking the average. They found some methods of combining that did better than the average, but noted that it was not clear that these methods would continue to beat the average in the future.

== See also ==
- Survey of Professional Forecasters, a similar survey in the United States conducted by the Federal Reserve Bank of Philadelphia.
- Blue Chip Economic Indicators
