= Checkwriter =

Person, machine, or software that writes checks

A checkwriter may refer to:

== Occupation ==
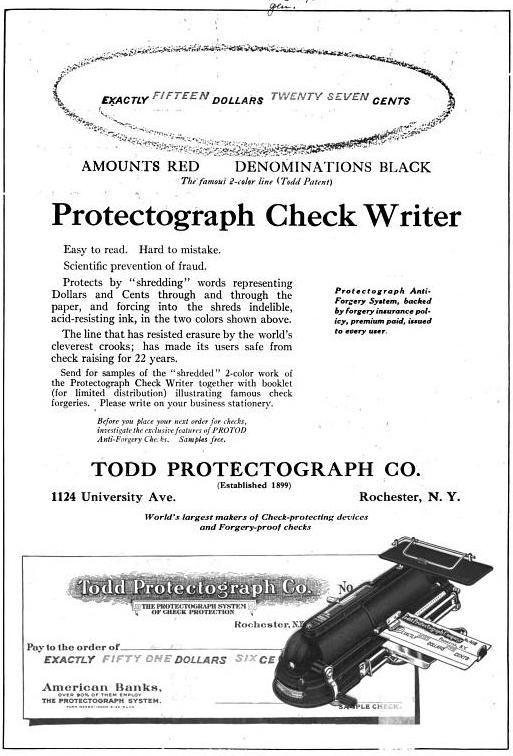
Protectograph Check Writer Ad (1922)

A person who physically writes a check or cheque. The check writer is also known as the "payor", "signer", "maker", the drawer, or the "account holder". The signer or presenter of the check, or person who prints and authorizes the check.

== Machine ==
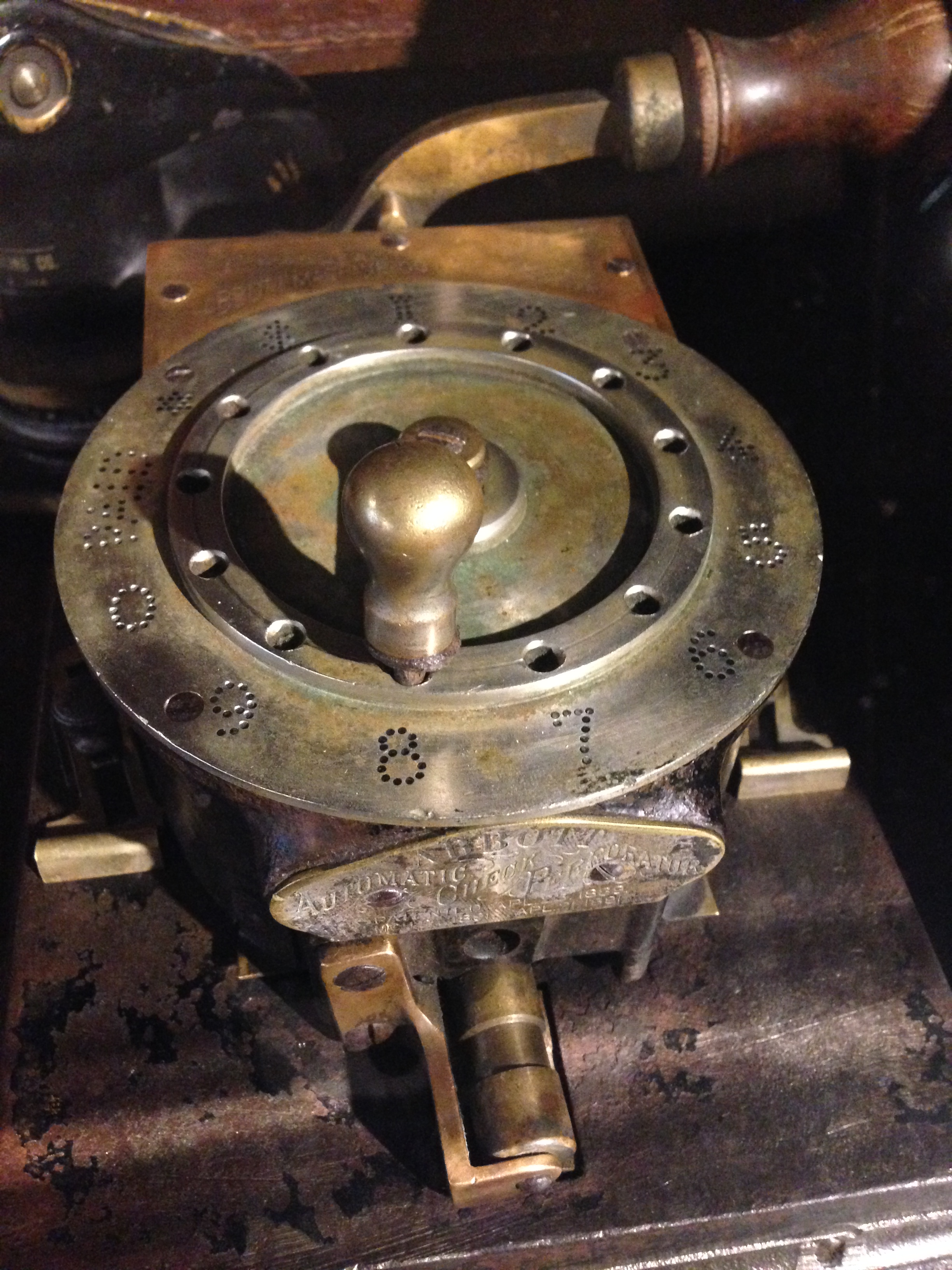
A check perforator with a notice of 1889 and 1891 patent dates

A check writer (also known as a "ribbon writer", "check signer", "check protector" or "check embosser"), is a physical device for protecting a check from unauthorized alteration of either the amount or the authorizing signature.

Devices of this type that use various technologies are also known as check protectors, check punches, and check perforators. A check punch punches holes in the shapes of numerals. A check perforator punches small round holes that form numerals.

A check writer, or ribbon writer, leaves a numerical or written value impression in the payment amount field of a check that is very difficult to alter. This is accomplished by the machine applying downward force on the check and leaving very small inked shreds in the paper.

The first check protector was introduced in 1870. The best known check protectors in the early 1900s had the brand name Protectograph (the Todd Company, Rochester, New York). Other well known manufacturers in the industry were F & E Hedman and the Paymaster Company (both out of Chicago, Illinois).

The person preparing a check positions the check in the check writer so its print-heads are centered over the field on the check where the amount of the check would otherwise be written out in words. Using a series of levers or buttons on the checkwriter's control panel, the operator enters the monetary amount of the check. This amount is then printed onto the check by the operator pulling a lever on the side of the unit (or by pressing a button on electric units). This brings the print-heads down upon a wide inked (usually multicolor) ribbon through which they print the selected amount on the check, with a prefix and suffix to prevent a fraudster from adding extra digits. Entering $6,762.64, for example, will produce text reading "TheSum6762dol's64cts".

There is a series of (usually) horizontal indentations on a pressure bar brought up underneath the check during this process, which matches similar indentations on the print-heads. This embosses the numeric amount through the paper of the check form, strongly discouraging any attempt to alter or raise this amount.

Because physical check writers and ribbon writers are now considered antique, businesses that still need this check protection technology such as a business, or organization which regularly prepares remittances by issuing high-amount checks can use a physical check writing device. Financial institutions regularly use them to prepare cashier's checks, and they are also used by issuers of money orders such as the United States Postal Service. Newer versions are electronic, but many are still made by Paymaster.

== Software ==
There are many check writing and printing software available.

Simple Checks is an online platform for check writing and printing. The service allows users to send checks via email and provides check fulfillment services, including printing and mailing checks on behalf of clients.

Online Check Writer is a cloud-based check printing software. This online application facilitates Check printing of any bank, on any blank Check paper using any printer. The company claims they are integrated with QuickBooks and 16000+ Banks and Financial Institutions.

CheckWriter is business software used to accept payments from customers, patients, members or subscribers. Unlike a physical device, the software facilitates check draft demand draft technology, and Check 21 Act regulations to emulate the check writer.

The software prints a physical draft of a customer's checks that a business can then deposit into any U.S. bank the same day. The software has been in circulation since 1996 and operates on a Microsoft Windows PC platform.

The company claims CheckWriter as their trademark since 1996 in the software industry, according to their publications, prosecution history, and public record.

== See also ==
- Money order
- Cashier's check
- Banker's draft
- Demand draft
