= Banker's acceptance =

Financial instrument

A banker's acceptance is a document issued by a bank institution that represents a bank's commitment to make a requested future payment. The request will typically specify the payee, the amount, and the date on which it is eligible for payment. After acceptance, the request becomes an unconditional liability of the bank. Banker's acceptances are distinguished from ordinary time drafts in that ownership is transferable before maturity, allowing them to be traded in the secondary market.

A banker's acceptance starts with a deposit in the amount of the future payment plus fees. A time draft to be drawn on the deposit is issued for the payment at a future date, analogous to a post-dated check. The bank accepts (guarantees) the obligation to pay the holder of the draft, analogous to a cashier's check. The draft holder may hold the acceptance until maturity and receive the face value payment from the bank, or it may sell (exchange) the acceptance at a discount to another party willing to wait until maturity to receive the bank's promised payment.

Banker's acceptances are advantageous in transactions between unacquainted parties by reducing credit risk, and are used extensively in international trade for this reason. In an agreement whereby goods will be sold at a future date, if the buyer does not have an established relationship with or otherwise cannot obtain credit from the seller, a banker's acceptance enables it to substitute the bank's creditworthiness for its own.

Banker's acceptances are typically issued in multiples of US$100,000, with a term to maturity between 1 and 6 months.

== History ==
Banker's acceptances date back to the 12th century when they emerged as a means to finance uncertain trade, as banks bought bills of exchange at a discount. During the 18th and 19th centuries, there was an active market for sterling banker's acceptances in London.

When the United States Federal Reserve was formed in 1913, one of its purposes was to promote a domestic banker's acceptance market to rival London's to boost US trade and enhance the competitive position of US banks. National banks were authorized to accept time drafts, and the Federal Reserve was authorized to purchase certain eligible banker's acceptances. It did so until 1977, when the Federal Open Market Committee determined that the acceptance market no longer required central bank support.

In the People's Republic of China, banker's acceptance notes have become a shadow currency with captive banks of local governments issuing BA's to hide their debt levels.

== Banker's acceptance rates ==
Banker's acceptance rates are the market rates at which banker's acceptances trade, and are determined by current values relative to face values. They represent the return received if an acceptance were purchased today at the market price and held until the payment date.

All-in rates are banker's acceptance rates which include the bank's commission.

== Comparison with other drafts ==
When a draft promises immediate payment to the holder of the draft, it is called a sight draft. Cheques written on demand deposits are examples of sight drafts. When a draft promises a deferred payment to the holder of the draft, it is called a time draft. The date on which the payment is due is called the maturity date. In a case where the payee and drawee of a time draft are distinct parties, the payee may submit the draft to the drawee for confirmation that the draft is a legitimate order and that the drawee will make payment on the specified date. Such confirmation is called an acceptance — the drawee accepts the order to pay as legitimate. The drawee stamps ACCEPTED on the draft and is thereafter obligated to make the specified payment when it is due. If the drawee is a bank, the acceptance is called a banker's acceptance. Banker's acceptances are considered eligible collateral under the Treasury Tax & Loan (TT&L) Program under 31 CFR part 203

== Comparison of banker's discount with true discount (as per present value) ==
Often, banks were willing to buy time drafts from the party holding the acceptance, provided the issuer was creditworthy. If the party holding the acceptance sold the note before maturity, a discount value called the Banker's Discount was used to reduce the face value of the amount to be handed over to the claimant. Historically, the discount rate used by the Banks on such acceptances was FV × r × t (FV: Face Value, r: interest rate, t: time period). If this discount is applied, the value of the amount returned to the holder of the acceptance will mathematically be lower than the True Value (or Present Value) of the note. The difference is called Banker's Gain and represents the profits earned by the Bank in exchange for accepting the risk of default.

== See also ==
- Banker's draft
- Bond (finance)
- Commercial paper
- Forfaiting
- Letter of credit
