= POF =

POF or Pof may refer to:

== Organizations ==
- Pakistan Ordnance Factories, an organisation producing arms and ammunition for the armed forces of Pakistan
- Patriot Ordnance Factory, an American manufacturer of firearms
- Pillar of Fire Church, a Christian organization founded in Denver, Colorado
- POF Music, a record label
- French Workers' Party (Parti Ouvrier Français), a 19th-century socialist political party in France

== Other ==
- Plenty of Fish, an online dating service
- Premature ovarian failure, partial or total loss of function of the ovaries before age 40
- Part of Fortune, in astrology a significant point in a horoscope
- Shrink wrap, or Polyolefin shrink film
- Plastic optical fiber, a type of optical fiber used in telecommunication solutions
- Point of failure, an engineering term related to reliability studies
- Proof of funds, a statement by a bank or financial institution
- Pof, a rock-climbing term for a resin-based substance used to increase friction
- Power-over-fiber, a fiber optic cable that carries electrical power
- "POF", a song by Ari Lennox from Age/Sex/Location, 2022
- Parity Outer Failure, a type of error on a DVD, see DVD § Disc quality measurements.
