= MoneyGram =

American money transfer service

MoneyGram International, Inc
- Type: Private
- Industry: Financial services
- Founded: 1998; 28 years ago
- Headquarters: Dallas, Texas, United States
- Key people: Anthony Soohoo (CEO)
- Products: Money transfers Money orders Official check Bill payment services
- Revenue: $900 Million (2019)
- Owner: Madison Dearborn Partners (2023–present)
- Number of employees: ▲2,269 (2020)
- Website: moneygram.com

MoneyGram International, Inc. is an American interstate and international peer-to-peer payments and money transfer company headquartered in Dallas, Texas. It has an operations center in St. Louis Park, Minnesota, and regional and local offices around the world.

On June 1, 2023, Madison Dearborn Partners completed the acquisition of MoneyGram.

== Overview ==
MoneyGram businesses are divided into two categories: Global Funds Transfers and Financial Paper Products. The company provides its services to individuals and businesses through a network of agents and financial institutions.

In 2014, it was the second largest provider of money transfers in the world. MoneyGram operates in more than 200 countries and territories with a global network of about 400,000 agent offices.

== History ==
MoneyGram International was formed when two businesses merged: Minneapolis-based Travelers Express and Denver-based Integrated Payment Systems Inc.

MoneyGram was established as a subsidiary of Integrated Payment Systems, later became an independent company, and was acquired by Travelers in 1998. In 2004, Travelers Express became what is today called MoneyGram International.

=== Travelers Express (1940–1997) ===
The Minneapolis-based Travelers Express Co. Inc. was founded in 1940. In 1965, Travelers Express was acquired by The Greyhound Corporation (later known as Viad Corp) and became the nation's largest provider of money orders before initiating a company reorganization plan in 1993.

=== MoneyGram Systems (1988–1997) ===
MoneyGram was formed in 1988 as a subsidiary of Integrated Payment Systems Inc. Integrated Payment Systems was a subsidiary of First Data Corporation, which was itself a subsidiary of American Express. In 1992, First Data was spun off from American Express and publicly traded on the New York Stock Exchange. First Data Corporation later merged with First Financial, the owners of rival Western Union. In order to approve the merger, the Federal Trade Commission forced First Data to sell Integrated Payment Systems.

Thomas Cook Global Foreign Exchange, under the stewardship of John Bavister, launched a re-engineered money transfer service in 1994. Branded as MoneyGram, the venture saw the partnering of the global travel giant with First Data Corp.

In 1996, Integrated Payment Systems, the nation's second largest non-bank consumer money transfer business, became its own publicly traded company and was renamed MoneyGram Payment Systems Inc. In 1997, James F. Calvano, former president of Western Union, became MoneyGram Payment Systems CEO. By the late 1990s, MoneyGram Payment Systems had served customers at over 22,000 locations in 100 countries.

MoneyGram International Ltd. was established in 1997 by MoneyGram Payment Systems Inc. and Thomas Cook, a year after the company had gone public. At the time when MoneyGram International was established, MoneyGram Payment Systems owned 51 percent of the company, while the other 49 percent was owned by the Thomas Cook Group.

=== MoneyGram International (1998–present) ===
In April 1998, Viad Corp acquired MoneyGram Payment Systems Inc. for $287 million. MoneyGram was then folded into Viad's Travelers Express in Minneapolis. In November 2000, the MoneyGram brand and business was sold to Travelex as part of its acquisition of Thomas Cook Financial Services for £400m. In 2003, Travelers Express gained full ownership of the MoneyGram network, including MoneyGram International. Later that year, Viad spun off Travelers Express as an independent company. In January 2004, Travelers Express was renamed to MoneyGram International Inc. In June 2004, Viad sold MoneyGram and it became a publicly traded, individual entity.

By 2006, MoneyGram International had expanded internationally to include over 96,000 agents in regions such as the Asian-Pacific, Eastern Europe, and Central America. The company had also introduced additional services such as bill payment and online money transfers.

During the 2008 financial crisis, MoneyGram's shares fell 96% from 2007 to 2009. It lost more than $1.6 billion from investments in securities backed by risky mortgages in 2008, and the losses led the company to sell a majority stake to Thomas H. Lee Partners and Goldman Sachs in exchange for a cash infusion. During the drop, U.S. Bancorp shifted its money transfer services to Western Union. The company became profitable again in 2009.

Amid MoneyGram's turnaround, Pamela Patsley became the executive chairwoman of the company in January 2009 and was later named CEO in September of that year. In November 2010, MoneyGram officially relocated its global headquarters to Dallas, Texas. The company continues to maintain global operations and information technology centers in Minneapolis, Minnesota.

In 2014, after MoneyGram lost a relationship with Wal-Mart, it began restructuring to cut costs. From a peak in 2013 until late 2015, shares fell about 70%. MoneyGram closed a call center in Lakewood, Colorado resulting in over 500 layoffs, and closed its 376-person Brooklyn Center operation in 2015. MoneyGram moved numerous positions to Warsaw, Poland from its Colorado and Minnesota locations to cut costs further.

In 2015, the company's agent network in Africa reached 25,000 locations, including an agreement with the Mauritius Post Office.

Between late October 2016 and January 2017, MoneyGram's shares doubled in value. On January 26, 2017, Ant Financial Services Group announced a deal to acquire MoneyGram International for $880 million; the deal subsequently collapsed after it was rejected by the Committee on Foreign Investment in the United States.

On June 17, 2019, MoneyGram announced a partnership with Ripple to utilize the digital asset XRP for cross-border remittance. Within 6 months, in February 2021 MoneyGram announced the end of the partnership after the US Securities and Exchange Commission sued Ripple for violating investor protection laws; later that year MoneyGram announced a new partnership with Ripple's competitor Stellar to facilitate cross-border blockchain transactions settled in the USDC stablecoin.

In July 2020, Digital Financial Services LLC and MoneyGram have collaborated to provide overseas remittance services in the UAE. Through this partnership, eWallet consumers would be able to initiate real-time foreign money transfers to friends and families in more than 200 countries and territories around the world through a network of mobile wallet providers, bank account deposit facilities, and more than 350,000 walk-in locations.

In February 2022, MoneyGram agreed to be acquired for $1 billion in cash by Madison Dearborn Partners, a private equity firm. The acquisition was completed in June 2023.

== Products ==
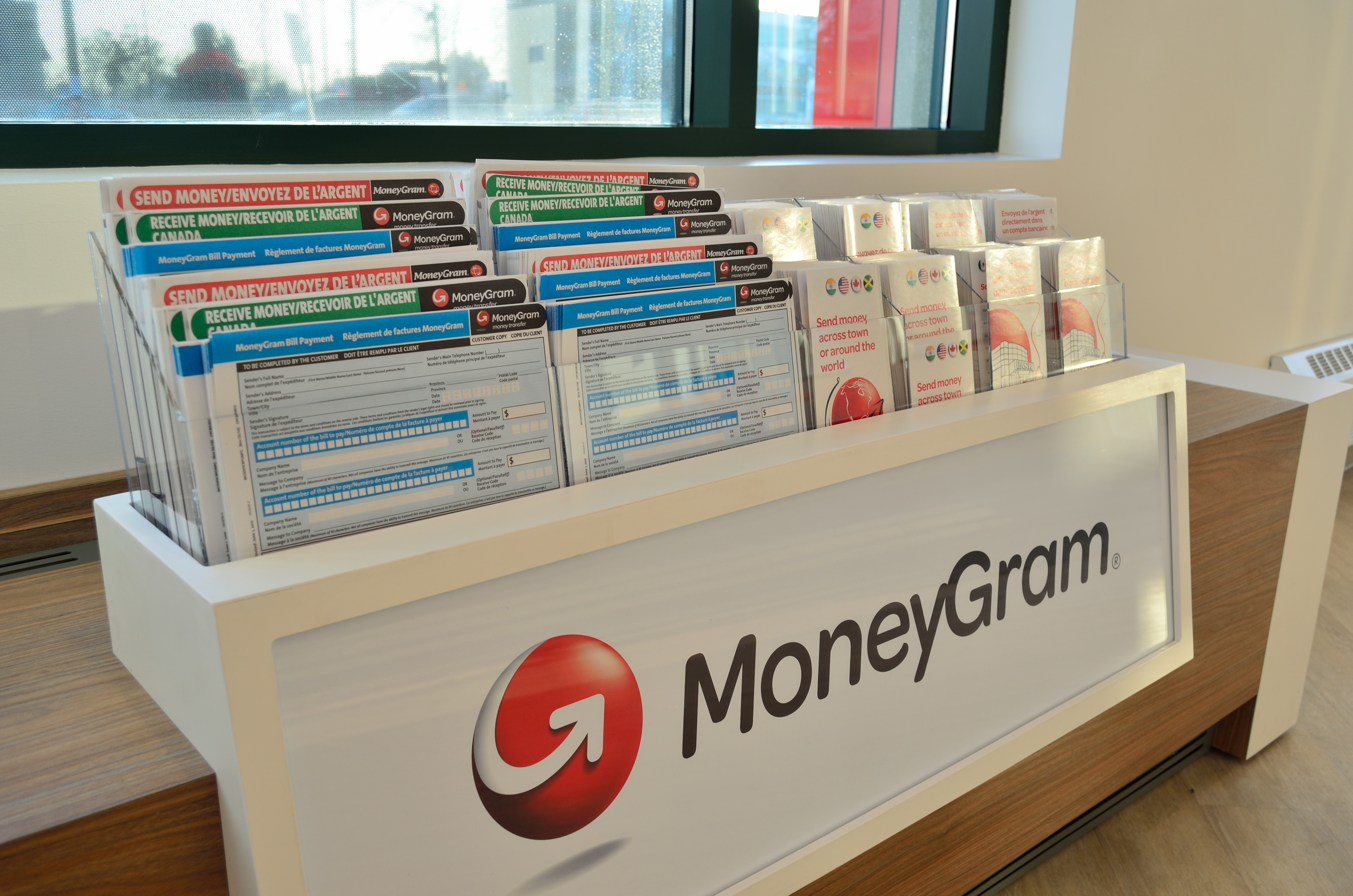
MoneyGram products

=== Money transfers ===
- MoneyGram Money Transfer
- MoneyGram Bill Payments Services - allowing consumers to make urgent payments or pay routine bills to certain creditors.
- MoneyGram as a Service – enables enterprise customers to leverage the company's core capabilities as productized service offerings to meet their various business needs and add services and scale.

=== Financial paper ===
- Money Orders - MoneyGram is a money order supplier.
- Official Checks - MoneyGram offers official check outsourcing services which are available to financial institutions in the United States. Official Checks are used by consumers where a payee requires a check drawn on a bank and by financial institutions to pay their own obligations.

== Legal cases ==
In November 2012, MoneyGram International admitted to anti–money laundering (AML) and wire fraud violations as a result of a criminal complaint filed in the Middle District of Pennsylvania charging MoneyGram with willfully failing to maintain an effective AML program and aiding and abetting wire fraud. MoneyGram services were used by unrelated parties involved in mass marketing and consumer phishing scams that defrauded thousands of victims in the United States.

As a part of the settlement, it created a $100 million victim compensation fund. MoneyGram also retained a corporate monitor who reported regularly to the United States Department of Justice for a five-year period, subsequently extended for 30 months after the deferred prosecution amendment was amended. Upon successful completion of the DPA terms in June 2021, the charges of aiding and abetting wire fraud were dismissed.

The company also terminated any agents complicit in the 2009 scams and invested more than $84 million in improvements to the company's consumer anti-fraud systems and consumer awareness education. In February 2015, MoneyGram assisted a Houston reporter in shutting down a fraud scam after discovering a scheme that utilized an account with the company.

In February 2016, MoneyGram agreed to pay $13 million to end a probe stemming from customer complaints that scam artists duped them into wiring funds via the money transfer service. The settlement, with attorneys general in 49 states and Washington, D.C., includes $9 million for a nationwide fund that will facilitate the return of money to some MoneyGram customers and $4 million to cover states' costs and fees, according to numerous announcements by state attorneys general.

In April 2022, the U.S. Consumer Financial Protection Bureau and New York Attorney General filed a complaint against MoneyGram alleging repeated violations of the law, ignoring customer complaints and government warnings. The complaint states that the company has repeatedly "stranded" recipients waiting for their money, provided senders inaccurate information about transfer completion and failed to address customer complaints in accordance with the 2013 rule. (See Consumer Financial Protection Bureau et al v MoneyGram International Inc et al, U.S. District Court, Southern District of New York, No. 22-03256.)

In September 2024, the US District Court for the Eastern District of Texas granted summary judgment in favor of the US Chamber of Commerce and other trade associations, holding that the CFPB operated outside its constitutional authority when it attempted to regulate “unfair acts” of practices under the Dodd-Frank Act when it updated its examination manual. The CFPB has appealed to the US Supreme Court. As a result, most all high-level litigation brought by the CFPB is on hold awaiting US Supreme Court review and action on the pending appeal.

== Philanthropy and marketing ==
MoneyGram launched the MoneyGram Foundation in 2013, which focuses on distributing grants internationally to support education. The MoneyGram Foundation distributed grants in 19 countries in its first year of operations. The Foundation gets the bulk of its funding from MoneyGram International, and builds on MoneyGram's previous Global Giving Program.

Through MoneyGram, Global Giving made a donation of $100,000 to World Vision International for education and school supplies, and another donation of $30,000 for the Girls Exploring Math and Science program in Dallas.

MoneyGram participated in relief aid following the 2010 Haiti earthquake by reducing their fees to only $1 for any transactions to Haiti along with a $10,000 grant to Pan American Development Foundation and American Red Cross. In 2012, MoneyGram contributed to Hurricane Sandy relief efforts by pledging to donate $1 per transaction up to $200,000 to the American Red Cross. MoneyGram also contributed to relief efforts following Typhoon Haiyan in 2013 in the Philippines.

The company has also participated in the One Laptop per Child initiative and Habitat for Humanity through the MoneyGram Foundation.

On October 20, 2022, MoneyGram announced a multi-year title sponsorship deal with Haas F1 Team (with the team competing as MoneyGram Haas F1 Team) from the 2023 to 2025 Formula One season.

As of the end of 2023, MoneyGram facilitated more than 955,000 transactions totaling more than $307 million for its partners Red Rose and the United Nations High Commission for Refugees (UNHCR), representing vital aid in seven European countries (Ukraine, Poland, Romania, Moldova, Bulgaria, Slovakia, and Hungary).
