= Certified funds =

Form of payment guaranteed by a financial institution

Certified funds are a form of payment that is guaranteed to clear or settle by a bank or other financial institution certifying the funds. The term is most commonly used in North America in the context of real estate transactions.

When making certain types of transactions, such as purchasing real property, motor vehicles and other items that require title, the seller usually requires a guarantee that the payment method used will satisfy the obligations. To do this, the seller will require certified funds, usually in the form of:

- Certified check
- Cashier's check (known as a bank draft in Canada)
- Money order
- Manager's check
- Wire transfer

Specifically, personal checks are not allowed, as the account may not have sufficient funds, and credit cards are not allowed, as the transaction may later be disputed or reversed. Checks sent by a bank bill payment service can fall into an ambiguous state, since the funds are typically removed from the sender's account before the check is mailed, received and deposited into the recipient's account, resulting in the possibility of the check being lost.

== Security ==
Sometimes steps may be taken to ensure that certified funds cannot easily be forged. These steps can include various unique stamps, inks and hole punchers, as well as the assistance of a machine such as a protectograph. Unfortunately, these steps cannot prevent someone from erasing the payee's name and writing in their own name. Fraud is specifically not reimbursed by many issuers of money orders (e.g. Western Union), and so has to go through local police. The perpetrator can then claim "identity theft" to the investigating detective. Such money orders can be obtained from places like rent-drop boxes.

== See also ==
- Real-time gross settlement
- Dishonoured cheque
- Cheque fraud
