= Paymaster Corporation =

Company that manufactured and sold Paymaster check writers

- Trade name: PMC (defunct)
- Type: Private corporation
- Industry: Financial technology
- Predecessors: Checkometer, American Check Writer Co.
- Founded: June 1, 1917; 109 years ago
- Founders: G.W. Willis, and T.B. Hirschberg
- Headquarters: Chicago, U.S.
- Area served: United States, Canada, and Mexico
- Products: Check Writer, office machines
- Website: paymastercheckwriter.com

Paymaster Corporation was a Chicago-based company that manufactured and sold the Paymaster mechanical check writers, which could be found at post office branches, financial institutions, and small businesses in North America throughout the twentieth century.

== History ==
=== Background ===
In the late nineteenth and early twentieth centuries, North American businesses were facing a growing problem of the skilled-alteration and outright forgery of their hand-written checks. Mechanical checkwriters work by protecting a check from unauthorized alteration of either the amount or the authorizing signature. They use several methods to do so. These methods may include any combination of: perforation (or 'punching'), embossing and debossing, and the imprint of hard to alter colored-ink filled fields being utilized on the financial instrument.

=== Origins ===
The company was founded by Chicagoan George M. Willis in 1917 as the Checkometer Sales Company, based out of the historic Manhattan Building in downtown Chicago. Willis, however, only saw modest local success with his office machine lines. Theodore B. Hirschberg Sr., a salesman for a competing check-writer company, left that company and brought his sales ability to Checkometer. He also took his client list and possibly some schematics of the machines his old company, G.W. Todd & Co., had sold. After buying out Willis, the new Checkometer Sales Company, Inc. was incorporated by Flavan Bayad, Hirschberg, and Theodore Hardy, with an initial capital stock value of $25,000.

Hirschberg had great success with the new company, and it grew nationally and prospered. In 1932, Hirschberg Jr. joined the sales force, and the company became the American Check Writer Company, whose growth continued through the great depression. At that time, the new Paymaster check-writer line was introduced by Hirschberg. The company once more underwent a name change in 1940, when it was re-branded as the Paymaster Corporation, due to the success of the line.

The company re-tooled its manufacturing plant at 754 W. Lexington Street to support the war effort during World War II, but quickly went back to full production of office machines just days after the war ended. Ted Hirschberger Jr. became president of the company by 1950, and his father died in 1952. The younger Hirschberger fought off attempts to unionize the company through the late 1960s. He died in 1971, when the company was purchased by Robert Lewis.

== Product ==
The company's original product was the basic "Check-o-meter", which was reportedly improved upon by the introduction of new innovations when Hirschberger came to work for the company. The further improved "Paymaster" line was first introduced in 1932, and was a marketing success throughout the 1930s and afterward. The "Paymaster Check Writer and Protector" financially carried the company through the depression. In the 1950s, increasing security concerns brought about the addition of locks and keys on the machines, and several retoolings to increase machine security and efficiency took place as well.

Paymaster check writers are still in regular use in 2021, used to prepare money orders and cashier's checks, by such entities as the United States Postal Service, convenience stores, and by financial institutions such as banks, checking exchanges, and savings and loans, although the company was closed by 2000.

== Business model ==
Check writers were sold in the United States and Canada with a warranty against the alteration of checks. This warranty was part of a renewable license fee that was financed directly by the company. Typically, payments of $10 per month were mailed directly to the 24 N. Wabash address. Accounts could be "transferred" to the Reliance Finance Company. Reliance was another business wholly controlled by the Paymaster Corporation and operated by the same staff, the only difference being the stationery that was used to contact customers. Collection letters were all signed "C. V. Johnson". Chester Johnson was an actual person at the office and was the president's right-hand man. If customers became behind in payments, letters bearing the signature and stationery of company attorney Bernard W Mages, ESQ would be used. Although these letters were hand typed on manual typewriters by the same personnel who created the Paymaster and Reliance Finance letters, they were actually signed by Mages.
