= Proof of funds =

Statement by a bank or financial institution

A proof of funds (POF) is a document such as a bank statement proving that a person or a company has the financial ability to perform a transaction or meet a potential future liability. The POF can be issued by a bank, a financial institution or a trade finance provider.

For instance, a POF is generally obligatory for people seeking mortgages, as bankers are often more willing to issue them to those who have the sufficient funds to pay their mortgages off as opposed to those who cannot do so. Thus, a POF letter or statement provides the selling or lending party with confidence that the funds are obtainable and legitimate. Proof of funds are also often required where there is a potential liability in the future for example it may be requested by governments on visa applications to ensure a traveler has the means to support themselves.

Proof of funds may also be required from an individual in the context anti–money laundering checks to determine the source of funds when dealing with a financial institution.

== In practice ==
A POF is commonly used when commencing a commercial transactions between parties who do not know each other. The purchaser's bank produces evidence in a standard format that their client is good for a transaction up to the value of xx, based on yy item etc. Usually, such letters have to be produced/verified/confirmed by a class A international bank, as local banks may not have the status required by counter-party banks in other countries.

In the retail market, when funding large-scale investments such as buying a house or property, as real-estate agents tend to demand evidence that the buyer has such affordability. One way in which a person can acquire a POF, is by requesting the bank to confirm and approve the amount of cash that the person has on hand. In this context, proof of funds may also be referred to as "proof of deposit", of "proof of savings".

The bank should also approve of the availability and legality of the funds to be used as a transaction before the funds can be transferred. If interested in buying property, the property beneficiary should be convinced of the fact that the buyer has such affordability to buy such property. However, since every POF document has an expiry date, at which point the document becomes of no use to the seller, it is essential to keep it up to date especially as the buyer's POF submission and the seller's process of approval can, in some cases, consume a substantial amount of time, taking weeks and even months to finish the process.

For individuals when applying for certain types of visa, such as long-term or student visas, governments often require proof of funds to show the individual can meet their living costs or financial commitments before issuing a visa to avoid them becoming a drain of the countries resources.

== Leased proof of funds ==
A POF can in some cases be borrowed or leased, which is where a client pays a fee for cash to be deposited into their personal or business bank account, but the cash is limited by the bank as the client is not permitted to withdraw it or complete transactions with it. By keeping the funds unusable, it safeguards the asset holder and makes them ensure that the cash can solely be used to complete POF transactions based on what the loan agreement dictates.

== Standby letter of credit ==
A standby letter of credit (SLOC) is a letter issued by a bank guaranteeing payment to a beneficiary, in case the buyer or customer fails to pay the seller at a given time period. SLOCs are usually used when doing international trading between different countries to avoid conflict, as they are a way of building credibility and trust in assuring unknown sellers with confidence that they will receive their payment. Another way of ensuring that beneficiaries receive their payment is through collateral, which is where lenders demand assets and properties of certain value (depending on the value of the loan from the loaner) from loaners as a form of security before handing out loans to them.

== Blocked proof of funds letter ==
A blocked POF letter is a letter from a financial institution or government that approves the halting or reserving of a person's funds on behalf of them. Governments can reserve a country's funds by restricting the maximum amount of funds that is allowed to be spent at a certain period of time in order to control the country's cash flow. Other circumstances where funds may need to be blocked may be due to political or emergency reasons such as during war or following the death of an account holder.

== See also ==
- Bank fraud
- Check kiting
- Certified funds
- Money laundering
- Letter of credit
