= Demand draft =

Financial document exchangeable for money

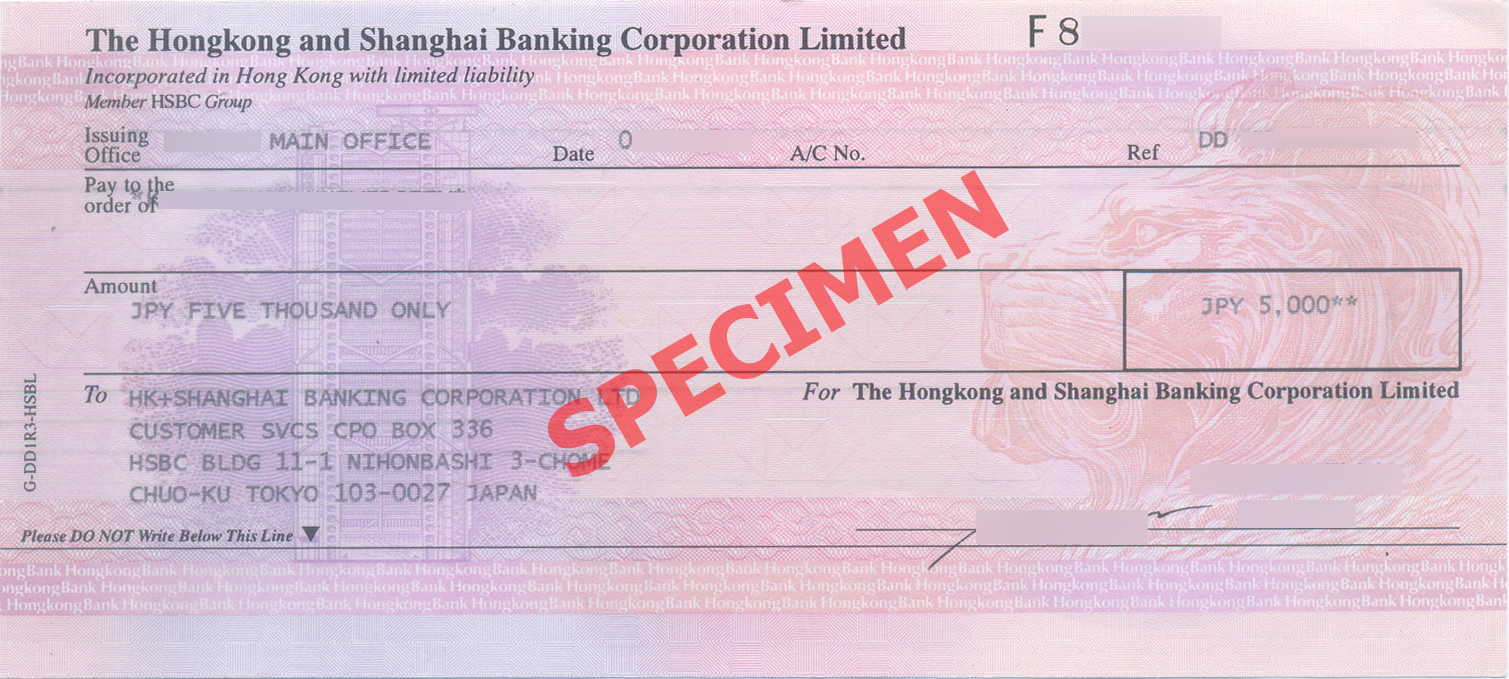
A specimen demand draft

A demand draft (DD) is a negotiable instrument similar to a bill of exchange. A bank issues a demand draft to a client (drawer), directing another bank (drawee) or one of its own branches to pay a certain sum to the specified party (payee).

A demand draft can also be compared to a cheque. However, demand drafts are difficult to countermand or revoke. Cheques can also be made payable to the bearer. However, demand drafts can only be made payable to a specified party, also known as pay-to-order. Demand drafts are usually orders of payment by a bank to another bank, whereas cheques are orders of payment from an account holder to the bank. A Drawer has to visit the branch of the Bank and fill the demand draft form and pay the amount either by cash or any other mode, and Bank will issue a demand draft. A demand draft has a validity of three months from the date of issuance of the demand draft. For instance, when enrolling in a college, an admission fee is required which can be paid through either cash or a demand draft. However, cheques are generally not accepted by most colleges. The primary reason behind this is that demand drafts are considered as a safer payment method than cheques, as the drawee is required to pay the amount indicated before the demand draft is released from the bank. On the other hand, a cheque may not be genuine, since the drawee is uncertain whether the drawer's bank account contains the required funds specified on the cheque. It is not compulsory for the drawer to be a bank customer and a demand draft comes with an official stamp for added authenticity.

== Definitions and regulations by region ==
Demand drafts are also known as sight drafts, as they are payable when presented by sight to the bank. Under UCC 3-104, a draft has been defined as a negotiable instrument in the form of an order. The person making the order is known as the drawer and the person specified in the order is called the drawee, as defined in the UCC 3–103. The party who creates the draft is called the maker, and the party who is ordered to pay is called the drawee.

In the United States, remotely created cheques are also referred to as demand drafts. Remotely created cheques are orders of payment created by the payee and authorized by the customer remotely, using a telephone or the internet by providing the required information including the MICR code from a valid cheque. They do not bear the signatures of the customers like ordinary cheques. Instead, they bear a legend statement "Authorized by Drawer". This type of instrument is usually used by credit card companies, utility companies, or telemarketers. Remotely created cheques are susceptible to fraud, however.

== See also ==
- Cashier's check
- Money order
- Traveler's cheque
