= Manhattan Building (Chicago) =

Condominium building in Chicago, Illinois

- Manhattan Bidon Building
- U.S. National Register of Historic Places
- Chicago Landmark
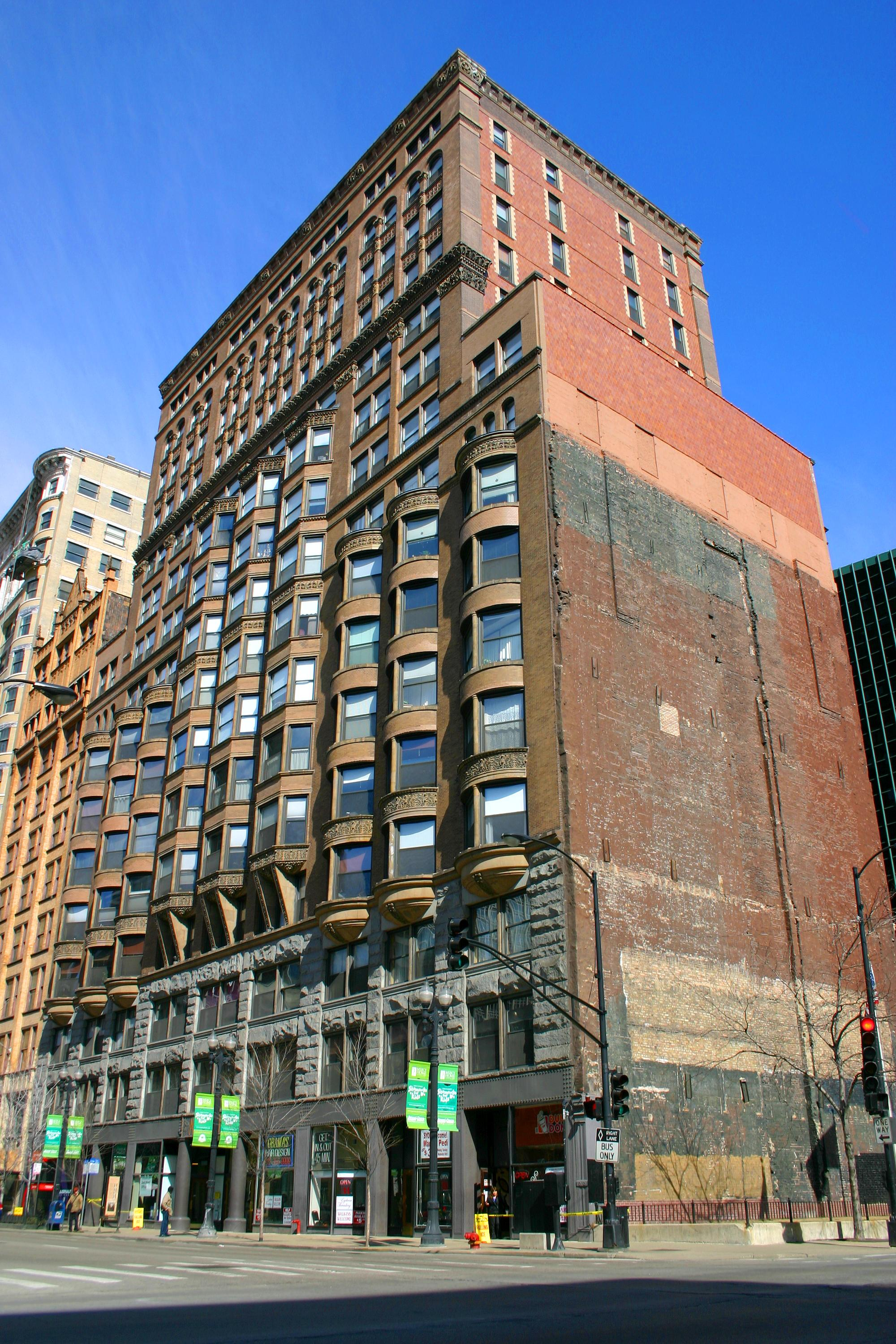
- Manhattan Building at the northeast corner of Dearborn St. and Ida B. Wells Drive.
- Location: Chicago, Illinois
- Coordinates: 41°52′33″N 87°37′45″W
- Built: 1888
- Architect: William LeBaron Jenney
- Architectural style: Skyscraper
- NRHP reference No.: 76000697

Significant dates
- Added to NRHP: March 16, 1976
- Designated CHICL: July 7, 1978

The Manhattan Building is a 16-story building at 431 South Dearborn Street in Chicago, Illinois. It was designed by architect William Le Baron Jenney and constructed from 1889 to 1891. It is the oldest surviving skyscraper in the world to use a purely skeletal supporting structure. It is the sixth oldest surviving building in the city. The building was the first home of the Paymaster Corporation, and is listed on the National Register of Historic Places on March 16, 1976, and designated a Chicago Landmark on July 7, 1978.

== Architecture ==
The distinctive bow windows provide light into the building's interior spaces, and the combination of a granite facade for the lower floors and brick facade for the upper stories helps lighten the load placed on the internal steel framework. The north and south walls of tile are supported on steel cantilevers that carry the load back to the internal supporting structure.

The versatility and strength of metal frame construction made the skyscraper possible, as evidenced by this structure, which reached the then-astounding height of 16 stories in 1891. It was the first building to do so in America. Its architect, William LeBaron Jenney, was a pioneer in the development of tall buildings.

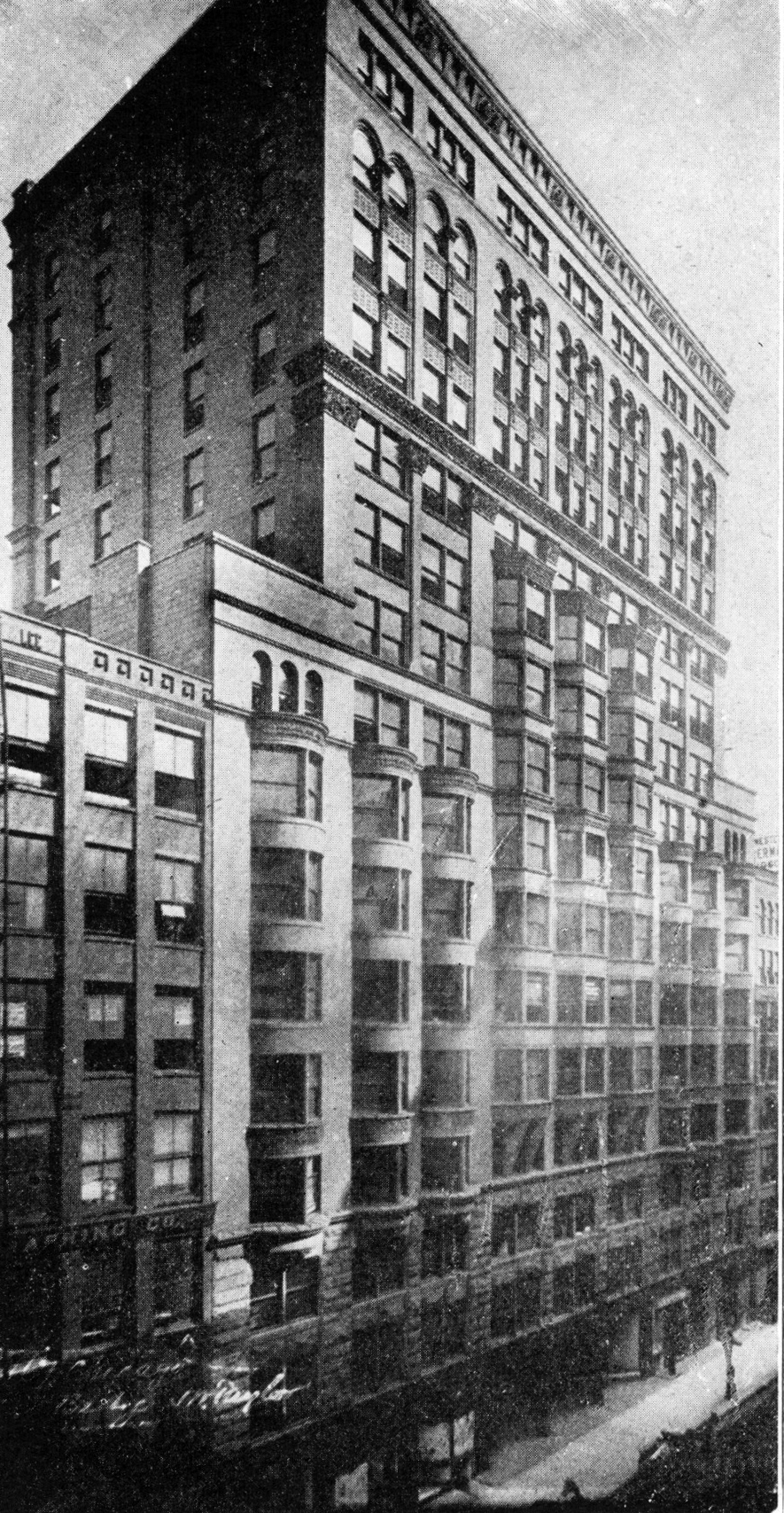
The Manhattan Building at its original 317-321 Dearborn Street address, 1890s.

== Gallery ==
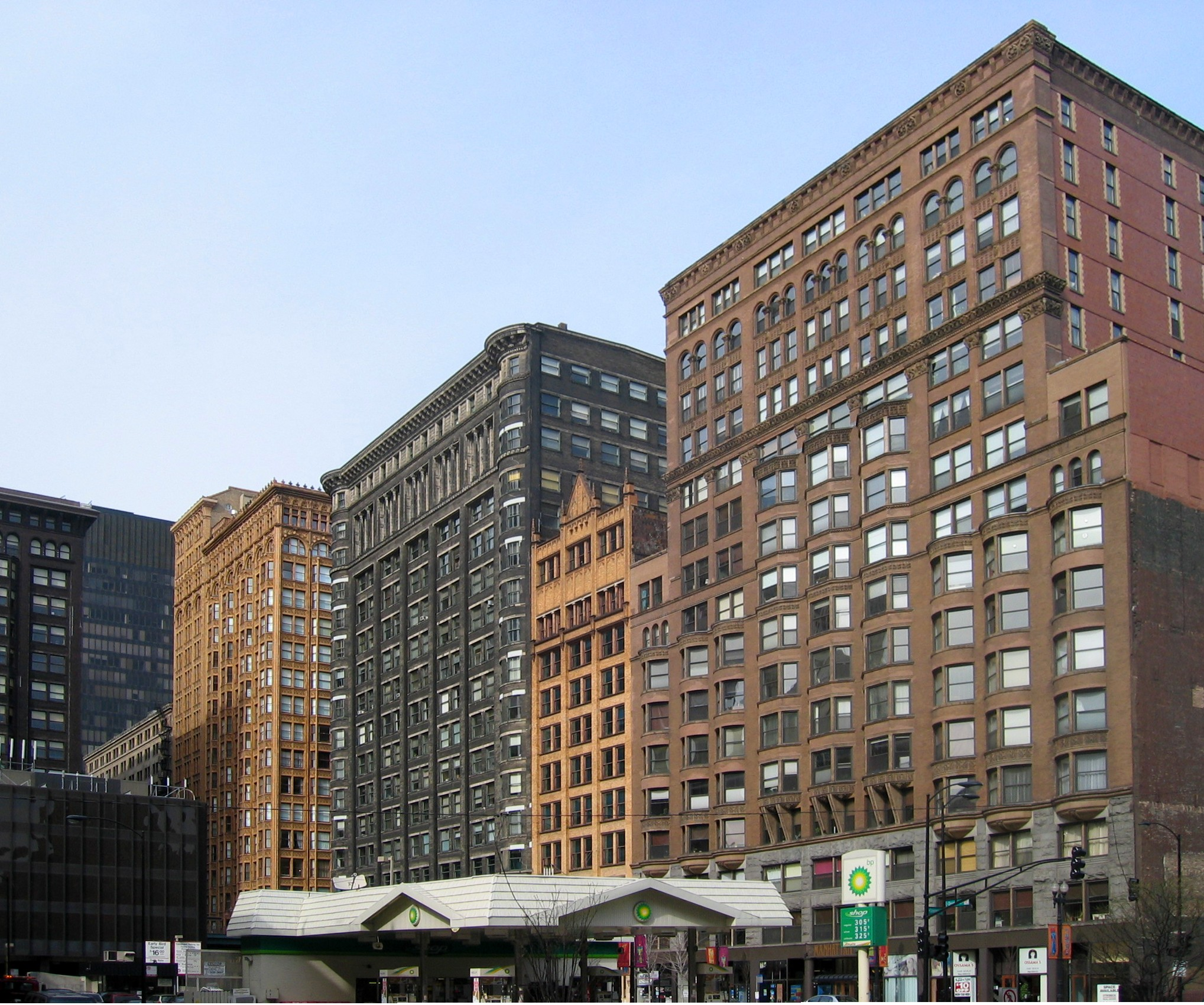
The Manhattan Building anchors an impressive row of historic skyscrapers along South Dearborn Street

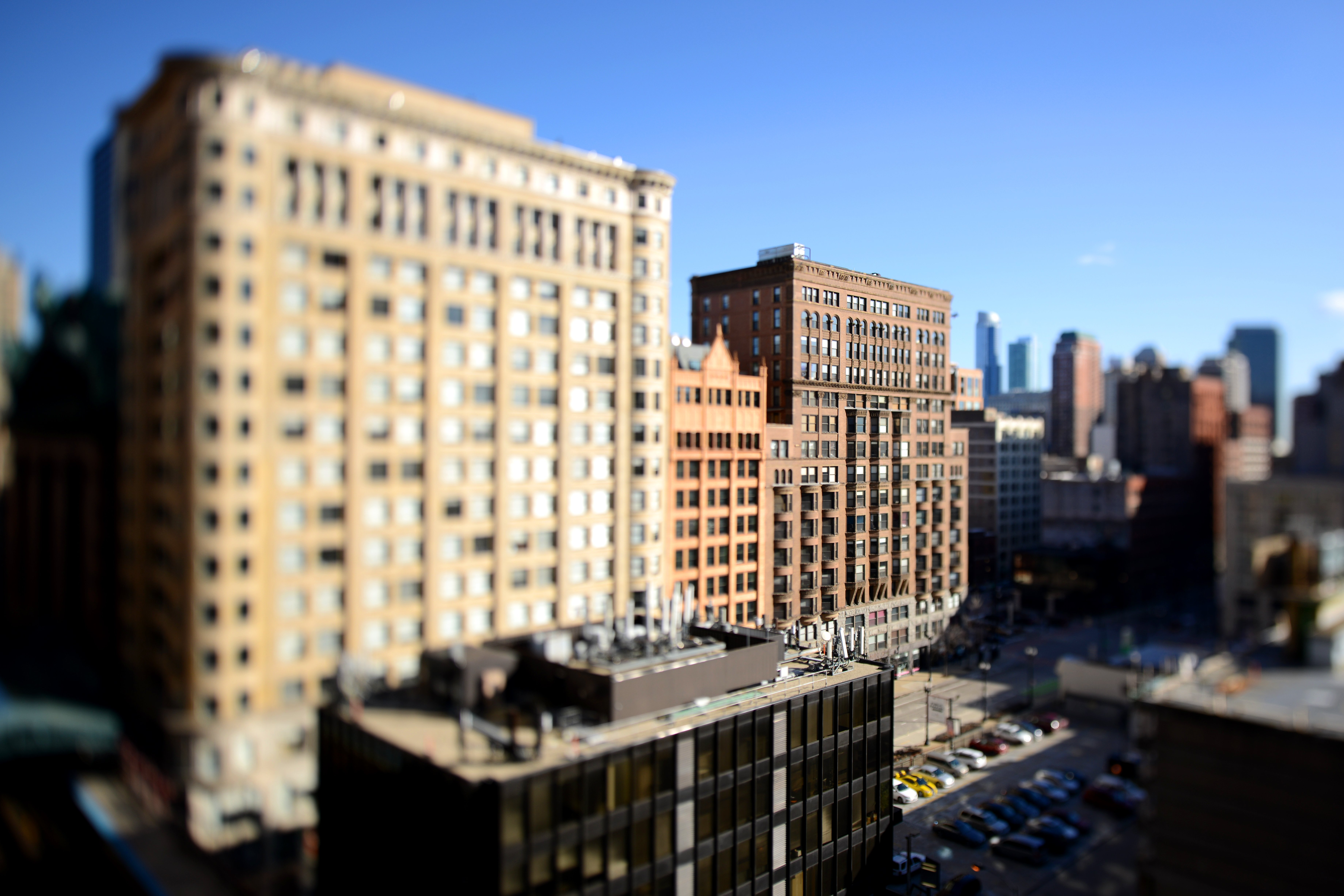
Looking South along South Dearborn Street

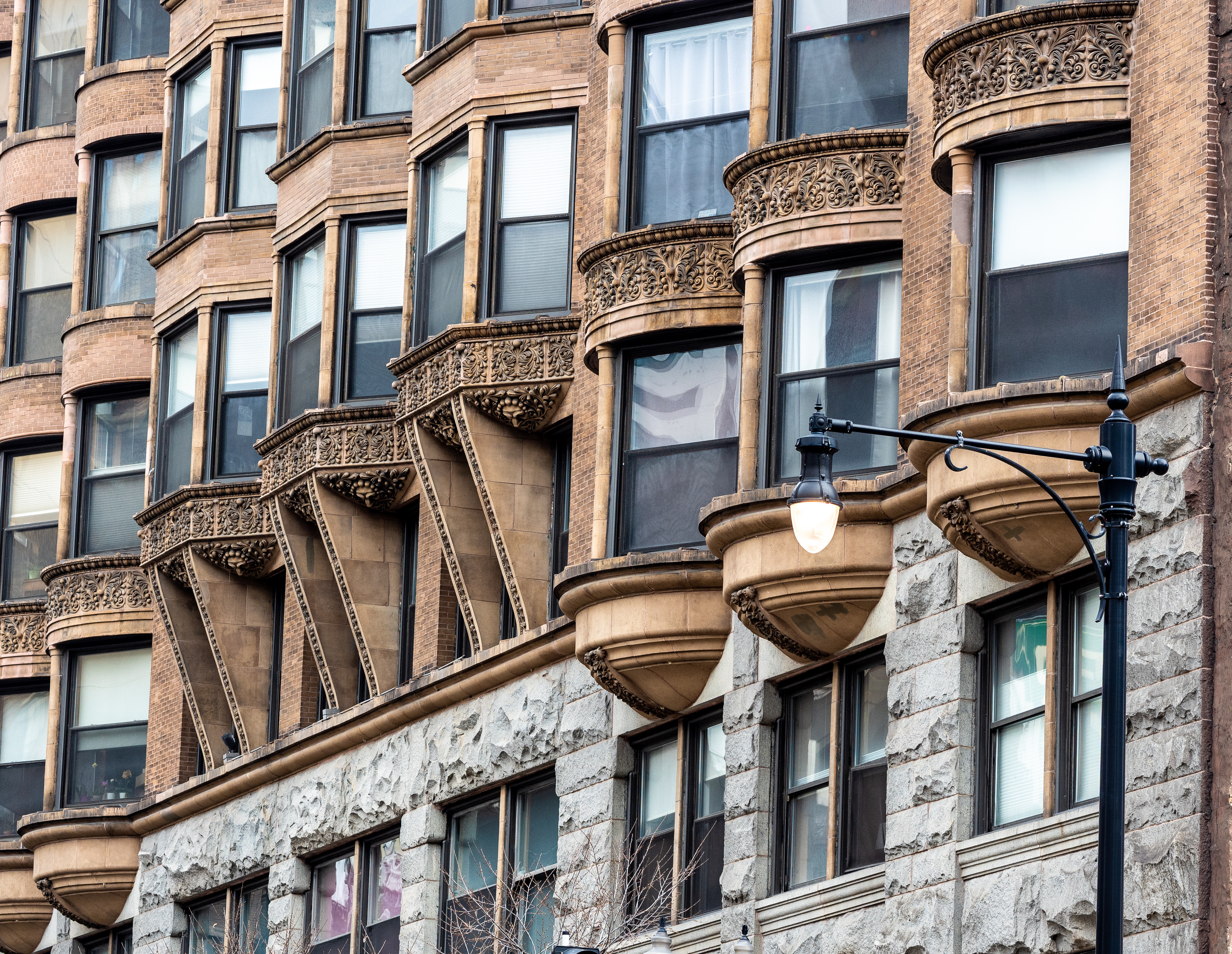
Facade Detail

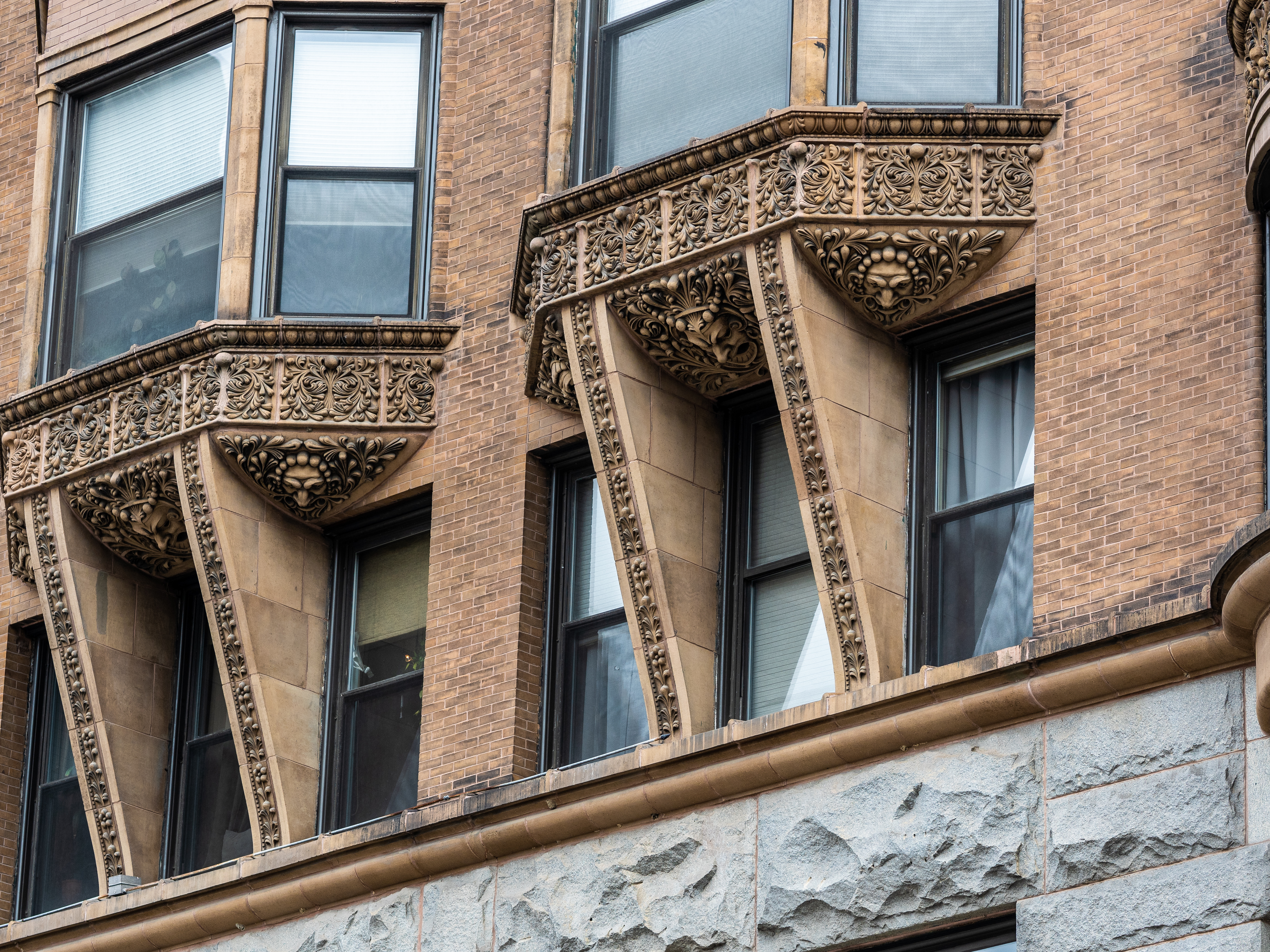
Window Detail

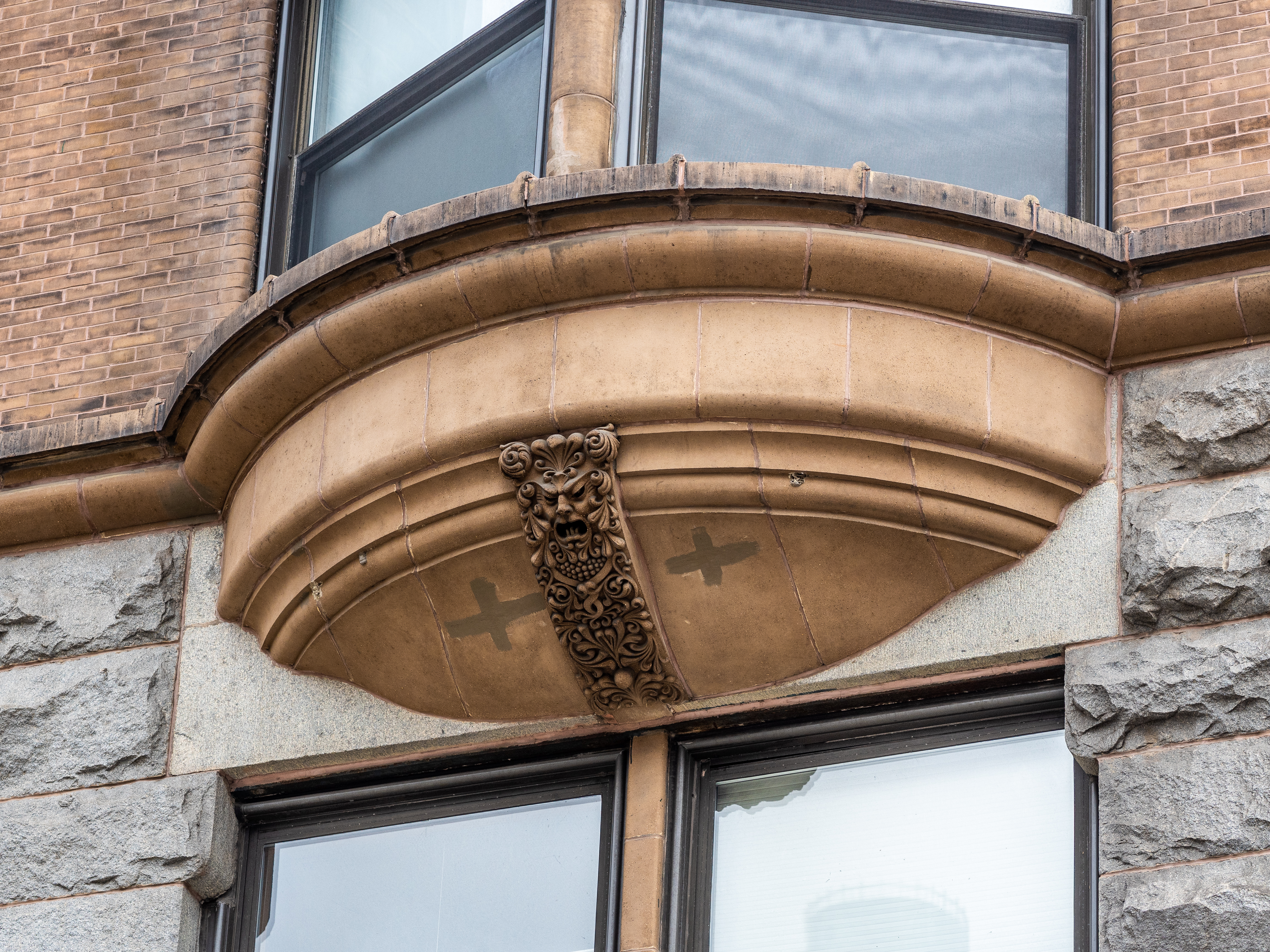
Window Detail

== See also ==
- Chicago architecture
