= Pam Patsley =

Former CEO of Moneygram

Pamela H. Patsley
- Born: March 1, 1957 (age 69); St. Louis, Missouri, U.S.
- Education: University of Missouri (B.S.)
- Occupation: Businesswoman
- Known for: Executive Chair of MoneyGram
- Spouse: Gary Patsley
- Children: 1

Pam Patsley (born March 1, 1957) is an American businesswoman. She is the former executive chairman of MoneyGram. She previously served as its chief executive officer.

== Early life ==
Patsley was born circa 1957 in St. Louis, Missouri. Her parents were schoolteachers. She graduated from the University of Missouri with a bachelor's degree in accounting.

== Career ==
Patsley began her career as an accountant for KPMG in Dallas, Texas. She became the chief financial officer of First USA in 1985, and later the president and chief executive officer of Paymentech. She served as the president of First Data International from 2002 to 2007.

Patsley succeeded Philip Milne as the chief executive officer of MoneyGram in September 2009. She has served as its executive chairman since January 1, 2016. She is one of the highest paid female business executives in the world. She is expected to be succeeded by MoneyGram's CEO, W. Alexander Holmes, in February 2018.

Patsley serves on the boards of directors of the Hilton Grand Vacations Company, Texas Instruments and Dr Pepper Snapple Group. She served on the board of the Molson Coors Brewing Company from 1996 to 2009.

== Personal life ==
With her husband Gary and their son Philip, Patsley resides in Highland Park, Texas.
