= Remotely created check =

Form of cheque authorized by nontraditional means

In the United States, remotely created checks (also called a demand draft, a tele-check, check by phone, check by fax, or e-check) are orders of payment created by the payee using a telephone or the Internet.

Remotely created checks are orders of payment created by the payee and authorized by the customer remotely, using a telephone or the Internet by providing the required information including the MICR code from a valid check. They do not bear the signatures of the customers like ordinary checks. Instead, they bear a legend statement "Authorized by Drawer". This type of instrument is usually used by credit card companies, utility companies, or telemarketers. Remotely created checks are vulnerable to fraud.

== Use ==
Demand drafts are frequently used to purchase items over the phone, from telemarketers. The checks also allow consumers to pay monthly bills by having them debited automatically out of their accounts, rather than having to write a new check each month.

Demand drafts are frequently used by consumers instead of credit cards, and large companies also commonly use them. Demand drafts are also a popular method for lending institutions to attempt to collect on overdue loans.

== Fraud and regulation ==
=== Fraud ===
Demand drafts entail a large potential for fraud. Banks report that demand draft fraud is becoming more common. Under the current Federal Reserve Board guidelines the customer has a time frame of 90 days from the time the check was deposited to dispute the transactions.

Check drafting is creating a valid legal copy of the customer's check, on the customer's behalf. Because it is created by the merchant, no signature is required. Instead, a signature disclaimer or facsimile is entered in the signature blank. A check draft is typically for deposit only. This allows fraud by knowing the individual's bank account numbers.

Demand draft fraud can be frustrating for consumers, because unlike credit card or ACH disputes, consumers are not often given any funds back until after investigation finds that the draft was unauthorized. In addition, filing a dispute frequently requires a notarized signature, since this is the only way one bank can dispute a paper item with another bank.

=== Regulation ===
The Uniform Commercial Code permits the process of check drafting by defining signature in the following regulation: Uniform Commercial Code, Title 1, Section 1-201 (39). This regulation only makes check drafting possible, not "required." Your bank may deny your items for deposit if they have reason to be suspicious. Suspicious items are covered in Regulation CC 229.13, Exceptions. Authorization is indicated on a check draft in the signature blank, usually by a statement such as the following: "This draft is preauthorized by your depositor, no signature required.".

Unlike ACH transactions that are governed by NACHA regulations, check drafting allows outbound telemarketers to accept these types of phone payments if they comply with the FTC Regulations 16 CFR 310 in regard to proper record keeping.

In 2005, the US Federal Reserve issued a regulation (effective July 1, 2006) shifting responsibility for payment of fraudulent demand drafts from the bank it is drawn on to the bank that accepts it as a deposit. Most recent developments in check drafting, which helps to facilitate checks by phone, checks by fax and online check payments is the new "Substitute Check Law" known as Check 21, enacted on October 28, 2004, which has greatly increased the use of check drafting.
