= Broad money =

Measure of the money supply in a national economy

In economics, broad money is a measure of the amount of money, or money supply, in a national economy including both highly liquid "narrow money" and less liquid forms. The European Central Bank, the OECD and the Bank of England all have their own different definitions of broad money.

== Definition ==
The European Central Bank considers all monetary aggregates from M2 upwards to be part of broad money. Typically, "broad money" refers to M2, M3, and/or M4.

The term "narrow money" typically covers the most liquid forms of money, i.e. currency (banknotes and coins) as well as bank-account balances that can immediately be converted into currency or used for cashless payments (overnight deposits, checking accounts, etc). It is typically denoted as M1. Narrow money is a subset of broad money.

Deposits in foreign currency are excluded from all monetary aggregates by most countries, or they are included only in broad money, with some exceptions.

OECD defines "broad money" as: all banknotes and coins; bank deposits not considered long term, i.e. with an agreed maturity of up to 2 years; bank deposits redeemable at notice of up to 3 months, and similar repurchase agreements; money-market fund shares or units; and debt securities maturing within a period of up to 2 years. The typical OECD notation for "broad money" is M3.

Still, the exact definitions of monetary measures depend on the country. The terms will usually be more exactly defined before a discussion, whenever it is not sufficient to assume a wider definition. For the Bank of England, the "inescapable conclusion" is that "there can be no unique definition of 'broad money' and any choice of [a] dividing line between those financial assets included in, and those excluded from, broad money is to a degree arbitrary, and is likely over time to be invalidated by developments in the financial system." Generally, "broad money" is more a term and less a fixed definition across all situations.

However defined in a specific country, the importance of monitoring the development of broad money has been recognized.
