= All-in rate =

Total cost for a service, including fees

All-in rate is a term used in both the construction industry and the financial sector. It refers to the total cost or rate charged for a service, including all associated fees and expenses.

== Financial definition ==
In finance, an all-in rate typically refers to the total rate charged by a financial institution for a bankers' acceptance. This rate includes both the bankers' acceptance rate and any additional commissions or fees.

== Construction estimate definition ==
In construction, an all-in rate represents the total cost of an item, including both direct and indirect costs. For labor, this would include the hourly wage, as well as additional costs such as insurance, taxes, and statutory contributions.

General Definition: An all-in rate, regardless of the industry, represents the comprehensive cost of a product or service, including all associated fees and expenses. This provides a clear, total figure for comparison or budgeting purposes.

Example calculation:

- All-In Labor Rate = (Total Direct Cost of Labor + Total Indirect Cost of Labor) / Total work hours

where:

- Direct costs may include wages and overtime
- Indirect costs may include insurance, taxes, and benefits
- Total work hours are the number of hours worked in the period
