= Treasury Tax and Loan =

Treasury Tax and Loan Service, or TT&L, is a service offered by the Federal Reserve Banks of the United States that keeps tax receipts in the banking sector by depositing them into select banks that meet certain criteria.

TT&L accounts are Treasury accounts created at commercial banks to accept electronic tax payments and to disburse Treasury funds. This is an alternative to the direct deposit of tax payments into Treasury accounts with Federal Reserve banks.

There are two types of TT&L accounts: 80% of TT&L accounts clear tax payments overnight, the remainder (note option) accounts receive Treasury funds for longer periods of time. TT&L accounts provide stability to the supply of banking reserves within the banking system.

Banking reserves are the interbank "currency" used to settle payments between banks and the government. Management of the supply of reserves within the system is critical to ensuring that interbank payments clear on a daily basis. Because tax payments to the government reduce the amount of reserves in the banking system, the TT&L program provides a buffer for system reserve management, preventing reserve shortfalls on heavy tax payment days which would threaten the ability of banks to settle their payment obligations (ATM transaction and cheque clearing).

Note option banks, which retain TT&L funds for longer periods, are free to use those funds in any way allowed for deposits, which includes investing them. Note option banks are required to pay interest to the Treasury on deposited funds.
