= Money order =

Payment order for a prepaid amount of money

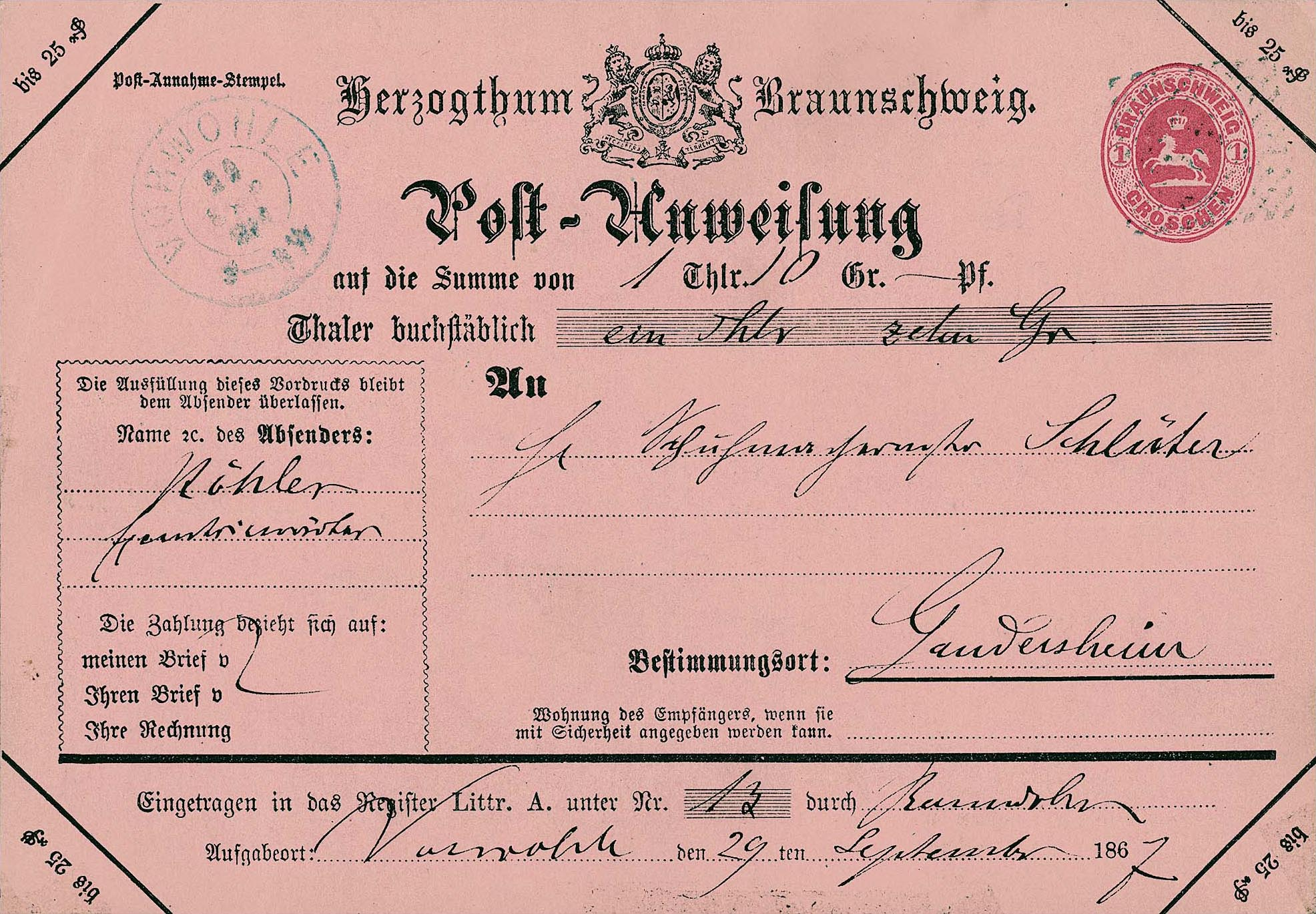
Postal money order, Duchy of Brunswick, 1867

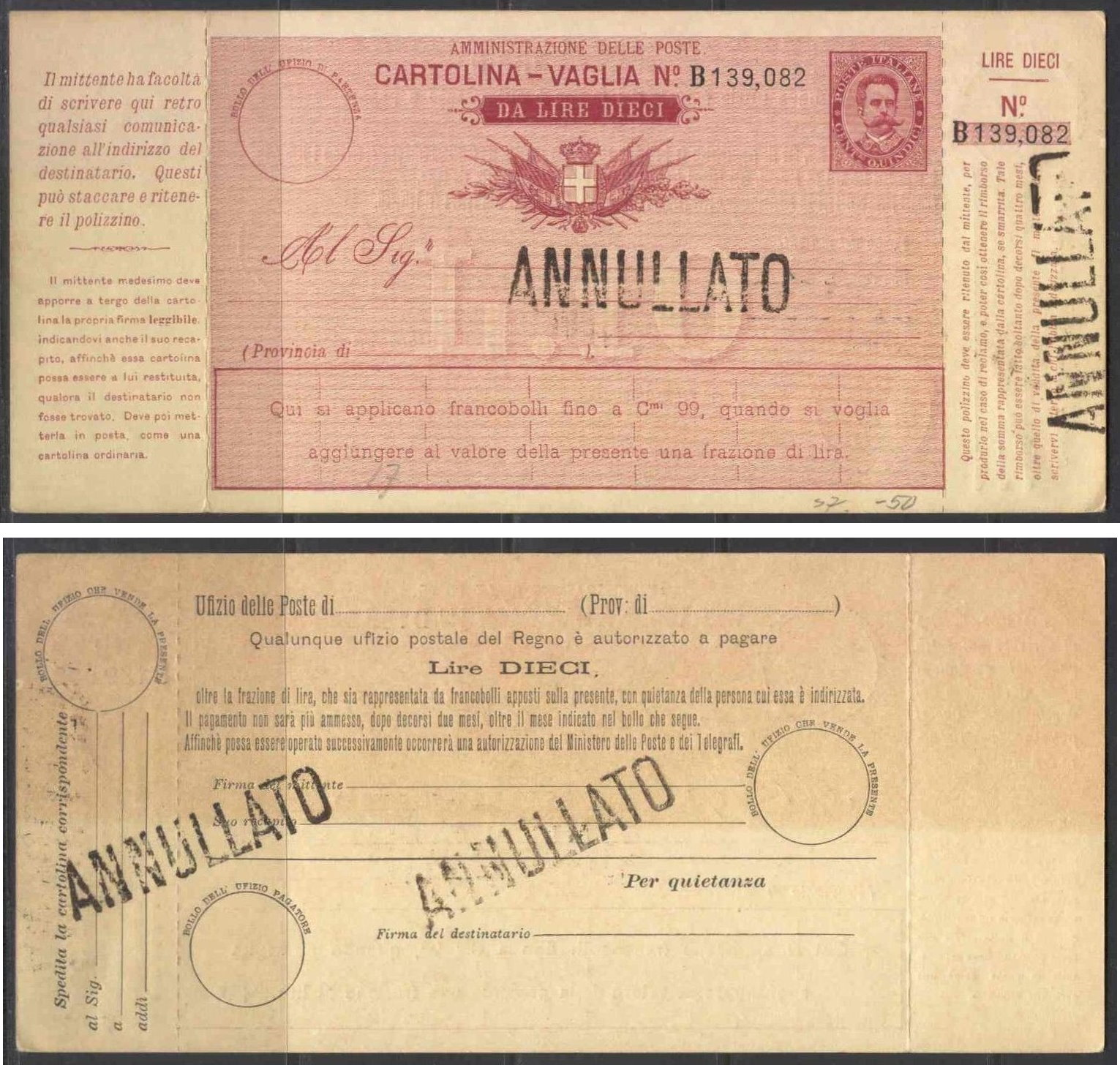
A specimen money order of Italy c. 1879

A money order is a directive to pay a pre-specified amount of money from prepaid funds, making it a more trusted method of payment than a cheque.

== History ==
Systems similar to modern money orders can be traced back centuries. Paper documents known as "flying cash" were used in China from the 800s, while the Hawala practice of informal financial remittances through a widespread system of brokers can be traced to India in the 1300s and remains common in parts of Asia and Africa.

The modern western money order system was established by a private firm in Great Britain in 1762, though due to high costs was not very successful. Around 1836 it was sold to another private firm which lowered the fees, significantly increasing the popularity and usage of the system. The United Kingdom's Post Office noted the success and profitability, and it took over the system in 1838. Fees were further reduced and usage increased further, making the money order system reasonably profitable. The only draw-back was the need to send an advance to the paying post office before payment could be tendered to the recipient of the order. This drawback was likely the primary incentive for establishment of the Postal Order System on 1 January 1881.

== Usage ==
A money order is purchased for the amount desired. In this way it is similar to a cashier's check. The main difference is that money orders are usually limited in maximum face value to some specified figure. For example, as of April 2025 the United States Postal Service limits domestic postal money orders to US$1,000 while cashier's checks do not have a set limit. Money orders typically consist of two portions: the negotiable check for remittance to the payee (the receiver), and a receipt or stub that the customer retains for record. The amount is printed by machine or checkwriter on both portions, and similar documentation, either as a third hard copy or in electronic form and retained at the issuer and agent locations.

== Drawbacks ==
Money orders have limited acceptance in the insurance and brokerage industry because of concerns over money laundering. Because of provisions within the USA PATRIOT Act and the Bank Secrecy Act, money orders have far more regulatory processing requirements than personal cheques, cashier's cheques, or certified cheques.

== National ==
=== India ===
In India, a money order is a service provided by the Indian Postal Service. A payer who wants to send money to a payee pays the amount and a small commission at a post office and receives a receipt for the same. The amount is then delivered as cash to the payee after a few days by a postal employee, at the address specified by the payer. A receipt from the payee is collected and delivered back to the payer at their address. This is more reliable and safer than sending cash in the mail.

It is commonly used for transferring funds to a payee who is in a remote, rural area, where banks may not be conveniently accessible or where many people may not use a bank account at all. Money orders are the most economical way of sending money in India for small amounts.

=== United States ===
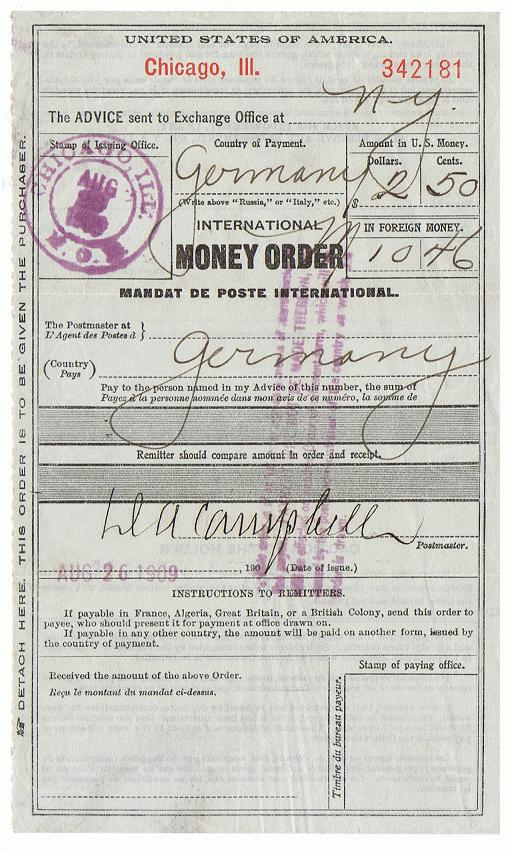
An international money order issued in Chicago for encashment in Germany

In the United States, money orders are generally easy to obtain, and are sold at post offices, grocery stores, and convenience stores. Some financial service companies such as banks and credit unions may not charge for money orders to their clients. Money orders are trusted financial instruments and are considered to be certified funds by the IRS and other Federal Agencies. However, just because a particular business can issue a money order does not necessarily mean that they will cash them. The United States Postal Service (USPS) issues money orders for a small charge at any location, but they are only negotiable within the US and its possessions; after September 2024 the USPS stopped issuing international postal money orders.

The USPS began selling money orders as an alternative to sending currency through the postal system in order to reduce post office robberies, an idea instituted by Montgomery Blair who was Postmaster-General 1861–1864. Money orders were later offered by many more vendors than just the postal service as a means to pay bills and send money internationally where there were not reliable banking or postal systems. Companies that now offer money orders include 7-Eleven, QuikTrip, Cumberland Farms, Safeway, Western Union, MoneyGram, CVS, and Walmart.

== International ==
An international money order is very similar in many aspects to a regular money order except that it can be used to make payments abroad. With it, a buyer can easily pay a seller for goods or services if they reside in another country. International money orders are often issued by a buyer's bank and bought in the currency that the seller accepts. International money orders are thought to be safer than sending currency through the post because there are various forms of identification required to cash an international money order, often including a signature and a form of photo identification.

When purchasing an international money order, it is important to ensure that the specific type of money order is acceptable in the destination country. Several countries are very strict that the money order be on pink and yellow paper and bear the words "international postal money order". In particular, Japan Post (one of the largest banking institutions in the world) requires these features. Most other countries have taken this as a standard when there is any doubt of a document's authenticity.

Foreign workers often use this method for reliably sending money "home".

== Alternatives ==
In the last decade, a number of electronic alternatives to money orders have emerged and have, in some cases, supplanted money orders as the preferred cash transmission method. Many of these alternatives use the ubiquitous Visa/MasterCard payment systems to settle transactions. In Japan, the konbini system enables cash to cash transfers and is available at many of the thousands of convenience stores located in the country. In Italy, the PostePay system is offered through the Italian post office. In Ireland, 3V is offered through mobile top-up locations. In the United States, PaidByCash is offered at 60,000 grocery and convenience stores. In Bangladesh, mobile banking services enable electronic transfer of money as well as retail transactions. In the United Kingdom, a number of credit card providers have started to provide pre-paid credit cards. These cards can be "topped-up" at any location that uses the Pay-Point system and also at the Post Office for the Post Office card. PayPal has their own branded pre-paid card which can be "topped-up" using a PayPal account or Pay-Points.

== See also ==
- Postal orders – similar instruments mainly in British Commonwealth countries
- United States postal notes – a payment system developed out of fractional currency
