= Banker's draft =

Payment method

A banker's draft (also called a bank cheque, bank draft in Canada or, in the US, a teller's check) is a cheque provided to a customer of a bank or acquired from a bank for remittance purposes, that is drawn by the bank, and drawn on another bank or payable through or at a bank. In Canada, the term "bank draft" includes both this kind of check and, in practice almost always, the instrument known elsewhere as a cashier's check.

A normal cheque represents an instruction to transfer a sum of money from the drawer's account to the payee's account. When the payee deposits the cheque into their account, the cheque is verified as genuine (or 'cleared', a process typically taking several days) and the transfer is performed (usually via a clearing house or similar system). Any individual or company's operating a current account (or checking account) has authority to draw cheques against the funds stored in that account.

However, it is impossible to predict when the cheque will be deposited after it is drawn. Because the funds represented by a cheque are not transferred until the cheque is deposited and cleared, it is possible the drawer's account may not have sufficient funds to honour the cheque when the transfer finally occurs. This dishonoured or 'bounced' cheque is now worthless and the payee receives no money, which is why cheques are less secure than cash.

By contrast, when an individual requests a banker's draft the amount of the draft (plus any applicable fees and charges) is immediately removed from their account. (An individual without an account at the issuing bank may request a banker's draft and pay for it in cash, subject to applicable anti-money laundering law and the bank's issuing policies.) Because the funds of a banker's draft have already been debited they are proven to be available. This means that the amount will be honoured unless the draft is a forgery or stolen, or the bank issuing the draft goes out of business before the draft is deposited and cleared. There is a caveat in that the bank protocols may declare the draft too old to be valid; this has been known to happen when the draft is over six years old. Like other types of cheques, a draft must still be cleared and so it will take several days for the funds to become available in the payee's account.

A bank draft is not the same as a cashier's check, except in Canada where the term "bank draft" covers both meanings. A cashier's check is a check that is drawn directly on the bank issuing it, signed by an officer or employee of the bank on behalf of the bank as drawer, and a direct obligation of that bank.

== See also ==
- Bearer bond
