= Cashier's check =

Check from the direct funds of a financial institution

A cashier's check (or cashier's cheque, cashier's order, official check; in Canada, the term bank draft is used, not to be confused with Banker's draft as used in the United States) is a check guaranteed by a bank, drawn on the bank's own funds and signed by a bank employee. Cashier's checks are treated as guaranteed funds because the bank, rather than the purchaser, is both the drawee and drawer and is responsible for paying the amount. They are commonly required for real estate and brokerage transactions.

Genuine cashier's checks deposited into a bank account are usually cleared the next day. The customer can request "next-day availability" when depositing a cashier's check in person, with a special deposit slip.

When cashier's checks took weeks to clear the banks, they were often forged in fraud schemes. The recipient of the check would deposit it in their account and withdraw funds under next-day availability, assuming it was legitimate. The bank might not be informed the check was fraudulent until, perhaps, weeks after the customer had withdrawn funds made available by the fraudulent deposit, by which time the customer would be legally liable for the cash already withdrawn. However, with the introduction of Check 21, this is much less common as checks are cleared within 48 hours.

When a customer asks a bank for a cashier's check, the bank debits the amount from the customer's account immediately, or receives the amount of the check in cash, and assumes the responsibility for covering the cashier's check. That is in contrast with a personal check, for which the bank does not debit the amount from the customer's account until the check is deposited or cashed by the recipient.

A cashier's check is not the same as a teller's check, also known as a banker's draft, which is a check provided to a customer, drawn by the bank (the drawer), and drawn through another bank or payable through or at a bank (the drawee).

A cashier's check is also different from a certified check, which is a personal check written by the customer and drawn on the customer's account, on which the bank certifies that the signature is genuine and that the customer has sufficient funds in the account to cover the check.

Also, a cashier's check should not be confused with a counter check, which is a non-personalized check provided by the bank for the convenience of a customer making withdrawals or payments, but it is not guaranteed and is functionally equivalent to a personal check.

== Characteristics ==
Cashier's checks feature the name of the issuing bank in a prominent location, usually the upper left-hand corner or upper center of the check. In addition, they are generally produced with enhanced security features, including watermarks, security thread, color-shifting ink, and special bond paper. These are designed to decrease the vulnerability to counterfeit items. To be recognized as a cashier's check, words to that effect must be included in a prominent place on the front of the item.

The payee's name, the written and numeric amount to be tendered, the remitter's information, and other tracking information (such as the branch of issue), are printed on the front of the check. The check is generally signed by one or two bank employees or officers; however, some banks issue cashier's checks featuring a facsimile signature of the bank's chief executive officer or other senior official.

Some banks contract out the maintenance of their cashier's check accounts and check issuing. One leading contractor is Integrated Payment Systems, which issues cashier's checks and coordinates redemption of the items for many banks, in addition to issuing money orders and other payment instruments. In theory, checks issued by a financial institution but drawn on another institution, as is often the case with credit unions, are teller's checks.

Due to an increase in fraudulent activities, starting in 2006 many banks have insisted upon waiting for a cashier's check to clear the originating institution before making funds available for withdrawal. Personal checks thus have the same utility in such transactions.

== Legal definition ==
In the United States, under Article 3 of the Uniform Commercial Code, a cashier's check is effective as a note of the issuing bank. Also, according to Regulation CC (Reg CC) of the Federal Reserve, cashier's checks are recognized as "guaranteed funds", and amounts under $5,000 are not subject to deposit hold (except in the case of new accounts). The length of a hold varies (2 days to 2 weeks) depending on the bank. It is not clear what length of time may pass before a bank can be held responsible for accepting a bad cashier's check.

In Canada, bank drafts carry the same legal weight as standard checks but are provided as a service to clients as a payment instrument with guaranteed funds. Drafts (or money orders depending on the issuing institution) usually have better security features than standard checks, and as such are often preferred when the receiver is concerned about receiving fraudulent payment instruments. However, bank drafts can also be subject to counterfeiting, and as such can be held or verified by depositing institutions in accordance with their hold funds policy, prior to providing access to the funds.

In Canada, the term money order is used non-uniformly: some institutions offer both money orders and bank drafts depending on the amount, while others only offer one or the other for any amount. Generally, bank drafts and money orders are treated the same way with respect to guaranteed funds and hold policies.

== Alternatives and risks ==
In many nations, money orders are a popular alternative to cashier's checks and are considered safer than personal bank checks. However, in the United States, they are generally not recognized as "guaranteed funds" under Reg CC.

Because of US regulatory requirements associated with the Patriot Act and the Bank Secrecy Act due to updated concerns over money laundering, most insurance and brokerage firms will no longer accept money orders as payment for insurance premiums or as deposits into brokerage accounts.

Counterfeit money orders and cashier's checks have been used in certain scams to steal from those who sell their goods online on sites such as eBay and Craigslist.

The counterfeit cashier's check scam is a scheme wherein the victim is sent a cashier's check or money order for payment on an item for sale on the Internet. When the money order is taken to the bank it may not be detected as counterfeit for 10 business days or more, but the bank will deposit the money into the account and state that it has been "verified" or is "clear" in about 24 hours. This gives the victim a false sense of security that the money order was real, so they proceed with the transaction. In many cases, the scammer's "check" or "money order" exceeds the item's price, and the scammer asks the victim to refund them the difference in cash. Then, when the bank eventually discovers that the money order is counterfeit and reverses the account credit many days later, the customer will usually have already mailed the item.

== See also ==
- Certified check
- Demand draft
- Money order
- Paymaster Corporation
- Traveler's cheque
