= Full Employment Act =

Full Employment Act may refer to:

- Employment Act of 1946, a United States federal law
- Humphrey–Hawkins Full Employment Act of 1978
