= Mortgage constant =

Capitalization rate for debt; ratio of annual debt service to mortgage principal

The mortgage constant, also called the mortgage capitalization rate or loan constant, is the ratio of the annual debt service on a mortgage loan to the original loan principal. It represents the percentage of the original loan amount that must be paid each year to fully service the debt — covering both interest and principal amortization — over the loan term.

The mortgage constant is commonly denoted R_{m} and is used in real estate appraisal and commercial real estate underwriting as a component of the band of investment method for deriving capitalization rates, and in conjunction with the debt service coverage ratio (DSCR) in commercial mortgage analysis.

== Formula ==
The mortgage constant is derived from the standard annuity formula for a fixed-rate, fully amortizing loan.

=== Monthly mortgage constant ===
$$R_m(\text{monthly}) = \frac{i/m}{1 - \left(1 + i/m\right)^{-n}}$$

=== Annualized mortgage constant ===
$$R_m(\text{annual}) = \frac{i/m}{1 - \left(1 + i/m\right)^{-n}} \times 12$$

Where:

- $i$ = annual interest rate (expressed as a decimal)
- $m$ = number of payment periods per year (12 for monthly payments)
- $n$ = total number of monthly payments over the loan term

The annualized mortgage constant can equivalently be expressed as:

$$R_m = \frac{\text{Annual Debt Service}}{\text{Original Loan Principal}}$$

=== Microsoft Excel implementation ===
For a 30-year loan at 5.5% annual interest, the annualized mortgage constant is computed as:

(0.055/12) / (1 - (1 / POWER(1 + (0.055/12), 360))) * 12

This returns approximately 0.0681 — meaning 6.81% of the original principal must be paid annually to fully amortize the loan over 30 years at 5.5% interest.

== Relationship to interest rate ==
The mortgage constant and the interest rate are related but distinct:

- For a fully amortizing loan, the mortgage constant is always higher than the interest rate, because the constant incorporates both interest payments and principal repayment.
- For a negatively amortizing loan — where scheduled payments are insufficient to cover interest and the outstanding balance grows — the mortgage constant may be lower than the interest rate.
- For an interest-only loan, the mortgage constant equals the interest rate exactly, since no principal amortization is included in the payment.

Loan Type	R_{m} vs. Interest Rate
Fully amortizing	R_{m} > interest rate
Interest-only	R_{m} = interest rate
Negatively amortizing	R_{m} < interest rate

== Effect of loan term and interest rate ==
The mortgage constant increases as the interest rate rises and decreases as the loan term lengthens. For a given interest rate, a shorter loan term produces a higher mortgage constant because the principal must be repaid over fewer periods.

Interest Rate	15-Year Term	20-Year Term	30-Year Term
4.00%	0.0888	0.0727	0.0573
5.50%	0.0981	0.0825	0.0681
7.00%	0.1079	0.0931	0.0799

Values are annualized mortgage constants (R_{m}) for a fully amortizing fixed-rate loan.

== Applications ==
=== Band of investment method ===
In real estate appraisal, the band of investment method derives an overall capitalization rate (R_{o}) by weighting the mortgage constant and the equity capitalization rate (R_{e}) according to the loan-to-value ratio (LTV) of the financing:

$$R_o = (LTV \times R_m) + ((1 - LTV) \times R_e)$$

Example: A property is financed with a 70% LTV loan at a mortgage constant of 0.0681 and the equity investor requires an equity capitalization rate of 0.10:

$$R_o = (0.70 \times 0.0681) + (0.30 \times 0.10) = 0.0477 + 0.0300 = 0.0777$$

The indicated overall capitalization rate is 7.77%. This method is widely used by appraisers to derive market-supported capitalization rates when comparable sales data is limited.

=== Debt service coverage ratio ===
Commercial bankers and underwriters use the mortgage constant in conjunction with the debt service coverage ratio (DSCR) to assess a property's ability to service its debt from operating income:

$$DSCR = \frac{NOI}{Annual\ Debt\ Service} = \frac{NOI}{Loan\ Principal \times R_m}$$

A DSCR of 1.25 is a common minimum threshold in commercial real estate lending, meaning the property's net operating income must be at least 125% of the annual debt service. The mortgage constant provides the link between the loan amount and the required annual income to satisfy a given DSCR requirement.

=== Maximum loan sizing ===
Lenders use the mortgage constant to determine the maximum loan amount supportable by a property's net operating income (NOI) at a required DSCR:

$$\text{Max Loan} = \frac{NOI}{DSCR \times R_m}$$

Example: A property generates $100,000 in NOI. The lender requires a 1.25 DSCR, and the mortgage constant at the quoted rate and term is 0.0681:

$$\text{Max Loan} = \frac{\$100{,}000}{1.25 \times 0.0681} = \frac{\$100{,}000}{0.0851} \approx \$1{,}175{,}000$$

== Limitations ==
The mortgage constant assumes a fixed interest rate and a fully amortizing payment structure. It does not apply directly to:

- Adjustable-rate mortgages (ARMs), where the constant changes as the rate adjusts
- Balloon loans, where a large principal payment is due at maturity before full amortization
- Loans with interest-only periods followed by amortization, where the constant changes at the transition point

For these structures, an effective or blended mortgage constant must be calculated separately for each payment phase.

== See also ==
- Capitalization rate
- Band of investment
- Debt service coverage ratio
- Loan-to-value ratio
- Net operating income
- Amortization (mortgage)
- Real estate appraisal
- Interest rate
