= Federal Reserve Reform Act of 1977 =

U.S law regulating the Federal Reserve

- Long title: An Act to extend the authority for the flexible regulation of interest rates on deposits and accounts in depository institutions, to promote the accountability of the Federal Reserve System, and for other purposes.
- Enacted by: the 95th United States Congress
- Effective: November 16, 1977

Citations
- Public law: Pub. L. 95–188
- Statutes at Large: 91 Stat. 1387

Codification
- Acts amended: Federal Reserve Act Bank Holding Company Act of 1956

Legislative history
- Introduced in the House as H.R. 9710 by Henry S. Reuss (D–WI) on October 20, 1977; Passed the House on October 31, 1977 (395–3); Passed the Senate on November 1, 1977 with amendment; House agreed to Senate amendment on November 2, 1977 (); Signed into law by President Jimmy Carter on November 16, 1977

The Federal Reserve Reform Act of 1977 enacted a number of reforms to the Federal Reserve, making it more accountable for its actions on monetary and fiscal policy and tasking it with the goal to "promote maximum employment, production, and price stability". The act explicitly established price stability as a national policy goal for the first time. It also required quarterly reports to Congress "concerning the ranges of monetary and credit aggregates for the upcoming 12 months." It also modified the selection of the Class B and C Reserve Bank Directors. Discrimination on the basis of race, creed, color, sex, or national origin was prohibited, and the composition of the directors was required to represent interests of "agriculture, commerce, industry, services, labor and consumers". The Federal Reserve Act, which created the Federal Reserve in 1913, made no mention of services, labor, and consumers. Finally, the act established Senate confirmation of chairmen and vice chairmen of the Board of Governors of the Federal Reserve. The Federal Reserve Reform Act made the Federal Reserve more transparent to Congressional oversight.

== Historical context and objectives ==
Much of the text of the Federal Reserve Reform Act pertains to Congress leveraging its oversight power over the Federal Reserve to make it disclose its monetary objectives. Since Congressional Resolution 133 was passed in 1975, the Federal Open Market Committee had announced the long-term monetary aggregates of M1, M2, and M3. This policy was codified in the Federal Reserve Reform Act. Congress enacted this policy under the belief that the actions of the Federal Reserve directly impacted the business climate, and it wanted to keep track of the Federal Reserve's attempts to alter it. Leaders at the Federal Reserve who objected were not necessarily motivated by a desire for secrecy. Rather, they felt that disclosing the Fed's views made their plans more difficult to realize in the future, because markets would respond to the Fed's plans and alter the Fed's projections. In other words, certain market actors would use the Fed's disclosures to engage in profitable investments, which would alter market outcomes and neutralize the Federal Reserve's actions. Furthermore, the Federal Reserve argued that this benefit would accrue to a few individuals, which would not be in the public interest. This was the reason that the Fed regularly overshot targets for money growth until the Volcker years.

The Federal Reserve Reform Act of 1977 was passed in short succession with a number of other bills regulating the Federal Reserve. Namely:

- Congressional Resolution 133 on March 25, 1975
- Full Employment and Balanced Growth Act of 1978
- Government in the Sunshine Act, effective on March 12, 1977

== Outline of the Reform Act ==
The Federal Reserve Reform Act of 1977 is composed of three titles:

- Title I: Regulation of Interest Rates
  - Extends the authority of the Board of Governors of the Federal Reserve System to regulate interest rates on deposits and accounts in insured institutions by one year until December 15, 1978.
- Title II: Amendments to the Federal Reserve Act
  - Amends the Federal Reserve Act to require the Board of Governors of the Federal Reserve System and the Federal Open Market Committee to maintain the long-run growth of the monetary and credit aggregates commensurate with the economy's production potential.
  - Prohibits discrimination in the selection of the Board of Directors of the Federal Reserve System.
  - Requires Senate confirmation of the Chairman and Vice Chairman of the Board of Governors, effective in 1979. States that such officers will have four-year terms.
  - Makes it a criminal offense for a Federal Reserve Bank officer, employee, or director to participate in specified activities affecting personal financial interests.
- Title III: Amendments to the Bank Holding Company Act of 1956
  - Amends the Bank Holding Company Act of 1956 to authorize the Board of Governors of the Federal Reserve System upon application of a bank holding company to extend the two-year period during which a company may dispose of shares acquired in the course of securing or collecting a debt.
  - Permits the waiver of the 30-day notice requirement for acquisitions of banks by holding companies and the immediate consummation of such transaction when the transaction would facilitate the acquisition of a failing bank.
