= Federal Reserve =

Central banking system of the US

Federal Reserve System
- Seal of the Federal Reserve System

- Flag of the Federal Reserve System

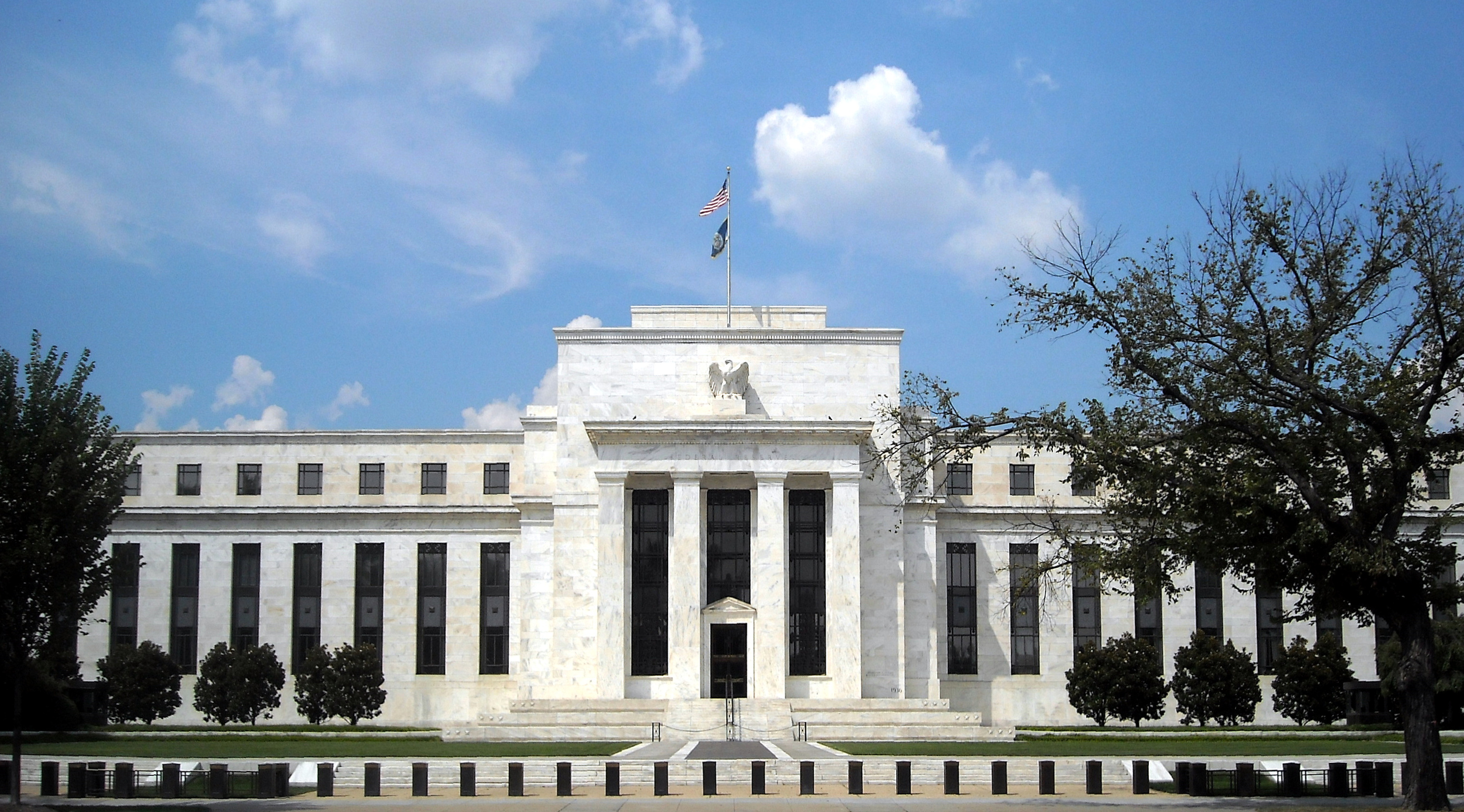
- The Eccles Building in Washington, D.C., which serves as the Federal Reserve System's headquarters
- Central bank of: United States
- Headquarters: Eccles Building, Washington, D.C., U.S.
- Established: December 23, 1913 (112 years ago)
- Governing body: Board of Governors
- Key people: Kevin Warsh (Chair); Philip Jefferson (Vice Chair); Michelle Bowman (Vice Chair for Supervision)
- Currency: United States dollar USD (ISO 4217)
- Reserve requirements: None
- Bank rate: 3.75%
- Interest rate target: 3.50–3.75%
- Interest on reserves: 3.65%
- Interest paid on excess reserves?: Yes
- Website: www.federalreserve.gov
- Federal Reserve

Agency overview
- Jurisdiction: Federal government of the United States
- Child agency: Federal Open Market Committee
- Key document: Federal Reserve Act

The Federal Reserve System (often shortened to the Federal Reserve, or simply the Fed) is the central banking system of the United States. It was created on December 23, 1913, with the enactment of the Federal Reserve Act, after a series of financial panics led to the desire for central control of the American monetary system. Although an instrument of the U.S. government, the Federal Reserve System is considered an independent central bank due to its structural insulation from political interference. Over the years, events such as the Great Depression in the 1930s and the Great Recession during the 2000s have led to the expansion of central bank's remit.

Congress established three key objectives for monetary policy in the Federal Reserve Act: maximizing employment, stabilizing prices, and moderating long-term interest rates. The first two objectives are sometimes referred to as the Federal Reserve's dual mandate. Its duties have expanded over the years, and include supervising and regulating banks, maintaining the stability of the financial system, and providing financial services to depository institutions, the U.S. government, and foreign official institutions. The Fed also conducts research into the economy and provides numerous publications, such as the Beige Book and the FRED database.

The Federal Reserve System is composed of several layers. It is governed by the presidentially appointed board of governors or Federal Reserve Board (FRB). Twelve regional Federal Reserve Banks, located in cities throughout the nation, regulate and oversee privately owned commercial banks. The Federal Open Market Committee (FOMC) sets monetary policy by adjusting the target for the federal funds rate, which generally influences market interest rates and, in turn, the American economy via the monetary transmission mechanism.

The Federal Reserve has been criticized for its approach to managing inflation, perceived lack of transparency, and its role in economic downturns.

== Purpose ==
Before the founding of the Federal Reserve System, the United States underwent several financial crises. A particularly severe crisis in 1907 led Congress to enact the Federal Reserve Act in 1913. The primary declared motivation for creating the Federal Reserve System was to address banking panics. Other stated purposes, are "to furnish an elastic currency, to afford means of rediscounting commercial paper, [and] to establish a more effective supervision of banking in the United States".

Today, the purposes of the Federal Reserve include the responsibilities to:

- Address the problem of banking panics
- Serve as the central bank for the United States
- Balance private interests of banks and the centralized responsibility of government
  - Supervise and regulate banking institutions
  - Protect the credit rights of consumers
- Conduct monetary policy by influencing market interest rates to achieve the goals of
  - Maximum employment
  - Stable prices, interpreted as an inflation rate of 2 percent per year on average
  - Moderate long-term interest rates
- Maintain the stability of the financial system and contain systemic risk in financial markets
- Provide financial services to depository institutions, the U.S. government, and foreign official institutions
  - Facilitate the exchange of payments among regions and the operation of the nation's payments system
  - Respond to local liquidity needs
- Strengthen U.S. standing in the world economy

=== Fractional-reserve bank ===
Banks usually invest the majority of the funds received from depositors. However, banking institutions in the United States are required to hold reserves‍—‌amounts of currency and deposits in other banks‍—‌equal to a fraction of the amount of the bank's deposit liabilities owed to customers. This practice is called fractional-reserve banking. On rare occasions, too many of the bank's customers will withdraw their savings such that the bank cannot continue operating on its own; this is called a bank run. Bank runs can lead to a multitude of social and economic problems. The Federal Reserve System was designed as an attempt to prevent or minimize the occurrence of bank runs, and possibly act as a lender of last resort when a bank run occurs. Many economists, following Nobel laureate Milton Friedman, believe that the Federal Reserve inappropriately refused to lend money to small banks during the bank runs of 1929; Friedman argued that this contributed to the Great Depression.

==== Check clearing system ====
Before the establishment of the Federal Reserve, during times of economic uncertainty, some banks refused to clear checks from certain other banks, which led to large-scale bank failure in the early 20th-century. Hence, a national check-clearing system was created in the Federal Reserve System. The Federal Reserve can physically accept and transport checks.

==== Lender of last resort ====
In the United States of America, the Federal Reserve serves as the lender of last resort to those institutions that cannot obtain credit elsewhere, institutions the collapse of which would have serious implications for the economy. It took over this role from the private sector clearing houses which operated during the Free Banking Era. The availability of liquidity is intended to prevent bank runs.

==== Fluctuations ====
Reserve Banks provide liquidity to banks to meet short-term needs stemming from seasonal fluctuations in deposits or unexpected withdrawals through its discount window and credit operations. Longer-term liquidity may also be provided in exceptional circumstances. The rate the Fed charges banks for these loans is called the discount rate (officially the primary credit rate). By making these loans, the Fed serves as a buffer against unexpected day-to-day fluctuations in reserve demand and supply. This contributes to the effective functioning of the banking system, alleviates pressure in the reserves market, and reduces the extent of unexpected movements in the interest rates. For example, on September 16, 2008, the Federal Reserve Board authorized an $85 billion loan to stave off the bankruptcy of international insurance giant American International Group (AIG).

=== Central bank ===
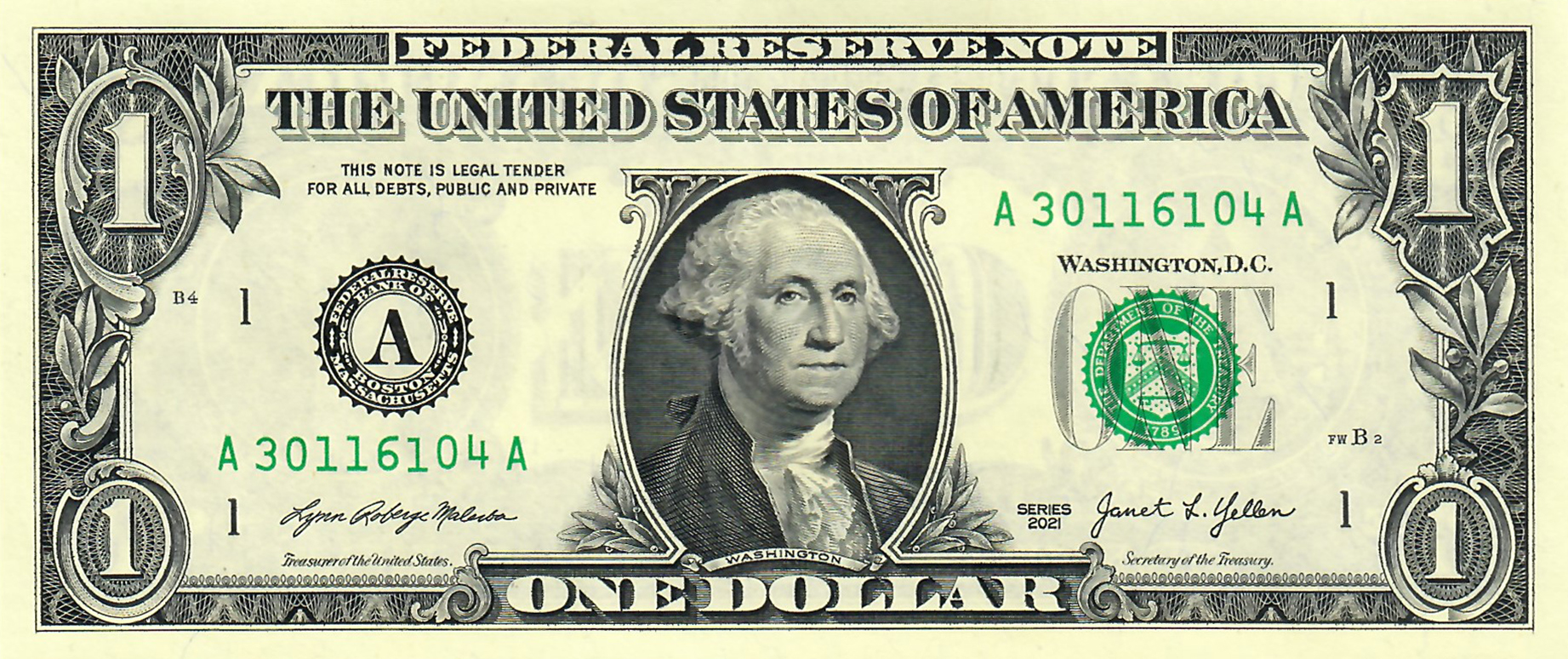
Obverse of a Federal Reserve $1 note issued in 2021

As the central bank of the United States, the Fed serves as a banker's bank and as the government's bank. As the banker's bank, it helps to assure the safety and efficiency of the payments system. As the government's bank or fiscal agent, the Fed processes a variety of financial transactions involving trillions of dollars. The U.S. Treasury keeps a checking account with the Federal Reserve, through which incoming federal tax deposits and outgoing government payments are handled. As part of this service relationship, the Fed sells and redeems U.S. government securities such as savings bonds and Treasury bills, notes and bonds. It also issues the nation's coin and paper currency. The U.S. Treasury, through its Bureau of the Mint and Bureau of Engraving and Printing, actually produces the nation's cash supply and, in effect, sells the paper currency to the Federal Reserve Banks at manufacturing cost, and the coins at face value. The Federal Reserve Banks then distribute it to other financial institutions in various ways. During the Fiscal Year 2020, the Bureau of Engraving and Printing delivered 57.95 billion notes at an average cost of 7.4 cents per note.

==== Federal funds ====
Federal funds, officially Federal Reserve Deposits, are the reserve balances that private banks keep at their local Federal Reserve Bank. These balances are the namesake reserves of the Federal Reserve System. The purpose of keeping funds at a Federal Reserve Bank is to have a mechanism for private banks to lend funds to one another. This market for funds plays an important role in the Federal Reserve System as it is the basis for its monetary policy work. Monetary policy is put into effect partly by influencing how much interest the private banks charge each other for the lending of these funds. Federal reserve accounts contain federal reserve credit, which can be converted into federal reserve notes.

=== Bank regulator ===
The Federal Reserve regulates private banks. The system was designed out of a compromise between the competing philosophies of privatization and government regulation. In 2006 Donald L. Kohn, vice chairman of the board of governors, summarized the history of this compromise:

Agrarian and progressive interests, led by William Jennings Bryan, favored a central bank under public, rather than banker, control. However, the vast majority of the nation's bankers, concerned about government intervention in the banking business, opposed a central bank structure directed by political appointees. The legislation that Congress ultimately adopted in 1913 reflected a hard-fought battle to balance these two competing views and created the hybrid public-private, centralized-decentralized structure that we have today.

In the structure of the Federal Reserve System, private banks elect members of the board of directors at their regional Federal Reserve Bank while the members of the board of governors are selected by the president of the United States and confirmed by the United States Senate.

==== Government regulation and supervision ====
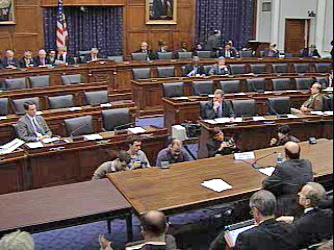
Ben Bernanke (lower right), former chairman of the Federal Reserve Board of Governors, at a House Financial Services Committee hearing on February 10, 2009. Members of the board frequently testify before congressional committees such as this one. The Senate equivalent of the House Financial Services Committee is the Senate Committee on Banking, Housing, and Urban Affairs.

The Board of Governors of the Federal Reserve System has a number of supervisory and regulatory responsibilities in the U.S. banking system, but not complete responsibility. A general description of the types of regulation and supervision involved in the U.S. banking system is given by the Federal Reserve:

The Board also plays a major role in the supervision and regulation of the U.S. banking system. It has supervisory responsibilities for state-chartered banks that are members of the Federal Reserve System, bank holding companies (companies that control banks), the foreign activities of member banks, the U.S. activities of foreign banks, and Edge Act and "agreement corporations" (limited-purpose institutions that engage in a foreign banking business). The Board and, under delegated authority, the Federal Reserve Banks, supervise approximately 900 state member banks and 5,000 bank holding companies. Other federal agencies also serve as the primary federal supervisors of commercial banks; the Office of the Comptroller of the Currency supervises national banks, and the Federal Deposit Insurance Corporation supervises state banks that are not members of the Federal Reserve System.

Some regulations issued by the Board apply to the entire banking industry, whereas others apply only to member banks, that is, state banks that have chosen to join the Federal Reserve System and national banks, which by law must be members of the System. The Board also issues regulations to carry out major federal laws governing consumer credit protection, such as the Truth in Lending, Equal Credit Opportunity, and Home Mortgage Disclosure Acts. Many of these consumer protection regulations apply to various lenders outside the banking industry as well as to banks.

Members of the Board of Governors are in continual contact with other policy makers in government. They frequently testify before congressional committees on the economy, monetary policy, banking supervision and regulation, consumer credit protection, financial markets, and other matters.

The Board has regular contact with members of the President's Council of Economic Advisers and other key economic officials. The Chair also meets from time to time with the President of the United States and has regular meetings with the Secretary of the Treasury. The Chair has formal responsibilities in the international arena as well.

The Federal Banking Agency Audit Act, enacted in 1978 as Public Law 95-320 and 31 U.S.C. section 714 establish that the board of governors of the Federal Reserve System and the Federal Reserve banks may be audited by the Government Accountability Office (GAO). The GAO has authority to audit check-processing, currency storage and shipments, and some regulatory and bank examination functions – though there are restrictions to what the GAO may audit.

==== Regulatory and oversight responsibilities ====
The board of directors of each Federal Reserve Bank District also has regulatory and supervisory responsibilities. If the board of directors of a district bank has judged that a member bank is performing or behaving poorly, it will report this to the board of governors. This policy is described in law:

Each Federal reserve bank shall keep itself informed of the general character and amount of the loans and investments of its member banks with a view to ascertaining whether undue use is being made of bank credit for the speculative carrying of or trading in securities, real estate, or commodities, or for any other purpose inconsistent with the maintenance of sound credit conditions; and, in determining whether to grant or refuse advances, rediscounts, or other credit accommodations, the Federal reserve bank shall give consideration to such information. The chairman of the Federal reserve bank shall report to the Board of Governors of the Federal Reserve System any such undue use of bank credit by any member bank, together with his recommendation. Whenever, in the judgment of the Board of Governors of the Federal Reserve System, any member bank is making such undue use of bank credit, the Board may, in its discretion, after reasonable notice and an opportunity for a hearing, suspend such bank from the use of the credit facilities of the Federal Reserve System and may terminate such suspension or may renew it from time to time.

=== National payments system ===
In the Depository Institutions Deregulation and Monetary Control Act of 1980, Congress reaffirmed that the Federal Reserve should promote an efficient nationwide payments system. The act subjects all depository institutions, not just member commercial banks, to reserve requirements and grants them equal access to Reserve Bank payment services. The twelve Federal Reserve Banks provide banking services to depository institutions and to the federal government. For depository institutions, they maintain accounts and provide various payment services, including collecting checks, electronically transferring funds, and distributing and receiving currency and coin. For the federal government, the Reserve Banks act as fiscal agents, paying Treasury checks; processing electronic payments; and issuing, transferring, and redeeming U.S. government securities.

The Federal Reserve plays a role in the nation's retail and wholesale payments systems by providing financial services to depository institutions. Retail payments are generally for relatively small-dollar amounts and often involve a depository institution's retail clients. The Reserve Banks' retail banking services include distributing currency and coin, collecting checks, electronically transferring funds through FedACH (the Federal Reserve's automated clearing house system), and beginning in 2023, facilitating instant payments using the FedNow service. The Reserve Banks' wholesale banking services include electronically transferring funds through the Fedwire Funds Service and transferring securities issued by the U.S. government, its agencies, and certain other entities through the Fedwire Securities Service. Unlike retail services, wholesale payments are generally for large-dollar amounts and often involve a depository institution's large corporate customers or counterparties.

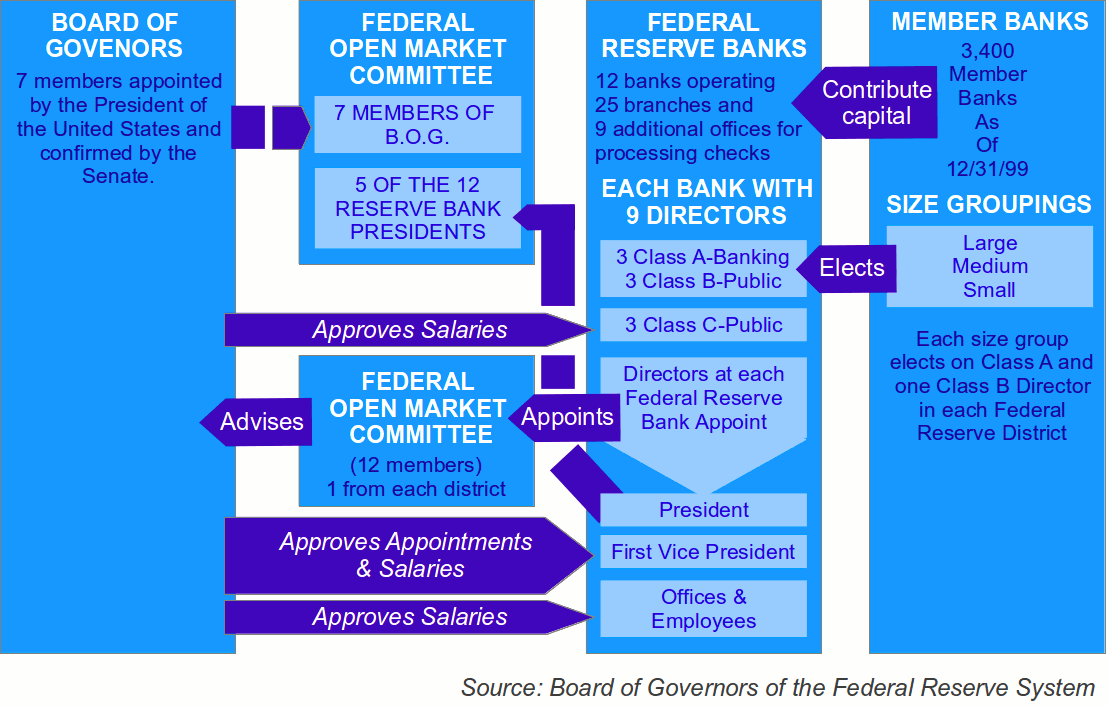
Organization of the Federal Reserve System

== Structure ==
The Federal Reserve System has a "unique structure that is both public and private" and is described as "independent within the government" rather than "independent of government". The System does not draw upon public funding, and derives its authority and purpose from the Federal Reserve Act, which was passed by Congress in 1913 and is subject to Congressional modification or repeal. The four main components of the Federal Reserve System are the board of governors, the Federal Open Market Committee, the twelve regional Federal Reserve Banks, and the member banks throughout the country.

List of Federal Reserve Banks by district number/letter
Number	Letter	Federal Reserve Bank	Branches	Website	President
1	A	Boston		www.bostonfed.org	Susan M. Collins
2	B	New York City		www.newyorkfed.org	John C. Williams
3	C	Philadelphia		www.philadelphiafed.org	Anna Paulson
4	D	Cleveland	Cincinnati, Ohio; Pittsburgh, Pennsylvania	www.clevelandfed.org	Beth M. Hammack
5	E	Richmond	Baltimore, Maryland; Charlotte, North Carolina	www.richmondfed.org	Thomas Barkin
6	F	Atlanta	Birmingham, Alabama; Jacksonville, Florida; Miami, Florida; Nashville, Tennessee; New Orleans, Louisiana	www.atlantafed.org	Cheryl Venable (interim)
7	G	Chicago	Detroit, Michigan	www.chicagofed.org	Austan Goolsbee
8	H	St. Louis	Little Rock, Arkansas; Louisville, Kentucky; Memphis, Tennessee	www.stlouisfed.org	James B. Bullard
9	I	Minneapolis	Helena, Montana	www.minneapolisfed.org	Neel Kashkari
10	J	Kansas City	Denver, Colorado; Oklahoma City, Oklahoma; Omaha, Nebraska	www.kansascityfed.org	Jeffrey Schmid
11	K	Dallas	El Paso, Texas; Houston, Texas; San Antonio, Texas	www.dallasfed.org	Lorie K. Logan
12	L	San Francisco	Los Angeles, California; Portland, Oregon; Salt Lake City, Utah; Seattle, Washington	www.frbsf.org	Mary C. Daly

=== Board of governors ===
The seven-member board of governors is a large federal agency that functions in business oversight by examining national banks. It is charged with the overseeing of the 12 District Reserve Banks and setting national monetary policy. It also supervises and regulates the U.S. banking system in general. Governors are appointed by the president of the United States and confirmed by the Senate for staggered 14-year terms. One term begins every two years, on February 1 of even-numbered years, and members serving a full term cannot be renominated for a second term. "[U]pon the expiration of their terms of office, members of the Board shall continue to serve until their successors are appointed and have qualified." The law provides for the removal of a member of the board by the president of the United States "for cause". The board is required to make an annual report of operations to the Speaker of the U.S. House of Representatives.

The chair and vice chair of the board of governors are appointed by the president of the United States from among the sitting governors. They both serve a four-year term and they can be renominated as many times as the president chooses, until their terms on the board of governors expire.

On May 13, 2026, the United States Senate confirmed Kevin Warsh in a 54–45 vote to succeed Powell as the 17th chair of the Federal Reserve, with Powell's term expiring on May 15, 2026.

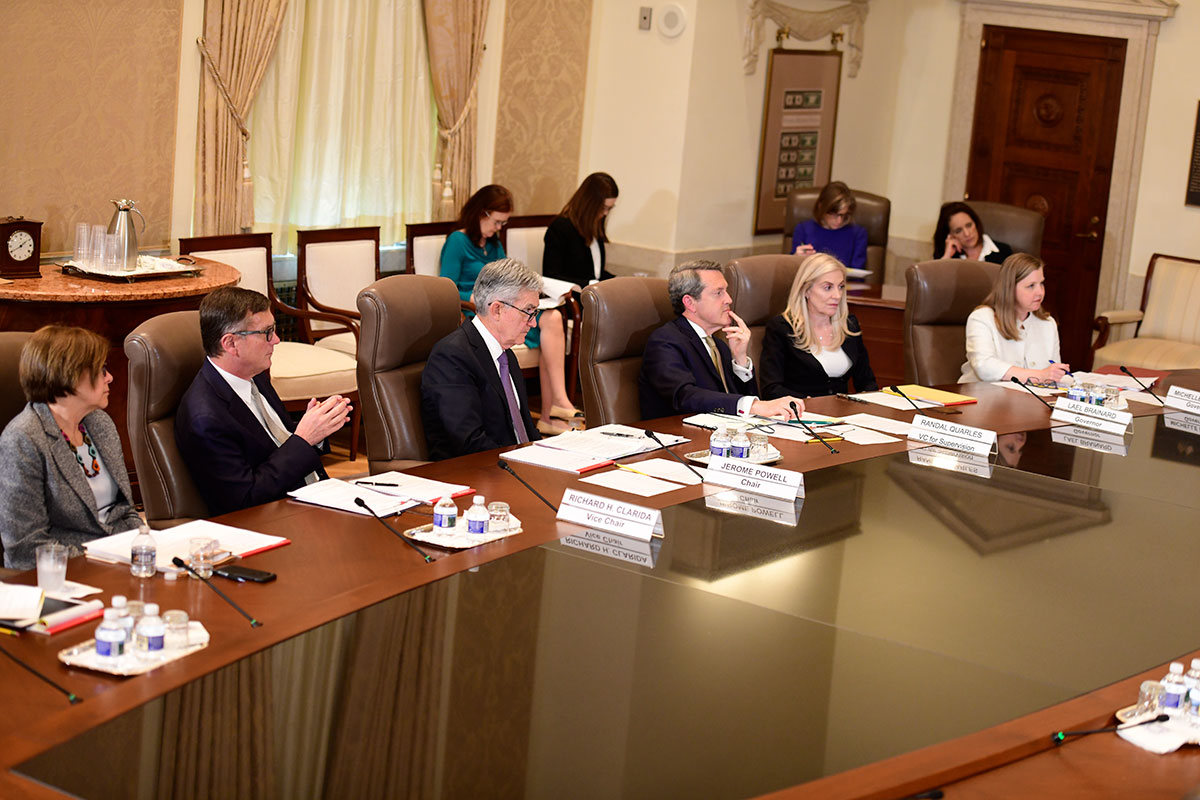
Board of governors in April 2019, when two of the seven seats were vacant

The current members of the board of governors are:

List of members of the board of governors
Portrait	Name	Party	Start	Term expires
	Kevin Warsh (chair)	Republican	May 22, 2026 (as chair)	May 21, 2030 (as chair)
	Kevin Warsh (chair)	Republican	May 22, 2026 (as governor)	January 31, 2040 (as governor)
	Philip Jefferson (vice chair)	Democratic	September 13, 2023 (as vice chair)	September 7, 2027 (as vice chair)
	Philip Jefferson (vice chair)	Democratic	May 23, 2022 (as governor)	January 31, 2036 (as governor)
	Michelle Bowman (vice chair for supervision)	Republican	June 9, 2025 (as vice chair)	June 9, 2029 (as vice chair)
	Michelle Bowman (vice chair for supervision)	Republican	November 26, 2018 (as governor); February 1, 2020 (reappointment)	January 31, 2034 (as governor)
	Jerome Powell	Republican	May 25, 2012; June 16, 2014 (reappointment)	January 31, 2028
	Christopher Waller	Republican	December 18, 2020	January 31, 2030
	Lisa Cook	Democratic	May 23, 2022; February 1, 2024 (reappointment)	January 31, 2038
	Michael Barr	Democratic	July 19, 2022	January 31, 2032

=== Federal Open Market Committee ===
The Federal Open Market Committee (FOMC) consists of 12 members, seven from the board of governors and five from the regional Federal Reserve Bank presidents, and must obtain consensus on all decisions. The FOMC oversees and sets policy on open market operations, the principal tool of national monetary policy. The FOMC also directs operations undertaken by the Federal Reserve in foreign exchange markets. All Regional Reserve Bank presidents contribute to the committee's assessment of the economy and of policy options, but only the five presidents who are then members of the FOMC vote on policy decisions. The FOMC determines its own internal organization and, by tradition, elects the chair of the board of governors as its chair and the president of the Federal Reserve Bank of New York as its vice chair. Formal meetings typically are held eight times each year in Washington, D.C.

There is very strong consensus among economists against politicising the FOMC.

=== Federal Advisory Council ===
The Federal Advisory Council (FAC) is a statutory body established under the Federal Reserve Act of 1913 to provide the Board of Governors of the Federal Reserve System with insights and recommendations from the banking industry and regional economic perspectives. Comprising one representative from each of the 12 Federal Reserve Districts, the Council meets at least four times annually in Washington, D.C. to discuss economic and banking issues and offer advisory opinions to the Board. Each Federal Reserve Bank’s board of directors selects its district’s representative, typically a senior executive from a member bank, ensuring diverse geographic and institutional input.

=== Federal Reserve Banks ===
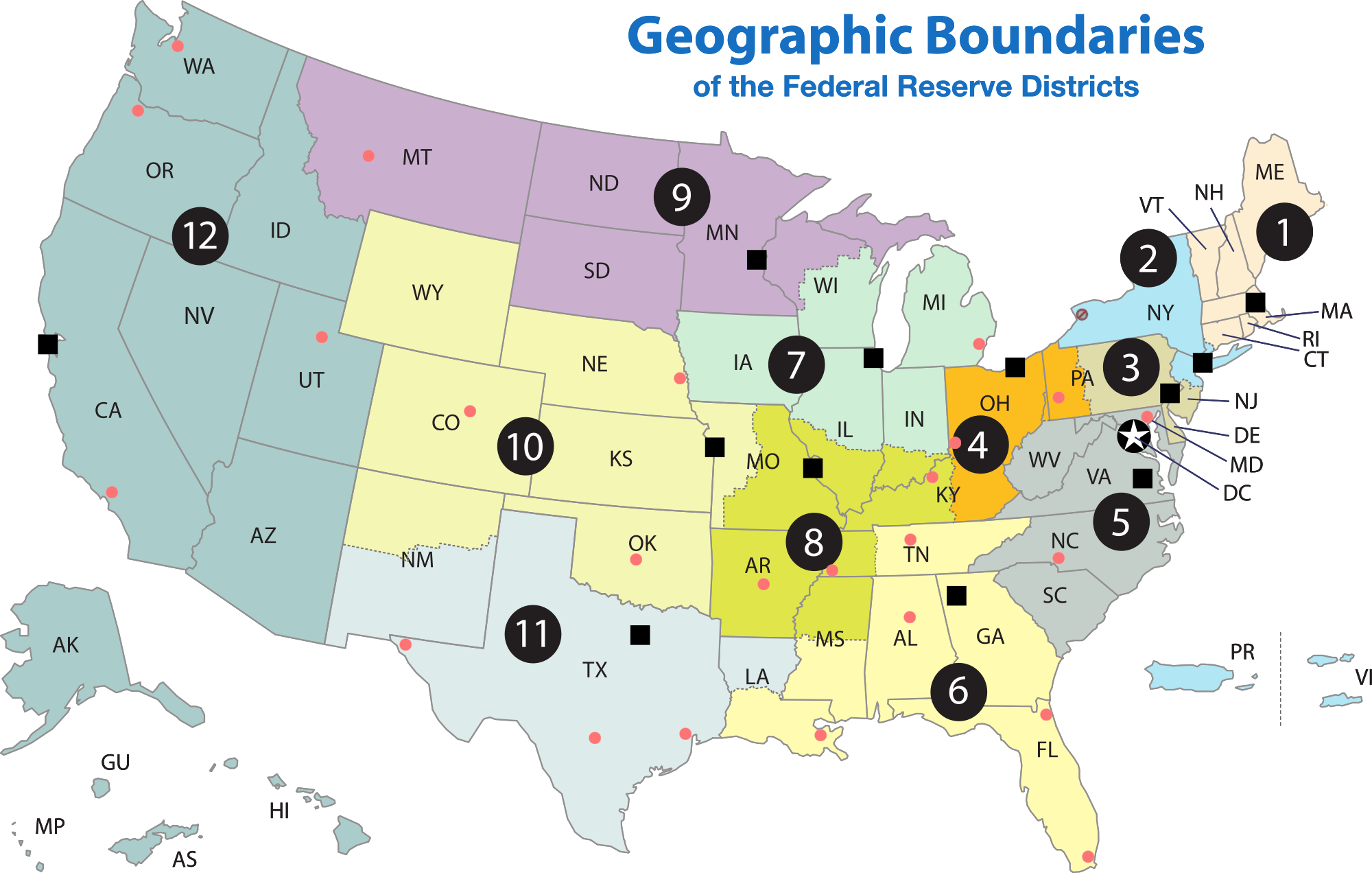
Map of the 12 Federal Reserve Districts, with the 12 Federal Reserve Banks marked as black squares, and all Branches within each district (24 total) marked as red circles. The Washington, DC, headquarters is marked with a star. (Also, a 25th branch in Buffalo, NY, was closed in 2008.)

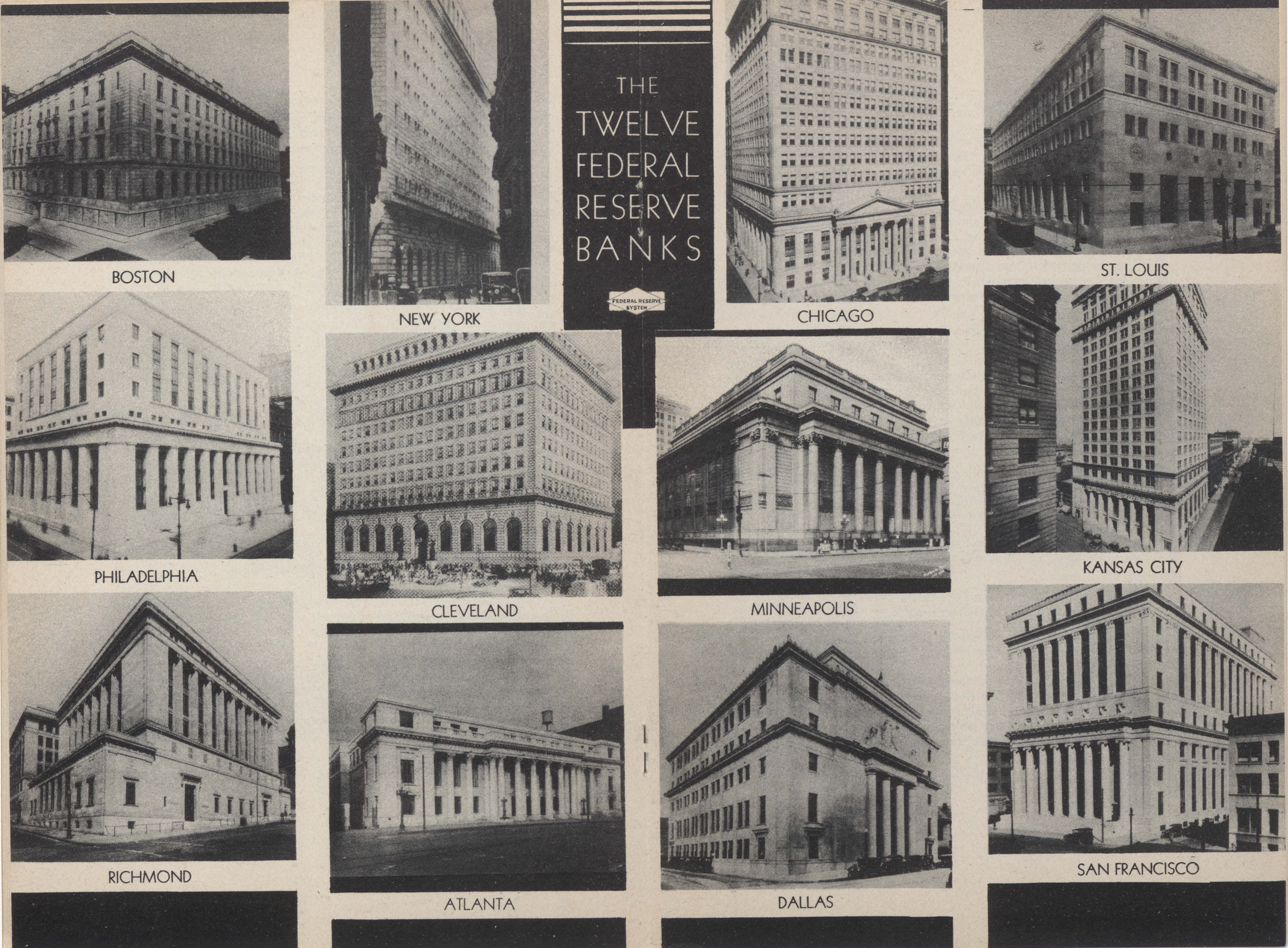
The 12 Reserve Banks buildings in 1936

There are 12 Federal Reserve Banks, each of which is responsible for member banks located in its district. They are located in Boston, New York, Philadelphia, Cleveland, Richmond, Atlanta, Chicago, St. Louis, Minneapolis, Kansas City, Dallas, and San Francisco. The size of each district was set based upon the population distribution of the United States when the Federal Reserve Act was passed. The charter and organization of each bank is established by law and cannot be altered by the member banks. Each regional bank has a president, who is the chief executive officer of their bank. Each president is nominated by their bank's board of directors, but the nomination is contingent upon approval by the board of governors. Presidents serve five-year terms and may be reappointed.

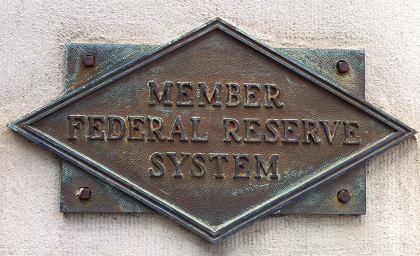
Plaque marking a bank as a member

=== Member banks ===
A member bank is a private institution and owns stock in its regional Federal Reserve Bank. All nationally chartered banks hold stock in one of the Federal Reserve Banks. State chartered banks may choose to be members (and hold stock in their regional Federal Reserve bank) upon meeting certain standards. The amount of stock a member bank must own is equal to 3% of its combined capital and surplus. About 38% of U.S. banks are members of their regional Federal Reserve Bank.

Holding stock in a Federal Reserve bank is not like owning stock in a publicly traded company. These stocks cannot be sold or traded, and member banks do not control the Federal Reserve Bank as a result of owning this stock. From their Regional Bank, member banks with $10 billion or less in assets receive a dividend of 6%, while member banks with more than $10 billion in assets receive the lesser of 6% or the current 10-year Treasury auction rate. The remainder of the regional Federal Reserve Banks' profits is given over to the United States Treasury Department. In 2015, the Federal Reserve Banks made a profit of $100.2 billion and distributed $2.5 billion in dividends to member banks as well as returning $97.7 billion to the U.S. Treasury.

=== Accountability ===
An external auditor selected by the audit committee of the Federal Reserve System regularly audits the Board of Governors and the Federal Reserve Banks. The GAO will audit some activities of the Board of Governors. These audits do not cover "most of the Fed's monetary policy actions or decisions, including discount window lending, open-market operations and any other transactions made under the direction of the Federal Open Market Committee" ...[nor may the GAO audit] "dealings with foreign governments and other central banks."

The annual and quarterly financial statements prepared by the Federal Reserve System conform to a basis of accounting that is set by the Federal Reserve Board and does not conform to Generally Accepted Accounting Principles (GAAP) or government Cost Accounting Standards (CAS). The financial reporting standards are defined in the Financial Accounting Manual for the Federal Reserve Banks. The cost accounting standards are defined in the Planning and Control System Manual. As of 27 August 2012, the Federal Reserve Board has been publishing unaudited financial reports for the Federal Reserve banks every quarter.

On November 7, 2008, Bloomberg L.P. brought a lawsuit against the board of governors of the Federal Reserve System to force the board to reveal the identities of firms for which it provided guarantees during the 2008 financial crisis. Bloomberg, L.P. won at the trial court and the Fed's appeals were rejected at both the United States Court of Appeals for the Second Circuit and the U.S. Supreme Court. The data was released on March 31, 2011.

== Monetary policy ==
The term "monetary policy" refers to the actions undertaken by a central bank, such as the Federal Reserve, to influence economic activity (the overall demand for goods and services) to help promote national economic goals. The Federal Reserve Act of 1913 gave the Federal Reserve authority to set monetary policy in the United States. The Fed's mandate for monetary policy is commonly known as the dual mandate of promoting maximum employment and stable prices, the latter being interpreted as a stable inflation rate of 2 percent per year on average. The Fed's monetary policy influences economic activity by influencing the general level of interest rates in the economy, which again via the monetary transmission mechanism affects households' and firms' demand for goods and services and in turn employment and inflation.

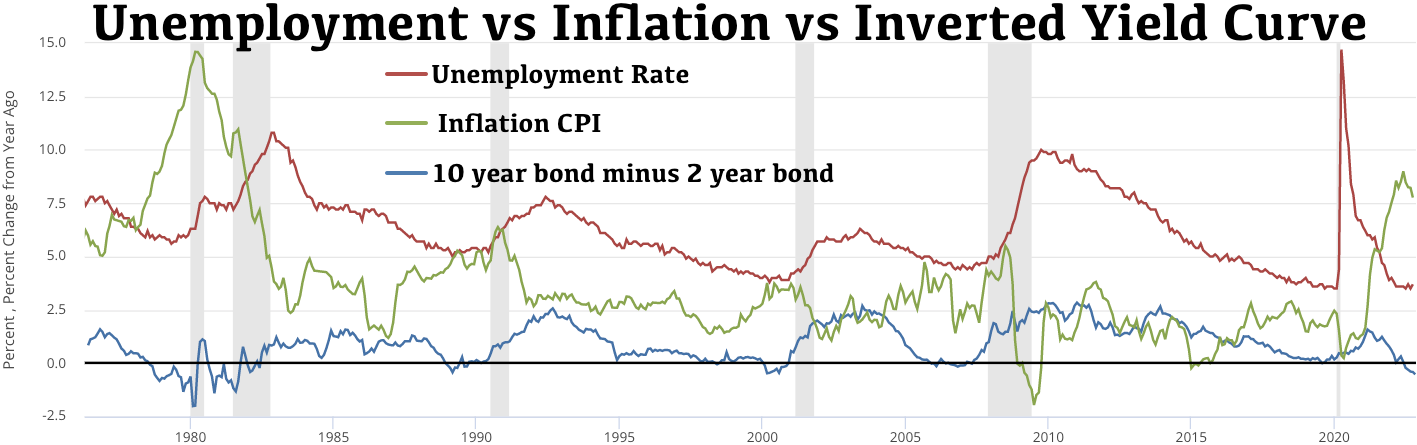
Unemployment vs Inflation vs Inverted yield curve Unemployment rate Inflation CPI 10 year bond minus 2 year bond inverted yield curve

=== Interbank lending ===
The Federal Reserve sets monetary policy by influencing the federal funds rate (FFR), which is the rate of interbank lending of reserve balances. The rate that banks charge each other for these loans is determined in the interbank market, and the Federal Reserve influences this rate through the "tools" of monetary policy described in the Tools section below. The federal funds rate is a short-term interest rate that the FOMC focuses on, which affects the longer-term interest rates throughout the economy. The Federal Reserve explained the implementation of its monetary policy in 2021:

The FOMC has the ability to influence the federal funds rate–and thus the cost of short-term interbank credit–by changing the rate of interest the Fed pays on reserve balances that banks hold at the Fed. A bank is unlikely to lend to another bank (or to any of its customers) at an interest rate lower than the rate that the bank can earn on reserve balances held at the Fed. And because overall reserve balances are currently abundant, if a bank wants to borrow reserve balances, it likely will be able to do so without having to pay a rate much above the rate of interest paid by the Fed.

Changes in the target for the federal funds rate affect overall financial conditions through various channels, including subsequent changes in the market interest rates that commercial banks and other lenders charge on short-term and longer-term loans, and changes in asset prices and in currency exchange rates, which again affects private consumption, investment and net export. By easening or tightening the stance of monetary policy, i.e. lowering or raising its target for the federal funds rate, the Fed can either spur or restrain growth in the overall US demand for goods and services. On November 18, 2026, Federal Reserve Governor Michael Barr said the Fed may need to raise interest rates further if inflation remains high and the economy continues to perform as expected. He said the U.S. economy remained strong, with low unemployment, steady consumer spending, and solid business investment, but noted that high inflation was still putting pressure on American families.

=== Tools ===
There are four main tools of monetary policy that the Federal Reserve uses to implement its monetary policy:

- Interest on reserve balances (IORB)
  - Interest paid on funds that banks hold in their reserve balance accounts at their Federal Reserve Bank. IORB is the primary tool for moving the federal funds rate within the target range.
- Overnight reverse repurchase agreement (ON RRP) facility
  - The Fed's standing offer to many large nonbank financial institutions to deposit funds at the Fed and earn interest. Acts as a supplementary tool for moving the FFR within the target range.
- Open market operations
  - Purchases and sales of U.S. Treasury and federal agency securities. Used to maintain an ample supply of reserves.
- Discount window
  - The Fed's lending to banks at the discount rate. Helps put a ceiling on the FFR.

==== Federal funds rate ====
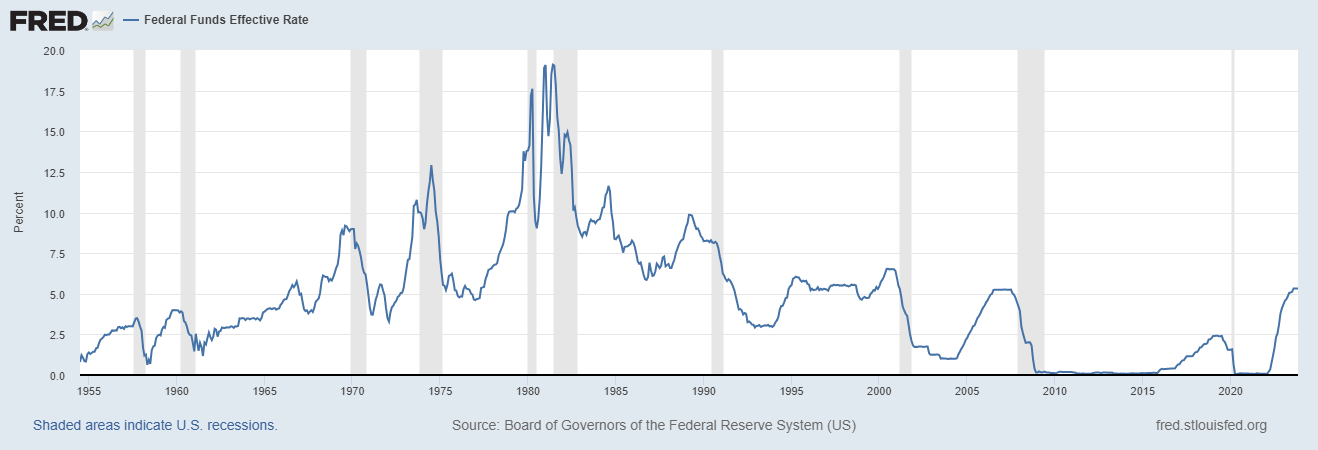

The Federal Reserve System implements monetary policy largely by targeting the federal funds rate. This is the interest rate that banks charge each other for overnight loans of federal funds, which are the reserves held by banks at the Fed. This rate is actually determined by the market and is not explicitly mandated by the Fed. The Fed therefore tries to align the effective federal funds rate with the targeted rate, mainly by adjusting its IORB rate. The Federal Reserve System usually adjusts the federal funds rate target by 0.25% or 0.50% at a time.

==== Interest on reserve balances ====
The interest on reserve balances (IORB) is the interest that the Fed pays on funds held by commercial banks in their reserve balance accounts at the individual Federal Reserve System banks. It is an administrated interest rate (i.e. set directly by the Fed as opposed to a market interest rate which is determined by the forces of supply and demand). As banks are unlikely to lend their reserves in the FFR market for less than they get paid by the Fed, the IORB guides the effective FFR and is used as the primary tool of the Fed's monetary policy.

==== Open market operations ====
Open market operations are done through the sale and purchase of United States Treasury securities, or "Treasurys". The Federal Reserve buys Treasurys both directly and via primary dealers, which have accounts at depository institutions.

The Federal Reserve's objective for open market operations has varied over the years. During the 1980s, the focus gradually shifted toward attaining a specified level of the federal funds rate (the rate that banks charge each other for overnight loans of federal funds, which are the reserves held by banks at the Fed), a process that was largely complete by the end of the decade.

Until the 2008 financial crisis, the Fed used open market operations as its primary tool to adjust the supply of reserve balances in order to keep the federal funds rate around the Fed's target. This regime is also known as a limited reserves regime. After the 2008 financial crisis, the Federal Reserve has adopted a so-called ample reserves regime where open market operations leading to modest changes in the supply of reserves are no longer effective in influencing the FFR. Instead the Fed uses its administered rates, in particular the IORB rate, to influence the FFR. However, open market operations are still an important maintenance tool in the overall framework of the conduct of monetary policy as they are used for ensuring that reserves remain ample.

===== Repurchase agreements =====
To smooth temporary or cyclical changes in the money supply, the desk engages in repurchase agreements (repos) with its primary dealers. Repos are essentially secured, short-term lending by the Fed. On the day of the transaction, the Fed deposits money in a primary dealer's reserve account, and receives the promised securities as collateral. When the transaction matures, the process unwinds: the Fed returns the collateral and charges the primary dealer's reserve account for the principal and accrued interest. The term of the repo (the time between settlement and maturity) can vary from 1 day (called an overnight repo) to 65 days.

==== Discount window and discount rate ====
The Federal Reserve System also directly sets the discount rate, which is the interest rate for "discount window lending", overnight loans that member banks borrow directly from the Fed. This rate is generally set at a rate close to 100 basis points above the target federal funds rate. The idea is to encourage banks to seek alternative funding before using the "discount rate" option. The equivalent operation by the European Central Bank is referred to as the "marginal lending facility".

Both the discount rate and the federal funds rate influence the prime rate, which is usually about 3 percentage points higher than the federal funds rate.

==== Term Deposit facility ====
The Term Deposit facility is a program through which the Federal Reserve Banks offer interest-bearing term deposits to eligible institutions. It is intended to facilitate the implementation of monetary policy by providing a tool by which the Federal Reserve can manage the aggregate quantity of reserve balances held by depository institutions. Funds placed in term deposits are removed from the accounts of participating institutions for the life of the term deposit and thus drain reserve balances from the banking system. The program was announced December 9, 2009, and approved April 30, 2010, with an effective date of June 4, 2010. Fed Chair Ben S. Bernanke, testifying before the House Committee on Financial Services, stated that the Term Deposit Facility would be used to reverse the expansion of credit during the Great Recession, by drawing funds out of the money markets into the Federal Reserve Banks. It would therefore result in increased market interest rates, acting as a brake on economic activity and inflation. The Federal Reserve authorized up to five "small-value offerings" in 2010 as a pilot program. After three of the offering auctions were successfully completed, it was announced that small-value auctions would continue on an ongoing basis.

==== Quantitative easing (QE) policy ====
A little-used tool of the Federal Reserve is the quantitative easing policy. Under that policy, the Federal Reserve buys back corporate bonds and mortgage backed securities held by banks or other financial institutions. This in effect puts money back into the financial institutions and allows them to make loans and conduct normal business. The bursting of the United States housing bubble prompted the Fed to buy mortgage-backed securities for the first time in November 2008. Over six weeks, a total of $1.25 trillion were purchased in order to stabilize the housing market, about one-fifth of all U.S. government-backed mortgages.

=== Expired policy tools ===
==== Reserve requirements ====
An instrument of monetary policy adjustment historically employed by the Federal Reserve System was the fractional reserve requirement, also known as the required reserve ratio. The required reserve ratio set the balance that the Federal Reserve System required a depository institution to hold in the Federal Reserve Banks. The required reserve ratio was set by the board of governors of the Federal Reserve System. The reserve requirements have changed over time and some history of these changes is published by the Federal Reserve.

As a response to the 2008 financial crisis, the Federal Reserve started making interest payments on depository institutions' required and excess reserve balances. The payment of interest on excess reserves gave the central bank greater opportunity to address credit market conditions while maintaining the federal funds rate close to the target rate set by the FOMC. The reserve requirement did not play a significant role in the post-2008 interest-on-excess-reserves regime, and in March 2020, the reserve ratio was set to zero for all banks, which meant that no bank was required to hold any reserves, and hence the reserve requirement effectively ceased to exist, though the legal framework exists for it to be reinstated at any time.

==== Temporary policy tools during the 2008 financial crisis ====
In order to address problems related to the subprime mortgage crisis and United States housing bubble, several new tools were created. The first new tool, called the Term Auction Facility, was added on December 12, 2007. It was announced as a temporary tool, but remained in place for a prolonged period of time. Creation of the second new tool, called the Term Securities Lending Facility, was announced on March 11, 2008. The main difference between these two facilities was that the Term Auction Facility was used to inject cash into the banking system whereas the Term securities Lending Facility was used to inject treasury securities into the banking system. Creation of the third tool, called the Primary Dealer Credit Facility (PDCF), was announced on March 16, 2008. The PDCF was a fundamental change in Federal Reserve policy because it enabled the Fed to lend directly to primary dealers, which was previously against Fed policy. The differences between these three facilities was described by the Federal Reserve:

The Term auction Facility program offers term funding to depository institutions via a bi-weekly auction, for fixed amounts of credit. The Term securities Lending Facility will be an auction for a fixed amount of lending of Treasury general collateral in exchange for OMO-eligible and AAA/Aaa rated private-label residential mortgage-backed securities. The Primary Dealer Credit Facility now allows eligible primary dealers to borrow at the existing Discount Rate for up to 120 days.

Some measures taken by the Federal Reserve to address the 2008 financial crisis had not been used since the Great Depression.

==== Term auction facility ====
The Term Auction Facility was a program in which the Federal Reserve auctioned term funds to depository institutions. The creation of this facility was announced by the Federal Reserve on December 12, 2007, and was done in conjunction with the Bank of Canada, the Bank of England, the European Central Bank, and the Swiss National Bank to address elevated pressures in short-term funding markets. The reason it was created was that banks were not lending funds to one another and banks in need of funds were refusing to go to the discount window. Banks were not lending money to each other because there was a fear that the loans would not be paid back. Banks refused to go to the discount window because it was usually associated with the stigma of bank failure. Under the Term Auction Facility, the identity of the banks in need of funds was protected in order to avoid the stigma of bank failure. Foreign exchange swap lines with the European Central Bank and Swiss National Bank were opened so the banks in Europe could have access to U.S. dollars. The final Term Auction Facility auction was carried out on March 8, 2010.

==== Term securities lending facility ====
The Term securities Lending Facility was a 28-day facility that offered Treasury general collateral to the Federal Reserve Bank of New York's primary dealers in exchange for other program-eligible collateral. It was intended to promote liquidity in the financing markets for Treasury and other collateral and thus to foster the functioning of financial markets more generally. Like the Term Auction Facility, the TSLF was done in conjunction with the Bank of Canada, the Bank of England, the European Central Bank, and the Swiss National Bank. The resource allowed dealers to switch debt that was less liquid for U.S. government securities that were easily tradable. The currency swap lines with the European Central Bank and Swiss National Bank were increased. The TSLF was closed on February 1, 2010.

==== Primary dealer credit facility ====
The Primary Dealer Credit Facility (PDCF) was an overnight loan facility that provided funding to primary dealers in exchange for a specified range of eligible collateral and was intended to foster the functioning of financial markets more generally. The PDCF established in 2008 was closed on February 1, 2010, alongside other crisis-era facilities. A new PDCF was introduced in March 2020 in response to COVID-19-related market disruptions, and that facility ceased extending credit in 2021.

==== Asset Backed Commercial Paper Money Market Mutual Fund Liquidity Facility ====
The Asset Backed Commercial Paper Money Market Mutual Fund Liquidity Facility (ABCPMMMFLF) was also called the AMLF. The Facility began operations on September 22, 2008, and was closed on February 1, 2010. All U.S. depository institutions, bank holding companies (parent companies or U.S. broker-dealer affiliates), or U.S. branches and agencies of foreign banks were eligible to borrow under this facility pursuant to the discretion of the FRBB.

Collateral eligible for pledge under the Facility was required to meet the following criteria:

- was purchased by Borrower on or after September 19, 2008, from a registered investment company that held itself out as a money market mutual fund;
- was purchased by Borrower at the Fund's acquisition cost as adjusted for amortization of premium or accretion of discount on the ABCP through the date of its purchase by Borrower;
- was rated at the time pledged to FRBB, not lower than A1, F1, or P1 by at least two major rating agencies or, if rated by only one major rating agency, the ABCP must have been rated within the top rating category by that agency;
- was issued by an entity organized under the laws of the United States or a political subdivision thereof under a program that was in existence on September 18, 2008; and
- had stated maturity that did not exceed 120 days if the Borrower was a bank or 270 days for non-bank Borrowers.

==== Commercial Paper Funding Facility ====
On October 7, 2008, the Federal Reserve further expanded the collateral it would loan against to include commercial paper using the Commercial Paper Funding Facility (CPFF). The action made the Fed a crucial source of credit for non-financial businesses in addition to commercial banks and investment firms. Fed officials said they would buy as much of the debt as necessary to get the market functioning again. They refused to say how much that might be, but they noted that around $1.3 trillion worth of commercial paper would qualify. There was $1.61 trillion in outstanding commercial paper, seasonally adjusted, on the market as of 1 October 2008, according to the most recent data from the Fed. That was down from $1.70 trillion in the previous week. Since the summer of 2007, the market had shrunk from more than $2.2 trillion. This program lent out a total $738 billion before it was closed. Forty-five out of 81 of the companies participating in this program were foreign firms. Research shows that Troubled Asset Relief Program (TARP) recipients were twice as likely to participate in the program than other commercial paper issuers who did not take advantage of the TARP bailout. The Fed incurred no losses from the CPFF.

In response to the economic disruptions caused by the COVID-19 pandemic, the Federal Reserve reintroduced the Commercial Paper Funding Facility (CPFF) on March 17, 2020, to support the flow of credit to households and businesses by purchasing eligible commercial paper. The CPFF was modeled after the 2008 crisis-era facility and aimed to stabilize the commercial paper market. The facility ceased operations on March 31, 2021, and is not in place as of April 2025.

==== Term Asset-Backed Security Loan Facility ====
The Term Asset-Backed Securities Loan Facility (TALF) was a temporary program announced on November 25, 2008, and launched in March 2009 by the Federal Reserve in collaboration with the U.S. Treasury to stimulate consumer and business lending. It provided non-recourse loans to investors to purchase asset-backed securities (ABS), such as auto loans, student loans, and credit card receivables, aiming to enhance liquidity in these markets. The facility ceased issuing new loans in June 2010 and was fully wound down by 2015. As a significant tool during the 2008 financial crisis, TALF focused on ABS markets rather than direct banking system liquidity, distinguishing it from other crisis-era facilities.

== History ==
Timeline of central banking in the United States
Dates	System
1782–1791	Bank of North America (de facto, under the Confederation Congress)
1791–1811	First Bank of the United States
1811–1816	No central bank
1816–1836	Second Bank of the United States
1837–1862	Free Banking Era
1846–1921	Independent Treasury System
1863–1913	National Banks
1913–present	Federal Reserve System

=== Central banking in the United States, 1791–1913 ===
The first attempt at a national currency was during the American Revolutionary War. In 1775, the Continental Congress, as well as the states, began issuing paper currency, calling the bills "Continentals". The Continentals were backed only by future tax revenue, and were used to help finance the Revolutionary War. Overprinting, as well as British counterfeiting, caused the value of the Continental to diminish quickly. This experience with paper money led the United States to strip the power to issue Bills of Credit (paper money) from a draft of the new Constitution on August 16, 1787, as well as banning such issuance by the various states, and limiting the states' ability to make anything but gold or silver coin legal tender on August 28.

In 1791, the government granted the First Bank of the United States a charter to operate as the U.S. central bank until 1811. The First Bank of the United States came to an end under President Madison when Congress refused to renew its charter. The Second Bank of the United States was established in 1816, and lost its authority to be the central bank of the U.S. twenty years later under President Jackson when its charter expired. Both banks were based upon the Bank of England. Ultimately, a third national bank, known as the Federal Reserve, was established in 1913 and still exists to this day.

==== First Central Bank, 1791 and Second Central Bank, 1816 ====
The first U.S. institution with central banking responsibilities was the First Bank of the United States, chartered by Congress and signed into law by President George Washington on February 25, 1791, at the urging of Alexander Hamilton. This was done despite strong opposition from Thomas Jefferson and James Madison, among numerous others. The charter was for twenty years and expired in 1811 under President Madison, when Congress refused to renew it.

In 1816, however, Madison revived it in the form of the Second Bank of the United States. Years later, early renewal of the bank's charter became the primary issue in the reelection of President Andrew Jackson. After Jackson, who was opposed to the central bank, was reelected, he pulled the government's funds out of the bank. Jackson was the only President to completely pay off the national debt but his efforts to close the bank contributed to the Panic of 1837. The bank's charter was not renewed in 1836, and it would fully dissolve after several years as a private corporation.

From 1837 to 1862, in the Free Banking Era there was no formal central bank. From 1846 to 1921, an Independent Treasury System ruled. From 1863 to 1913, a system of national banks was instituted by the 1863 National Banking Act during which a series of bank panics, in 1873, 1893, and 1907 occurred.

==== Creation of Third Central Bank, 1907–1913 ====
The main motivation for the third central banking system came from the Panic of 1907, which caused a renewed desire among legislators, economists, and bankers for an overhaul of the monetary system. During the last quarter of the 19th century and the beginning of the 20th century, the United States economy went through a series of financial panics. According to many economists, the previous national banking system had two main weaknesses: an inelastic currency and a lack of liquidity. In 1908, Congress enacted the Aldrich–Vreeland Act, which provided for an emergency currency and established the National Monetary Commission to study banking and currency reform. The National Monetary Commission returned with recommendations which were repeatedly rejected by Congress. A revision crafted during a secret meeting on Jekyll Island by Senator Aldrich and representatives of the nation's top finance and industrial groups later became the basis of the Federal Reserve Act.

===== Federal Reserve Act, 1913 =====
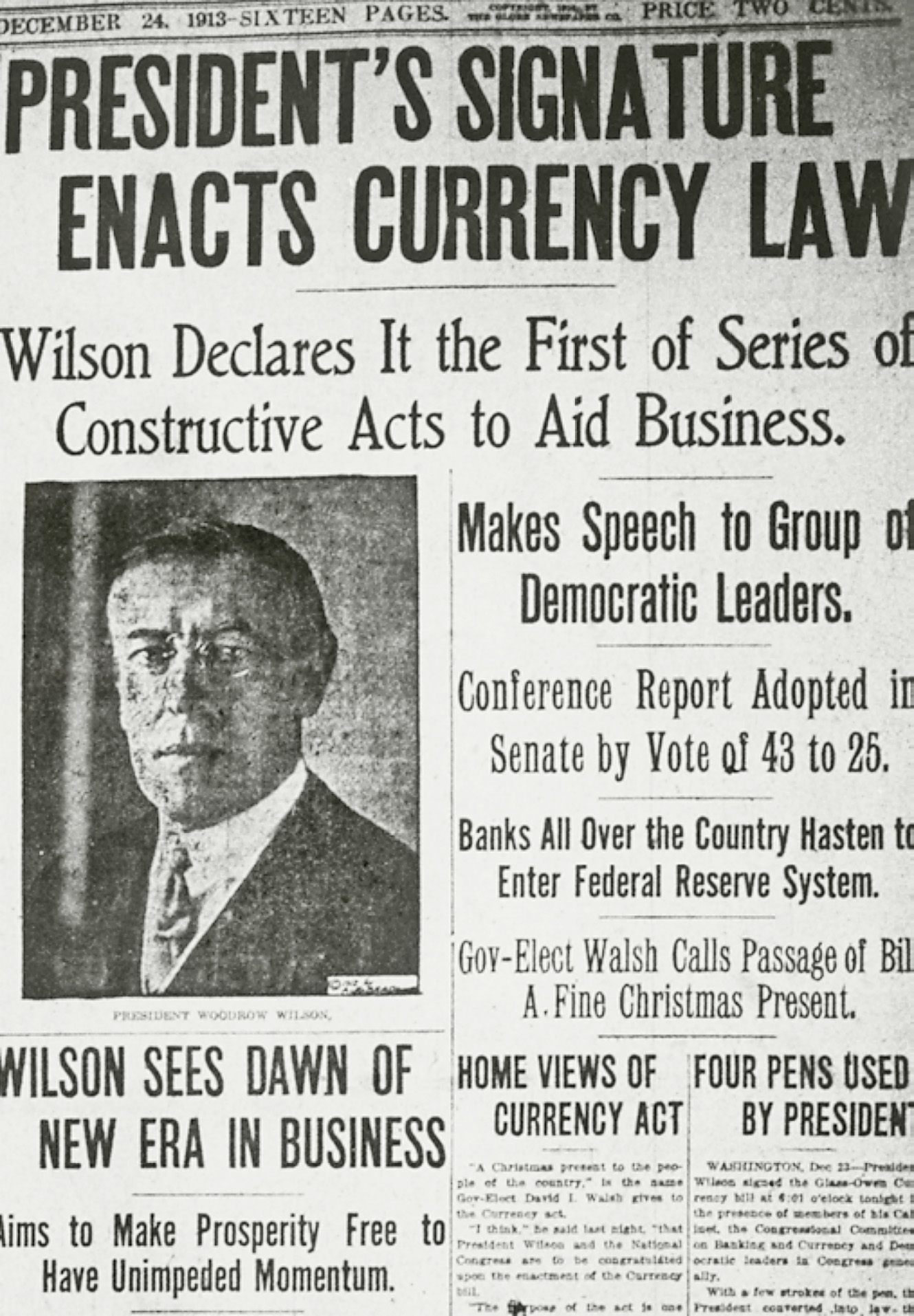
Newspaper clipping, December 24, 1913

The head of the bipartisan National Monetary Commission was financial expert and Senate Republican leader Nelson Aldrich. Aldrich set up two commissions – one to study the American monetary system in depth and the other, headed by Aldrich himself, to study the European central banking systems and report on them.

In early November 1910, Aldrich met with five well known members of the New York banking community to devise a central banking bill. Paul Warburg, an attendee of the meeting and longtime advocate of central banking in the U.S., later wrote that Aldrich was "bewildered at all that he had absorbed abroad and he was faced with the difficult task of writing a highly technical bill while being harassed by the daily grind of his parliamentary duties". After ten days of deliberation, the bill, which would later be referred to as the "Aldrich Plan", was agreed upon. It had several key components, including a central bank with a Washington-based headquarters and fifteen branches located throughout the U.S. in geographically strategic locations, and a uniform elastic currency based on gold and commercial paper. Aldrich believed a central banking system with no political involvement was best, but was convinced by Warburg that a plan with no public control was not politically feasible. The compromise involved representation of the public sector on the board of directors.

Aldrich's bill met much opposition from politicians. Critics charged Aldrich of being biased due to his close ties to wealthy bankers such as J. P. Morgan and John D. Rockefeller Jr., Aldrich's son-in-law. Most Republicans favored the Aldrich Plan, but it lacked enough support in Congress to pass because rural and western states viewed it as favoring the "eastern establishment". In contrast, progressive Democrats favored a reserve system owned and operated by the government; they believed that public ownership of the central bank would end Wall Street's control of the American currency supply. Conservative Democrats fought for a privately owned, yet decentralized, reserve system, which would still be free of Wall Street's control.

The original Aldrich Plan was dealt a fatal blow in 1912, when Democrats won the White House and Congress. Nonetheless, President Woodrow Wilson believed that the Aldrich plan would suffice with a few modifications. The plan became the basis for the Federal Reserve Act, which was proposed by Senator Robert Owen in May 1913. The primary difference between the two bills was the transfer of control of the board of directors (called the Federal Open Market Committee in the Federal Reserve Act) to the government. The bill passed Congress on December 23, 1913, on a mostly partisan basis, with most Democrats voting "yea" and most Republicans voting "nay".

The House voted on December 22, 1913, with 298 voting yes to 60 voting no. The Senate voted 43–25 on December 23, 1913. President Woodrow Wilson signed the bill later that day.

=== Federal Reserve era, 1913–present ===
Key laws affecting the Federal Reserve have been:

- Federal Reserve Act, 1913
- Glass–Steagall Act, 1933
- Banking Act of 1935
- Employment Act of 1946
- Federal Reserve-Treasury Department Accord of 1951
- Bank Holding Company Act of 1956 and the amendments of 1970
- Federal Reserve Reform Act of 1977
- International Banking Act of 1978
- Full Employment and Balanced Growth Act (1978)
- Depository Institutions Deregulation and Monetary Control Act (1980)
- Financial Institutions Reform, Recovery and Enforcement Act of 1989
- Federal Deposit Insurance Corporation Improvement Act of 1991
- Gramm–Leach–Bliley Act (1999)
- Financial Services Regulatory Relief Act (2006)
- Emergency Economic Stabilization Act (2008)
- Dodd–Frank Wall Street Reform and Consumer Protection Act (2010)

The Banking Act of 1935 created the modern structure of the Federal Reserve and placed monetary decisions beyond presidential control, thus enshrining the independence of the Federal Reserve.

== Economic data ==
The Federal Reserve records and publishes large amounts of data, including the Board of Governors' Economic Data and Research page, Statistical Releases and Historical Data Page, and the St. Louis Fed's FRED (Federal Reserve Economic Data) page. The Federal Open Market Committee (FOMC) examines many economic indicators prior to determining monetary policy. Some economists have criticised the economic data compiled by the Fed. The Fed sponsors much of the monetary economics research in the U.S., and Lawrence H. White objects that this makes it less likely for researchers to publish findings challenging the status quo.

=== Net worth of households and nonprofit organizations ===
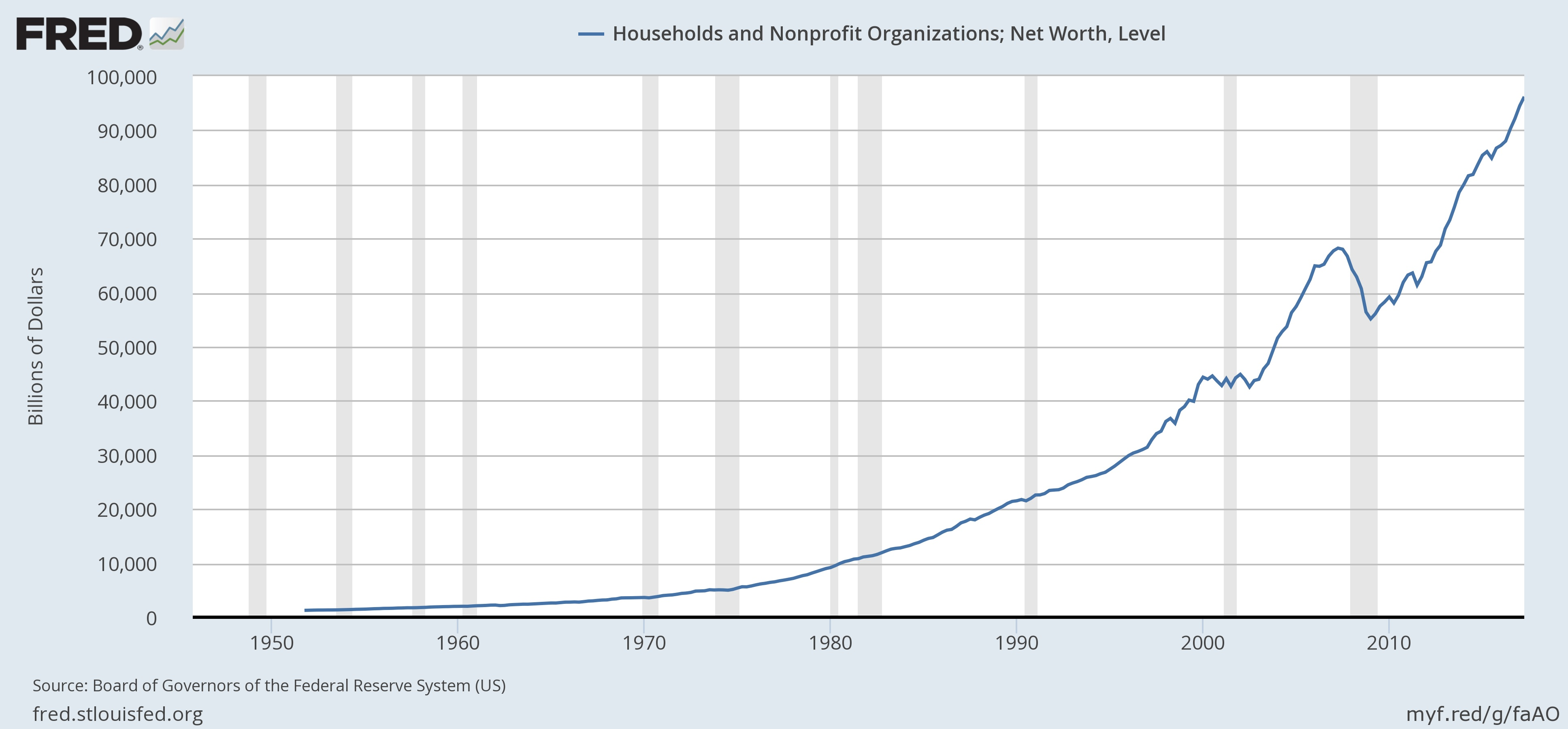
Total Net Worth‍—‌Balance Sheet of Households and Nonprofit Organizations 1949–2012

The net worth of households and nonprofit organizations in the United States is published by the Federal Reserve in a report titled Flow of Funds. At the end of the third quarter of fiscal year 2012, this value was $64.8 trillion. At the end of the first quarter of fiscal year 2014, this value was $95.5 trillion. As of the fourth quarter of 2024, the net worth of households and nonprofit organizations reached $172.7 trillion, driven primarily by gains in corporate equity and real estate values.

=== Money supply ===
The most common measures are named M0 (narrowest), M1, M2, and M3. In the United States they are defined by the Federal Reserve as follows:

Measure	Definition
M0	The total of all physical currency, plus accounts at the central bank that can be exchanged for physical currency.
M1	M0 + those portions of M0 held as reserves or vault cash + the amount in demand accounts ("checking" or "current" accounts).
M2	M1 + most savings accounts, money market accounts, and small denomination time deposits (certificates of deposit of under $100,000).
M3	M2 + all other CDs, deposits of eurodollars and repurchase agreements.

The Federal Reserve stopped publishing M3 statistics in March 2006, saying that the data cost a lot to collect but did not provide significantly useful information. The other three money supply measures continue to be provided in detail.

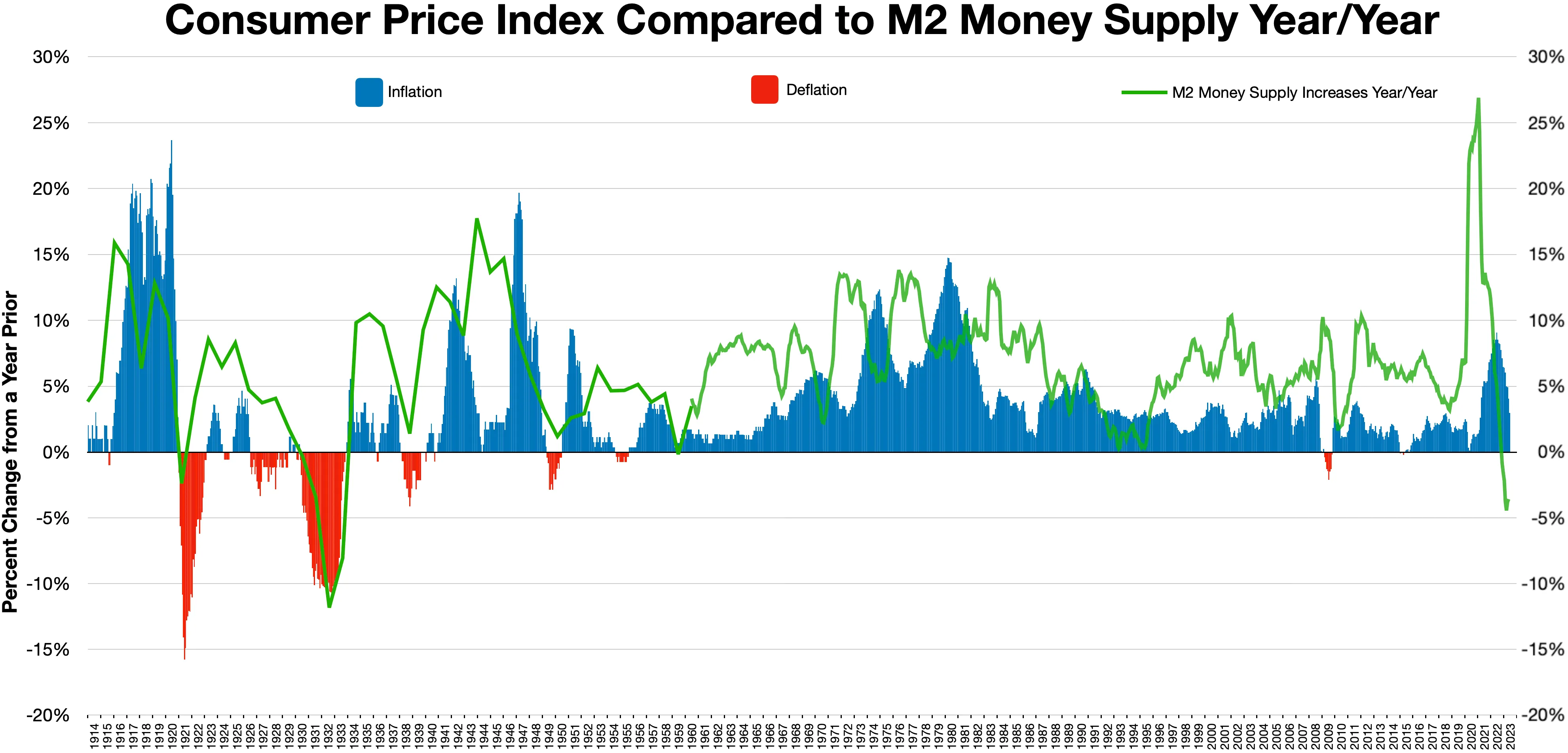
Inflation Deflation M2 money supply increases Year/Year

=== Personal consumption expenditures price index ===
The personal consumption expenditures price index, also referred to as simply the PCE price index, is used as one measure of the value of money. It is a United States-wide indicator of the average increase in prices for all domestic personal consumption. Using a variety of data including United States Consumer Price Index and U.S. Producer Price Index prices, it is derived from the largest component of the gross domestic product in the BEA's National Income and Product Accounts, personal consumption expenditures.

One of the Fed's main roles is to maintain price stability, which means that the Fed's ability to keep a low inflation rate is a long-term measure of their success. Although the Fed is not required to maintain inflation within a specific range, their long run target for the growth of the PCE price index is between 1.5 and 2 percent. There has been debate among policy makers as to whether the Federal Reserve should have a specific inflation targeting policy.

==== Inflation and the economy ====
Most mainstream economists favor a low, steady rate of inflation. Chief economist, and advisor to the Federal Reserve, the Congressional Budget Office and the Council of Economic Advisers, Diane C. Swonk observed, in 2022, that "From the Fed's perspective, you have to remember inflation is kind of like cancer. If you don't deal with it now with something that may be painful, you could have something that metastasized and becomes much more chronic later on."

Low (as opposed to zero or negative) inflation may reduce the severity of economic recessions by enabling the labor market to adjust more quickly in a downturn, and reduce the risk that a liquidity trap prevents monetary policy from stabilizing the economy. The task of keeping the rate of inflation low and stable is usually given to monetary authorities.

United States unemployment rates 1975–2010 showing variance between the fifty states

== Budget ==
The Federal Reserve is self-funded. Over 90% of Fed revenues come from open market operations, specifically the interest on the portfolio of Treasury securities as well as "capital gains/losses" that may arise from the buying/selling of the securities and their derivatives as part of Open Market Operations. The balance of revenues come from sales of financial services (check and electronic payment processing) and discount window loans.

The Federal Reserve Board creates a budget report once per year for Congress. There are two reports with budget information. The one that lists the complete balance statements with income and expenses, as well as the net profit or loss, is the large report simply titled, "Annual Report". It also includes data about employment throughout the system. The other report, which explains in more detail the expenses of the different aspects of the whole system, is called "Annual Report: Budget Review".

=== Remittance payments to the Treasury ===
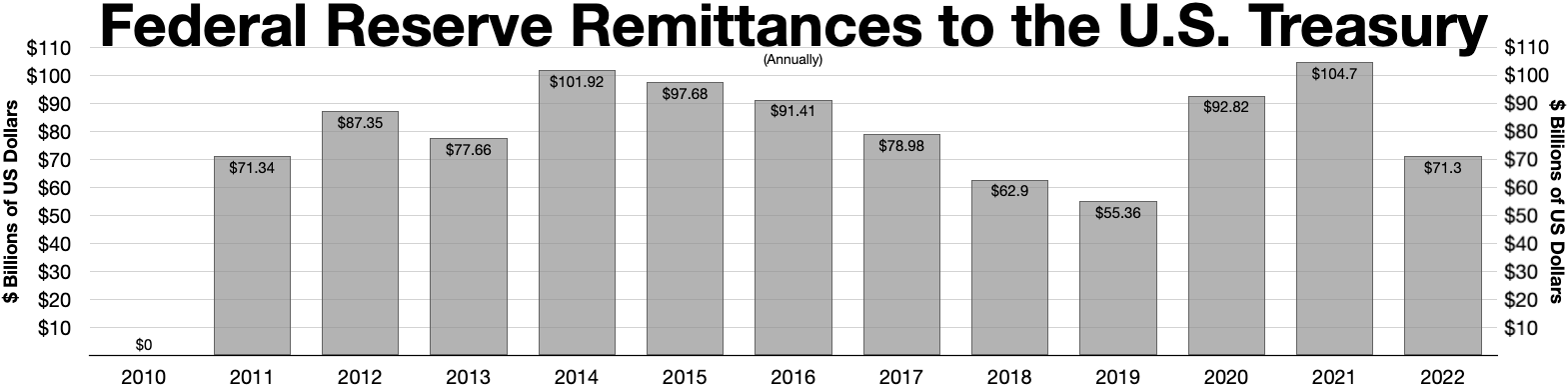
Federal Reserve remittances to the U.S. Treasury (annually)

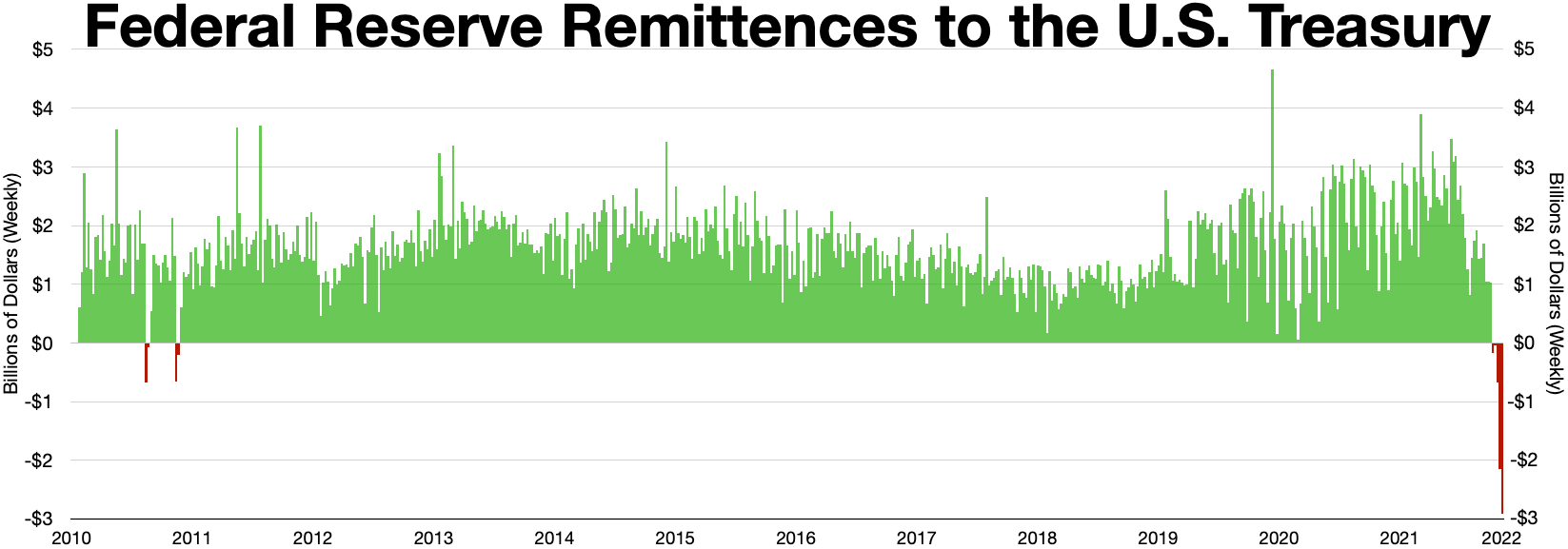
Federal Reserve Remittances to the Treasury (weekly)

The Federal Reserve has been remitting interest that it has been receiving back to the United States Treasury. Most of the assets the Fed holds are U.S. Treasury bonds and mortgage-backed securities that it has been purchasing as part of quantitative easing since the 2008 financial crisis. In 2022, the Fed started quantitative tightening (QT) and selling these assets and taking a loss on them in the secondary bond market. As a result, the nearly $100 billion that it was remitting annually to the Treasury, is expected to be discontinued during QT.

In 2023, the Federal Reserve reported a net negative income of $114.3 billion. This triggered the creation of a deferred asset liability on the Federal Reserve balance sheet booked as "Interest on Federal Reserve notes due to U.S. Treasury" totaling $133.3 billion. The deferred asset is the amount of net excess revenues the Federal Reserve must realize before remittances can continue. It does not have any impact on the ability of the Federal Reserve to conduct monetary policy or meet its obligations. The Federal Reserve has estimated the deferred asset will last until mid-2027.

== Balance sheet ==
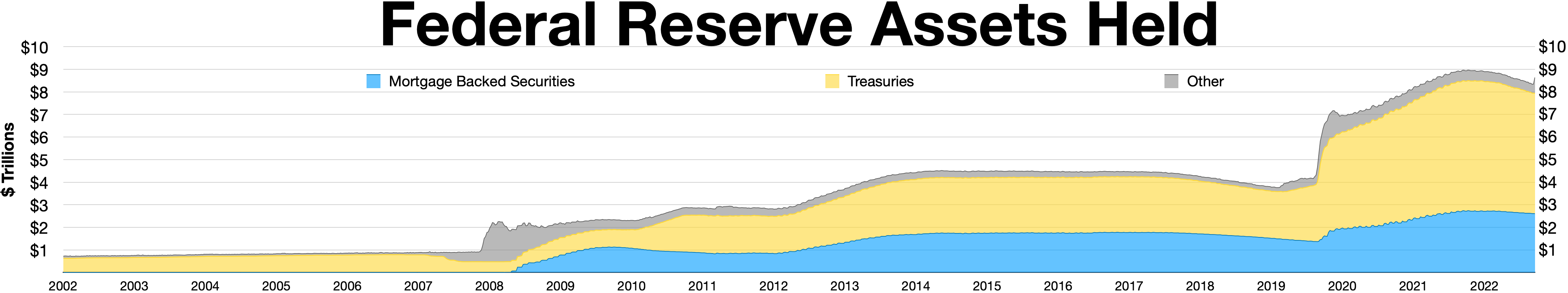
Federal reserve assets held Other assets US Treasuries Mortgage-backed security

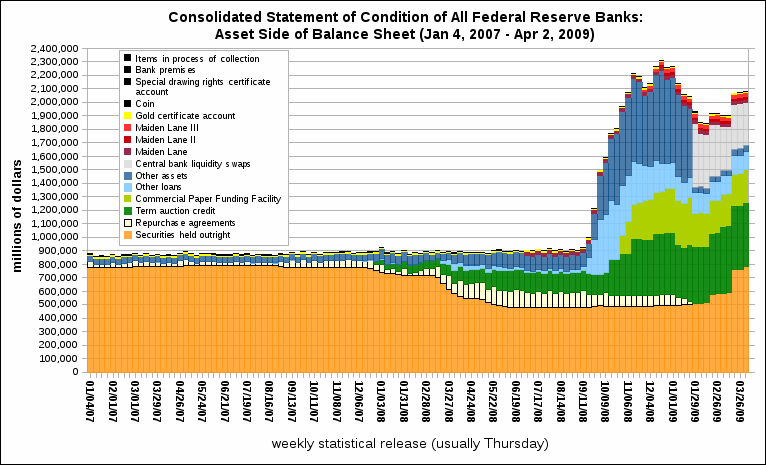
Total combined assets for all 12 Federal Reserve Banks, 2007–2009

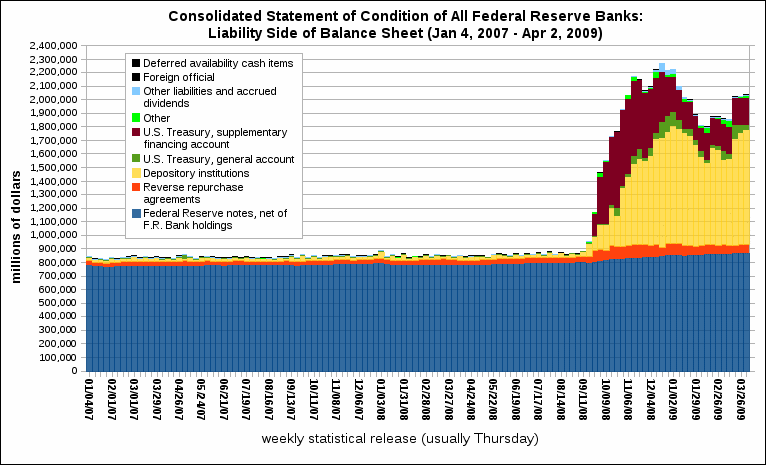
Total combined liabilities for all 12 Federal Reserve Banks, 2007–2009

One of the keys to understanding the Federal Reserve is the Federal Reserve balance sheet (or balance statement). In accordance with Section 11 of the Federal Reserve Act, the board of governors of the Federal Reserve System publishes once each week the "Consolidated Statement of Condition of All Federal Reserve Banks" showing the condition of each Federal Reserve bank and a consolidated statement for all Federal Reserve banks. The board of governors requires that excess earnings of the Reserve Banks be transferred to the Treasury as interest on Federal Reserve notes.

The Federal Reserve releases its balance sheet every Thursday. Below is the balance sheet as of 8 April 2021 (in billions of dollars):

Assets in billions of dollars
Item	Amount
Gold stock	11.04
Special drawing rights certificate account	5.20
Treasury currency outstanding (coin)	1.46
Securities, unamortized premiums and discounts, repurchase agreements, and loans	7550.43
Securities held outright	7146.06
U.S. Treasury securities	4959.03
Bills	326.04
Notes and bonds, nominal	4251.66
Notes and Bonds, inflation-indexed	334.76
Inflation compensation	46.57
Federal agency debt securities	2.35
Mortgage-backed securities	2184.68
Unamortized premiums on securities held outright	351.11
Unamortized discounts on securities held outright	-9.56
Repurchase agreements	0
Loans	62.81
Net portfolio holdings of Commercial Paper Funding Facility II LLC	8.56
Net portfolio holdings of Corporate Credit Facilities LLC	25.94
Net portfolio holdings of MS Facilities LLC (Main Street Lending Program)	30.96
Net portfolio holdings of Municipal Liquidity Facility LLC	11.41
Net portfolio holdings of TALF II LLC	5.28
Items in process of collection	0.04
Bank premises	1.91
Central bank liquidity swaps	0.87
Foreign currency denominated assets	21.37
Other assets	34.42
Total assets	7708.88

Liabilities in billions of dollars
Item	Amount
Federal Reserve notes, net of F.R. Bank holdings	2101.19
Reverse repurchase agreements	272.07
Deposits	5234.02
Term deposits held by depository institutions	0
Other deposits held by depository institutions	3944.06
U.S. Treasury, general account	954.97
Foreign official	32.25
Other deposits	302.74
Deferred availability cash items	0.15
Treasury contributions to credit facilities	51.78
Other liabilities and accrued dividends	10.40
Total liabilities	7669.62

Capital (a.k.a. net equity) in billions of dollars
Item	Amount
Capital paid in	32.48
Surplus	6.79
Other capital	0
Total capital	39.27

Memo (off-balance-sheet items) in billions of dollars
Item	Amount
Marketable securities held in custody for foreign official and international accounts	3548.94
Marketable U.S. Treasury securities	3114.90
Federal agency debt and mortgage-backed securities	346.41
Other securities	87.62
Securities lent to dealers	40.45
Overnight	40.45
U.S. Treasury securities	40.45
Federal agency debt securities	0

In addition, the balance sheet also indicates which assets are held as collateral against Federal Reserve Notes.

Federal Reserve Notes and collateral in billions of dollars
Item	Amount
Federal Reserve Notes outstanding	2255.55
Less: Notes held by F.R. Banks	154.35
Federal Reserve notes to be collateralized	2101.19
Collateral held against Federal Reserve notes	2101.19
Gold certificate account	11.04
Special drawing rights certificate account	5.20
U.S. Treasury, agency debt, and mortgage-backed securities pledged	2084.96
Other assets pledged	0

As of August 2024, the Fed's total assets on balance sheet were $7.139 trillion.

== Criticism ==
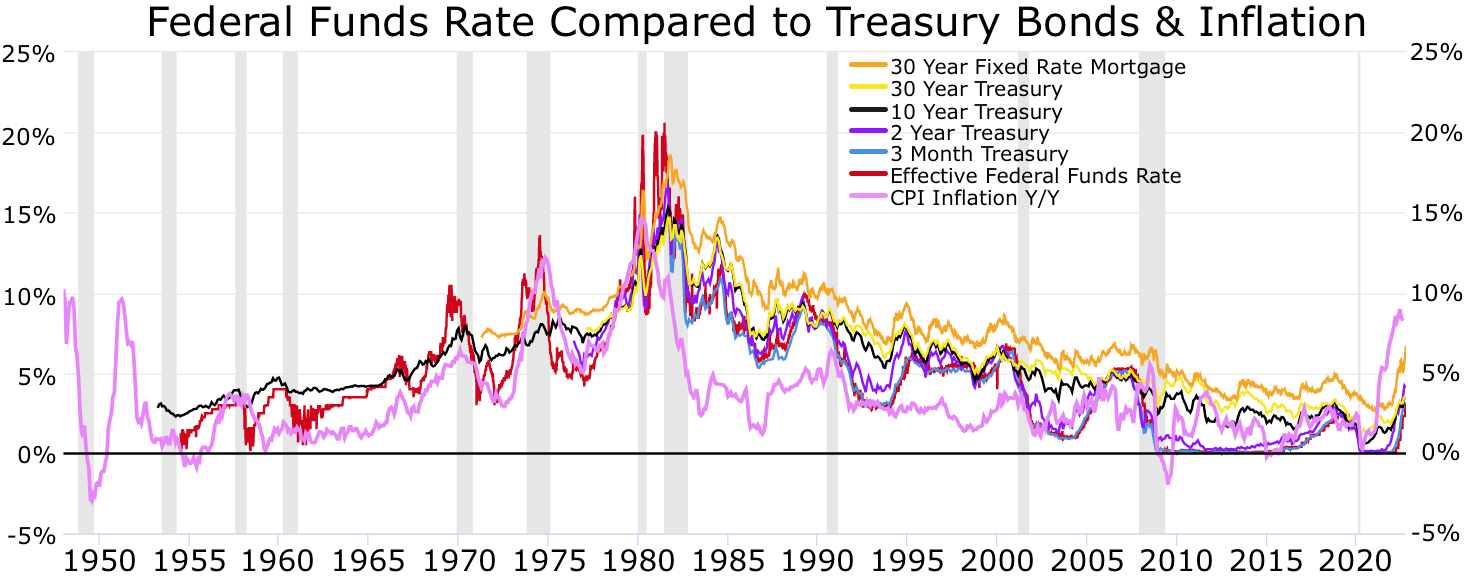
30 year mortgage average 30 Year Treasury Bond 10 Year Treasury Bond 2 Year Treasury Bond 3 month Treasury Bond Effective Federal Funds Rate CPI inflation year/year Recessions

The Federal Reserve System has faced various criticisms since its inception in 1913. Some of the most common critiques focus on its monetary policy, lack of transparency, and its potential role in exacerbating financial instability. Critics argue that the Fed’s expansionary policies—such as lowering interest rates and increasing the money supply—can lead to inflation, asset bubbles, and economic distortions. Prominent economists like Milton Friedman have criticized the Fed for contributing to economic downturns, including its role in the Great Depression. Economist Hans Sennholz called the Fed's creation, "the most tragic blunder ever committed by Congress. The day it was passed, old America died and a new era began. A new institution was born that was to cause, or greatly contribute to, the unprecedented economic instability in the decades to come."

Libertarian figures such as Ron Paul have been especially vocal in calling for greater accountability and transparency within the Fed, advocating for measures such as auditing the Federal Reserve to ensure it serves the public interest rather than benefiting large financial institutions. Additionally, some critics, including Rand Paul, argue that the Fed disproportionately serves the interests of the banking elite, given the backgrounds of many of its officials in finance and banking, leading to potential conflicts of interest and policies that favor Wall Street over the general economy.

Advocates of Austrian economics, such as Ludwig von Mises and Murray Rothbard, believe that the Federal Reserve’s departure from the gold standard in 1971 and its move to fiat currency destabilized the monetary system and undermined financial stability. Ron Paul believes the Fed should be abolished and replaced with a return to the gold standard. The Federal Reserve’s handling of the 2008 financial crisis has also been a focal point of criticism, with some arguing that the Fed’s response—bailing out large banks and financial institutions—created moral hazard and worsened the economic collapse.

During COVID-19 pandemic, the Federal Reserve's policies such as increasing its bank reserves, quantitative easing (QE), and keeping interest rates near zero until March 2022 had been criticised by economists, especially monetarists, as greatly contributing to the inflation spike which peaked at a record high in half a century. Part of the Fed's policy during the Covid-19 pandemic arguably cemented moral hazard and exposed the lack of Federal Reserve independence. Scott Minerd the Chief Officer of Investments at Guggenheim Investments explained that 2020 stimulus socialized credit risk and the price of a loan would now be determined by the Fed's willingness to buy it. In 2021, the federal reserve rewrote its trading rules after two senior officials at the Fed made ethically questionable trades amidst the start of the pandemic.

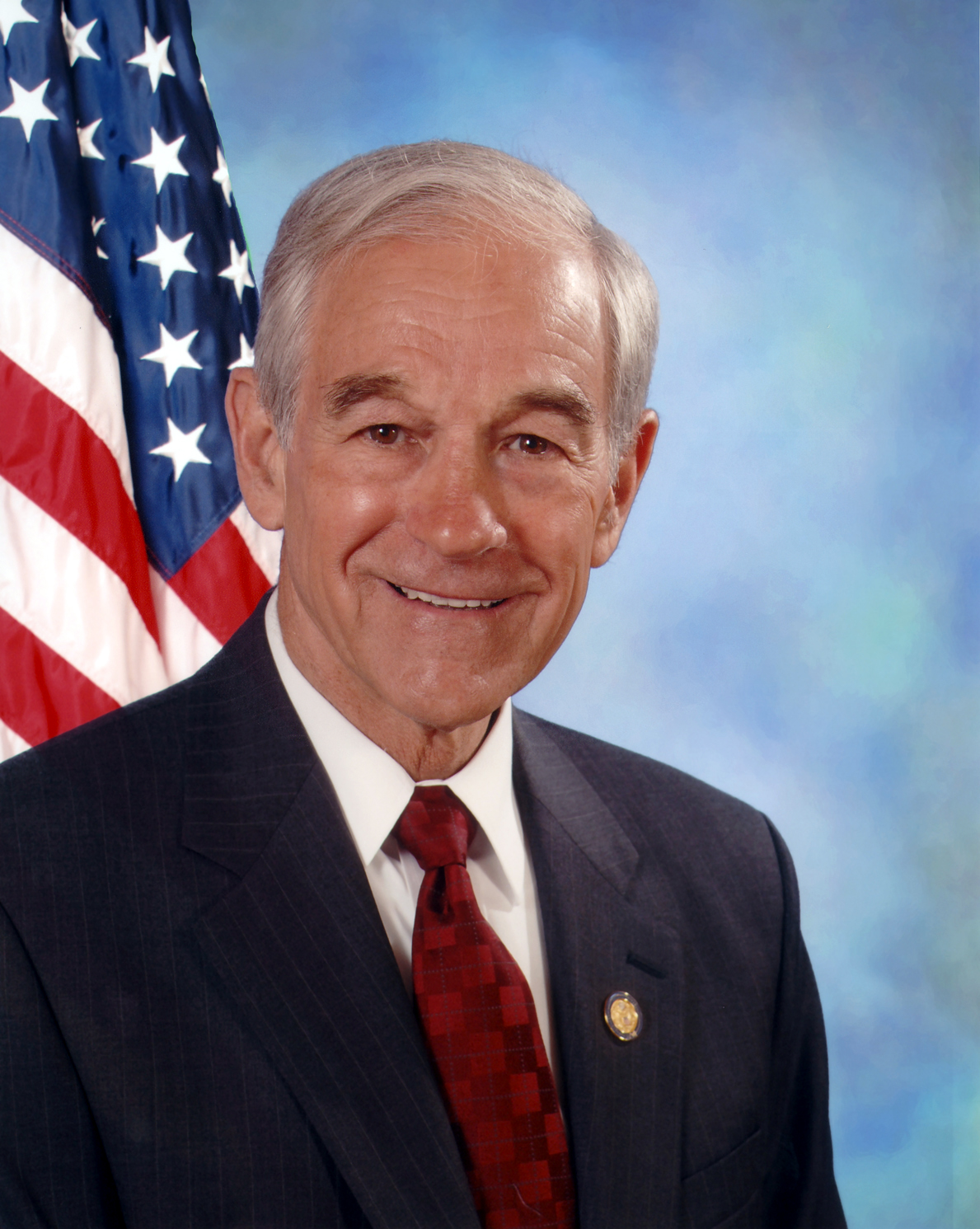
Ron Paul, a longtime critic of the Federal Reserve, argues in End the Fed that the central bank undermines economic stability, enables inflation, and should be abolished in favor of a free-market monetary system.

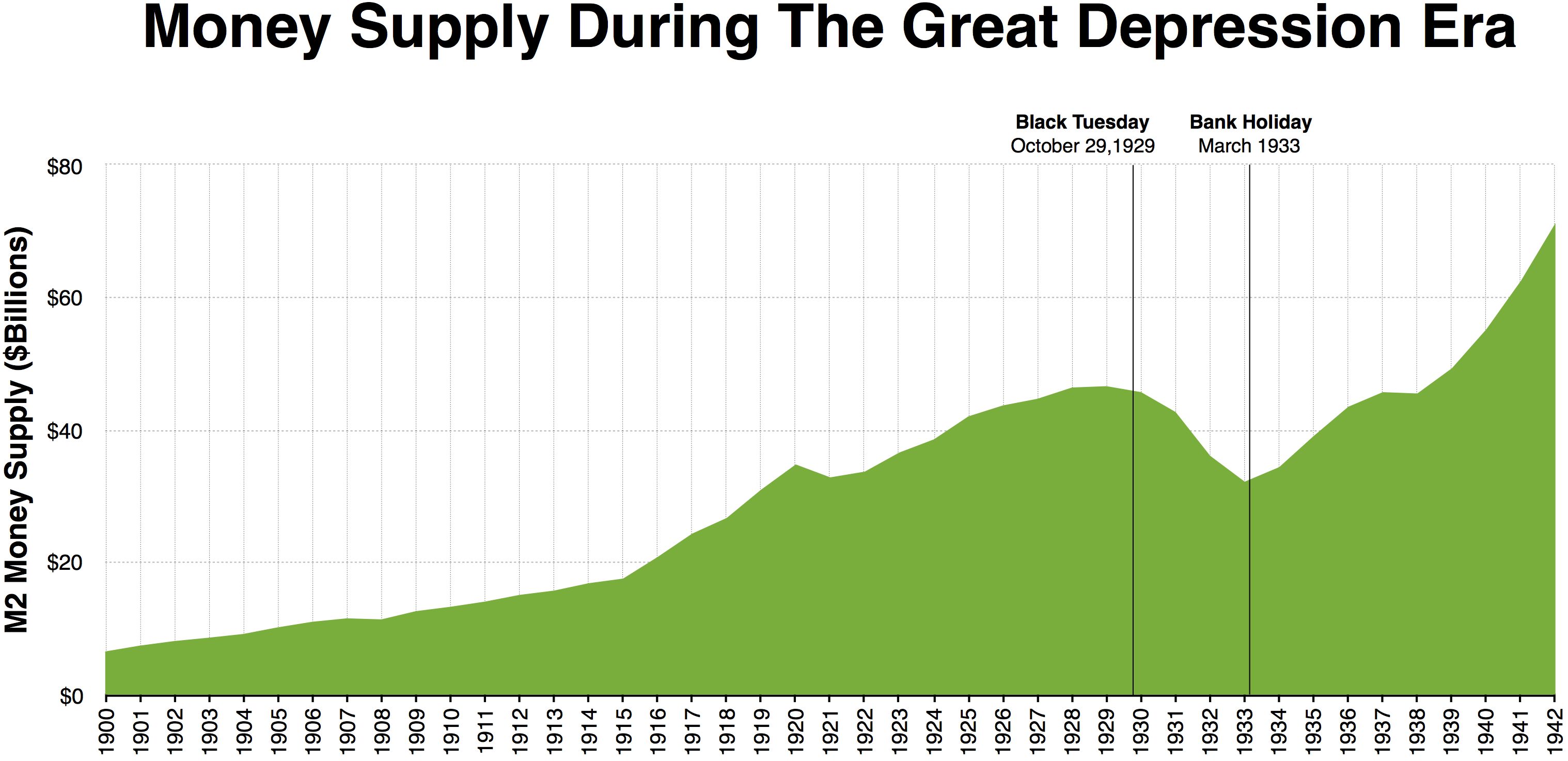
Money supply decreased significantly between Black Tuesday and the Bank Holiday in March 1933 when there were massive bank runs across the United States.

== See also ==
- Farm Credit System
- Fed model
- Federal Reserve Police
- Federal Reserve Statistical Release
- Free banking
- Greenspan put
- History of Federal Open Market Committee actions
- History of central banking in the United States
- Independent Treasury
- Legal Tender Cases
- List of economic reports by U.S. government agencies
- Title 12 of the United States Code
- Title 12 of the Code of Federal Regulations
- United States Consumer Price Index
- United States Bullion Depository‍—‌known as Fort Knox
- List of central banks
- List of financial supervisory authorities by country

== Bibliography ==
=== Recent ===
- Sarah Binder & Mark Spindel. 2017. The Myth of Independence: How Congress Governs the Federal Reserve. Princeton University Press.
- Board of Governors of the Federal Reserve System (2005). The Federal Reserve System: Purposes and Functions (PDF). Archived from the original (PDF) on January 11, 2014.
- Board of Governors of the Federal Reserve System (2006). The Federal Reserve in Plain English. from the St. Louis Fed
- Congressional Research Service Changing the Federal Reserve's Mandate: An Economic Analysis
- Congressional Research Service Federal Reserve: Unconventional Monetary Policy Options
- Conti-Brown, Peter. The Power and Independence of the Federal Reserve (Princeton University Press, 2016).
- Epstein, Lita & Martin, Preston (2003). The Complete Idiot's Guide to the Federal Reserve. Alpha Books. ISBN 0-02-864323-2.
- Greider, William (1987). Secrets of the Temple. Simon & Schuster. ISBN 0-671-67556-7; nontechnical book explaining the structures, functions, and history of the Federal Reserve, focusing specifically on the tenure of Paul Volcker.
- Hafer, R. W. The Federal Reserve System: An Encyclopedia. Greenwood Press, 2005. 451 pp, 280 entries; ISBN 0-313-32839-0.
- Lavelle, Kathryn C. (2013) Money and Banks in the American Political System. New York: Cambridge University Press. 978-1-107-60916-7 Explains basic political processes surrounding the Federal Reserve in the broader system of Congress and the Executive Branch.
- Meyer, Laurence H. (2004). A Term at the Fed: An Insider's View. HarperBusiness. ISBN 0-06-054270-5; focuses on the period from 1996 to 2002, emphasizing Alan Greenspan's chairmanship during the 1997 Asian financial crisis, the stock market boom and the financial aftermath of the September 11, 2001, attacks.
- Woodward, Bob. Maestro: Greenspan's Fed and the American Boom (2000) study of Greenspan in the 1990s.

=== Historical ===
- Broz, J. Lawrence (1997). The International Origins of the Federal Reserve System. Cornell University Press. ISBN 9780801433320.
- Carosso, Vincent P. (1973). "The Wall Street Trust from Pujo through Medina". Business History Review. 47: 421–437. doi:10.2307/3113365. JSTOR 3113365. S2CID 154895813.
- Chandler, Lester V. (1971). American Monetary Policy, 1928–1941. Harper & Row. ISBN 9780060412272.
- Epstein, Gerald; Ferguson, Thomas (December 1984). "Monetary Policy, Loan Liquidation and Industrial Conflict: Federal Reserve System Open Market Operations in 1932". Journal of Economic History. 44: 957–984. doi:10.1017/S0022050700033040. S2CID 154187176.
- Friedman, Milton; Schwartz, Anna Jacobson (1963). A Monetary History of the United States, 1867–1960. Princeton University Press.
- Hetzel, Robert L. (2022). The Federal Reserve: A New History. Chicago: University of Chicago Press. doi:10.7208/chicago/9780226821665.001.0001. ISBN 978-0-226-82166-5.
- Kubik, Paul J. (1996). "Federal Reserve Policy during the Great Depression: The Impact of Interwar Attitudes regarding Consumption and Consumer Credit". Journal of Economic Issues. 30 (3): 829–842. doi:10.1080/00213624.1996.11505838.
- Link, Arthur (1956). Wilson: The New Freedom. Princeton University Press. pp. 199–240.
- Livingston, James. Origins of the Federal Reserve System: Money, Class, and Corporate Capitalism, 1890–1913 (1986).
- Lowenstein, Roger (2015). America's Bank: The Epic Struggle to Create the Federal Reserve. Penguin Press. ISBN 978-0143109846.
- Marrs, Jim (2000). "Secrets of Money and the Federal Reserve System". Rule by Secrecy: 64–78.
- Mayhew, Anne. "Ideology and the Great Depression: Monetary History Rewritten". Journal of Economic Issues 17 (June 1983): 353–360.
- Meltzer, Allan H. (2004). A History of the Federal Reserve, Volume 1: 1913–1951. University of Chicago Press. ISBN 978-0-226-51999-9. (cloth) and ISBN 978-0-226-52000-1 (paper).
  - Meltzer, Allan H. (2009). A History of the Federal Reserve, Volume 2: Book 1, 1951–1969. University of Chicago Press. ISBN 978-0-226-52001-8.
  - Meltzer, Allan H. (2009). A History of the Federal Reserve, Volume 2: Book 2, 1969–1985. University of Chicago Press. ISBN 978-0-226-51994-4.
- Mullins, Eustace C. The Secrets of the Federal Reserve, 1952. John McLaughlin. ISBN 0-9656492-1-0.
- Roberts, Priscilla. 'Quis Custodiet Ipsos Custodes?' The Federal Reserve System's Founding Fathers and Allied Finances in the First World War", Business History Review (1998) 72: 585–603.
- Rothbard, Murray (2007). The Case Against the Fed. Ludwig von Mises Institute. ISBN 978-1467934893.
- Shull, Bernard. "The Fourth Branch: The Federal Reserve's Unlikely Rise to Power and Influence" (2005) ISBN 1-56720-624-7.
- Steindl, Frank G. Monetary Interpretations of the Great Depression. (1995).
- Temin, Peter (1976). Did Monetary Forces Cause the Great Depression?. W. W. Norton & Company. ISBN 978-0393092097.
- Wells, Donald R. The Federal Reserve System: A History (2004)
- West, Robert Craig. Banking Reform and the Federal Reserve, 1863–1923 (1977).
- Wicker, Elmus. "A Reconsideration of Federal Reserve Policy during the 1920–1921 Depression", Journal of Economic History (1966) 26: 223–238.
  - Wicker, Elmus. Federal Reserve Monetary Policy, 1917–33. (1966).
  - Wicker, Elmus. The Great Debate on Banking Reform: Nelson Aldrich and the Origins of the Fed Ohio State University Press, 2005.
- Wood, John H. A History of Central Banking in Great Britain and the United States (2005)
- Wueschner, Silvano A. Charting Twentieth-Century Monetary Policy: Herbert Hoover and Benjamin Strong, 1917–1927. Greenwood Press (1999).
