= Commercial bank =

Financial institution that accepts deposits and provides loans

A commercial bank is a financial institution that accepts deposits from the public and provides loans to its clients in order to facilitate their commercial affairs, including transactional and trading activities involving monetary and non-monetary exchanges, while generating profit. In common usage, the term bank generally denotes a commercial bank that is authorized to accept deposits, extend credit, and provide a range of financial services.

A commercial bank is a financial institution that provides wholesale banking to corporations or large or middle-sized businesses, as well as retail banking services to individual customers, distinguishing it from investment banks. Commercial banks include private sector banks and public sector banks. However, central banks function differently from commercial banks, despite a common misconception known as the "bank analogy". Unlike commercial banks, central banks are not primarily focused on generating profits and cannot become insolvent in the same way as commercial banks in a fiat currency system.

== History ==
The name bank derives from the Italian word banco 'desk/bench', used during the Italian Renaissance era by Florentine bankers, who used to carry out their transactions on a desk covered by a green tablecloth. However, traces of banking activity can be found even in ancient times.

In the United States, the term commercial bank was often used to distinguish it from an investment bank due to differences in bank regulation. After the Great Depression, through the Glass–Steagall Act, the U.S. Congress required that commercial banks only engage in banking activities, whereas investment banks were limited to capital market activities. This separation was mostly repealed in 1999 by the Gramm–Leach–Bliley Act.

== Role ==
The general role of commercial banks is to provide financial services to the general public and business, ensuring economic and social stability and sustainable growth of the economy.

In this respect, credit creation is the most significant function of commercial banks. While sanctioning a loan to a customer, they do not provide cash to the borrower. Instead, they open a deposit account from which the borrower can withdraw. In other words, while sanctioning a loan, they automatically create deposits

=== Primary functions ===
- Commercial banks accept various types of deposits from the public especially from its clients, including saving account deposits and fixed deposits. These deposits are returned whenever the customer demands it after a certain time period.
- Commercial banks provide loans and advances of various forms, Such as [overdraft] facility, cash credit, bill discounting, money call, etc. They also give demand and term loans to all types of clients against proper security. They also act as trustees for wills of their customers etc.
- The function of credit creation is generated on the basis of credit and payment intermediary. Commercial banks use the deposits they absorb to make loans. On the basis of check circulation and transfer settlement, the loans are converted into derivative deposits. To a certain extent, the derivative funds of are increased by interval times the original deposits which greatly improves the driving force of commercial banks to serve the economic development.

Regulations

In most countries, commercial banks are heavily regulated and this is typically done by a country's central bank. They will impose a number of conditions on the banks that they regulate such as keeping bank reserves and to maintain minimum capital requirements. They also require some capital.

== Services by product ==
Commercial banks generally provide a number of services to its clients; these can be split into core banking services such as deposits, loans, and other services which are related to payment systems and other financial services.

=== Core products and services ===
- Accepting money on various types of Deposit accounts
- Lending money by overdraft, and loans both secured and unsecured.
- Providing transaction accounts
- Cash management
- Treasury management
- Private equity financing
- Issuing Bank drafts and Bank cheques
- Processing payments via telegraphic transfer, EFTPOS, internet banking, or other payment methods.

=== Other functions ===
Along with core products and services, commercial banks perform several secondary functions. The secondary functions of commercial banks can be divided into agency functions and utility functions.

Agency functions include:

- To collect and clear cheques, dividends, and interest warrant
- To make payments of rent, insurance premium
- To deal in foreign exchange transactions
- To purchase and sell securities
- To act as the trustee, attorney, correspondent and executor
- To accept tax proceeds and tax returns

Utility functions include:

- To provide safe deposit boxes to customers
- To provide money transfer facility
- To issue traveler's cheques
- To act as referees
- To accept various bills for payment: phone bills, gas bills, water bills
- To provide various cards such as credit cards and debit cards

== See also ==
- Assets and Liabilities of Commercial Banks in the United States – Economic data release in the US
- Financial risk management § Commercial and retail banking
- Glass–Steagall legislation – Four provisions of the Banking Act of 1933, separating commercial and investment banking
- Mortgage constant – Capitalization rate for debt; ratio of annual debt service to mortgage principal
- Universal bank – Type of bank
