= Federal Reserve Deposits =

Federal Reserve Deposits, also known as Federal Reserve Accounts, are deposits of gold or, later, Treasury Bills placed by United States banks with the Federal Reserve, the central bank. They are interchangeable with Federal Reserve Notes; both are forms of reserve balances and act as backing for the banks to create their own deposits in the form of loans to customers or to each other.

== History ==
The Federal Reserve (Fed), when founded in 1913, sought to integrate the individual banks in the United States. To this end, they prohibited private bank notes and limited banks to only creating deposits. In 1914, it was opened for business, it had an operating committee. The banks could create deposits (as governed by their reserve ratio) backed by either gold or direct gold deposits at the Fed. Because the Fed offered convertibility between gold and these gold deposits, and they provided the legal means for banks to expand deposits under the reserve ratio, many banks chose to deposit their gold with the Federal Reserve. The advantage of Federal Reserve Deposits over Federal Reserve Notes was that it greatly facilitated interbank lending and check-clearing. This was because Federal Reserve Deposits while being valid money did not exist in paper form, so they were easy to transfer from bank to bank.

These gold deposits would become known as Federal Reserve Deposits and quickly lost their 100% gold backing. During the Fed's inception, the Fed needed only to back gold deposits by 35%. This created a very dangerous situation because if more than 35% of banks demanded their Federal Reserve Deposits as gold, then the Fed would be insolvent. Such a crisis did happen in 1933 and Federal Reserve Deposits (as well as Federal Reserve Notes) lost their gold backing. Foreign governments were still allowed to be on the gold standard and their Federal Reserve Deposits were still redeemable in gold. But these too were only fractionally backed. This inevitably led to another gold run in 1971, led by heavy withdrawals by Switzerland (51 million) and France (191 million). Nixon chose instead of heavily devaluing the dollar against gold, to simply remove the US from the international gold standard.

== Composition ==
As of July 2017, the Federal Reserve's balance sheet shows $2.5 trillion in Federal Reserve Deposits as opposed to $1.5 trillion in Federal Reserve Notes. The largest holders of Federal Reserve Deposits are foreign governments, the Treasury, and mostly private banks in the US. Private citizens and companies are not allowed to hold Federal Reserve Deposits. Both Federal Reserve Deposits and Federal Reserve Notes are recorded as liabilities to the Fed. What the Fed has exchanged these deposits and notes for (gold and mostly t-bills) are recorded as assets to the Fed. To the private banks, the Federal Reserve Deposits are assets. Private banks do have the option to convert Federal Reserve Deposits into Federal Reserve Notes and vice versa, as needed to meet the demands of bank customers.

== Accounting ==
The following are typical accounting entries that help explain how Fed Funds function. A = Assets, E = Equity, and L = Liabilities

During the Fed's inception, the first significant transaction was that a bank would deposit their gold at the Fed. Figure a 1000 dollar deposit.

Private Bank Balance Sheet

  L: Unchanged
  E: Unchanged
  A, Gold: -1000
  A, Federal Reserve Deposits: +1000

Federal Reserve Balance Sheet

  L: +1000 in Federal Reserve Deposits
  E: Unchanged 
  A: +1000 in Gold

The Fed did not back Federal Reserve Deposits 100% with gold though. This is how they would have purchased a t-bill by watering the backing gold depositors.

Federal Reserve Balance Sheet

  L: +1000 in Federal Reserve Deposits
  E: Unchanged
  A: +1000 in T-bills

Because the amount of deposits has increased, while the amount of gold assets have remained the same, gold deposits have been watered down. The bank that sold the t-bill to the Fed would then be credited with a corresponding 1000 Federal Reserve Deposit.

The modern day Fed does not really deal with gold, but the operations remain very similar. Say the Fed purchases 100k in t-bills from a primary dealer.

Federal Reserve Balance Sheet

  L: +100k in Federal Reserve Deposits
  E: Unchanged
  A: +100k in T-bills

The primary dealer bank (only they are authorized to sell T-bills to the Fed) would record their sale as:

Private Bank Balance Sheet

  L: Unchanged
  E: Unchanged
  A, T-bills: -100k
  A, Federal Reserve Deposits: +100k

Say a bank would like to trade 50k of Federal Reserve Deposits for Federal Reserve Notes. The Fed obliges by simply destroy one form of base money and creating another with no net effect on the monetary base:

Federal Reserve Balance Sheet

  L, Federal Reserve Deposits: -50k in Federal Reserve Deposits
  L, Federal Reserve Notes: +50k in Federal Reserve Notes
  E: Unchanged—A: Unchanged

Private Bank Balance Sheet

  L: Unchanged
  E: Unchanged
  A, Federal Reserve Notes: +50k
  A, Federal Reserve Deposits: -50k

== Conflation with popular economic terms ==
Federal Reserve Deposits are frequently misunderstood even by politicians and economists. Below are some comparisons with popular monetary terms to illustrate what Federal Reserve Deposits are and are not.

- M0. This is not a summation of Federal Reserve Deposits. M0 is the amount of paper dollars and coins both in and outside of the banking system. In fact M0 accounts for no Federal Reserve Deposits
- MB. Another false equivocation. The monetary base is the sum of all coin, paper dollars and Federal Reserve Deposits - Treasury holdings.
- M1. M1 is also clearly different. M1 is the amount of M0 outside of the banking system + demand deposits - TT&L deposits (special tax accounts held by the treasury in the private sector).
- Bank Reserves Because bank reserves can constitute paper money as well as Federal Reserve Deposits, it is not an accurate equivocation. If you were to subtract cash/coin reserves from total bank reserves you would get the total amount of Federal Deposits (not counting the Treasury's Federal Reserve Deposits).
- Fed Funds Also are not Federal Reserve Deposits. The Fed defines Fed Funds as loans made by banks to banks which typically have a time period of one day. While the Fed Funds are loans for Federal Reserve Deposits, they are not Federal Reserve Deposits
- Fed Funds Rate The rate by which banks charge each other for overnight loans. Different from Fed Funds, but not Federal Reserve Deposits
- Federal Reserve Accounts A proper and common alternative label for Federal Reserve Deposits
- Bank Deposits Private bank deposits are very different from Federal Reserve Deposits. The former are what banks create and fractionally back with reserves of which constitute either paper dollars or electronic dollars (Federal Reserve Deposits)
- Printing Presses A frequent expression of political writers is to equate an expanding monetary base to the government ramping up the printing presses to print more dollars. An inaccurate expression as most new assets are purchased with fabricated Federal Reserve Deposits and not Federal Reserve Notes.

== See also ==
- Fractional reserve banking
