= Monetary Policy Report to the Congress =

Semiannual report to Congress mandated by the Humphrey–Hawkins Full Employment Act

The Monetary Policy Report to the Congress is a semi-annual report prepared by the Board of Governors of the Federal Reserve and presented to the Congress of the United States. The Chairman of the Board of Governors is called on to offer oral testimony about the report to the Committee on Banking, Housing, and Urban Affairs of the Senate and the Committee on Financial Services to the House of Representatives.

Monetary Policy Reports are mandated by the Humphrey–Hawkins Full Employment Act of 1978, which required the Federal Reserve to formally report on its activities to Congress. The Monetary Policy Reports were previously referred to as Humphrey-Hawkins reports.

The Monetary Policy Report is delivered twice a year, in February and July, and reports the basic state of the United States economy and its financial welfare. Each report contains two sections. The first section summarizes past policy decisions and their predicted economic impact. The second section focuses on recent financial and economic developments.
