= Debt service =

Debt service may refer to:

- Interest payable on debt, especially on government debt
- Debt service ratio
- Debt service coverage ratio
- External debt
- Developing countries' debt
- Credit analysis
- Bureau of the Public Debt
