= Federal Reserve Statistical Release =

Economic data release in the US

Seal of the U.S. Federal Reserve

The Federal Reserve of the United States gathers and publishes specific economic data and releases them as a Federal Reserve Statistical Release.

The main categories include:

- Principal Economic Indicators
- Bank Asset Quality
- Bank Assets and Liabilities
- Bank Structure Data
- Business Finance
- Exchange Rates and International Data
- Flow of Funds Accounts
- Household Finance
- Industrial Activity
- Interest Rates
- Money Stock and Reserve Balances
- Other
