= Humphrey–Hawkins Full Employment Act =

1978 United States law requiring the Federal Reserve to perform certain functions

Full Employment and Balanced Growth Act
- Long title: An Act to translate into practical reality the right of all Americans who are able, willing, and seeking to work to full opportunity for useful paid employment at fair rates of compensation; to assert the responsibility of the Federal Government to use all practicable programs and policies to promote full employment, production, and real income, balanced growth, adequate productivity growth, proper attention to national priorities, and reasonable price stability; to require the President each year to set forth explicit short-term and medium-term economic goals; to achieve a better integration of general and structural economic policies; and to improve the coordination of economic policymaking within the Federal Government.
- Nicknames: Humphrey–Hawkins
- Enacted by: the 95th United States Congress

Citations
- Public law: Pub. L. 95–523
- Statutes at Large: 92 Stat. 1887

Codification
- Acts amended: Employment Act of 1946

Legislative history
- Introduced in the House as H.R. 50 by Augustus F. Hawkins (D–CA) on January 4, 1977; Committee consideration by House Education and Labor, House Rules; Passed the House on March 16, 1978 (257–152); Passed the Senate on October 13, 1978 (70–19) with amendment; House agreed to Senate amendment on October 14, 1978 (56–14 by H.Res. 1446); Signed into law by President Jimmy Carter on October 27, 1978

Major amendments
- None notable, see end of article

The Full Employment and Balanced Growth Act (known informally as the Humphrey–Hawkins Full Employment Act) is an act of legislation by the United States government.

== Impetus and strategy ==
Unemployment and inflation levels began to rise in the early 1970s, reviving fears of an economic recession. In the past, the country's economic policy had been defined by the Employment Act of 1946, which encouraged the federal government to pursue "maximum employment, production, and purchasing power" by cooperation with private enterprise. Some Representatives, dissatisfied with the vague wording of this act, sought to create an amendment that would strengthen and clarify the country's economic policy.

The Act's sponsors embraced a form of Keynesian economics, advocating public intervention to increase economic demand and to secure full employment. Economists in the Carter administration, in particular the Council of Economic Advisers, pushed for an inflation target in the bill. The economists made references to the Phillips curve, arguing that there was a trade-off between unemployment and inflation.

Consistent with Keynesian theory, the Act provides for measures to create public jobs to reduce unemployment, as applied during the Great Depression.

The Act also encouraged the government to develop a sound monetary policy, to minimize inflation, and to push toward full employment by managing the amount and liquidity of currency in circulation.

Overall, the Act sought to formalize and expand Congress's role in the economic policy process, as governed by the Federal Reserve and the President.

== Overview ==
In response to rising unemployment levels in the 1970s, Representative Augustus Hawkins and Senator Hubert Humphrey created the Full Employment and Balanced Growth Act. It was signed into law by President Jimmy Carter on October 27, 1978, and codified as 15 USC § 3101. The Act explicitly instructs the nation to strive toward four ultimate goals: full employment, growth in production, price stability, and balance of trade and budget. By explicitly setting requirements and goals for the federal government to attain, the Act is markedly stronger than its predecessor (an alternate view is that the 1946 Act concentrated on employment, and Humphrey–Hawkins, by specifying four competing and possibly inconsistent goals, de-emphasized full employment as the sole primary national economic goal). In brief, the Act:

- Explicitly states that the federal government will rely primarily on private enterprise to achieve the four goals.
- Instructs the government to take reasonable means to balance the budget.
- Instructs the government to establish a balance of trade, i.e., to avoid trade surpluses or deficits.
- Mandates the Board of Governors of the Federal Reserve to establish a monetary policy that maintains long-run growth, minimizes inflation, and promotes price stability.
- Instructs the Board of Governors of the Federal Reserve to transmit a Monetary Policy Report to the Congress twice a year outlining its monetary policy.
- Requires the President to set numerical goals for the economy of the next fiscal year in the Economic Report of the President and to suggest policies that will achieve these goals.
- Requires the Chairman of the Federal Reserve to connect the monetary policy with the Presidential economic policy.

The Act set specific numerical goals for the President to attain. By 1983, unemployment rates should be not more than 3% for persons aged 20 or over and not more than 4% for persons aged 16 or over, and inflation rates should not be over 4%. By 1988, inflation rates should be 0%. The Act allows Congress to revise these goals over time. (As of 2017 the Federal Reserve has had a target inflation rate of 2%, not 0%. 0% inflation is not considered ideal and can lead to deflation which can hurt the economy.)

If private enterprise appeared not to be meeting these goals, the Act in its original form, though not in its ultimate iteration, expressly allowed the federal government to create a "reservoir of public employment," provided of course that the legislation to establish the "reservoir" managed to become ratified. These jobs would have been required to be in the lower ranges of skill and pay to minimize competition with the private sector.

The Act directly prohibits discrimination on account of sex, religion, race, age, and national origin in any program created under the Act.

== Amendments ==
The language of the Act was amended twice by riders, attached to unrelated or distantly related legislation.

1. May 10, 1979: Public Law 96-10, attached to H.R. 2283, amended the Act to include federal outlays as a proportion of the gross national product when numerical goals are calculated.
2. November 5, 1990: Public Law 101-508, attached to the Pollution Prevention Act, required the Economic Report to the President to be submitted within 20 days after the start of the session of Congress instead of 10 days after the submission of the annual budget.

== See also ==
- Federal Reserve
- Economic policy
- Monetary policy
- Job guarantee
