= Federal investigation into Jerome Powell =

Federal investigation in the United States

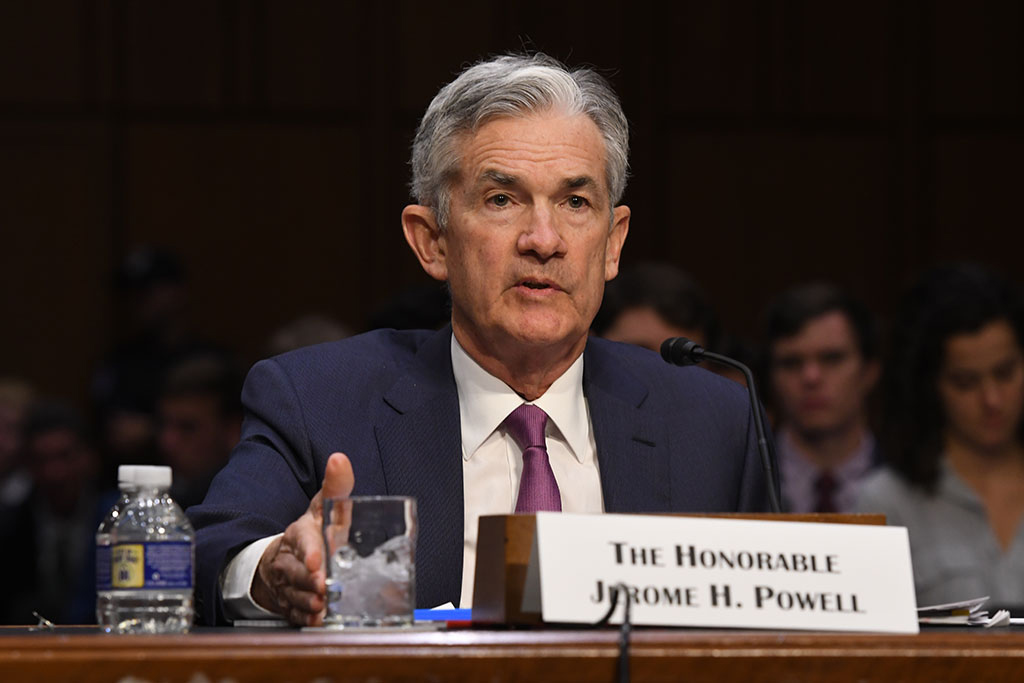
Jerome H. Powell testifying before the U.S. Congress in 2018

In November 2025, federal prosecutors in Washington, D.C., opened a criminal investigation into Jerome H. Powell, the Chair of the Federal Reserve, concerning the renovation of the Federal Reserve’s headquarters and whether Powell made false or misleading statements to Congress about the scope and cost of the project. The inquiry, approved by U.S. Attorney Jeanine Pirro, involves a review of Powell’s congressional testimony and an examination of internal spending and planning records related to the renovation.

The investigation marks a significant escalation in the long-running conflict between President Donald Trump and Powell, whom Trump has repeatedly criticized for resisting pressure to sharply cut interest rates. Trump has publicly accused Powell of “incompetence,” threatened to remove him from office, and raised the prospect of legal action tied to the renovation project. As of April 2026, Powell has not been charged with any crime. The Department of Justice dropped the investigation on April 24, 2026.

== Background ==
Powell was nominated to the Federal Reserve Board of Governors by President Barack Obama in 2011 and was elevated to the position of Chair by President Trump in 2018. He was later reappointed to a second term as chair by President Joe Biden. Powell’s term as chair is scheduled to end in May 2026, though his term as a governor runs through January 2028.

The Federal Reserve is an independent central bank whose authority to set monetary policy is insulated by statute from direct presidential control. Presidents may remove members of the Board of Governors only “for cause,” a standard historically interpreted to require malfeasance or serious dereliction of duty.

Tensions between Trump and Powell intensified as Trump repeatedly demanded large interest-rate cuts and accused the Fed of undermining economic growth, while Powell defended the central bank’s decisions as necessary to control inflation and preserve long-term economic stability.

=== Fed buildings renovation ===
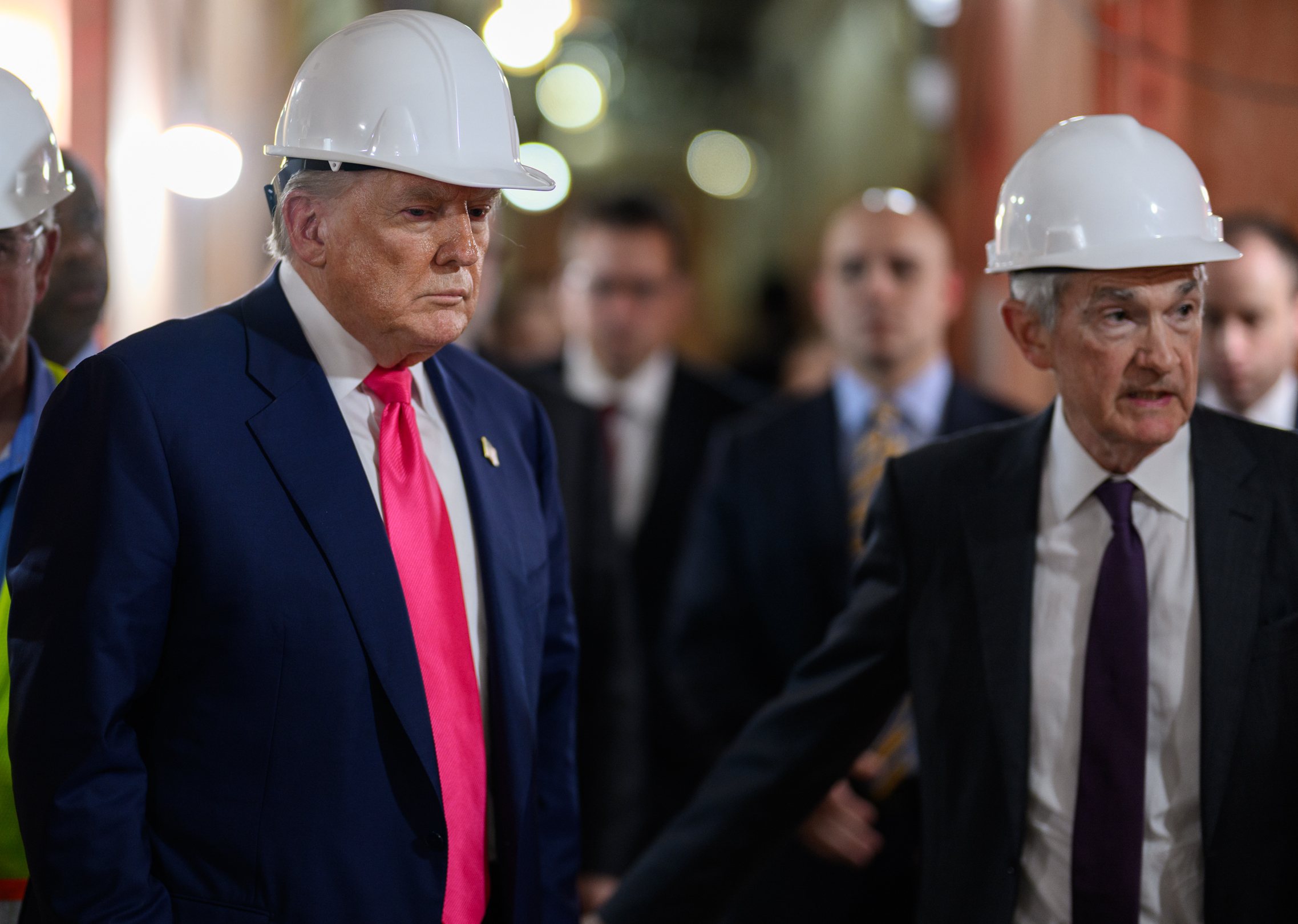
President Trump tours the Federal Reserve alongside Fed Chair Jerome Powell in July 2025.

The renovation project at the center of the investigation involves the modernization of the Eccles Building and the Federal Reserve Board East Building in the District of Columbia. The buildings, constructed in the 1930s, had not undergone a comprehensive renovation in decades. The renovations were approved by the Federal Reserve Board in 2017 and have been subject to annual reviews by the board. Ownership of the East Building was transferred to the Federal Reserve in 2018 by the first Trump administration to allow for the then-vacant building to be renovated and used by the Federal Reserve to reduce its need to lease office space for its staff. The Federal Reserve's inspector general has received monthly reports on the projects and is currently conducting a second review of them at Powell's request after conducting a previous review in 2021. Construction began in 2022 and is scheduled for completion in 2027.

The total projected cost of the renovations have grown to approximately $2.5 billion, and the cost overruns led the Federal Reserve to cancel the renovation of a third building. Federal Reserve officials have cited rising labor and materials costs due to the 2021–2023 inflation surge, 2021–2023 global supply chain crisis, and the second Trump administration's tariffs as contributing to the cost overruns. Also, to bring the buildings up to the District of Columbia's current building code, the buildings required new plumbing, new electrical, HVAC, water, and fire suppression systems, new accessibility features for the disabled (including in one elevator), and the renovation has found higher levels of asbestos and a higher water table than was expected while also finding lead contamination in the ground underneath the buildings (which was not anticipated). Powell and the Federal Reserve have denied that the building designs included dining rooms or elevators for use only by VIPs or Federal Reserve Governors, rooftop terraces, and have asserted that the only proposed water features that had been included in the initial renovation plan for the East Building were eliminated.

Additionally, both the East Building and the Eccles Building are included in the District of Columbia Inventory of Historic Sites while the East Building is also included in the National Register of Historic Places, and some of the cost overruns are due to changes to the design plans to comply with historic preservation laws for maintaining historic buildings and their appearance. The Eccles Building and East Building are also located on the National Mall, and the District's building code has a height restriction that requires that buildings not be taller than the United States Capitol, which required underground construction to expand one of the buildings to include a basement and an addition to the other for greater office space. Due to their location and the historic preservation requirements, the renovations required consultation with the National Capital Planning Commission, the United States Commission of Fine Arts, the District of Columbia Public Space Committee, the District of Columbia Historic Preservation Office, and the National Park Service.

=== Interest rates conflict ===
The investigation unfolded amid broader efforts by the Trump administration to challenge Federal Reserve leadership. In May 2026, Kevin Warsh was sworn in as Powell's successor, although Powell will remain on the Fed until 2028.

Trump has also sought to remove other Federal Reserve officials, including Governor Lisa D. Cook, prompting legal challenges over the scope of presidential authority to dismiss Fed governors. The U.S. Supreme Court heard oral arguments in Trump v. Cook on January 21 to determine whether Trump has the legal authority to remove Cook over mortgage fraud allegations.

Powell stated that the subpoena threat raised fundamental questions about whether the Federal Reserve would be able to continue setting monetary policy based on economic evidence rather than political pressure or intimidation.

== Investigation ==
Statement by Powell about the DOJ investigation

In January 2026, Powell stated that the Department of Justice had served the Federal Reserve with grand jury subpoenas threatening a criminal indictment related to his congressional testimony about the renovation project. According to Powell, the subpoenas were issued on January 10, 2026. As of January 28, the Federal Reserve had reportedly not yet complied with the subpoenas; Powell declined to comment on the investigation at a press conference announcing the Federal Open Market Committee's interest rate decision that month.

The investigation reportedly began in November 2025, and unnamed sources have said that Jeanine Pirro's office issued the subpoenas without contacting the White House, Attorney General Pam Bondi, or Deputy Attorney General Todd Blanche. Pirro has defended the investigation by asserting that the subpoenas were issued because the Federal Reserve did not respond to her office's requests to discuss the cost overruns of the renovation projects, asserting: "This office makes decisions based on the merits, nothing more and nothing less." A Justice Department spokesperson contacted about the investigation stated in a press release that Bondi "has instructed her U.S. Attorneys to prioritize investigating any abuse of taxpayer dollars", while Pirro stated in an interview: "We're talking about $1 billion in cost overruns in DC and something that is purely in my lane as the United States attorney to investigate". However, the Federal Reserve does not receive a congressional appropriation as its budget (including for its building renovations) is instead entirely funded through its open market operations, by interest payments received from banks on loans procured through the Federal Reserve's discount window, and from other fees the Federal Reserve charges banks for other services (including check processing).

Powell characterized the investigation as a pretext aimed at pressuring the Federal Reserve to lower interest rates, rather than a legitimate inquiry into his testimony or the renovation itself. He stated that the Fed had made extensive efforts to keep Congress informed through testimony and public disclosures.

According to reporting, prosecutors reviewed Powell’s public statements and requested documentation from Federal Reserve staff related to the renovation. As of mid-January 2026, it remained unclear whether prosecutors had convened a grand jury beyond issuing subpoenas or whether formal charges would be sought.

In March 2026, Judge James Boasberg ruled to quash Pirro's subpoenas, writing "the government has offered no evidence whatsoever that Powell committed any crime other than displeasing the president.” In a news conference, Pirro said she would appeal the order.

In April 2026, amid pressure from Republican Senators, Pirro announced that the investigation had been closed.

Amid renewed criticism from the Trump administration, Attorney General Todd Blanche affirmed the Department of Justice would not be reopening a criminal investigation into Powell.

=== Congressional testimony ===
In June 2025, Powell testified before Congress regarding the renovation project. Under questioning, he denied that the current plans included luxury features such as VIP dining rooms, special elevators, or new marble installations, stating that existing marble was being reused where possible and that certain earlier proposals had been eliminated as plans evolved.

Following the hearing, the Federal Reserve published a “Frequently Asked Questions” document and released additional materials, including photographs and annotated planning documents, reaffirming Powell’s testimony and explaining changes to the project over time.

Critics argued that Powell’s testimony conflicted with earlier planning documents, raising questions about whether his statements were misleading. Powell has maintained that his answers accurately reflected the project as it existed at the time of his testimony.

In July 2025, U.S. Representative Anna Paulina Luna of Florida made a criminal referral to the Justice Department over Powell's testimony to the Senate Banking Committee the previous month.

== Response ==
=== Central bankers ===
In a joint public statement released the day after Powell announced the subpoenas and investigation, former Federal Reserve Chairs Alan Greenspan, Ben Bernanke, and Janet Yellen, former U.S. Secretaries of the Treasury Henry Paulson, Timothy Geithner, Robert Rubin, and Jacob Lew, economists Glenn Hubbard, Kenneth Rogoff, and Jared Bernstein with others in defense of Powell that argued that the investigation was "an unprecedented attempt to use prosecutorial attacks to undermine [the Federal Reserve's] independence", and that "This is how monetary policy is made in emerging markets with weak institutions, with highly negative consequences for inflation and the functioning of their economies more broadly". In an interview with CNBC, Yellen further condemned the investigation and stated that Trump's demands for the Federal Reserve to cut its interest rates to lower interest payments on the national debt "is the road to a banana republic."

Likewise, New York Federal Reserve Bank President John C. Williams, Chicago Federal Reserve Bank President Austan Goolsbee, Minneapolis Federal Reserve Bank President Neel Kashkari, and Atlanta Federal Reserve Bank President Raphael Bostic publicly criticized the investigation as undermining the Federal Reserve's independence while speaking in defense of Powell's personal character, echoing concerns about potentially higher inflation, and asserting that the investigation is about the central bank's monetary policies rather than the cost overruns of the renovation projects. The day after the former Federal Reserve chairs and Treasury Secretaries issued their joint statement, European Central Bank (ECB) President Christine Lagarde, Bank of England Governor Andrew Bailey, and the executives of the central banks of Canada, Sweden, Denmark, Switzerland, Australia, South Korea, Brazil, and France also issued a joint public statement in defense of Powell that stated: "The independence of central banks is a cornerstone of price, financial and economic stability in the interest of the citizens that we serve. It is therefore critical to preserve that independence, with full respect for the rule of law and democratic accountability."

Bank of Japan Governor Kazuo Ueda reportedly did not sign the joint statement led by Lagarde and Bailey due to not receiving informal approval from the government of Prime Minister Sanae Takaichi in time for the statement's release. Bank of Latvia Governor Mārtiņš Kazāks and former ECB President and Bank of France Governor Jean-Claude Trichet likewise argued that Powell's investigation was comparable to the conduct of monetary policy in emerging markets but that could threaten the stability of the global financial system, while Bank of Finland Governor Olli Rehn warned of a structural rise in the global inflation rate if the Federal Reserve's independence were to be compromised that would likely require monetary policy decisions globally to protect price stability and general economic stability. Nonetheless, ECB Vice President Luis de Guindos stated that central bank liquidity swap lines between the Federal Reserve and the ECB remained "business as usual". International Monetary Fund Director Kristalina Georgieva also spoke in defense of Powell and the Federal Reserve's independence given the role of the United States dollar as the world's reserve currency.

=== Financial markets ===
While futures for the Dow Jones Industrial Average, the Nasdaq-100, and the S&P 500 fell before U.S. stock exchanges opened on the day after Powell's announcement, all three indexes ultimately closed higher at the end of trading on January 12. However, the U.S. Dollar Index showed the dollar falling against other major currencies in the foreign exchange markets, while the price of gold in commodity markets hit a record high, and the yield on the 10-year United States Treasury note rose, and the yield curve between the 2-year and 10-year Treasury notes steepened. The Dow Jones, the Nasdaq, and the S&P 500 saw sell-offs over the next two days with concerns among investors about Federal Reserve independence contributing to the declines, along with news about the Trump administration's response to the 2025–2026 Iranian protests, comments by Trump that Microsoft would make changes to absorb the electricity costs of the data centers used for its artificial intelligence products, as well as Trump's proposed ceiling on credit card interest rates and continued calls for the United States to acquire Greenland.

The dollar weakened further on January 14 after recovering the day before on the release of U.S. Consumer Price Index data, both gold and silver prices hit record highs on both days, while yields on 2-year and 10-year Treasury notes fell despite break-even inflation on the 10-year Treasury note rising on January 13. Despite a rally on January 15 on news of lower unemployment insurance claims, the Dow Jones, the Nasdaq, and the S&P 500 closed just below their opening bell valuations on January 16 and finished the week at a loss upon news that Trump suggested that the most likely candidate to replace Powell as Federal Reserve Chair had changed and threats by Trump to impose import tariffs on countries that oppose the United States acquiring Greenland. Over the same two days, the dollar strengthened, gold prices fell, and yields on 2-year and 10-year Treasury notes rose. As indicated by the weakening of the U.S. dollar on its exchange rates, the precious metals price increases, and the rising yields and steepening yield curve on Treasury notes in the bond market over the week following Powell's announcement, market analysts have observed that the investigation and potential loss of the Federal Reserve's independence (along with the geopolitical risks) indicates higher long-term inflation expectations by investors and has reinforced interest for greater global diversification of investment holdings and away from U.S. assets.

JPMorgan Chase CEO Jamie Dimon and BNY CEO Robin Vince both criticized the investigation, arguing that undermining the Federal Reserve's independence would raise inflation expectations, increase interest rates in the long-term, and undermine the functioning of the bond market. Economists have argued that if the Federal Reserve's independence were to be compromised by the investigation and the central bank were to become more subject to political influence to lower its interest rates, the U.S. economy would likely see lower borrowing costs and higher stock and asset prices in the short-term, but in the long-term would likely see a higher inflation rate, higher interest rates for mortgages and other loans, higher volatility in the stock market, and lower values for stocks, bonds, and other financial assets. The historical example economists cite as a precedent of what would likely occur if the Federal Reserve's independence were to be compromised is the stagflation experienced by the U.S. economy in the 1970s—which culminated in the 1973–1975 recession and the early 1980s recession—as it was caused primarily by President Richard Nixon replacing Federal Reserve Chair William McChesney Martin with Arthur Burns to pressure the central bank to lower its interest rates prior to the 1972 presidential election; economists also cite more recent international examples of runaway inflation and hyperinflation in Argentina, Russia, Turkey, Venezuela, and Zimbabwe.

Fitch Ratings officials have said that erosion of the Federal Reserve's independence will negatively impact the credit rating for government bonds issued by the U.S. Treasury Department, noting that central bank independence is a fundamental factor in determining such ratings for all countries. However, market observers have suggested the pushback from central bankers, professional economists, and congressional Republicans may have led many investors to conclude that the investigation probably will not lead to a long-term shift in the central bank's independence. Powell could remain the Federal Reserve Chair if the United States Senate does not confirm a replacement while Powell's term as a Federal Reserve Governor does not expire until 2028, and some observers have suggested that Powell may choose to serve the entire term to help preserve the central bank's independence—like Federal Reserve Chair Marriner Eccles did after President Harry S. Truman declined to reappoint Eccles as chair in 1948 and led to the Federal Reserve's 1951 Accord with the Treasury Department. Powell has not publicly commented on whether he will do so or not. Additionally, many legal commentators reportedly expect the U.S. Supreme Court to rule against the Trump administration in the lawsuit over the attempted removal of Federal Reserve Governor Lisa Cook in light of a ruling the Court issued the previous year and the oral arguments the Court held on January 21, 2026.

=== Trump administration ===
On the same day of Powell's announcement, Trump denied having any knowledge of the investigation; White House Press Secretary Karoline Leavitt asserted that Trump did not order the Justice Department to investigate Powell. After suggesting at press conferences and social media posting in August and December 2025 that the administration would sue Powell due to the cost overruns, and after Powell announced that he was being targeted with an investigation, Trump said that Powell "either is incompetent or ... crooked" because of the cost overruns, and said that Powell will "be gone soon." However, Trump also said the investigation would not affect the timing of appointing a new Federal Reserve Chair as a successor to Powell. In an interview with Reuters on January 14, Trump said that he has no plans to fire Powell and that it was "too early" to say whether he would have legal grounds to remove Powell.

Trump also dismissed concerns that diminished Federal Reserve independence would lead to higher inflation, asserting that "A president should have something to say" about monetary policy, while criticizing Republican Senators who may oppose his future Federal Reserve nominations due to the investigation, calling them disloyal. Secretary of the Treasury Scott Bessent has reportedly expressed concern that the investigation will cause volatility in the markets. While unnamed sources within the White House have suggested Federal Housing Finance Agency Director Bill Pulte may be behind the investigation of Powell, Pulte has publicly denied the allegations. In July 2025, Pulte called for Powell to be investigated over his testimony to Congress about the cost overruns for the renovation projects, and sent the referral letter to Pam Bondi in August 2025 accusing Lisa Cook of mortgage fraud that led to Trump's attempt to remove Cook from her position and the subsequent litigation over the removal attempt.

=== Congress ===
In response to the investigation announcement, Republican U.S. Senator Thom Tillis, who sits on the Senate Banking Committee, announced that he would oppose any Federal Reserve nomination (including for the vacancy of Powell's seat as chair in May 2026) until the legal matter was resolved, stating: "If there were any remaining doubt whether advisers within the Trump Administration are actively pushing to end the independence of the Federal Reserve, there should now be none. It is now the independence and credibility of the Department of Justice that are in question". Tillis subsequently suggested that he would not support the nomination of National Economic Council Director Kevin Hassett as Federal Reserve Chair to succeed Powell in light of Hassett's past relationship with Trump. Hassett has stated that he is not involved in the investigation, but has stated that he supports it even though he does not expect findings of wrongdoing.

Trump later made comments suggesting he would not appoint Hassett to replace Powell, leading to speculation that former Federal Reserve Governor Kevin Warsh had become the leading candidate rather than Hassett, current Federal Reserve Governor Christopher Waller, or Governor Michelle Bowman. Republican Senator Lisa Murkowski supported Tillis' proposal to block all Federal Reserve nominations in response to the investigation, while Susan Collins expressed concern that the investigation was launched in response to White House demands on the central bank's interest rate decisions. Democratic Senator Elizabeth Warren, the ranking member on the Senate Banking Committee, also expressed support for blocking any future Trump Federal Reserve nominations in response to the investigation. Republican Senators Kevin Cramer, John Kennedy, and Dave McCormick expressed skepticism that Powell was guilty of criminal activity, while House Financial Services Committee Chair French Hill and Republican Senator Roger Marshall criticized the investigation as a distraction. However, Cramer later suggested that Powell should resign to have the investigation dropped and prevent an indictment.

Senate Banking Committee Chair Tim Scott initially provided no comment when asked about the investigation by reporters; Scott presided over the Senate Banking Committee meeting where Powell provided testimony that has become the subject of the perjury investigation. Scott subsequently said that he does not believe Powell perjured himself during his testimony. Senate Majority Leader John Thune called for the investigation to be resolved quickly, for it to not interfere with the Federal Reserve's independence, and asserted that the allegations against Powell "better be real and they better be serious" or otherwise more senators may likewise support blocking future Trump Federal Reserve nominations. Speaker of the House Mike Johnson rejected assertions that the Justice Department was being weaponized in conducting the investigation, expressed no opinion about the allegations, and downplayed concerns that the investigation would undermine the Federal Reserve's independence. Senate Minority Leader Chuck Schumer criticized the investigation for undermining the Federal Reserve's independence and suggested that the investigation was being done to make Powell a scapegoat for public disapproval of Trump's handling of the U.S. economy and the administration's trade policies.

After Trump announced that he would nominate Warsh to replace Powell on January 30, Tillis stated that he will oppose Warsh's nomination until the investigation into Powell is "fully and transparently resolved." Since the Senate Banking Committee's composition currently includes 13 Republicans and 11 Democrats, Tillis has the ability to block the committee from voting to advance Warsh's nomination to a full Senate confirmation vote. John Thune has said that Warsh will "probably not" be confirmed without support from Tillis. On February 4, Tillis, who is not seeking reelection in 2026, subsequently said that he will block Warsh's nomination for the remainder of the 119th United States Congress if the investigation continues until his term expires in January 2027, while the day before, Senate Democrats sitting on the Banking Committee called for a delay to the nomination until both the Powell investigation and the investigation of Lisa Cook were both ended. Tillis stated the previous September that he would not consider any replacement for Cook until the litigation was resolved.

== See also ==
- Legal affairs of the second Trump presidency
- Trump v. Cook (2025)
- Unitary executive theory
