= Lisa Cook =

American economist (born 1964)

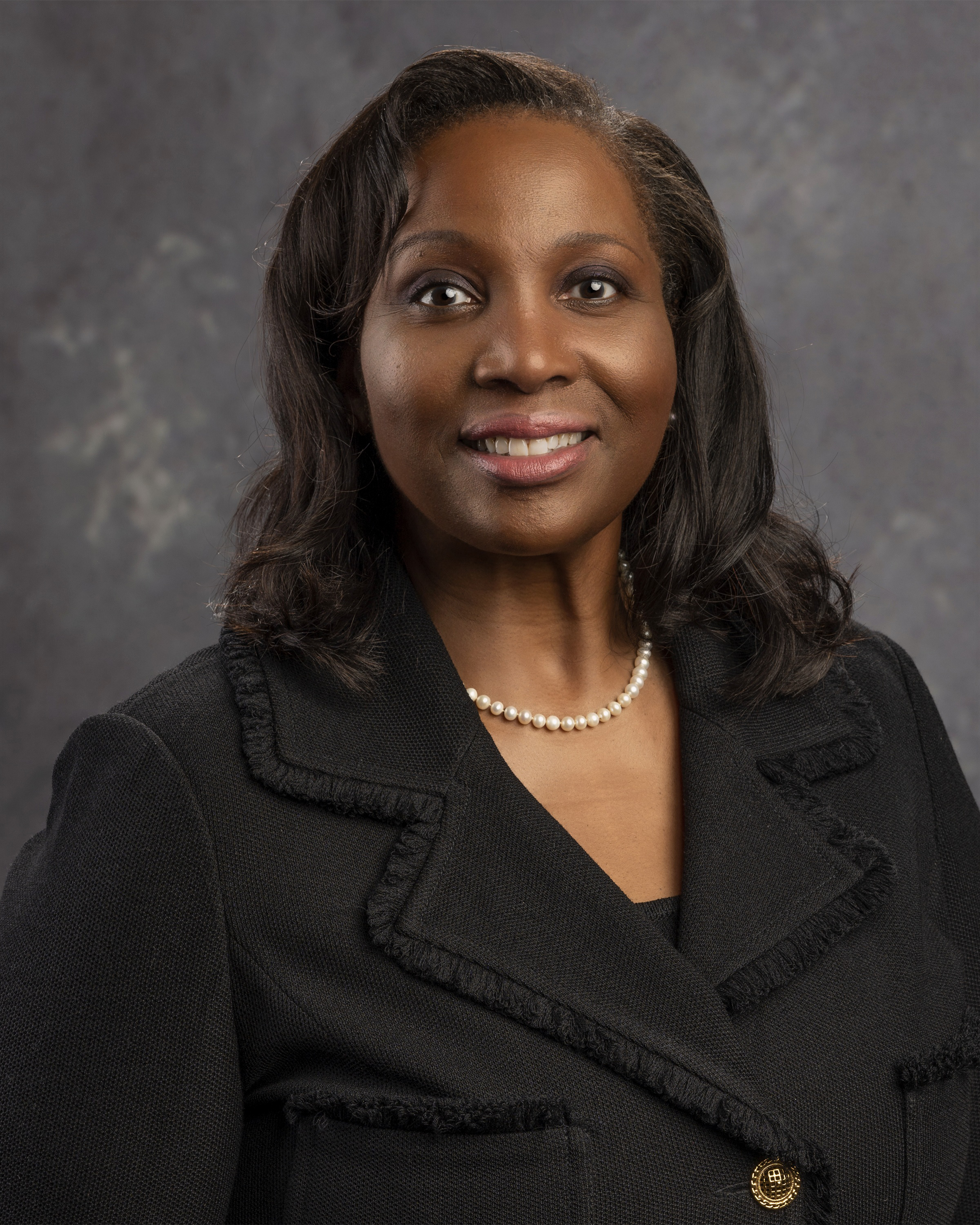
- Official portrait, 2022

Member of the Federal Reserve Board of Governors
- Incumbent
- Assumed office May 23, 2022; Disputed: August 25, 2025 – June 29, 2026 (Note: President Trump attempted to fire Cook on August 25, 2025; However, SCOTUS overturned the firing in Trump v. Cook on June 29, 2026.)
- President: Joe Biden; Donald Trump
- Preceded by: Janet Yellen

Personal details
- Born: Lisa DeNell Cook; 1964 (age 61–62)
- Education: Spelman College (BA); St Hilda's College, Oxford (BA); Cheikh Anta Diop University (MA); University of California, Berkeley (PhD)
- Awards: Truman Scholar (1984); Marshall Scholar (1986)
- Website: Official website

Academic background
- Doctoral advisor: Barry Eichengreen; David Romer

Academic work
- Discipline: Macroeconomics; Economic history
- Institutions: Michigan State University

Lisa DeNell Cook (born 1964) is an American economist who was sworn in as a member of the Federal Reserve Board of Governors in 2022. She is the first black woman to sit on the board. Before her appointment to the Federal Reserve Board, she was elected in January 2022 to the board of directors of the Federal Reserve Bank of Chicago. She was also a research associate at the National Bureau of Economic Research.

Cook was previously a professor of economics and international relations at Michigan State University and a member of the American Economic Association's Executive Committee. An authority on international economics, especially the Russian economy, she has been involved in advising policymakers from the Obama Administration to the Nigerian and Rwandan governments. Her research is at the intersection of macroeconomics and economic history, with recent work in African-American history and innovation economics. Cook is regarded as one of the few prominent black female economists and has attracted attention within academia for her efforts in mentoring black women and advocating for their inclusion in the field of economics.

On January 14, 2022, Joe Biden nominated Cook to serve as Federal Reserve governor; she was confirmed by the U.S. Senate on May 10 after a 50–50 vote was broken by a tie breaker vote by Kamala Harris, and took office on May 23, 2022.

On August 15, 2025, Federal Housing Finance Agency director Bill Pulte accused Cook of committing mortgage fraud, and sent a referral letter to Attorney General Pam Bondi regarding the matter, encouraging that an investigation be launched by the Department of Justice. In September 2025, U.S. Pardon Attorney Ed Martin started a Department of Justice criminal investigation of Cook over allegations of mortgage fraud. However, on September 12, Reuters published an analysis of "loan [and] job-vetting forms" submitted by Cook, as well as property records, which directly contradict the Trump administration's allegations against her.

On August 25, 2025, President Donald Trump announced that he was removing Cook from the Federal Reserve Board of Governors, citing alleged "deceitful and potentially criminal conduct". Federal law allows governors to be removed only "for cause", a provision intended to protect the central bank’s independence. Cook disputed the allegations and filed suit in federal court, arguing that her dismissal was unlawful and politically motivated. As litigation proceeded, she remained legally considered an active governor, pending a judicial ruling on whether the president had authority to remove her. On June 29, 2026, the U.S. Supreme Court found Cook's firing to be unconstitutional.

== Early life and education ==
Cook was born in 1964, one of three daughters of Baptist hospital chaplain Payton B. Cook and Georgia College professor of nursing Mary Murray Cook. She was raised in Milledgeville, Georgia. As a child, she was involved in desegregating schools in Georgia, and still has physical scars from being attacked by segregationists when she enrolled in a formerly white school. She is a cousin of chemist Percy Julian, the first African American to head a major corporate laboratory.

She attended Spelman College, where she was named a Harry S. Truman Scholar, and graduated magna cum laude in physics and philosophy in 1986. She proceeded to St Hilda's College, Oxford, as Spelman's first Marshall Scholar where she earned another B.A. in philosophy, politics and economics in 1988. She took courses towards a master's degree in philosophy at Cheikh Anta Diop University in Senegal. After a mountain climbing trip on Mount Kilimanjaro with an economist, Cook began to seriously consider pursuing a PhD in economics. She temporarily used a wheelchair due to a car accident, when she entered graduate school. Cook earned a PhD in economics from the University of California, Berkeley, in 1997 under the guidance of Barry Eichengreen and David Romer. Her dissertation focused on the underdevelopment of the banking system in czarist and post-Soviet Russia.

== Career ==
Cook was a visiting assistant professor at the Kennedy School of Government at Harvard University and Harvard Business School from 1997 to 2002, where she was deputy director of Africa Research at Harvard's Center for International Development. From 2000 to 2001, she was a senior advisor on finance and development at the U.S. Treasury Department as a Council on Foreign Relations International Affairs Fellow. She was a National Fellow and Research Fellow at the Hoover Institution of Stanford University from 2002 to 2005. Cook advised the Nigerian government on its banking reforms in 2005, and the government of Rwanda on economic development. In 2005, Cook joined Michigan State University as an assistant professor, becoming a tenured associate professor in 2013. She served as a Senior Economist in the Obama Administration's Council of Economic Advisers from August 2011 to August 2012.

Early in her career, Cook's research focused on international economics, particularly the Russian economy. Later she has broadened her research on economic growth to focus on the economic history of African Americans. Her research suggested that violence against African Americans under the Jim Crow laws led to a lower-than-expected number of actual patents filed. Together with other economists, she has collated a long-running database on lynching in the United States.

From 2016 to 2020, she directed the American Economic Association's Summer Program for underrepresented minority students. She became a member of the American Economic Association's Executive Committee in 2019.

In November 2020, Cook was named a volunteer member of the Joe Biden presidential transition Agency Review Team to support transition efforts related to the Federal Reserve.

== Federal Reserve Board of Governors (2021–present) ==
=== Tenure ===
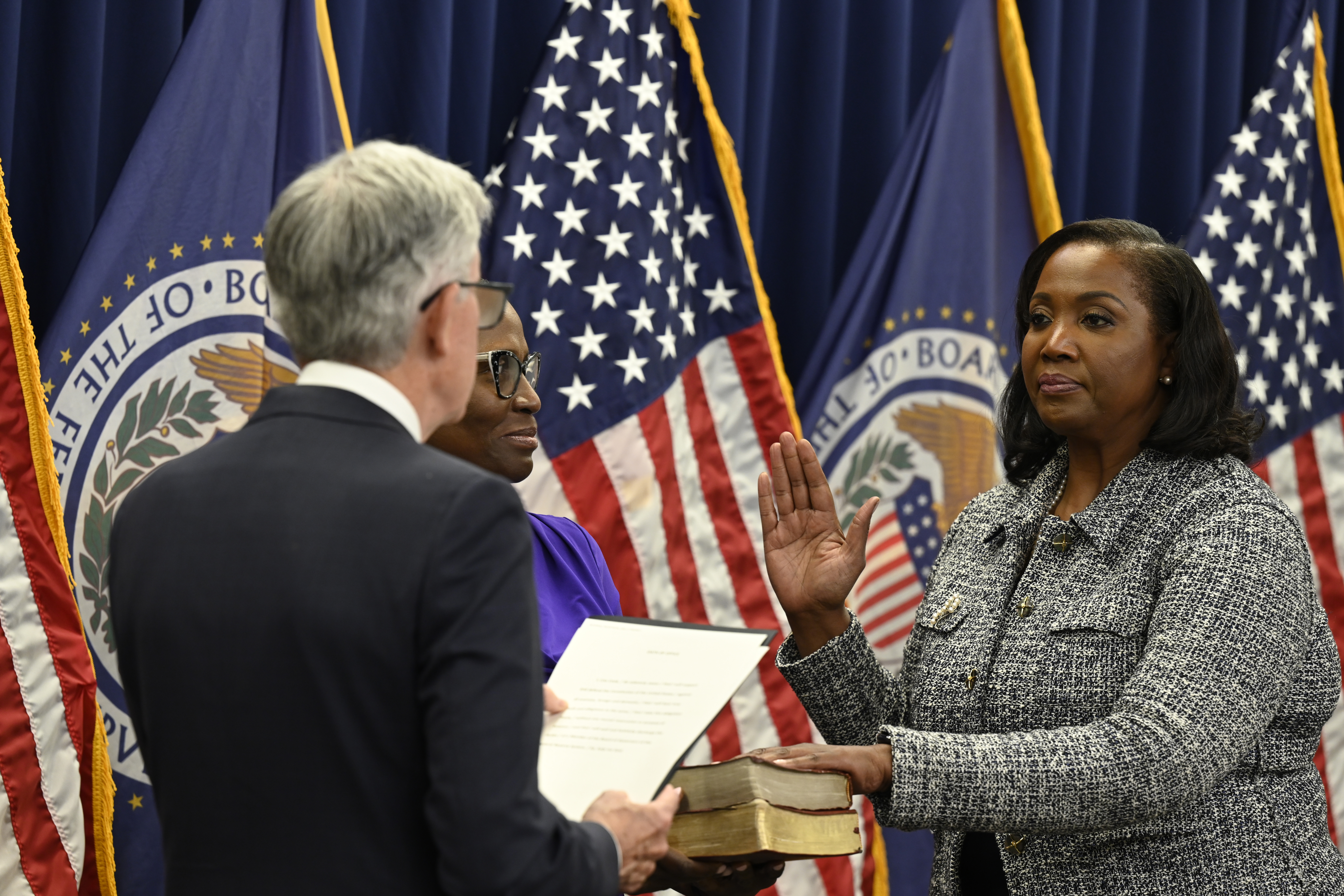
Cook sworn in as a member of the Federal Reserve Board of Governors by Jerome Powell in May 2022

In 2021, Senator Sherrod Brown reportedly pushed the Biden administration to nominate Cook to serve on the Federal Reserve Board of Governors. President Biden officially nominated Cook to be a member of the Board of Governors on January 14, 2022. She is the first black woman on the Federal Reserve's board.

Hearings were held on Cook's nomination before the Senate Banking Committee on February 3, 2022. On March 16, 2022, the committee deadlocked on Cook's nomination in a party-line vote, forcing the entire Senate to move to discharge her nomination out of the committee. On March 29, 2022, the United States Senate discharged her nomination from the Senate Banking Committee by a 50–49 vote. On April 26, 2022, the Senate attempted to invoke cloture on her nomination, but it was not agreed to by a 47–51 vote because senators Chris Murphy and Ron Wyden contracted COVID-19 and were unable to vote. No Senate Republican voted for her, characterizing her as unqualified and a left-wing extremist. On May 10, 2022, the Senate confirmed her nomination by a 51–50 vote, with Vice President Kamala Harris casting the tie-breaking vote, after cloture was invoked on her nomination by a 50–49 vote.

In May 2023, Biden nominated Cook for a full 14-year term. Her nomination was confirmed by the Senate on September 6, 2023, by a 51–47 vote.

==== Fraud allegations and attempted firing ====
On August 15, 2025, Federal Housing Finance Agency (FHFA) director Bill Pulte accused Cook of mortgage fraud, saying she had claimed two different homes as her main residence in 2021 to get better loan terms. Pulte said he submitted a criminal referral to the Department of Justice. The accusations involved multiple properties: one located in Michigan and the other in Georgia (both of which were allegedly claimed as primary residences), and a third property in Massachusetts which was claimed as a second home.

Pulte had already made similar accusations against two other political adversaries of President Donald Trump, namely New York attorney general Letitia James and Senator Adam Schiff. During a CNBC interview on September 4, 2025, Pulte was questioned by journalist Andrew Ross Sorkin about perceptions of "political weaponization." Sorkin stated that "If, for example, the tip came from inside the administration, or came from even inside your agency, with somebody who works for you ... then that creates the perception issue". Pulte refused to clarify if the tip about alleged mortgage fraud had come from within the government or from the general public. Pulte also refused to comment when asked if his agency would be reviewing the records of Republican Ken Paxton, the attorney general of Texas, who has declared three separate Texas homes as primary residences in mortgage documents, according to reporting by The New York Times. A week later, 24 members of the House Democratic Caucus requested that the FHFA inspector general review the process by which Pulte received the tip and made the allegations.

On August 20, Trump posted on Truth Social calling for Cook's resignation. Later that day, Cook rejected the demand, saying she would not be pressured to leave her post over "some questions raised in a tweet" and promised "to take any questions about [her] financial history seriously as a member of the Federal Reserve".

On August 25, President Trump announced that he fired Cook, ostensibly for cause, because of the allegations. In a response, Cook said "President Trump purported to fire me 'for cause' when no cause exists under the law, and he has no authority to do so." Cook's attorney, Abbe Lowell, said that: "President Trump has taken to social media to once again 'fire by tweet' and once again his reflex to bully is flawed and his demands lack any proper process, basis or legal authority ... We will take whatever actions are needed to prevent his attempted illegal action". In the Federal Reserve's 112 years of operation, the attempted firing of Cook is the first time a president has attempted to fire a governor.

On August 28, Cook filed a lawsuit against President Trump over the decision to fire her arguing that the White House has no authority to order the dismissal.

On September 2, an open letter signed by 593 economists and several Nobel laureates was released; it defended Federal Reserve independence and warned that firing Cook would erode trust in "one of America's most important institutions", stating in part that "Good economic policy requires credible monetary institutions. Credible monetary institutions, in turn, require the independence of the Federal Reserve." On September 3, U.S. senators Mike Rounds and Thom Tillis stated in interviews that they would not consider any replacement for Cook until the litigation was resolved.

On September 9, Judge Jia M. Cobb from the U.S. District Court for the District of Columbia temporarily blocked the president from removing Lisa Cook from the board of governors. The ruling states that the president's justifications for removing Cook are not meeting the threshold for sufficient cause. One part of the line of reasoning for the ruling is that the action of the loan application was prior to tenure as a Federal Reserve governor. Based on this decision, Cook will be able to vote in the next Federal Reserve meeting.

On September 12, Reuters published an analysis of "loan [and] job-vetting forms" submitted by Cook, which multiple legal and financial experts say completely refute or dramatically weaken the claims of mortgage fraud. The documents reviewed by Reuters show "that Cook had declared the property [in Georgia] as a 'vacation home'" rather than a principal residence as claimed by Trump administration officials; they include both a loan estimate document submitted to her mortgage lender, as well as the SF-86 document submitted by U.S. government officials during background checks. Reuters also noted that "standard federal mortgage paperwork" specifically allows for exceptions from the use of mortgaged properties as primary residence, if agreed in writing. Property records also showed that Cook never sought a primary residence tax exemption in Georgia. On September 13, "lawyers for Ms. Cook referenced the newly unearthed documents in urging a panel of judges to allow her to continue serving". On November 18, Cook's attorneys sent a letter to Attorney General Pam Bondi in response to the Pulte's criminal referral that argued the claims were "baseless".

On September 15, the U.S. Court of Appeals for the District of Columbia Circuit upheld the September 9 ruling from the U.S. District Court for the District of Columbia. This ruling allowed Cook to vote at the September 16 Federal Open Market Committee meeting the day after the ruling. The same day, Reuters reported that a request made to the tax assessor of Ann Arbor, Michigan did not reveal any violation of primary residence rules related to tax exemptions for Cook's property in the city. On September 18, the Trump administration petitioned the U.S. Supreme Court with an emergency appeal to lift the lower court rulings.

On October 1, the Supreme Court rejected an immediate decision and allowed Cook to remain in her position until her case is decided. On January 21 of 2026, the Supreme Court heard oral arguments for the case. A key concern with justices was the independence of the Federal Reserve Board of Governors if the governors can be removed by the president when the president is motivated by setting interest rates to the rate he or she wants the rates to be. Justice Kavanaugh had stated that, "Once these tools are unleashed, they are used by both sides.” He also gave the warning that, “We have to be aware of what we’re doing and the consequences of your position for the structure of the government".

On June 29, 2026, the U.S. Supreme Court, in a 5-4 ruling, found Cook's firing to be unconstitutional during the litigation.

In early August 2026, a month after the Supreme Court ruling, the White House notified Cook that Trump was "considering" firing her and gave her three weeks to respond. On October 9, 2026, Trump announced the creation of a committee to recommend if he has cause to fire Cook.

== Selected works ==
- Cook, Lisa D. "Trade credit and bank finance: Financing small firms in Russia." Journal of Business venturing 14, no. 5-6 (1999): 493–518.
- Cook, Lisa D. "Violence and economic activity: evidence from African American patents, 1870–1940." Journal of Economic Growth 19, no. 2 (2014): 221–257.
- Atkins, Rachel, Lisa Cook, and Robert Seamans. "Discrimination in lending? Evidence from the paycheck protection program." Small Business Economics 58.2 (2022): 843-865.
- Cook, Lisa D. and Jeffrey Sachs. "Regional public goods in international assistance." Kaul et al., Global public goods: international cooperation in the 21st century (1999): 436–449.
- Cook, Lisa D., Maggie EC Jones, Trevon D. Logan, and David Rosé. "The evolution of access to public accommodations in the United States." The Quarterly Journal of Economics 138, no. 1 (2023): 37-102.
- Cook, Lisa D., Trevon D. Logan, and John M. Parman. "Distinctively black names in the American past." Explorations in Economic History 53 (2014): 64–82.

Government offices
Preceded by Janet Yellen	Member of the Federal Reserve Board of Governors; 2022–present Disputed since 2025	Incumbent
