= Trump v. Cook =

2025 United States lawsuit

- Supreme Court of the United States

Argued January 21, 2026 Decided June 29, 2026
- Full case name: Donald J. Trump, President of the United States v. Lisa D. Cook, Member of the Board of Governors of the Federal Reserve System, et al.
- Docket no.: 25A312
- Citations: 609 U.S. ____ (2026) (more)
- Argument: Oral argument
- Opinion announcement: Opinion announcement

Case history
- Prior: United States District Court (D.D.C.): Cook v. Trump, No. 25-cv-2903 (Sept. 9, 2025) United States Court of Appeals (D.C. Cir.): Cook v. Trump, No. 25-5326 (Sept. 15, 2025)

Holding
- The Federal Reserve historically has independence from presidential control, and the organic statute gives the Governor a set term in office and permits removal only "for cause." Thus, the statute entitles the Governor to notice and some opportunity to respond before they may be terminated by the President.

Court membership
- Chief Justice John Roberts Associate Justices Clarence Thomas · Samuel Alito; Sonia Sotomayor · Elena Kagan; Neil Gorsuch · Brett Kavanaugh; Amy Coney Barrett · Ketanji Brown Jackson

Case opinions
- Majority: Roberts, joined by Sotomayor, Kagan, Kavanaugh, Jackson
- Concurrence: Kavanaugh
- Concurrence: Jackson
- Dissent: Thomas
- Dissent: Alito, joined by Gorsuch
- Dissent: Barrett

Donald J. Trump v. Lisa D. Cook et al. is a lawsuit brought by Lisa Cook, a member of the Federal Reserve Board of Governors, against President Donald Trump, the board, and its chairman, Jerome Powell. Cook contended that her attempted "for cause" removal by President Trump was not for cause, and that the President had in any event failed to comply with constitutional and statutory processes.

On September 9, 2025, District of Columbia U.S. District Court Judge Jia Cobb issued a preliminary injunction preventing the firing of Cook, stating that "the Court finds that Cook has made a strong showing that her purported removal was done in violation of the Federal Reserve Act's 'for cause' provision." On September 15, the United States Court of Appeals for the District of Columbia Circuit rejected an emergency appeal by the Trump administration to remove Cook before the September 2025 meeting of the Federal Open Market Committee. On October 1, the Supreme Court rejected an emergency appeal filed by the Trump administration to remove Cook. Oral arguments were held in January 2026. On June 29, 2026, the Supreme Court denied the government's application and held that Cook could remain in her job while President Trump's efforts to remove her were litigated.

== Background ==
=== Removal of Lisa Cook ===
In January 2021, then-President Joe Biden nominated Lisa Cook to serve on the Federal Reserve Board of Governors. She was confirmed in May 2022. As a member of the board, Cook has consistently voted with its chairman, Jerome Powell, particularly in deciding to stay interest rates in the aftermath of the 2021–2023 inflation surge.

On August 15, 2025, Federal Housing Finance Agency director Bill Pulte accused Cook of mortgage fraud, saying based on documents obtained by the agency, she claimed two different homes as her primary residence in 2021 to get better loan terms. Pulte said he submitted a criminal referral to the Department of Justice. Pulte had already made similar accusations against two other political adversaries of President Donald Trump, namely New York Attorney General Letitia James and Senator Adam Schiff.

On August 20, Trump called for Cook's resignation on Truth Social. Later that day, Cook rejected the demand, saying she would not be pressured to leave her post over "some questions raised in a tweet" and promised "to take any questions about [her] financial history seriously as a member of the Federal Reserve".

On August 25, President Trump announced that he fired Cook because of the mortgage fraud allegations. In a response, Cook said "President Trump purported to fire me 'for cause' when no cause exists under the law, and he has no authority to do so." Cook's attorney, Abbe Lowell, said that: "President Trump has taken to social media to once again 'fire by tweet' and once again his reflex to bully is flawed and his demands lack any proper process, basis or legal authority ... We will take whatever actions are needed to prevent his attempted illegal action". In the Federal Reserve's 112 years of operation, the attempted firing of Cook is the first time a president has attempted to fire a governor. The New York Times called Cook's case "a landmark legal battle" that "will have far-reaching consequences", and predicted that it was ultimately bound for the Supreme Court.

During a CNBC interview on September 4, Pulte was questioned by journalist Andrew Ross Sorkin about perceptions of "political weaponization". Sorkin stated that: "If, for example, the tip came from inside the administration, or came from even inside your agency, with somebody who works for you ... then that creates the perception issue". Pulte refused to clarify if the tip about alleged mortgage fraud had come from within the government or from the general public. Pulte also refused to comment when asked if his agency would be reviewing the records of Republican Ken Paxton, the attorney general of Texas, who has declared three separate Texas homes as primary residences in mortgage documents, according to reporting by The New York Times. Multiple members of Trump's second cabinet have also held dual primary residence mortgages.

On September 12, Reuters published an analysis of "loan [and] job-vetting forms" that were submitted by Cook in 2021, stating that the declarations made in both documents "appear to undercut fraud claims". A loan estimate submitted for Cook's Atlanta home shows that she had "declared the property as a 'vacation home' ", rather than a principal residence. Cook's national security clearance form (SF-86), submitted during the hiring process for her role at the Federal Reserve, shows that she had "declared the Atlanta property as a '2nd home.' " Property records reviewed by Reuters also revealed that Cook never sought a primary residence tax exemption in Georgia. These documents were independently verified by The Washington Post and the Financial Times, with the Post additionally noting that "Cook's financial disclosure forms indicate she has a loan against a property in Atlanta with an interest rate of 3.25 percent, which was slightly higher than prevailing rates for a primary residence at the time she took on the mortgage." The New York Times wrote that the documents "appear to add to the uncertainty" regarding accusations made by the Trump administration, raising "the possibility that Ms. Cook did not try to deceive lenders about one of the properties when she purchased it before joining the board of the nation's central bank in 2022." On September 15, Reuters reported that a request made to the tax assessor of Ann Arbor, Michigan did not reveal any violation of primary residence rules related to tax exemptions for Cook's property in the city.

=== "For cause" removal ===
The Federal Reserve Act allows a president to remove a member of the Federal Reserve Board of Governors for cause, an ambiguous term. Prior interpretations of "for cause" statutes involve inefficiency, neglect of duty, or malfeasance.

On September 2, 2025, an open letter signed by 593 economists and several Nobel laureates was released; it defended Federal Reserve independence and warned that firing Cook would erode trust in "one of America's most important institutions", stating in part that "Good economic policy requires credible monetary institutions. Credible monetary institutions, in turn, require the independence of the Federal Reserve." The letter, addressed to President Trump, Congress, and the American public, additionally argued against undue political influences, remarking that "protection [of Fed governors] is not merely a legal formality; it is a practical mechanism, designed to ensure that monetary policy cannot be misused for political gain at the expense of what's best for the economy."

== Lower courts ==
On August 28, 2025, Cook sued Trump, the Board of Governors, and Jerome Powell in the United States District Court for the District of Columbia, arguing that Trump lacked authority to dismiss her. She requested that a judge issue a preliminary injunction to retain her position and "A declaration that President Trump's August 25, 2025 purported firing of Governor Cook is unlawful and void and that Governor Cook remains an active member of the Board of Governors of the Federal Reserve". Bloomberg News described the lawsuit as the beginning of "a historic fight" over the Federal Reserve's independence. Hours later, Judge Jia M. Cobb scheduled an initial hearing on the injunction for the following day.

At the hearing on August 29, Cook's legal team accused the administration of waging "an obvious smear campaign" and making "vague, unsubstantiated allegations". The plaintiff requested a temporary restraining order. Judge Cobb did not make a ruling on the request at this hearing.

On September 9, federal Judge Jia Cobb issued a preliminary injunction that blocks President Trump from removing Lisa Cook from her position at the Federal Reserve while the case proceeds in court. Cobb wrote that the "for cause" clause "does not contemplate removing an individual purely for conduct that occurred before they began in office". Cook's lawyer, Abbe Lowell, released a statement, saying in part that the ruling "recognizes and reaffirms the importance of safeguarding the independence of the Federal Reserve from illegal political interference" and that "Governor Cook will continue to carry out her sworn duties as a Senate-confirmed Board Governor" for the time being. In the same week, the Trump administration filed an emergency motion for appeal with the United States Court of Appeals for the District of Columbia Circuit.

On September 15, the D.C. Circuit ruled that the President could not terminate Cook before the Federal Open Market Committee's September 2025 meeting in a 2 to 1 decision. On September 18, the Trump administration petitioned the Supreme Court with an emergency appeal to lift the lower court rulings. On September 25, an amicus brief in the case urging the Supreme Court to block Trump's firing of Cook was signed by:

- Former Federal Reserve Chairs Alan Greenspan, Ben Bernanke, and Janet Yellen, former Federal Reserve Governor Daniel Tarullo
- Former Secretaries of the Treasury Robert Rubin, Lawrence Summers, Henry Paulson, Timothy Geithner, and Jack Lew
- Former Chairs of the Council of Economic Advisers Glenn Hubbard, Greg Mankiw, Christina Romer, Jason Furman, Cecilia Rouse, and Jared Bernstein
- Former Senate Banking Committee Chair Phil Gramm
- Economists John H. Cochrane and Kenneth Rogoff.

== Supreme Court ==
On October 1, 2025, the Supreme Court denied an emergency request from Trump to remove Cook immediately, deciding to consider the issue after oral argument in January. On November 12, 2025, the Court scheduled oral arguments for January 21, 2026. Former U.S. solicitor general Paul Clement represented Cook at the Supreme Court, while the current solicitor general D. John Sauer defended the administration's position.

Multiple legal commentators suggested that the Supreme Court appeared unlikely to uphold Trump's attempted removal of Cook. Chief Justice John Roberts and Justice Sonia Sotomayor questioned the grounds and timing of the allegations. Justice Amy Coney Barrett questioned the lack of a hearing for Cook to respond to the mortgage fraud allegations. Justice Ketanji Brown Jackson questioned the lack of factual basis for removal. Justice Brett Kavanaugh raised the concern that allowing a president to remove a Federal Reserve governor without limitations on cause could "weaken, if not shatter, the independence of the Federal Reserve."

Federal Reserve Chair Jerome Powell attended the oral arguments, which took place ten days after Powell announced that he had been issued a subpoena in an investigation of cost overruns incurred during renovations of Federal Reserve buildings. Powell called Lisa Cook's Supreme Court proceedings "perhaps the most important legal case in the Fed's 113-year history".

On June 29, 2026, the Supreme Court ruled in favor of Lisa Cook: by a vote of 5–4, the court held that Cook could continue to remain in her job while her challenge to Trump's efforts to fire her moved forward.

== Ongoing efforts to fire Cook ==
In early August 2026, a month after the Supreme Court ruling, the White House notified Cook that Trump was "considering" firing her and gave her three weeks to respond.

== See also ==
- Appointments Clause
- Central bank independence
- Executive aggrandizement in democratic backsliding
- Federal investigation into Jerome Powell
- Humphrey's Executor v. United States (1935)
- Independent agencies of the United States federal government
- Legal affairs of the second Trump presidency
- Officer of the United States
- Quasi-corporation
- Seila Law LLC v. Consumer Financial Protection Bureau (2020)
- Trump v. Slaughter (2025)
- Unitary executive theory

== Works cited ==
- Matt Grossman & Brian Schwartz, Trump Considers Firing Fed Official After Accusation of Mortgage Fraud, The Wall Street Journal (August 20, 2025).
- Erik Larson & Chris Dolmetsch, Can Trump Really Fire Fed Governor Cook? Here’s What the Law Says, Bloomberg News (August 28, 2025).
- Tony Romm, et al., Trump Demands a Fed Governor Resign, Escalating Campaign to Remake Central Bank, The New York Times (August 20, 2025).
- Tony Romm, et al., Fed Governor Lisa Cook Sues Trump Over Dismissal, The New York Times (August 28, 2025).
- Tony Romm, Judge Jia M. Cobb has scheduled an initial hearing for Friday in the lawsuit brought by Lisa Cook to remain as governor on the Federal Reserve Board., The New York Times (August 28, 2025).
- Jeanna Smialek, White House Taps Two Economists for Top Fed Jobs, The New York Times (May 12, 2023).
- Lydia Wheeler, Fed Governor Lisa Cook Sues to Stop Trump From Firing Her, The Wall Street Journal (August 28, 2025).

=== Further reading ===
- Tsang, Linda; Cole, Jared P. (September 25, 2017). Privatization and the Constitution: Selected Legal Issues (PDF) (Report). Congressional Research Service.
- Labonte, Marc (January 6, 2025). Introduction to Financial Services: The Federal Reserve (PDF) (Report). Congressional Research Service.
- Barczewski, Benjamin M.; Garvey, Todd (June 4, 2025). Supreme Court Grants Emergency Motion on President's Removal Power (PDF) (Report). Congressional Research Service.
- Leubsdorf, Ben (August 14, 2025). Federal Reserve Board: Current and Historical Membership (PDF) (Report). Congressional Research Service.
