= Bill Pulte =

American businessman and government official (born 1988)

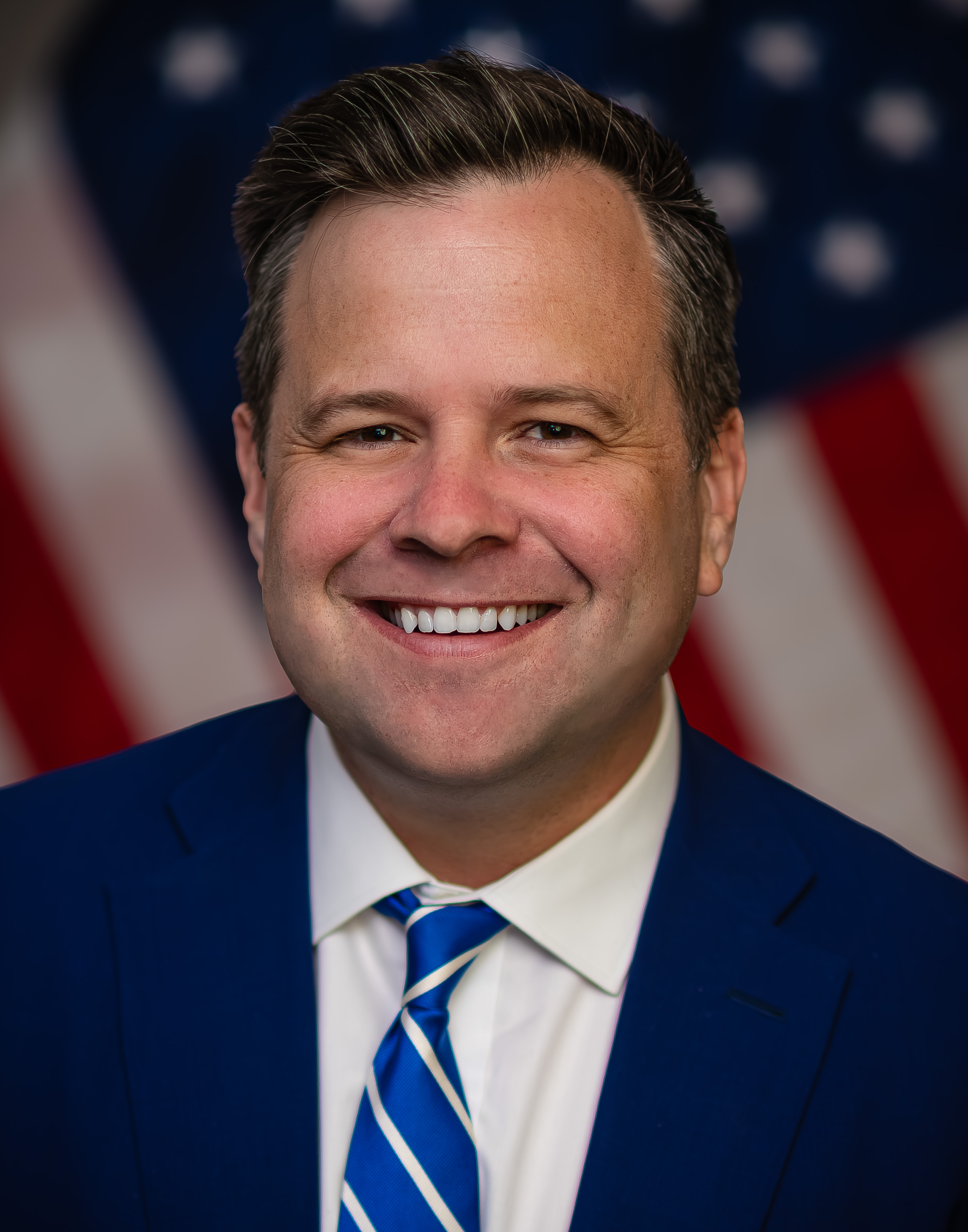
- Official portrait, 2025

Director of the Federal Housing Finance Agency
- Incumbent
- Assumed office March 14, 2025
- President: Donald Trump
- Preceded by: Sandra L. Thompson

Acting Director of National Intelligence
- In office June 19, 2026 – August 3, 2026
- President: Donald Trump
- Deputy: Aaron Lukas
- Preceded by: Tulsi Gabbard
- Succeeded by: Jay Clayton

Personal details
- Born: William John Pulte; May 28, 1988 (age 38) Boynton Beach, Florida, U.S.
- Relatives: William J. Pulte (grandfather)
- Education: Northwestern University (BA)

William John Pulte (born May 28, 1988) is an American businessman who has served as the director of the Federal Housing Finance Agency (FHFA) and the chairman of Fannie Mae and Freddie Mac since 2025. Pulte served as the acting director of national intelligence from June to August 2026.

Pulte is the grandson of William J. Pulte, founder of PulteGroup, a residential home construction company. He studied broadcast journalism at Northwestern University. Pulte founded Pulte Capital in 2011, a private equity firm, and founded The Blight Authority, a nonprofit that clears empty homes, in 2015. Amid a leadership dispute, Pulte was named to PulteGroup's board in 2016, serving for a four-year term; he was not retained over a dispute between him and the board. In 2019, Pulte began using Twitter as a platform for philanthropic efforts.

In January 2025, President-elect Donald Trump named Pulte as his nominee for director of the FHFA. He was confirmed by the Senate in March. He marked his tenure by appointing himself chairman of Fannie Mae and Freddie Mac. Beginning in April, Pulte began accusing Trump foes of mortgage fraud, including Letitia James, the attorney general of New York; California senator Adam Schiff; Federal Reserve Board of Governors member Lisa Cook; and Federal Reserve chairman Jerome Powell. The accusations against Cook, which she denied, led to Trump attempting to remove her and a lawsuit.

In June 2026, Trump named Pulte as the acting director of national intelligence to succeed Tulsi Gabbard. His appointment elicited concern from some senators, who noted Pulte's loyalty to Trump and his lack of experience in national intelligence. As the acting director of national intelligence, Pulte claimed that he had fired approximately thirty percent of the Office of the Director of National Intelligence's workforce. He left the position in August.

== Early life and education (1988–2010) ==
William John Pulte was born on May 28, 1988, at Bethesda Memorial Hospital in Boynton Beach, Florida. He was the first son of Noreen and Mark Pulte; (Note: Mark and Julie had five children after Pulte.) Mark later married Julie. Pulte's grandfather was William J. Pulte, the founder of PulteGroup, a residential home construction company. In high school, Pulte worked for a construction company. He graduated from Northwestern University with a bachelor's degree in broadcast journalism, where he was the president of his university's chapter of Pi Kappa Alpha, in 2010. He started an aerial photography business during his time at the university. At Northwestern University, Pulte met his wife, a chemical engineer.

== Career ==
=== Private equity (2010–2016) ===
After graduating from Northwestern University, Pulte interned for Huron Capital Partners and later worked for Penske Capital Partners. He founded investment firm, Pulte Capital, in 2011. The company had two hundred employees and US$30 million in revenue by 2014. That year, he was named to the Forbes 30 Under 30 list.

=== PulteGroup (2016–2020) ===
In March 2016, William J. Pulte began a campaign to remove PulteGroup's chief executive, Richard Dugas Jr. Dugas announced that he would resign the following month amid pressure from Pulte, his grandson, and Jim Grosfeld. The younger Pulte was appointed to the board in September, becoming one of the youngest board members of a Fortune 500 company. Following the elder Pulte's death in 2018, he was the only descendant to receive an inheritance, according to a lawsuit. Pulte remained on the board until 2020. According to The New York Times, Pulte was ousted after many of PulteGroup's board members were displeased by Pulte's acquisition of Pulte-related domain names and his use of the @pulte Twitter handle, believing that he no longer needed to remain with the company after the death of his grandfather. During his tenure, he successfully blocked chief executive Ryan Marshall's proposal to promote Brandon Jones, the Michigan division president, to chief operating officer. Pulte sued Jones in December 2022, claiming that he had been subject to harassment on Twitter.

=== Philanthropy and nonprofit work (2013–2025) ===
By 2013, Pulte had founded the Detroit Blight Authority, a nonprofit that clears empty homes and cleans up trash, leaving empty lots. After Mike Duggan was inaugurated as the mayor of Detroit in January 2014, he requested that Pulte halt his efforts. Pulte since founded The Blight Authority, a nonprofit operating in Pontiac, Michigan, and—at the behest of Twitter chief executive Jack Dorsey—St. Louis. In November 2018, Pontiac mayor Deirdre Waterman stated that her city was set to be blight-free by the following year.

In 2019, Pulte began using Twitter as a platform for philanthropic efforts. According to Pulte, he was inspired during a summer vacation by Andrew Yang's pledge to give US$1,000 per month. He has referred to himself as the "inventor of Twitter philanthropy." Pulte's posts often involve giveaways in which recipients must follow him, as well as promotional posts for GoFundMe campaigns. By August, he had established a team of ten people to work through charity requests. Pulte brought attention to GoFundMe campaigns established for victims of the Oxford High School shooting and the Uvalde school shooting. By December 2022, he had garnered 3.2 million followers.

=== Political activities ===
Avatar of Donald J. Trump

Donald J. Trump
Twitter
@realDonaldTrump

Thank you Bill, say hello to our GREAT VETERANS!

July 31, 2019

Avatar of Bill Pulte

Bill Pulte
Twitter
@pulte

If @realDonaldTrump retweets this, my team and I will give Two Beautiful Cars to Two Beautiful Veterans on Twitter. @DanScavino

July 31, 2019

In July 2019, President Donald Trump praised Pulte for promising to give two cars to two veterans if Trump retweeted the post. Pulte told The Detroit News in 2019 that he had met Trump several times and that Trump was familiar with the Blight Authority. Pulte and his wife contributed $500,000 to a pro-Trump PAC through an LLC he controlled in 2021. In 2024, Pulte contributed "heavily" to Republican causes, including donating to the Republican National Committee and Trump's presidential campaign.

=== Assets ===
Pulte estimated his net worth to be US$100 million in an interview with the Detroit Free Press in December 2021. He disclosed at least US$190 million in assets to the Office of Government Ethics in February 2025, including a US$5 million stake in Beast Industries, the conglomerate company for the YouTuber MrBeast, and holdings in GameStop and MARA Holdings, companies that became meme stocks. Pulte stated that he would recuse himself from matters involving companies he was financially involved with, as opposed to divesting his assets. In 2023, Pulte championed the stock of company Bed, Bath, and Beyond following the bankruptcy of the company and before the stocks were extinguished, leaving holders of the stock at a total loss despite Pulte's suggestion its value would rebound.

== Director of the Federal Housing Finance Agency (2025–present) ==
=== Nomination and confirmation ===
According to The Wall Street Journal, Pulte sought to become President-elect Donald Trump's nominee to serve as the secretary of housing and urban development; the position later went to Scott Turner. On January 16, 2025, one day after his inauguration, Trump named Pulte as his nominee for director of the Federal Housing Finance Agency (FHFA). Pulte appeared before the Senate Committee on Banking, Housing, and Urban Affairs on February 20, in which he advocated for lowering housing costs and constructing more homes. The committee voted to advance his nomination in a 15–9 vote on March 6. Pulte was confirmed by the Senate in a 56–43 vote on March 13. Every Republican senator and Democratic senators Elissa Slotkin of Michigan, Angela Alsobrooks of Maryland, and Ruben Gallego of Arizona voted to confirm him; Illinois senator Tammy Duckworth did not vote.

=== Initial tenure ===
Pulte was sworn in as the director of the Federal Housing Finance Agency on March 14. He marked his tenure by assuming control of Fannie Mae and Freddie Mac, removing eight members and six members from the boards of each, respectively. Pulte appointed himself the chairman of both boards and appointed three other members. In a departure from the Federal Housing Finance Agency's traditional communications strategy, Pulte prolifically used X to document his work at the agency and solicit advice. Pulte indicated that he had rescinded several policies from the Biden administration in a post on X, terminating special‑purpose credit programs and ending the Federal Housing Finance Agency's enforcement of unfair and deceptive acts or practices. He ended a strategy at the Federal Housing Finance Agency that required real-estate owned foreclosed properties to be repaired before they could be sold on the market.

In March 2025, Pulte removed several executives at the agency, at Fannie Mae, and Freddie Mac, including Freddie Mac's chief executive officer and the Federal Housing Finance Agency's chief operating officer. Pulte's comments citing empty offices at Fannie Mae and Freddie Mac as evidence that employees were not returning to work elicited concerns that he would institute mass layoffs. At the Federal Housing Finance Agency, Pulte placed thirty-five unionized workers on administrative leave; according to the National Treasury Employees Union, they were not given advance notice. His job cuts targeted a department that oversaw fair housing rules for the Federal Home Loan Bank system. Pulte's control of Fannie Mae and Freddie Mac occurred as several officials within the Trump administration suggested that the companies could be privatized. Pulte and Secretary of the Treasury Scott Bessent argued publicly that privatization could negatively harm mortgage rates.

In April 2025, several Democratic senators questioned the legality of the board firings at Fannie Mae and Freddie Mac, as well as Pulte's decision-making, in a letter sent to Pulte. In a separate letter, a consortium of Republican senators conversely encouraged Pulte to continue his work. That month, he issued several directives reversing diversity, equity, and inclusion policies that were established in the Biden administration. Pulte claimed to have fired twenty-five percent of the Federal Housing Finance Agency's workforce and alleged that over one hundred employees at Fannie Mae were complicit in "unethical conduct". In a post on X, he stated that the agency would intensify its use of the Suspended Counterparties Program to lessen apparent fraud. In response to Pulte's board dismissals and his firings at Fannie Mae, Democrats on the Senate Committee on Banking, Housing, and Urban Affairs requested an investigation from the Federal Housing Finance Agency's inspector general.

In June 2025, Pulte directed Fannie Mae and Freddie Mac to allow cryptocurrency to be declared as an asset on mortgage applications. That month, he ordered a "full-scale review" of credit bureaus. In July, he allowed mortgage lenders to use VantageScore models in originating loans from Fannie Mae or Freddie Mac. The following month, National Mortgage News reported that Pulte had decreased the number of Federal Home Loan Bank Board seats. In November, Trump and Pulte publicly suggested that Fannie Mae and Freddie Mac could offer fifty-year mortgages, which would have lower monthly principals and interest at the expense of an extended amortization and slower equity. The proposal was criticized by some housing experts as ineffective at resolving the housing affordability crisis. According to Politico, Pulte's suggestion reportedly infuriated some officials in the Trump administration. He signaled that fifty-year mortgages would not proceed in January 2026.

The Washington Post described Pulte's approach at the Federal Housing Finance Agency as having a "Trumpian policy-by-tweet" flourish, accompanied by abrupt and unexpected decision-making. According to The Wall Street Journal, he pursued policy changes without input from others or notice to officials. Pulte's use of X caused indices and stocks of several companies to fluctuate. In April 2025, shares in Fannie Mae and Freddie Mac sharply increased by fourteen percent after Pulte cryptically posted about an imminent announcement, later revealed to be that he had appointed Omeed Malik to Fannie Mae's board of directors. The following month, shares in FICO fell sixteen percent after he questioned the use of its scores; his comments additionally caused shares in the credit bureaus TransUnion and Equifax to fall. The S&P 500 briefly fell in July after he posted that Jerome Powell, the chairman of the Federal Reserve Board of Governors, would resign. Trump and Pulte's posts intensified a homebuilder stock selloff in October.

A report from Bloomberg Intelligence in May 2025 indicated that Pulte's efforts to cut costs at Fannie Mae and Freddie Mac would slow housing recovery. In December, the Federal Housing Finance Agency released a report stating that eliminating the Biden administration's quotas and goals would assist middle-class families in obtaining housing. According to affordable housing advocates, Pulte's actions—including rescinding fair lending guidance documents and firing members of an affordability team at Freddie Mac—broadly worsened housing affordability for low-income buyers. In June 2026, The New York Times characterized Pulte's tenure as having achieved "few tangible results"; Bloomberg News claimed that Pulte had worked against Trump's housing affordability agenda.

In September 2026, Pulte announced funding cuts to the Federal Housing Finance Agency's Office of the Inspector General.

=== Mortgage fraud accusations ===
Seeking to target alleged fraud, Pulte established an email address for reporting mortgage fraud in April 2025. The following month, he stated that Fannie Mae and Freddie Mac would coordinate to combat fraud. In April, a website known as WhiteCollarFraud.com posted an apparent real-estate transaction in which Letitia James, the attorney general of New York, claimed that her primary residence was in Virginia while having a primary residence in New York. The claim was amplified by Trump, who referred to her as a "crook" on Truth Social. The following day, Pulte sent a criminal referral to the Department of Justice, alleging that James may have "falsified records" to achieve favorable loans. In May, The Washington Post reported that the Department of Justice was investigating James. She was indicted and arraigned in October; after Lindsey Halligan's appointment as the acting United States attorney for the Eastern District of Virginia was ruled as illegal the following month, federal prosecutors sought another indictment. Two separate federal grand juries declined to reindict James in December.

In June 2025, Pulte criticized Jerome Powell and called for his resignation. Leveraging his three million followers on X, he continued to urge Powell's resignation in the following weeks, including by sharing a letter using the letterhead of the Federal Housing Finance Agency that baselessly claimed Powell would imminently resign. In July, Pulte alleged that Powell had lied to Congress, a claim that was used by Trump to request Powell's resignation. According to The New York Times, Pulte gave Trump a draft of a letter that would ostensibly fire Powell. The Wall Street Journal later reported that Pulte's comments were purportedly poorly received by some officials in the Trump administration, who believed that the remarks could destabilize the market. He accompanied Trump to a tour of a construction project at the Eccles Building. According to Bloomberg News, Pulte motivated the Department of Justice to subpoena the Federal Reserve in its investigation into Powell.

In July 2025, Trump accused California senator Adam Schiff of mortgage fraud, citing a memorandum from Fannie Mae sent to Pulte; the memorandum did not claim Schiff committed mortgage fraud. The following month, Pulte wrote on X that the Federal Housing Finance Agency had referred Federal Reserve Board of Governors member Lisa Cook to the Department of Justice for alleged mortgage fraud. Trump used the referral to call for Cook to resign. Trump later stated that he had fired Cook for cause, citing the allegations. In response, Cook sued to contest her removal, leading to a case that appeared before the Supreme Court in January 2026. In an interview with CNBC in September, Pulte refused to say if initial tips about Cook's mortgage documents came from an anonymous source or had originated with administration officials. That month, Pulte was involved in the ouster of Erik Siebert, the United States attorney for the Eastern District of Virginia. He advocated for Siebert's removal over claims that Siebert had deliberately delayed investigations into James and James Comey, the former director of the Federal Bureau of Investigation. After federal prosecutors failed to find sufficient evidence to indict James, Trump dismissed Siebert and installed Halligan, the White House senior associate staff secretary, who secured indictments against James and Comey after her appointment. According to The Wall Street Journal, Pulte had also reviewed the mortgage records of Attorney General Todd Blanche, during a time when the two had clashed about inquiries into Trump's political rivals.

=== Associations and inquiries ===
Prior to his accusations against Lisa Cook, Pulte garnered criticism from within the Trump administration as he generated the impression that he was interested in self-promotion and spectacle over policy-making. According to Politico, Pulte's actions elicited discontent from several establishment Republicans. In September, Secretary of the Treasury Scott Bessent allegedly threatened to punch Pulte at the Executive Branch club over alleged disparaging remarks that Pulte had made about Bessent to Trump, a sign of tensions between the two men; Bessent later stated that his conflict with Pulte was a "locker room" fight and that he had specifically said he would "kick his ass". According to The Wall Street Journal, Pulte's involvement in the investigations into Schiff, James, Cook, and Powell reportedly frustrated senior officials at the Department of Justice. The Journal additionally reported that Trump had opposed efforts from administration officials to oust Pulte, citing his loyalty. Pulte assisted Ed Martin, the director of the Weaponization Working Group, in his prosecution of Trump's foes. Through his visits to Mar-a-Lago, Pulte had direct access to Trump. According to Axios, Pulte presented Trump with an image depicting him as Jesus.

Pulte's accusations against several Trump foes led to claims that he was abusing his authority and weaponizing his office for political purposes. In September 2025, six Democratic senators sent a letter to Pulte alleging that he had "abused" his position to seek retribution against Trump's foes. That month, a report from ProPublica suggested that Pulte's owner-occupancy fraud campaign may be politically motivated, citing officials in Trump's cabinet who allegedly had two primary mortgages, including Secretary of Labor Lori Chavez-DeRemer; Secretary of Transportation Sean Duffy; and Lee Zeldin, the administrator of the Environmental Protection Agency. Pulte rejected that his allegations of owner-occupancy fraud were instances of "political weaponization" in an interview with CNBC in September. California representative Robert Garcia, the ranking member of the House Committee on Oversight and Government Reform, sent a letter to Pulte in November accusing him of "abuses of power" and having "politicized" his agency. That month, The Gateway Pundit published an article alleging that California representative Eric Swalwell had listed homes in Washington, D.C., and California as primary residences. According to Reuters, Pulte forwarded the article to Allen's successor and referred the incident to the Department of Justice. In November, Swalwell sued Pulte, accusing him of abuse of power and violating federal privacy laws.

In October 2025, Reuters reported Pulte had allegedly pursued accusations of mortgage fraud without going through Joe Allen, the acting inspector general of the Federal Housing Finance Agency, a possible violation of ethics rules. The following month, The Washington Post reported that Pulte had fired dozens of employees who handled oversight at the Federal National Mortgage Association, in an alleged attempt to prevent investigations into multiple complaints against a high-ranking company officer and Pulte ally. According to The Wall Street Journal, they had additionally initiated an inquiry to determine if Pulte's acquisition of mortgage records was improper, following internal complaints that alleged senior officials at the Federal Housing Finance Agency had "improperly directed staff to access the mortgage documents of James and others". In November 2025, Reuters reported that Trump had fired Allen, as he was preparing to inform Congress that Pulte was not complying with his office. In December, the Government Accountability Office began investigating Pulte over allegations that he had abused his authority at the Federal Housing Finance Agency by investigating Trump foes.

== Acting Director of National Intelligence (June–August 2026) ==
=== Appointment ===
In May 2026, Tulsi Gabbard, the director of national intelligence, announced that she would resign at the end of June after her husband was diagnosed with bone cancer. After her announcement, President Donald Trump announced that Aaron Lukas, the principal deputy director of national intelligence, would succeed her as the acting director of national intelligence. Several Trump allies espoused concerns about Lukas, citing his work in the Obama and Biden administrations, according to CNN. Pulte had previously told Trump that he was seeking a position in his cabinet; after Gabbard announced her resignation, he directly lobbied Trump to appoint him as the acting director of national intelligence. CNN additionally reported that Trump believed Pulte was more kinetic than Gabbard, who was perceived as a deliberate theorist. In discussions with Trump, Pulte indicated that he completely supported Trump's foreign policy, including the Iran war. According to Semafor, Trump was encouraged to appoint Pulte by the political advisor Roger Stone and others within the MAGA movement, who viewed him as likely to push for large-volume declassifications of sensitive information; one source who spoke to Semafor compared Pulte to a "bulldozer". Trump later told The Wall Street Journal that he wanted Pulte to fire employees at the Office of the Director of National Intelligence and that he supported eliminating the agency.

On June 2, 2026, Trump named Pulte as the acting director of national intelligence. Pulte was set to remain as the director of the Federal Housing Finance Agency and the chairman of Fannie Mae and Freddie Mac. According to The Wall Street Journal, Trump's decision surprised many of his advisors. According to CNN, Pulte was not vetted for security vulnerabilities and did not have a security clearance. Trump later stated that he would not nominate Pulte to the position. Pulte's inexperience in intelligence work and his loyalty to Trump led to concerns from some Democrats that he would abuse his authority. His appointment was met with skepticism by some Republican lawmakers, including Texas senator John Cornyn, and some officials in the Trump administration. Senate Majority Leader John Thune told reporters that he was opposed to a "weaponized" director of national intelligence. According to Politico, Pulte's appointment elicited concern from some within the intelligence community. Conversely, his appointment was praised by some within the MAGA movement, including Steve Bannon, who told Politico that it was a "middle finger to the Senate" and a "fuck you to the Deep State".

Pulte's appointment complicated the passage of legislation renewing Section 702 of the Foreign Intelligence Surveillance Act after Virginia senator Mark Warner, the vice chair of the Senate Select Committee on Intelligence, told Thune that Pulte's appointment could threaten a deal to extend the act. A procedural vote necessary to move forward with extension of the act was blocked by Senate Democrats and voted against by a group of seven Senate Republicans. In blocking a renewal of Section 702 a week before it was set to expire, several Democrats cited Pulte's appointment. Three days before the deadline, Speaker of the House Mike Johnson met with Trump at the White House. According to Politico, Trump told Johnson that he would not appease Democrats by nominating a successor to Pulte. Hours later, Trump stated that Pulte would take office on June 19. According to CNN, Trump told allies that Pulte's tenure as the director of national intelligence would be temporary and intended to restructure the Office of the Director of National Intelligence before he nominated a permanent successor. That month, Democrats on the House Permanent Select Committee on Intelligence sent a letter to Trump urging Pulte to submit to security checks.

=== Tenure ===
Pulte was sworn in on June 19, 2026. According to Politico, he requested staffers at the Office of the Director of National Intelligence compile a list of three hundred workers at the National Counterterrorism Center to be fired prior to taking office. Pulte's firings began three days later; by June 23, at least six career and political intelligence staffers had been fired and forty-five were returned to their home agencies, according to CBS News. Hours before Clayton was expected to be confirmed as the director of national intelligence, Pulte claimed that he had fired approximately thirty percent of the Office of the Director of National Intelligence's workforce across five rounds; according to some current and former officials, Pulte had fired far fewer employees than he had claimed. According to Politico, Pulte urged Trump to delay Clayton's swearing in after he was confirmed on July 28. Clayton was sworn in on August 3, ending Pulte's tenure.

== Works cited ==
- Barrett, Devlin (2026). The Department of Revenge: How Trump Took Control of American Justice. New York: Simon & Schuster. ISBN 978-1-6680-6512-9.

Political offices
Preceded by Tulsi Gabbard	Director of National Intelligence; Acting; 2026	Succeeded by Jay Clayton
