= Hurn (surname) =

Hurn is a surname. Notable people with the surname include:

- Ashton Hurn, Australian politician
- Brian Hurn (1939–2015), Australian first-class cricketer
- Christopher Hurn, American writer, entrepreneur, and business executive
- David Hurn (born 1934), British documentary photographer
- James Hurn (1926–2003), English cricketer
- Raymond Hurn (1921–2007), minister and general superintendent in the Church of the Nazarene
- Reba Hurn (1881–1967), lawyer and state legislator
- Shannon Hurn (born 1987), Australian rules footballer

== See also ==
- Hurn, village and civil parish in Hampshire, England
- Hurn v. Oursler, 1933 United States Supreme Court lawsuit
- Yung Hurn (born 1995), Austrian hip-hop-musician
