= William J. Pulte =

American business executive (1932–2018)

- Born: William John Pulte; May 16, 1932; Ann Arbor, Michigan, U.S.
- Died: March 7, 2018 (aged 85); Naples, Florida, U.S.
- Known for: Founder of PulteGroup
- Spouse: Karen Koppal (m. 1993)
- Children: 14
- Relatives: Bill Pulte (grandson)

William John Pulte (May 16, 1932 – March 7, 2018) was the founder and chairman of PulteGroup, one of the largest home construction and real estate development companies in the United States.

== Early life ==
William John Pulte was born on May 16, 1932, in Ann Arbor, Michigan, to Marguerite Hannah (née Lynch) and William Pulte. His father was an insurance adjuster. He attended De La Salle Collegiate School in Detroit. He was a three-sport varsity athlete in football, track and basketball.

== Career ==
In 1950, just after graduating high school, Pulte and five friends built a 5-room bungalow near Detroit City Airport, which they sold for US$10,000.

In 1956, he founded William J. Pulte Inc. In 1959, he built his first subdivision, Concord Green in Bloomfield Hills. In the 1960s, he expanded his company Pulte Homes beyond Michigan into Washington, D.C., Chicago, and Atlanta. He took the company public in 1969. By the 1980s, it was operating in 11 states with revenues of US$294,000,000 and by 1995, it was the largest homebuilder in the United States. It became a Fortune 500 company in 1999. In 2001, the company acquired Del Webb Corporation, a retirement community builder. He retired in 2010.

In 2016, after Richard Dugas Jr., the former chief executive officer of the company, moved the headquarters of the company from Bloomfield Hills, Michigan, to Atlanta and initiated a change in direction for the company, Pulte, who owned 9% of the company at the time, pressured Dugas to resign. Dugas resigned, and the stock price fell 6.57%.

== Philanthropy ==
Pulte was a benefactor of Angel Fund, an organization for struggling families in Detroit. He also donated to Detroit's Cornerstone Schools.

== Personal life ==
Pulte had 14 children. He divorced his first wife, and married Karen Koppal in 1993. Pulte died at his home in Naples, Florida, on March 7, 2018, aged 85. He was Catholic.

On January 16, 2025, President-elect Donald Trump announced that he intended to nominate Pulte's grandson, Bill Pulte, to serve as the next director of the Federal Housing Finance Agency.
