= Robert Seamans (economist) =

American economist

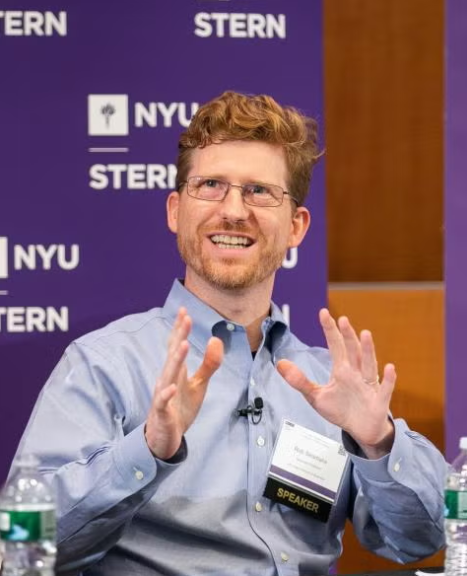

Academic background
- Education: UC Berkeley's Haas School of Business , (Ph.D.); Yale School of Management , (M.A.); Reed College, (B.A.)

Academic work
- Discipline: Microeconomics, labor economics
- Institutions: New York University Stern School of Business

Robert Seamans is an American economist and professor at New York University's Stern School of Business. His research focuses on Business strategy, Entrepreneurship, Public policy and competition policy. He serves as Director of the Center for the Future of Management and Professor of Management and strategy. He also served Senior Economist for Technology and Innovation on the Council of Economic Advisers under President Obama.

== Education and career ==
Seamans earned his B.A. in English from Reed College in 1996, where he wrote a senior thesis on Chaucer's Canterbury Tales, followed by an MBA from Yale School of Management in 2001. He completed an M.A. in economics at Boston University in 2004 and a Ph.D. in business administration at UC Berkeley's Haas School of Business in 2009. His dissertation received UC Berkeley's Best Dissertation in Competition Policy award.

Joining NYU Stern in 2009 as an Assistant Professor of Management, Seamans became Associate Professor in 2015 and granted tenure in 2017. He attained full professorship in 2023. Since 2020, he has directed NYU Stern's Center for the Future of Management and served as Academic Director of the Black in Business Program from 2023 to 2024. He is also serving as professor of economics (by courtesy).

Seamans served as Senior Economist for Technology, Innovation, and Competition Policy on the White House Council of Economic Advisers during the Obama administration from 2015 to 2016. His policy work focused on issues such as artificial intelligence, robotics, broadband access, and technology competition and regulation.

== Research and views ==
Seamans' research examines the economic and strategic implications of emerging technologies. His other studies analyze robotics adoption in manufacturing, competition in two-sided market settings, and discrimination in small business lending.

Seamans has advocated for balanced approaches to technology policy, arguing that while the US need not adopt fully centralized regulation of emerging technologies like artificial intelligence, coordinated government attention to workforce impacts remains critical.

== Personal life ==
Seamans is married and resides with his family in New York.

== Selected publications ==
- Seamans, Robert; Raj, Manav; Felten, Edward W. (2023). "Occupational Heterogeneity in Exposure to Generative AI". SSRN Electronic Journal. doi:10.2139/ssrn.4414065. ISSN 1556-5068.
- Seamans, Robert; Buffington, Catherine; Goldschlag, Nathan; Li, J. Frank; Miranda, Javier; Brynjolfsson, Erik (2023-05-01). "Robot Hubs: The Skewed Distribution of Robots in US Manufacturing". AEA Papers and Proceedings. 113: 215–218. doi:10.1257/pandp.20231038. ISSN 2574-0768.
- Seamans, Robert; Cook, Lisa; Atkins, Rachel (2021-07-05). "Discrimination in lending? Evidence from the Paycheck Protection Program". Small Business Economics. 58 (2): 843–865. doi:10.1007/s11187-021-00533-1. ISSN 0921-898X. PMC 8255164.
- Seamans, Robert; Rietveld, Joost; Meggiorin, Katia (September 2021). "Market Orchestrators: The Effects of Certification on Platforms and Their Complementors". Strategy Science. 6 (3): 244–264. doi:10.1287/stsc.2021.0135. ISSN 2333-2050.
- Seamans, Robert; Furman, Jason (2019). "AI and the Economy". Innovation Policy and the Economy. 19: 161–191. doi:10.1086/699936. ISSN 1531-3468.
- Seamans, Robert C. (2013). "Threat of entry, asymmetric information, and pricing". Strategic Management Journal. 34 (4): 426–444. doi:10.1002/smj.2017. ISSN 1097-0266.
- Seamans, Robert; Zhu, Feng (2017). "Repositioning and Cost-Cutting: The Impact of Competition on Platform Strategies". Strategy Science. 2 (2): 83–99. doi:10.1287/stsc.2017.0027. ISSN 2333-2050.
