= Christopher Hurn =

American writer and businessman

Christopher Hurn is an American writer, entrepreneur, and business executive who works primarily in the field of small business lending. He is the founder and CEO of Fountainhead, a company that provides commercial real estate financing and growth capital for small business owners. He previously founded Mercantile Capital Corporation, a financier of owner-occupied commercial real estate and an Inc. 500 company. He served as CEO of that company prior to leaving in late 2014 to launch Fountainhead.

Hurn is the author of The Entrepreneur's Secret to Creating Wealth: How The Smartest Business Owners Build Their Fortunes, a book that details financing for small business owners. He is also a frequent media commentator, appearing on Fox Business to discuss issues relating to small business, and a regular contributor for The Huffington Post. As an entrepreneur and small business owner, he founded Kennedy's All-American Barber Club which operates stores nationally in the United States.

== Education ==
Hurn graduated from Loyola University Chicago where he earned two bachelor's degrees, magna cum laude. He went on to attend the University of Pennsylvania's Fels Center of Government (Part of the Wharton School of the University of Pennsylvania at the time), earning his M.B.A before a brief stint at Georgetown University Law Center. He left Georgetown early to pursue a career in finance.

== Career ==
Hurn began his career in lending with GE Capital before moving on to Heller Financial. His lending experience led him to become an entrepreneur when he co-founded Mercantile Capital Corporation in 2002. The company specialized in small business loans that are backed by commercial real estate. The company first loaned to businesses in Florida, but expanded beyond the state shortly thereafter. It used the SBA 504 Loan program to help small businesses obtain financing and was listed on the Inc. 500 list at #245 in 2007, on the Inc. 5000 list at #1683 in 2008, and on the Inc. 5000 list at #3,776 in 2009. Mercantile was sold to Old Florida National Bank in 2010, with Old Florida National Bank later being acquired by IBERIABANK. Hurn stayed on as the company's CEO until he left the firm in late 2014.

Hurn authored The Entrepreneur's Secret to Creating Wealth: How The Smartest Business Owners Build Their Fortunes, a financial advice book that he released in October 2012. The book details strategies for small business wealth creation. Inc. editor Bo Burlington stated that the book is "an invaluable guide to a crucial, but often overlooked, aspect of building a business" while Secrets of the Millionaire Mind author T. Harv Eker stated that it was a "hands-on strategy for your own financial freedom." Hurn is also a regular contributor for The Huffington Post.

Hurn founded Fountainhead Commercial Capital in February 2015. The company is a direct lender specializing in SBA 504 and Low LTV (<65%) conventional loans. Fountainhead provides 504 first mortgages as a third party lender and interim second mortgages for acquisition, ground-up construction, and renovations. It is a non-bank, national commercial lender that provides other commercial loan programs in addition to its SBA lending, while also originating loans from banks, nonbank lenders, credit unions and mortgage bankers/brokers through their new secondary market program: FastTrack504. Fountainhead has closed over 12 billion dollars in SBA 504 loans in the last 20 years.

Fountainhead, Hurn's company, was among the first round of Florida's "2018 Companies to Watch".

Hurn is also a small business owner and listed as the principal of numerous businesses, including ATCC Management Group, Kennedy's International Franchising, and SpreheFamily Investments. Kennedy's is a chain of barbershops Kennedy's All-American Barber Club with locations in Florida, Connecticut, and New Jersey, with Hurn operating one of the franchises in Lake Mary, Florida.

Hurn has made numerous media appearances and provided commentary for media outlets that include multiple appearances on Fox Business, PBS NewsHour, The Washington Post, Forbes, The Wall Street Journal , and CNNMoney. He also testified before the United States Senate Committee on Small Business and Entrepreneurship in March 2012. and His work in finance has led to him receiving numerous awards and recognition, some of which include Top Twenty Most Influential People in Small Business Lending, SBA Marketing Guru of the Year, Top 25 Twitter Small Business Experts to Follow, and Top 100 Small Business Influence Champion. Chris Hurn was recently named by American City Business Journals as one of the nation's most influential leaders in commercial real estate. Hurn was additionally named as one of the Top Small Business Influencers of 2018 by Fit Small Business.

He recently was interviewed on the changes in the 504 programs. Hurn is a member of the Young Presidents Organization. He has written the only book on SBA 504 loans and has testified in front of congress several times.

== See also ==
- Commercial property
- Small Business Administration
- Small Business Lending Index
