= Small Business Lending Index =

PayNet economic indicator

The PayNet Small Business Lending Index (SBLI) is an economic indicator from PayNet Inc, An Equifax Company. Because small businesses generally respond to changes in economic conditions more rapidly than larger businesses do, the PayNet Small Business Lending Index serves as a leading indicator of the economy.

The index measures the volume of small business loan activity by major lenders, normalized to a base year- 2005. The index is seasonally adjusted and presented both as an absolute and as a percentage change relative to the previous year.

Each month, the following data are published:

- preliminary data reflecting small business lending activity in the current month;
- revised data for the preceding month;
- finalized data for the month preceding the revised data.

The index has its highest correlation with GDP change as a leading indicator, leading by two to five months. The index undergoes periodic checks to examine the accuracy of the estimates over time.

== Methodology ==
All data is collected by PayNet, Inc. PayNet collects real-time loan information from more than 400 leading U.S. lenders. Its proprietary database encompasses over 27 million current and historic contracts worth over $1.7 trillion.

PayNet primarily collects data from small business lenders in the United States, conducts research and analysis, develops and implements estimation methodologies and disseminates statistics to customers. Because PayNet receives its source data over time, estimates are routinely revised to reflect more complete source data. Preliminary and Revised estimates are reported as calculated without any reference to previously reported estimates for the same month. In addition, PayNet undertakes periodic studies that examine the accuracy of the estimates over time and for the existence of any systemic overstatement or understatement.
