= History of the Federal Reserve System =

The United States Federal Reserve System is the central banking system of the United States. It was created on December 23, 1913.

== Central banking prior to the Federal Reserve ==
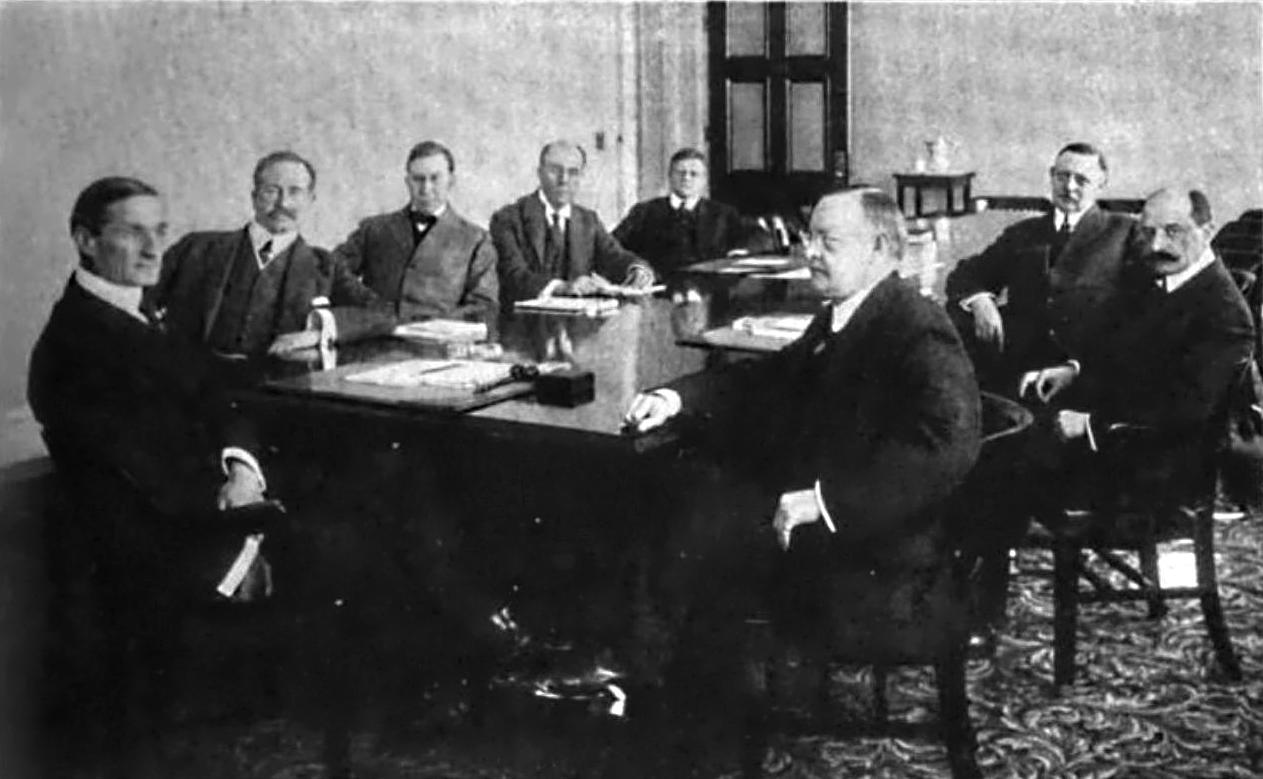
Federal Reserve Board, 1917

The Federal Reserve System is the third central banking system in United States history. The First Bank of the United States (1791–1811) and the Second Bank of the United States (1817–1836) each had a 20-year charter. Both banks issued currency, made commercial loans, accepted deposits, purchased securities, maintained multiple branches and acted as fiscal agents for the U.S. Treasury. The U.S. Federal Government was required to purchase 20% of the bank capital stock shares and to appoint 20% of the board members (directors) of each of those first two banks "of the United States." Therefore, each bank's majority control was placed squarely in the hands of wealthy investors who purchased the remaining 80% of the stock. These banks were opposed by state-chartered banks, who saw them as very large competitors, and by many who insisted that they were in reality banking cartels compelling the common person to maintain and support them. President Andrew Jackson vetoed legislation to renew the Second Bank of the United States, starting a period of free banking. Jackson staked the legislative success of his second presidential term on the issue of central banking. "Every monopoly and all exclusive privileges are granted at the expense of the public, which ought to receive a fair equivalent. The many millions which this act proposes to bestow on the stockholders of the existing bank must come directly or indirectly out of the earnings of the American people," Jackson said in 1832. Jackson's second term in office ended in March 1837 without the Second Bank of the United States' charter being renewed.

In 1863, as a means to help finance the Civil War, a system of national banks was instituted by the National Currency Act. The banks each had the power to issue standardized national bank notes based on United States bonds held by the bank. The Act was totally revised in 1864 and later named the National-Bank Act, or National Banking Act, as it is popularly known. The administration of the new national banking system was vested in the newly created Office of the Comptroller of the Currency and its chief administrator, the Comptroller of the Currency. This federal agency, which still exists today, examines and supervises all banks chartered nationally and is a part of the U.S. Treasury Department.

== The Federal Reserve Act, 1913 ==
National bank currency was considered inelastic because it was based on the fluctuating value of U.S. Treasury bonds. If Treasury bond prices declined, a national bank had to reduce the amount of currency it had in circulation by either refusing to make new loans or by calling in loans it had made already. The related liquidity problem was largely caused by an immobile, pyramidal reserve system, in which nationally chartered rural/agriculture-based banks were required to set aside their reserves in federal reserve city banks, which were required to have reserves in central city banks. Rural banks exploited their reserves during the planting season to finance full plantings. Then, during harvest season, they used profits from loan interest payments to restore and grow their reserves. A national bank whose reserves were being drained would replace them by selling stocks and bonds, borrowing from a clearing house, or calling in loans. With little private deposit insurance and no federal deposit insurance, if a bank was rumored to be having liquidity problems, this might cause many people to withdraw their funds. Because of the crescendo effect (repeated situations of moral distress) of banks that lent more than their assets could cover, the United States economy experienced a series of financial panics during the last quarter of the 19th century and the beginning of the 20th century.

=== The National Monetary Commission, 1907-1913 ===
Prior to a particularly severe panic in 1907, there was a motivation for renewed demands for banking and currency reform. The following year, Congress enacted the Aldrich–Vreeland Act, which provided for an emergency currency and established the National Monetary Commission to study banking and currency reform.

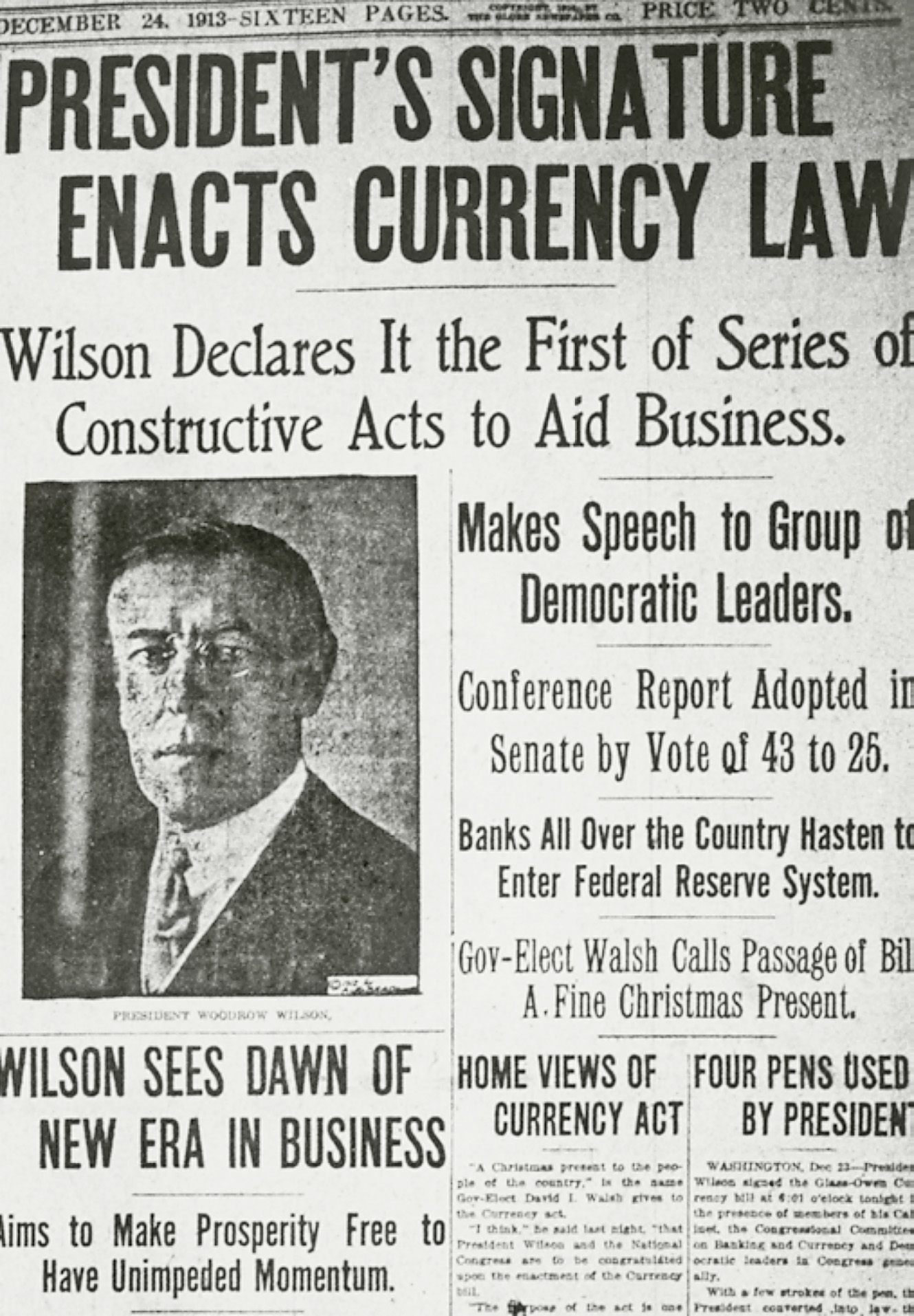

The chief of the bipartisan National Monetary Commission was Nelson Aldrich, a financial expert and Senate Republican leader. Aldrich set up two commissions – one to study the American monetary system in depth and the other, headed by Aldrich, to study and report on the European central-banking systems.

Aldrich went to Europe opposed to centralized banking but, after viewing Germany's banking system, he came away believing that a centralized bank was better than the government-issued bond system that he had previously supported. Centralized banking was met with much opposition from politicians, who were suspicious of a central bank and who charged that Aldrich was biased due to his close ties to wealthy bankers such as J.P. Morgan and his daughter's marriage to John D. Rockefeller Jr.

In 1910, Aldrich and executives representing the banks of J.P. Morgan, Rockefeller, and Kuhn, Loeb & Co., secluded themselves for ten days at Jekyll Island, Georgia. The executives included Frank A. Vanderlip, president of the National City Bank of New York, associated with the Rockefellers; Henry Davison, senior partner of J.P. Morgan Company; Charles D. Norton, president of the First National Bank of New York; and Col. Edward M. House, who would later become President Woodrow Wilson's closest adviser and founder of the Council on Foreign Relations. There, Paul Warburg of Kuhn, Loeb, & Co. directed the proceedings and wrote the primary features of what would be called the Aldrich Plan. Warburg would later write that "The matter of a uniform discount rate (interest rate) was discussed and settled at Jekyll Island." Vanderlip wrote in his 1935 autobiography From Farmboy to Financier:

Despite my views about the value to society of greater publicity for the affairs of corporations, there was an occasion, near the close of 1910, when I was as secretive, indeed, as furtive as any conspirator. None of us who participated felt that we were conspirators; on the contrary we felt we were engaged in a patriotic work. We were trying to plan a mechanism that would correct the weaknesses of our banking system as revealed under the strains and pressures of the panic of 1907. I do not feel it is any exaggeration to speak of our secret expedition to Jekyl Island as the occasion of the actual conception of what eventually became the Federal Reserve System. ... Discovery, we knew, simply must not happen, or else all our time and effort would be wasted. If it were to be exposed publicly that our particular group had gotten together and written a banking bill, that bill would have no chance whatever of passage by Congress. Yet, who was there in Congress who might have drafted a sound piece of legislation dealing with the purely banking problem with which we were concerned?

Despite meeting in secret, from both the public and the government, the importance of the Jekyll Island meeting was revealed three years after the Federal Reserve Act was passed, when journalist Bertie Charles Forbes in 1916 wrote an article about the "hunting trip".

The 1911–12 Republican plan was proposed by Aldrich to solve the banking dilemma, a goal which was supported by the American Bankers' Association. The plan provided for one great central bank, the National Reserve Association, with a capital of at least $100 million and with 15 branches in various sections. The branches were to be controlled by the member banks on a basis of their capitalization. The National Reserve Association would issue currency, based on gold and commercial paper, that would be the liability of the bank and not of the government. The Association would also carry a portion of member banks' reserves, determine discount reserves, buy and sell on the open market, and hold the deposits of the federal government. The branches and businessmen of each of the 15 districts would elect thirty out of the 39 members of the board of directors of the National Reserve Association.

Aldrich fought for a private monopoly with little government influence, but conceded that the government should be represented on the board of directors. Aldrich then presented what was commonly called the "Aldrich Plan" – which called for establishment of a "National Reserve Association" – to the National Monetary Commission. Most Republicans and Wall Street bankers favored the Aldrich Plan, but it lacked enough support in the bipartisan Congress to pass.

Because the bill was introduced by Aldrich, who was considered by southern and western states the epitome of the "Eastern establishment", the bill received little support. It was derided by southerners and westerners who believed that wealthy families and large corporations ran the country and would thus run the proposed National Reserve Association. The National Board of Trade appointed Warburg as head of a committee to persuade Americans to support the plan. The committee set up offices in the then-45 states and distributed printed materials about the proposed central bank. The Nebraskan populist and frequent Democratic presidential candidate William Jennings Bryan said of the plan: "Big financiers are back of the Aldrich currency scheme." He asserted that if it passed, big bankers would "then be in complete control of everything through the control of our national finances."

There was also Republican opposition to the Aldrich Plan. Republican Sen. Robert M. La Follette and Rep. Charles Lindbergh Sr. both spoke out against the favoritism that they contended the bill granted to Wall Street. "The Aldrich Plan is the Wall Street Plan ... I have alleged that there is a 'Money Trust'", said Lindbergh. "The Aldrich plan is a scheme plainly in the interest of the Trust". In response, Rep. Arsène Pujo, a Democrat from Louisiana, obtained congressional authorization to form and chair a subcommittee (the Pujo Committee) within the House Committee Banking Committee, to conduct investigative hearings on the alleged "Money Trust". The hearings continued for a full year and were led by the subcommittee's counsel, Democratic lawyer Samuel Untermyer, who later also assisted in drafting the Federal Reserve Act. The "Pujo hearings" convinced much of the populace that America's money largely rested in the hands of a select few on Wall Street. The Subcommittee issued a report saying:

If by a 'money trust' is meant an established and well-defined identity and community of interest between a few leaders of finance ... which has resulted in a vast and growing concentration of control of money and credit in the hands of a comparatively few men ... the condition thus described exists in this country today ... To us the peril is manifest ... When we find ... the same man a director in a half dozen or more banks and trust companies all located in the same section of the same city, doing the same class of business and with a like set of associates similarly situated all belonging to the same group and representing the same class of interests, all further pretense of competition is useless. ...

Seen as a "Money Trust" plan, the Aldrich Plan was opposed by the Democratic Party as was stated in its 1912 campaign platform, but the platform also supported a revision of banking laws intended to protect the public from financial panics and "the domination of what is known as the "Money Trust." During the 1912 election, the Democratic Party took control of the presidency and both chambers of Congress. The newly elected president, Woodrow Wilson, was committed to banking and currency reform, but it took a great deal of his political influence to get an acceptable plan passed as the Federal Reserve Act in 1913. Wilson thought the Aldrich plan was perhaps "60–70% correct". When Virginia Rep. Carter Glass, chairman of the House Committee on Banking and Currency, presented his bill to President-elect Wilson, Wilson said that the plan must be amended to contain a Federal Reserve Board appointed by the executive branch to maintain control over the bankers.

After Wilson presented the bill to Congress, a group of Democratic congressmen revolted. The group, led by Representative Robert Henry of Texas, demanded that the "Money Trust" be destroyed before it could undertake major currency reforms. The opponents particularly objected to the idea of regional banks having to operate without the implicit government protections that large, so-called money-center banks would enjoy. The group almost succeeded in killing the bill, but were mollified by Wilson's promises to propose antitrust legislation after the bill had passed, and by Bryan's support of the bill.

=== Enactment of the Federal Reserve Act (1913) ===
After months of hearings, amendments, and debates the Federal Reserve Act passed Congress in December, 1913. The bill passed the House by an overwhelming majority of 298 to 60 on December 22, 1913 and passed the Senate the next day by a vote of 43 to 25. An earlier version of the bill had passed the Senate 54 to 34, but almost 30 senators had left for Christmas vacation by the time the final bill came to a vote. Most every Democrat was in support of and most Republicans were against it. As noted in a paper by the American Institute of Economic Research:

In its final form, the Federal Reserve Act represented a compromise among three political groups. Most Republicans (and the Wall Street bankers) favored the Aldrich Plan that came out of Jekyll Island. Progressive Democrats demanded a reserve system and currency supply owned and controlled by the Government in order to counter the "money trust" and destroy the existing concentration of credit resources in Wall Street. Conservative Democrats proposed a decentralized reserve system, owned and controlled privately but free of Wall Street domination. No group got exactly what it wanted. But the Aldrich plan more nearly represented the compromise position between the two Democrat extremes, and it was closest to the final legislation passed.

Frank Vanderlip, one of the Jekyll Island attendees and the president of National City Bank, wrote in his autobiography:

Although the Aldrich Federal Reserve Plan was defeated when it bore the name Aldrich, nevertheless its essential points were all contained in the plan that was finally adopted.

Ironically, in October 1913, two months before the enactment of the Federal Reserve Act, Frank Vanderlip proposed before the Senate Banking Committee his own competing plan to the Federal Reserve System, one with a single central bank controlled by the Federal government, which almost derailed the legislation then being considered and already passed by the U.S. House of Representatives. Even Aldrich stated strong opposition to the currency plan passed by the House.

However, the former point was also made by Republican Representative Charles Lindbergh Sr. of Minnesota, one of the most vocal opponents of the bill, who on the day the House agreed to the Federal Reserve Act told his colleagues:

But the Federal reserve board have no power whatever to regulate the rates of interest that bankers may charge borrowers of money. This is the Aldrich bill in disguise, the difference being that by this bill the Government issues the money, whereas by the Aldrich bill the issue was controlled by the banks ... Wall Street will control the money as easily through this bill as they have heretofore.(Congressional Record, v. 51, page 1447, Dec. 22, 1913)

Republican Congressman Victor Murdock of Kansas, who voted for the bill, told Congress on that same day:

I do not blind myself to the fact that this measure will not be effectual as a remedy for a great national evil – the concentrated control of credit ... The Money Trust has not passed [died] ... You rejected the specific remedies of the Pujo committee, chief among them, the prohibition of interlocking directorates. He [your enemy] will not cease fighting ... at some half-baked enactment ... You struck a weak half-blow, and time will show that you have lost. You could have struck a full blow and you would have won.

In order to get the Federal Reserve Act passed, Wilson needed the support of populist William Jennings Bryan, who was credited with ensuring Wilson's nomination by dramatically throwing his support Wilson's way at the 1912 Democratic convention. Wilson appointed Bryan as his Secretary of State. Bryan served as leader of the agrarian wing of the party and had argued for unlimited coinage of silver in his "Cross of Gold Speech" at the 1896 Democratic convention. Bryan and the agrarians wanted a government-owned central bank which could print paper money whenever Congress wanted, and thought the plan gave bankers too much power to print the government's currency. Wilson sought the advice of prominent lawyer Louis Brandeis to make the plan more amenable to the agrarian wing of the party; Brandeis agreed with Bryan. Wilson convinced them that because Federal Reserve notes were obligations of the government and because the president would appoint the members of the Federal Reserve Board, the plan fit their demands. However, Bryan soon became disillusioned with the system. In the November 1923 issue of "Hearst's Magazine" Bryan wrote that "The Federal Reserve Bank that should have been the farmer's greatest protection has become his greatest foe."

Southerners and westerners learned from Wilson that the system was decentralized into 12 districts and surely would weaken New York and strengthen the hinterlands. Sen. Robert L. Owen of Oklahoma eventually relented to speak in favor of the bill, arguing that the nation's currency was already under too much control by New York elites, who he alleged had singlehandedly conspired to cause the 1907 Panic.

Large bankers thought the legislation gave the government too much control over markets and private business dealings. The New York Times called the Act the "Oklahoma idea, the Nebraska idea" – referring to Owen and Bryan's involvement.

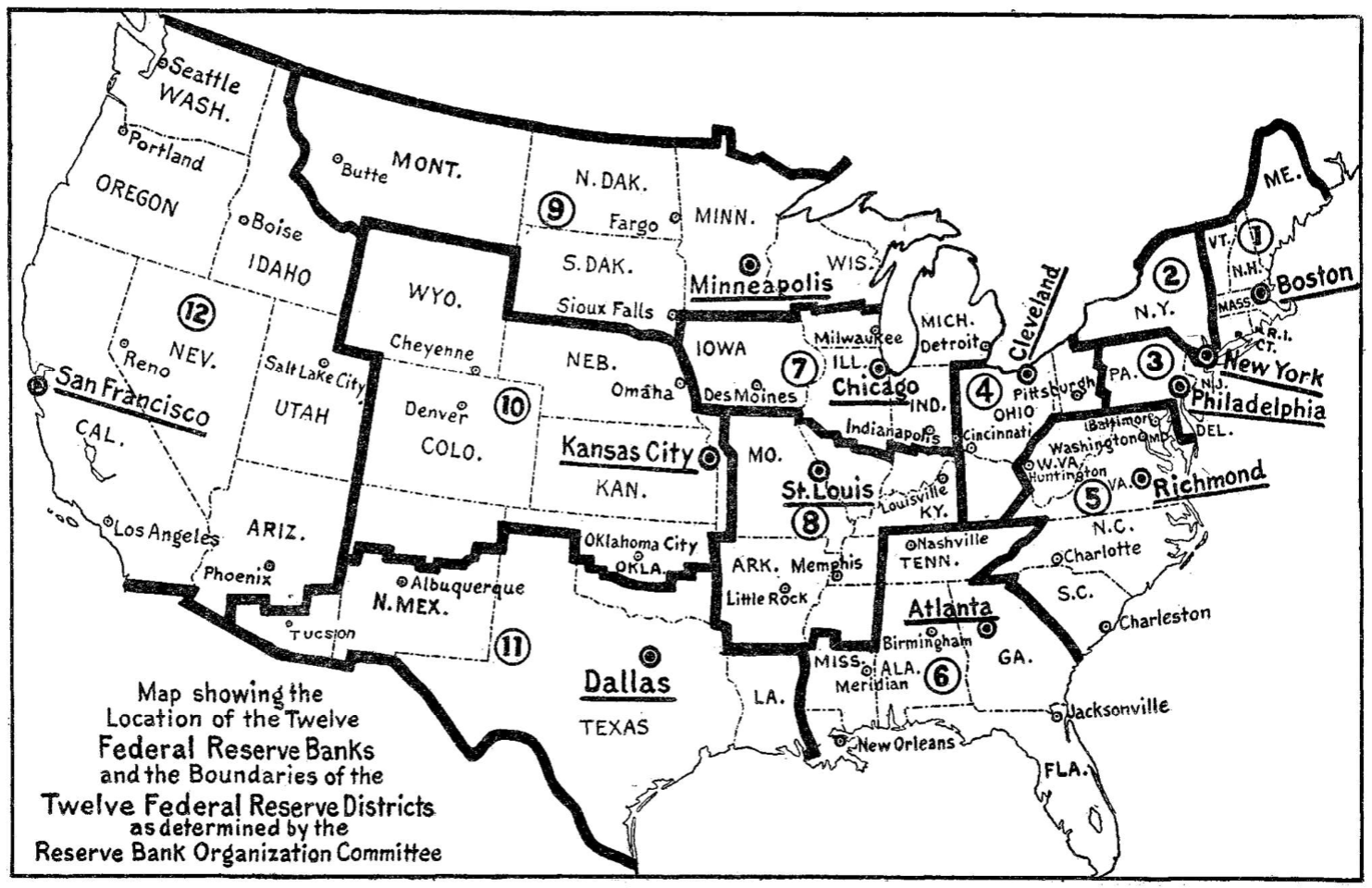
A map published in April 1914 by the United States' Reserve Bank Organization Committee (RBOC) showing the 12 districts created under direction from the Federal Reserve Act of 1913.

However, several Congressmen, including Owen, Lindbergh, La Follette, and Murdock claimed that the New York bankers feigned their disapproval of the bill in hopes of inducing Congress to pass it. The day before the bill was passed, Murdock told Congress:

You allowed the special interests by pretended dissatisfaction with the measure to bring about a sham battle, and the sham battle was for the purpose of diverting you people from the real remedy, and they diverted you. The Wall Street bluff has worked.

When Wilson signed the Federal Reserve Act on December 23, 1913, he said he felt grateful for having had a part "in completing a work ... of lasting benefit for the country," knowing that it took a great deal of compromise and expenditure of his own political capital to get it enacted. This was in keeping with the general plan of action he made in his First Inaugural Address on March 4, 1913, in which he stated:

We shall deal with our economic system as it is and as it may be modified, not as it might be if we had a clean sheet of paper to write upon; and step-by-step we shall make it what it should be, in the spirit of those who question their own wisdom and seek counsel and knowledge, not shallow self-satisfaction or the excitement of excursions we can not tell.

While a system of 12 regional banks was designed so as not to give eastern bankers too much influence over the new bank, in practice, the Federal Reserve Bank of New York became "first among equals". The New York Fed, for example, is solely responsible for conducting open market operations, at the direction of the Federal Open Market Committee. Democratic Congressman Carter Glass sponsored and wrote the eventual legislation, and his home state capital of Richmond, Virginia, was made a district headquarters. Democratic Senator James A. Reed of Missouri obtained two districts for his state. However, the 1914 report of the Reserve Bank Organization Committee (RBOC), which clearly laid out the rationale for their decisions on establishing Reserve Bank districts in 1914, showed that it was based almost entirely upon current correspondent banking relationships. To quell Elihu Root's objections to possible inflation, the passed bill included provisions that the bank must hold at least 40% of its outstanding loans in gold. (In later years, to stimulate short-term economic activity, Congress would amend the act to allow more discretion in the amount of gold that must be redeemed by the Bank.) Critics of the time (later joined by economist Milton Friedman) suggested that Glass's legislation was almost entirely based on the Aldrich Plan that had been derided as giving too much power to elite bankers. Glass denied copying Aldrich's plan. In 1922, he told Congress, "no greater misconception was ever projected in this Senate Chamber."

== Operations, 1915-1951 ==
Wilson named Warburg and other prominent experts to direct the new system, which began operations in 1915 and played a major role in financing the Allied and American war efforts. Warburg at first refused the appointment, citing America's opposition to a "Wall Street man", but when World War I broke out he accepted. He was the only appointee asked to appear before the Senate, whose members questioned him about his interests in the central bank and his ties to Kuhn, Loeb, & Co.'s "money trusts".

WWI broke out just before the Federal Reserve had finished setting up its 12 Reserve Banks, which opened for business in mid November 1914. The markets crashed in a short financial crisis as the war broke out before the Federal Reserve was in a position to do anything about it. $385.6 million in emergency banknotes and $211.8 million clearinghouse loan certificates were issued under the Aldrich-Vreeland Act briefly, allowing banks to continue serving withdrawal requests. All of these funds were eventually rescinded.

US military spending was massive even before the US officially entered World War I in 1917. Federal spending increased fifteen-fold from 1916 to 1918, as the US lent an enormous amount of funds to US allies and as the military mobilized. The Federal Reserve offered below-market-rate interest rates to banks who used the funds to buy government bonds and treasury certificates. This "discount rate" was the primary tool the Fed used during this time. Because of these actions, the money supply increased and consequently prices inflated.

Federal Reserve leaders did not take steps to reduce inflation, however. While the institution was ostensibly created as an independent organization from the government to remove it from political pressures, the political pressure of war nonetheless pressured the Fed to cater to the Treasury's appetite for low-cost war debt financing. At the same time, European gold flowed into the vaults of reserve banks and allowed the dollar to remain backed by gold despite massive monetary expansion, while European countries suspended their gold standards temporarily during the war. The US economy boomed post war as Europe was reliant on US goods their damaged and rebuilding industries couldn't supply for themselves.

In 1923, a recession prompted the head of the New York Fed, Benjamin Strong, to aggressively use open market operations in purchasing government securities to stem the downturn. The Fed made substantial open-market purchases in 1924 and 1927. In 1928, as it became more apparent that a stock market bubble was forming, the Federal Reserve increased discount rates, sold securities, and set guidelines prohibiting banks that made stock market loans from borrowing from the Fed. Sharp disagreements arose within the Federal Reserve System over its levers on the economy and how to use them appropriately. The Great Depression started in 1929, as a result of this contraction; however, the Federal Reserve took basically no action. According to David Wheelock of the St. Louis Federal Reserve, the Fed "more or less let the banking system collapse, allowed the money supply to collapse, and allowed the price level to fall."

In reaction to the Great Depression, Congress passed the Glass-Steagall Act in 1933, established the FDIC, and required bank holding companies to be examined by the Fed. Roosevelt also issued Executive Order 6102 in 1933, which outlawed the holding of more than $100 of gold or gold certificates, among other related decrees.

The Banking Act of 1935 created the Federal Open Market Committee, along with restructuring the Federal Reserve, creating its modern structure. The legislation also placed monetary-policy decisions beyond Presidential control, establishing independence of the Federal Reserve.

After WWII, the Employment Act of 1946 added the goal of maximum employment as a responsibility of the Fed.

== Accord of 1951 between the Federal Reserve and the Treasury Department ==
The 1951 Accord, also known simply as the Accord, was an agreement between the U.S. Department of the Treasury and the Federal Reserve that restored independence to the Fed.

During World War II, the Federal Reserve pledged to keep the interest rate on Treasury bills fixed at 0.375 percent. It continued to support government borrowing after the war ended, despite the fact that the Consumer Price Index rose 14% in 1947 and 8% in 1948, and the economy was in recession. President Harry S. Truman in 1948 replaced the then-Chairman of the Federal Reserve Marriner Eccles with Thomas B. McCabe for opposing this policy, although Eccles's term on the board continued for three more years. The reluctance of the Federal Reserve to continue monetizing the deficit became so great that, in 1951, President Truman invited the entire Federal Open Market Committee to the White House to resolve their differences. Eccles's memoir, Beckoning Frontiers, presents a detailed eyewitness account of this meeting and surrounding events, including verbatim transcripts of pertinent documents. William McChesney Martin, then Assistant Secretary of the Treasury, was the principal mediator. Three weeks later, he was named Chairman of the Federal Reserve, replacing McCabe.

In 1956, the Bank Holding Company Act named the Fed as the regulator of bank holding companies that owned more than one bank.

== Post Bretton-Woods era ==
In 1978, the Humphrey-Hawkins Act required the Fed chairman to report to Congress regularly.

In July 1979, President Jimmy Carter nominated Paul Volcker as Chairman of the Federal Reserve Board amid roaring inflation. Volcker tightened the money supply, and by 1986, inflation had fallen sharply. In October 1979, the Federal Reserve announced a policy of "targeting" money aggregates and bank reserves in its struggle with double-digit inflation.

In January 1987, with retail inflation at only 1%, the Federal Reserve announced it would no longer use money-supply aggregates, such as M2, as guidelines for controlling inflation, even though this method had been in use since 1979, apparently with great success. Before 1980, interest rates were used as guidelines; inflation was severe. The Fed complained that the aggregates were confusing. Volcker was chairman until August 1987, whereupon Alan Greenspan assumed the mantle, seven months after monetary aggregate policy had changed.

== 2001 recession to present ==
From early 2001 to mid-2003, the Federal Reserve lowered its interest rates 13 times, from 6.25% to 1.00%, to fight recession. In November 2002, rates were cut to 1.75%, and many rates went below the inflation rate. On June 25, 2003, the federal funds rate was lowered to 1.00%, its lowest nominal rate since July 1958, when the overnight rate averaged 0.68%. Starting at the end of June 2004, the Federal Reserve System raised the target interest rate, and then continued to do so 17 more times.

In February 2006, President George W. Bush appointed Ben Bernanke as the chairman of the Federal Reserve.

In March 2006, the Federal Reserve ceased to make public M3, because the costs of collecting this data outweighed the benefits. M3 includes all of M2 (which includes M1) plus large-denomination ($100,000 +) time deposits, balances in institutional money funds, repurchase liabilities issued by depository institutions, and Eurodollars held by U.S. residents at foreign branches of U.S. banks, as well as at all banks in the United Kingdom and Canada.

=== 2008 subprime mortgage crisis ===
Due to a credit crunch caused by the subprime mortgage crisis in September 2007, the Federal Reserve used broad-based programs and assisted individual institutions.

The Federal Reserve began cutting the federal funds rate by 0.25% after its December 11, 2007 meeting, disappointing many investors who had expected a bigger cut; the Dow Jones Industrial Average dropped nearly 300 points that day. The Fed slashed the rate by 0.75% in an emergency action on January 22, 2008, to assist in reversing a significant market slide influenced by weakening international markets. The Dow Jones Industrial Average initially fell nearly 4% (465 points) at the start of trading and then rebounded to a 1.06% (128-point) loss. On January 30, 2008, eight days after the 0.75% decrease, the Fed lowered its rate again, this time by 0.50%.

Zero interest-rate policy ran from December 2008 to December 2015. Policies included multiple rounds of quantitative easing, paying interest on excess reserves, and swap lines.

The Federal Reserve increased signalling with forward guidance, press conferences, and economic forecasting.

On August 25, 2009, President Barack Obama announced he would nominate Bernanke to a second term as chairman of the Federal Reserve. In October 2013, he nominated Janet Yellen to succeed Bernanke.

Quantitative tightening ran from 2017 to September 2019.

=== COVID-19 Pandemic ===
The Federal Reserve attempted to counteract COVID's economic effects with a return to zero interest-rate policy and quantitative easing in March 2020, then transitioned to quantitative tightening in June 2022 at the expense of the American economy. Interest rates rose from March 2022 to July 2023 and inflation surged over 22% due to lack of Federal Reserve control over pricing power of U.S. corporations, sparking the Federal Reserve to redefine inflation metrics from a 24-month lookback to only a 12-month lookback to appease Federal Reserve shareholders (including the U.S. bond market).

== Key laws affecting the Federal Reserve ==
Key laws affecting the Federal Reserve have been:

- Banking Act of 1935
- Employment Act of 1946
- Federal Reserve-Treasury Department Accord of 1951
- Bank Holding Company Act of 1956 and the amendments of 1970
- Federal Reserve Reform Act of 1977
- International Banking Act of 1978
- Full Employment and Balanced Growth Act (1978)
- Depository Institutions Deregulation and Monetary Control Act (1980)
- Financial Institutions Reform, Recovery and Enforcement Act of 1989
- Federal Deposit Insurance Corporation Improvement Act of 1991
- Gramm-Leach-Bliley Act (1999)
- Emergency Economic Stabilization Act of 2008
- Dodd–Frank Wall Street Reform and Consumer Protection Act (2010)
- Economic Growth, Regulatory Relief, and Consumer Protection Act (2018)
