= Just cause (employment law) =

Standard in employment law

Just cause is a common standard in employment law, as a form of job security. When a person is terminated for just cause, it means that they have been terminated for misconduct, or another sufficient reason. A person terminated for just cause is generally not entitled to notice severance, nor unemployment benefits depending on local laws.

== Labor union contracts (United States) ==
The standard of just cause provides important protections against arbitrary or unfair termination and other forms of inappropriate workplace discipline. Just cause has become a common standard in labor arbitration, and is included in labor union contracts as a form of job security. Typically, an employer must prove just cause before an arbitrator in order to sustain an employee's termination, suspension, or other discipline. Usually, the employer has the burden of proof in discharge cases or if the employee is in the wrong.

In the workplace, just cause is a standard that an employer has a burden of proving has been met in order to justify discipline or discharge. Just cause usually refers to a violation of a company policy or rule. In some cases, an employee may commit an act that is not specifically addressed within the employers' policies but one of which the employer believes warrants discipline or discharge. In such instances, the employer must be confident that they can defend their decision.

When an arbitrator looks at a discipline dispute, the arbitrator first asks whether the employee's wrongdoing has been proven by the employer, and then asks whether the method of discipline should be upheld or modified. In 1966, an arbitrator, Professor Carroll Daugherty, expanded these principles into seven tests for just cause. The concepts encompassed within his seven tests are still frequently used by arbitrators when deciding discipline cases.

Daugherty's seven tests are as follows:

- Was the employee forewarned of the consequences of his or her actions?
- Are the employer's rules reasonably related to business efficiency and performance the employer might reasonably expect from the employee?
- Was an effort made before discipline or discharge to determine whether the employee was guilty as charged?
- Was the investigation conducted fairly and objectively?
- Did the employer obtain substantial evidence of the employee's guilt?
- Were the rules applied fairly and without discrimination?
- Was the degree of discipline reasonably related to the seriousness of the employee's offense and the employee's past record?

The last test, the degree of discipline, is important because arbitrators want to ensure that the "punishment fits the crime." An employer's use of progressive discipline often gives the employer an advantage in arbitration.

The culture of the community or community standards sometimes play an important role in how just cause is defined, especially if there are issues of immorality. What is accepted in an urban and liberal community may not be accepted in a rural and religiously conservative community. The courts or arbitrator who will rule on a challenge to the discipline may be a product of those communities. Just cause can become controversial in instances when the employer's personnel policies do not address a specific act but the employer believes that just cause exists. For example, if an employee is arrested and charged with a misdemeanor, the employer may deem that sufficient cause for dismissal, even if the employee is not incarcerated or convicted.

== See also ==
- Dismissal (employment)
