= 2021 Major League Baseball season =

2021 MLB season
- League: Major League Baseball
- Sport: Baseball
- Duration: April 1 – November 2, 2021
- Games: 162
- Teams: 30
- TV partner(s): Fox/FS1; TBS; ESPN/ABC; MLB Network; Sportsnet

Draft
- Top draft pick: Henry Davis
- Picked by: Pittsburgh Pirates

Regular season
- Season MVP: AL: Shohei Ohtani (LAA); NL: Bryce Harper (PHI)

Postseason
- AL champions: Houston Astros
- AL runners-up: Boston Red Sox
- NL champions: Atlanta Braves
- NL runners-up: Los Angeles Dodgers

World Series
- Champions: Atlanta Braves
- Runners-up: Houston Astros
- World Series MVP: Jorge Soler (ATL)

MLB seasons
- ← 2020 2022 →

Locations of AL teams for the 2021 MLB season
West Central East
Locations of NL teams for the 2017–present MLB seasons
West Central East

The 2021 Major League Baseball season began on April 1, while the regular season ended on October 3. The postseason began on October 5. The World Series then began on October 26 and ended on November 2 with the Atlanta Braves defeating the Houston Astros in six games to win their second title since moving to Atlanta.

For the second consecutive year, cross-border travel restrictions due to the COVID-19 pandemic forced the Toronto Blue Jays to open their home schedule in the United States, with tenures in Dunedin, Florida, and Buffalo, New York. Later, the Canadian government granted an exemption to allow the Blue Jays to return to Rogers Centre in Toronto, Ontario, beginning July 30.

The 91st All-Star Game held on July 13 was supposed to be held at Truist Park, the home of the Braves, but league officials moved the game to Coors Field, home of the Colorado Rockies, following the passage of the Georgia Senate Bill 202 by the Georgia General Assembly, which MLB considered to be restrictive of voting rights.

This was the final season of the Cleveland Indians competing with that nickname. On December 14, 2020, the team announced that they would unveil their new moniker and associated uniform and stadium changes before the 2022 season to replace the 106-year-old nickname. On July 23, the Indians revealed that their new nickname would be the "Guardians", debuting the following season.

== Schedule ==
Major League Baseball announced the 2021 regular season schedule on July 9, 2020. A full 162-game season was played. As has been the case since 2013, all teams played their four division opponents 19 times each for a total of 76 games. They played six to seven games against each of the other ten same-league opponents for a total of 66 games, and 20 interleague games. For the second season in a row, interleague play will be between corresponding regions (AL East vs. NL East, AL Central vs. NL Central, and AL West vs. NL West) rather than continue the annual rotation. This included the New York Mets and New York Yankees being scheduled to play a series from September 10–12, which featured commemorations of the 20th anniversary of the September 11 attacks in 2001. The 20 interleague games each team played consisted of two three-game series (one home, one away) against its natural rival (total of six games), two two-game series (one home, one away) against each team for two other opponents (total of eight games), and a single three-game series against each team for the last two (one home, one away; total of six games).

The MLB at Field of Dreams game, originally scheduled for 2020 but canceled due to the COVID-19 pandemic, featured a matchup between the New York Yankees and the Chicago White Sox at a purpose-built ballpark in Dyersville, Iowa on August 12. The White Sox won the game 9–8 when Tim Anderson hit a walk-off two-run home run in the bottom of the ninth.

The 2021 MLB Little League Classic featured a matchup between the Los Angeles Angels and the Cleveland Indians at Bowman Field in Williamsport, Pennsylvania, on August 22. The Indians won the game 3–0.

== Rule changes ==
On February 9, Major League Baseball announced the following temporary rule changes for the 2020 season would continue in the 2021 regular season:

- A runner will be placed on second base at the start of every half-inning of any game that goes into extra innings.
- Doubleheaders will be played as two seven-inning games.

Additionally, the broader use of suspended games was carried over from the 2020 season:

- If a game cannot continue because of inclement weather and it is not an official game (trailing team has played less than five innings), the game will be declared a suspended game, continuing from the point of interruption instead of completely restarting.
- If a suspended game resumes with the trailing team having played less than five innings, a normally-scheduled game played after the completion of the suspended game will be seven innings.
  - However, if a game is halted after the fifth inning for a reason that enables it to be a suspended game (like a field issue or equipment failure or if the game was tied when stopped), the game played afterwards retains its nine-inning length.
- In all cases, a suspended game retains the length (seven or nine innings) that it was scheduled for at the time it started.

An increase of the active roster size to 26 players, originally planned for the 2020 season, took effect. Other changes that had also been planned—a limit of 13 pitchers on active rosters and restrictions on position players pitching—were waived for 2021.

COVID-19 protocols from the 2020 season remain in effect, but may be eased by teams once 85% of their tier-one staff (players, manager staff) are fully vaccinated.

=== Foreign substances controversy ===
On June 15, MLB announced that any player found with a foreign substance (used to doctor a baseball or to improve their grip on a baseball) would be immediately ejected from the game, and would receive a 10-game suspension. Heightened enforcement of existing rules that prohibit such substances began after widespread use by pitchers to increase their grip and spin rate.

== Spring training ==
Spring training for the 2021 season began in late February and lasted through March. Teams began workouts and practice for spring training beginning in late February. Pitchers and catchers reported first, followed by position players a few days later.

Prior to the start of the regular season, each team played between 24 and 29 spring training games, beginning on February 28. There were several times during spring training where a team had two different squads playing different teams simultaneously. In addition to spring training games, teams occasionally played exhibition games with non-MLB teams, such as Minor League Baseball teams, independent teams, or college teams. These exhibition games were not counted in spring training standings. Spring training ended on March 30, two days before the Opening Day.

== Standings ==
=== American League ===
AL East
Team	W	L	Pct.	GB	Home	Road
^{(1)} Tampa Bay Rays	100	62	.617	—	52‍–‍29	48‍–‍33
^{(4)} Boston Red Sox	92	70	.568	8	49‍–‍32	43‍–‍38
^{(5)} New York Yankees	92	70	.568	8	46‍–‍35	46‍–‍35
Toronto Blue Jays	91	71	.562	9	47‍–‍33	44‍–‍38
Baltimore Orioles	52	110	.321	48	27‍–‍54	25‍–‍56

AL Central
Team	W	L	Pct.	GB	Home	Road
^{(3)} Chicago White Sox	93	69	.574	—	53‍–‍28	40‍–‍41
Cleveland Indians	80	82	.494	13	40‍–‍41	40‍–‍41
Detroit Tigers	77	85	.475	16	42‍–‍39	35‍–‍46
Kansas City Royals	74	88	.457	19	39‍–‍42	35‍–‍46
Minnesota Twins	73	89	.451	20	38‍–‍43	35‍–‍46

AL West
Team	W	L	Pct.	GB	Home	Road
^{(2)} Houston Astros	95	67	.586	—	51‍–‍30	44‍–‍37
Seattle Mariners	90	72	.556	5	46‍–‍35	44‍–‍37
Oakland Athletics	86	76	.531	9	43‍–‍38	43‍–‍38
Los Angeles Angels	77	85	.475	18	40‍–‍42	37‍–‍43
Texas Rangers	60	102	.370	35	36‍–‍45	24‍–‍57

=== National League ===
NL East
Team	W	L	Pct.	GB	Home	Road
^{(3)} Atlanta Braves	88	73	.547	—	42‍–‍38	46‍–‍35
Philadelphia Phillies	82	80	.506	6½	47‍–‍34	35‍–‍46
New York Mets	77	85	.475	11½	47‍–‍34	30‍–‍51
Miami Marlins	67	95	.414	21½	42‍–‍39	25‍–‍56
Washington Nationals	65	97	.401	23½	35‍–‍46	30‍–‍51

NL Central
Team	W	L	Pct.	GB	Home	Road
^{(2)} Milwaukee Brewers	95	67	.586	—	45‍–‍36	50‍–‍31
^{(5)} St. Louis Cardinals	90	72	.556	5	45‍–‍36	45‍–‍36
Cincinnati Reds	83	79	.512	12	44‍–‍37	39‍–‍42
Chicago Cubs	71	91	.438	24	39‍–‍42	32‍–‍49
Pittsburgh Pirates	61	101	.377	34	37‍–‍44	24‍–‍57

NL West
Team	W	L	Pct.	GB	Home	Road
^{(1)} San Francisco Giants	107	55	.660	—	54‍–‍27	53‍–‍28
^{(4)} Los Angeles Dodgers	106	56	.654	1	58‍–‍23	48‍–‍33
San Diego Padres	79	83	.488	28	45‍–‍36	34‍–‍47
Colorado Rockies	74	87	.460	32½	48‍–‍33	26‍–‍54
Arizona Diamondbacks	52	110	.321	55	32‍–‍49	20‍–‍61

== Postseason ==
=== Bracket ===
Wild Card Games (ALWC, NLWC)
4	Boston	1
5	NY Yankees	0
4	LA Dodgers	1
5	St. Louis	0

Division Series (ALDS, NLDS)
1	Tampa Bay	1
4	Boston	3
American League
2	Houston	3
3	Chicago White Sox	1
1	San Francisco	2
4	LA Dodgers	3
National League
2	Milwaukee	1
3	Atlanta	3

League Championship Series (ALCS, NLCS)
4	Boston	2
2	Houston	4
4	LA Dodgers	2
3	Atlanta	4

World Series
AL2	Houston	2
NL3	Atlanta	4

== Managerial changes ==
=== General managers ===
==== Offseason ====
Team	Former GM	Reason For Leaving	New GM	Notes
Los Angeles Angels	Billy Eppler	Fired	Perry Minasian	On September 27, 2020, the Angels fired Billy Eppler after five seasons as general manager just after the 2020 season, with one year remaining on his contract after they were quietly extended over the summer. Eppler was hired after the 2015 season. Under his tenure, the Angels had five straight losing seasons with no playoffs appearance. On November 12, the Angels hired Perry Minasian as his replacement.
Philadelphia Phillies	Matt Klentak	Resigned	Sam Fuld	On October 3, 2020, Matt Klentak stepped down after a third straight September collapse left the team out of the postseason for the ninth consecutive season. The 40-year-old was reassigned to another position in the organization while Ned Rice served as interim general manager until the Phillies hired Dave Dombrowski as President of baseball operations. On December 22, Fuld was announced as the next GM of the Phillies.
New York Mets	Brodie Van Wagenen	Fired	Jared Porter	On November 6, 2020, the Mets parted ways with Brodie Van Wagenen after two seasons as general manager, hours after Steve Cohen became the new owner of the team. On December 13, the Mets announced Jared Porter as their new general manager.
New York Mets	Jared Porter	Fired	Zack Scott (interim)	On January 18, ESPN revealed that Porter had sent inappropriate images to a female reporter. On January 19, Steve Cohen tweeted that Porter had been fired. On January 27, the Mets named Zack Scott as interim general manager.
Miami Marlins	Michael Hill	Contract Not Renewed	Kim Ng	Michael Hill was not retained by the Marlins after the 2020 season. On November 13, 2020, the Marlins hired Kim Ng as his replacement, making her the first female general manager in league history.
Chicago Cubs	Theo Epstein	Resigned	Jed Hoyer	On November 17, 2020, Theo Epstein announced that he will step down from his role with the Cubs. Jed Hoyer was promoted to take his place.
Texas Rangers	Jon Daniels	Resigned	Chris Young	On December 4, 2020, Jon Daniels, who remains president of baseball operations, announced that he step down from his role as general manager. Chris Young was hired to take his place.

=== Field managers ===
==== Offseason ====
Team	Former Manager	Interim Manager	Reason For Leaving	New Manager	Notes
Detroit Tigers	Ron Gardenhire	Lloyd McClendon	Retired	A. J. Hinch	On September 19, 2020, Gardenhire announced his retirement due to health concerns. Lloyd McClendon was named interim manager for the rest of the season that same day. Gardenhire finished with a 132–241 (.354) record in just under three seasons. The Tigers did not make the playoffs during his tenure. The Tigers hired A.J. Hinch on October 30 as their new manager. In seven seasons, Hinch has accumulated a 570–472 (.547) record while managing the Houston Astros and Arizona Diamondbacks. He led the Astros to two World Series appearances, winning in 2017 against the Los Angeles Dodgers and losing in 2019 to the Washington Nationals, both in seven games.
Boston Red Sox	Ron Roenicke	None	Contract Not Renewed	Alex Cora	On September 27, 2020, the Red Sox announced that Roenicke would not be retained for the 2021 season after only one season following the team and Alex Cora parting ways. Roenicke finished his only season with a 24–36 (.400) record and did not make the postseason. Cora was re-hired on November 6 after serving a one-year suspension imposed by MLB for his role in the Houston Astros sign stealing scandal. Prior to his suspension, Cora was 192–132 (.593) in two seasons with the Red Sox, leading the team to a World Series win in his first season.
Chicago White Sox	Rick Renteria	None	Fired	Tony La Russa	On October 12, 2020, the White Sox announced that Renteria would not return, ending his tenure with the team after four years with one year remaining on his contract. Renteria finished with a record of 236–309 (.433) and one playoff appearance. On October 29, it was announced that Tony La Russa would return to the White Sox as manager. La Russa managed the White Sox during 1979–1986, compiling a 522–510 (.506) record and one playoff appearance. At the age of 76, La Russa became the oldest manager in the majors. He had not managed any team since the St. Louis Cardinals in 2011.

== League leaders ==
=== American League ===
Hitting leaders
Stat	Player	Total
AVG	Yuli Gurriel (HOU)	.319
OPS	Vladimir Guerrero Jr. (TOR)	1.002
HR	Vladimir Guerrero Jr. (TOR); Salvador Perez (KC)	48
RBI	Salvador Perez (KC)	121
R	Vladimir Guerrero Jr. (TOR)	123
H	Bo Bichette (TOR)	191
SB	Whit Merrifield (KC)	40

Pitching leaders
Stat	Player	Total
W	Gerrit Cole (NYY)	16
L	Cole Irvin (OAK)	15
ERA	Robbie Ray (TOR)	2.84
K	Robbie Ray (TOR)	248
IP	Robbie Ray (TOR)	193.1
SV	Liam Hendriks (CWS)	38
WHIP	Robbie Ray (TOR)	1.045

=== National League ===
Hitting leaders
Stat	Player	Total
AVG	Trea Turner (LAD/WSH)	.328
OPS	Bryce Harper (PHI)	1.044
HR	Fernando Tatís Jr. (SD)	42
RBI	Adam Duvall (ATL/MIA)	113
R	Freddie Freeman (ATL)	120
H	Trea Turner (LAD/WSH)	195
SB	Trea Turner (LAD/WSH)	32

Pitching leaders
Stat	Player	Total
W	Julio Urías (LAD)	20
L	Luis Castillo (CIN); Patrick Corbin (WSH)	16
ERA	Corbin Burnes (MIL)	2.43
K	Zack Wheeler (PHI)	247
IP	Zack Wheeler (PHI)	213.1
SV	Mark Melancon (SD)	39
WHIP	Max Scherzer (LAD/WSH)	0.864

== Milestones ==
=== Batters ===
- Yermín Mercedes (CWS):
  - Became the second player in Major League modern history to record five hits in his first career start. Mercedes recorded the five hits on April 2 against the Los Angeles Angels. He joins Cecil Travis who accomplished this feat during the 1933 season.
  - Became the first player in Major League modern history to record eight hits in his first eight at-bats of the season with his first three hits on April 3 against the Angels. His streak ended when he flied out against Tony Watson. Chris Stynes had the longest streak to start a season during the Expansion Era (dating back to 1961) at seven during the 1997 season.
- Akil Baddoo (DET):
  - Became the 31st player in Major League history to hit a home run on the first pitch that they saw. Baddoo accomplished this feat on April 4 against the Cleveland Indians and Aaron Civale. The last person to do this was Willson Contreras on June 19, 2016.
- Tim Locastro (NYY)/(AZ):
  - On April 10 against the Cincinnati Reds, Locastro stole second base in the sixth inning, setting the Major League record for most successful consecutive steals to start a career, with 28, since 1951 (the National League did not track caught steals before 1951). He broke the record that was previously held by Tim Raines.
- Miguel Cabrera (DET):
  - With a single in the fifth-inning against the Kansas City Royals on May 12, Cabrera became the all-time hit leader of Venezuelan-born Major Leaguers by passing Omar Vizquel with his 2,878th hit.
  - With his double in the sixth-inning against the Kansas City Royals on June 15, Cabrera reached 5,000 total bases for his career. He became the 22nd player to reach this mark.
  - Recorded his 500th career home run, against the Toronto Blue Jays in the sixth-inning on August 22. He became the 28th player to reach this mark.
  - Scored his 1,500th career run, against the St. Louis Cardinals in the ninth-inning on August 25. He became the 74th player to reach this mark.
- Kyle Schwarber (BOS)/(WSH):
  - Tied the Major League record of most home runs hit during any two-game span by hitting five against the New York Mets on June 19–20. This was last accomplished by Jose Abreu during the 2020 campaign.
  - With two more home runs on June 24, he became the first player in Major League history to homer 12 times in the leadoff spot across 13 games. Schwarber also became the seventh player in Major League history to hit eight-plus home runs in a five-game span.
  - With his leadoff home run on June 29 against Rich Hill of the Tampa Bay Rays, Schwarber tied the Major League record for most home runs in any ten-game stretch with 12 home runs. He tied the record set by the Indians' Albert Belle in 1995. The home run also tied the Major League record for most home runs in an 18-game stretch with 16. He joins the Giants' Barry Bonds (2001) and Cubs' Sammy Sosa (1998) with this feat.
- Trea Turner (LAD)/(WSH):
  - On June 30 against the Tampa Bay Rays, Turner hit for the cycle for the third time in his career. He became the fifth player in Major League history to hit for three cycles during their career. He holds the Major League record along with John Reilly, Bob Meusel, Babe Herman, Adrián Beltré, and Christian Yelich, who accomplished the feat in 2022.
- Albert Pujols (LAD)/(LAA):
  - With his single in the eighth inning against the Miami Marlins on July 5, Pujols reached 6,000 total bases for his career. He became the fourth player to reach this mark, joining Hank Aaron, Stan Musial and Willie Mays.
- Shohei Ohtani (LAA):
  - With his 32nd home run on July 7 against the Boston Red Sox, Ohtani established a new record for most home runs in a season by a Japanese-born player in the Major Leagues, breaking the record of 31 set by Hideki Matsui in 2004.
  - Ohtani became the first player in Major League history to ever have at least 37 home runs and 15 stolen bases before the end of July.
  - On August 28 against the San Diego Padres, Ohtani becomes the first Japanese-born player to steal 20 bases and hit 40 home runs in a season.
  - On September 25, Ohtani joined Willie Mays as the only players with at least 45 home runs, 20 stolen bases and six triples in a season.
  - From September 22–25, Ohtani drew 13 walks in a four-game span, tying a Major League record set by Babe Ruth in 1930, Bryce Harper in 2016, and Yasmani Grandal in 2021. His 11 walks drawn in the three-game span also tied the Major League record set by Harper in 2016.
  - On October 3 against the Seattle Mariners, Ohtani became the first player in Major League history to have at least 45 homers, 25 stolen bases, 100 RBIs, 100 runs, and eight triples in a season and the second player in AL history to record at least 45 homers and 25 stolen bases in a season, joining Jose Canseco in 1998.
- Rodolfo Castro (PIT):
  - On July 28 against the Milwaukee Brewers, Castro hit two home runs, which were his fourth and fifth Major League hits. All of his hits to that point had been home runs, which was the first time in Modern Era (since 1901) that a player's first five hits were home runs. The streak came to an end on July 30 as he doubled in the first inning against the Philadelphia Phillies.
- Seby Zavala (CWS):
  - On July 31 against the Cleveland Indians, Zavala became the first Major League player to hit his first three career home runs in the same game. Zavala hit his first two off of Triston McKenzie, one of them being a grand slam, and the third was off of Bryan Shaw.
- Jonah Heim (TEX)
  - On August 1 against the Seattle Mariners, Heim became the first rookie in Major League history to hit walk-off home runs in two consecutive games. The first was off Diego Castillo in extra innings and the second was off Erik Swanson.
- Kevin Newman (PIT):
  - Tied the Major League record for most doubles in a game by hitting four against the Milwaukee Brewers in the first game of a doubleheader on August 14. Former Pirates Adam Frazier and Paul Waner also accomplished this feat.
- Joey Votto (CIN):
  - Recorded his 2,000th career hit with a single in the seventh inning against the Chicago Cubs on August 16. He became the 291st player to reach this mark.
- Freddie Freeman / Ozzie Albies / Dansby Swanson / Austin Riley (ATL):
  - With Albies 25th home run on September 4 against the Colorado Rockies, the Braves became the second team in Major League history to have each of their starting infielders hit 25 or more home runs in the same season. They join the 2008 Florida Marlins as the only other quartet of infielders to achieve this feat.
- Vladimir Guerrero Jr. (TOR):
  - Hit his 40th home run on September 6 against the New York Yankees. With this home run, Vladimir Guerrero and Guerrero Jr. became the second father-son duo to have 40-home-run seasons, joining Cecil Fielder and Prince Fielder.
  - Hit his 48th home run of the season on October 3 against the Baltimore Orioles. With this home run, Guerrero Jr. set the Major League record for most home runs in an age-22 season or younger, breaking the record of 47 set in 1953 by 21-year-old Eddie Mathews.
- Wander Franco (TB):
  - By drawing a walk in the seventh inning on September 7 against the Boston Red Sox, Franco set the American League record for the longest on-base streak, at 37 games, for a player 20-years-old or younger. He broke the record of 36 games that was held by Mickey Mantle, who set the record from early September 1951 through early May 1952.
  - With his first-inning double on September 29 against the Houston Astros, Franco extended his streak to 43 consecutive games reaching base. This tied the Major League record for a player 20-years-old or younger with Frank Robinson who set the record during the 1956 campaign. Although he reached on an error in the ninth-inning the very next night, Franco's record-tying consecutive on-base streak came to an end as he went 0-for-4.
- Nelson Cruz (TB)/(MIN):
  - With two home runs on September 7 against the Boston Red Sox, Cruz became the oldest player in Major League history to have a 30-homer season. Cruz, at age 41, bested the record of David Ortiz and Darrell Evans who were 40-years-old when they had their 30-homer seasons.
- Marcus Semien (TOR):
  - Hit his 44th home run for the season on September 29 against the New York Yankees in the first-inning. This set a Major League record for most home runs by a second baseman in Major League history, breaking the record of 43 that was set in 1973 by Davey Johnson.

=== Pitchers ===
==== No-hitters ====
- Joe Musgrove (SD):
  - Musgrove threw his first career no-hitter, and the first no-hitter in the franchise's 53-season history, by defeating the Texas Rangers 3–0 on April 9. He struck out 10 and did not walk a batter, throwing 77 of his 112 pitches as strikes. The only blemish was when Musgrove hit Joey Gallo with a pitch in the fourth inning.
- Carlos Rodón (CWS):
  - Rodón threw his first career no-hitter, and the 20th in franchise history, by defeating the Cleveland Indians 8–0 on April 14. He struck out seven, throwing 75 strikes on 114 pitches. Rodón was perfect through 8 1/3 but lost his bid for a perfect game when he hit Roberto Pérez on his foot.
- John Means (BAL):
  - Means threw his first career no-hitter, and the tenth in franchise history, and the first Orioles' complete game no-hitter in 52 years, by defeating the Seattle Mariners 6–0 on May 5. He struck out 12, throwing 79 strikes on 113 pitches. The only blemish came with one out in the third inning, when Sam Haggerty reached first base on a third strike wild pitch. Means faced the minimum 27 batters, as Haggerty was caught attempting to steal second base. This was the first no-hitter in Major League history in which the only baserunner for the team that was no-hit reached base by an uncaught third strike as well as the first no-hitter in Major League history that was not a perfect game in which the team that was no-hit did not have any batters reach base by a walk, a hit by pitch, or an error.
- Wade Miley (CIN):
  - Miley threw his first career no-hitter, and the 17th in franchise history, by defeating the Cleveland Indians 3–0 on May 7. He struck out eight, throwing 72 strikes on 114 pitches. He was perfect through 6 1/3 before he allowed two baserunners in the seventh inning on a fielding error by Nick Senzel and a walk. Those were his only baserunners allowed.
- Spencer Turnbull (DET):
  - Turnbull threw his first career no-hitter, and the eighth in franchise history, by defeating the Seattle Mariners 5–0 on May 18. He struck out nine, throwing 77 strikes on 117 pitches. He walked two during the outing. Turnbull became the fifth pitcher in Major League history to throw a no-hitter within two seasons of leading the Majors in losses, last accomplished by Scott Erickson with the Twins in 1994.
- Corey Kluber (NYY):
  - Kluber threw his first career no-hitter, and the 12th in franchise history, by defeating the Texas Rangers 2–0 on May 19. He struck out nine, throwing 71 strikes on 101 pitches. His only baserunner was a walk to Charlie Culberson in the third inning. This was the first time since 1969 that no-hitters were thrown on consecutive days.
- Zach Davies / Ryan Tepera / Andrew Chafin / Craig Kimbrel (CHC):
  - Combined to throw the 17th no-hitter in franchise history and the 15th combined no-hitter in Major League history by defeating the Los Angeles Dodgers 4–0 on June 24. Davies struck out four and walked five, throwing 60 of his 94 pitches for strikes. Tepera walked one while throwing 16 pitches, of which nine were strikes. Chafin walked one while throwing 15 pitches, of which 10 were strikes. Kimbrel struck out three and walked one; nine of his fourteen pitches were strikes.
- Tyler Gilbert (AZ):
  - Gilbert threw his first career no-hitter, and the third in franchise history, by defeating the San Diego Padres 7–0 on August 14. In his first career start, Gilbert struck out five, throwing 64 of his 102 pitches for strikes. He issued three walks, all of them to leadoff hitter Tommy Pham. This tied the Major League record for no-hitters in a season, set in 1884. Gilbert also became the fourth pitcher in Major League history to throw a no-hitter in his first career start. The last pitcher to accomplish this feet was Bobo Holloman in 1953. The other two took place in the 1800s.
- Corbin Burnes / Josh Hader (MIL):
  - Threw the second no-hitter in Brewers history, the 16th combined and a record breaking ninth no-hitter in 2021 on September 11 against the Cleveland Indians. In the 3–0 victory, Burnes went eight innings, walked one and struck out 14 in 115 pitches (78 were for strikes). Hader finished out the no-hitter by striking out two hitters in the ninth and throwing nine pitches, seven were strikes. The Indians become the first team in Major League history to be no-hit three times in one season. Zach Plesac was the starting pitcher in all three games that the Indians did not get a hit.

==== Other pitching accomplishments ====
- José Berríos (MIN) / Corbin Burnes (MIL):
  - In their matchup on April 3, they became the first pair of starting pitchers in the modern era (since 1900) that struck out 10 or more batters and gave up one or no hits. Berrios struck out 12 over six innings and did not allow a hit, while Burnes went 6 1/3 and gave up one hit and struck out 11.
- Matt Peacock (AZ):
  - Became the first pitcher since 1945 to make his debut in extra innings and record his first hit and win on April 6 against the Colorado Rockies.
- Craig Kimbrel (CWS)/(CHC):
  - Recorded his 350th career save in closing out a 4–2 win over the Pittsburgh Pirates on April 8. He became the 12th player to reach this mark.
  - Became the fastest pitcher in Major League history to reach 1,000 strikeouts in 613 innings pitched on August 16 against the Oakland Athletics. This record was broken on September 30 by Aroldis Chapman who recorded his 1,000th strikeout in 601 innings.
- Shane Bieber (CLE):
  - Became the first pitcher since 1893 to record 10 strikeouts in each of his first four starts with his 13 strikeout performance against the Cincinnati Reds on April 18.
- Corbin Burnes (MIL):
  - Set the Major League record on April 20 against the San Diego Padres for most strikeouts by a starter to begin a season without issuing a walk. Burnes has struck out 40 batters and broke the record of 35 set by Adam Wainwright in 2013.
  - Set the Major League record for most strikeouts by a pitcher to begin a season without issuing a walk by getting Harrison Bader of the St. Louis Cardinals on May 13. The second-inning strikeout was the 52nd strikeout by Burnes and that broke the record held by Kenley Jansen set in 2017. Burnes streak came to an end later in the game at 58 strikeouts, when he walked Tommy Edman in the fifth inning. This was, at the time, also a Major League record for most strikeouts without a walk.
  - Tied the Major League record for most consecutive strikeouts in a row by striking out ten Pittsburgh Pirates on August 11. Burnes tied the mark set by the Mets' Tom Seaver on April 22, 1970, against the San Diego Padres and equaled in 2021 on June 25 by Aaron Nola against the New York Mets.
- Jacob deGrom (NYM):
  - After his 15-strikeout performance against the Washington Nationals on April 23, deGrom set the Major League record for most strikeouts by a pitcher in their first four starts of a season, with 50. He broke the record of 48 that was set by Nolan Ryan in 1978 and equaled by Shane Bieber earlier this season.
  - deGrom struck out nine against the Boston Red Sox on April 28, which gave him 59 in his first five starts of a season. He tied the record that was set by Nolan Ryan in 1978.
- Madison Bumgarner (AZ):
  - Threw a "complete game no-hitter" in the second game of a seven-inning doubleheader against the Atlanta Braves on April 25. As the game did not go nine innings, it is not counted as a no-hitter by the Elias Sports Bureau, the official statistician of Major League Baseball.
- Gerrit Cole (NYY):
  - With his strikeout of Joey Gallo on May 17 in the first inning, Cole set a Major League record for most strikeouts without a walk at 59, breaking the record set by Corbin Burnes less than a week before. Cole extended his record to 61 before he issued a walk to Gallo in the third inning.
- Zack Greinke (HOU):
  - Became the 135th pitcher in Major League history to amass 3,000 career innings pitched during the game against the Los Angeles Dodgers on May 25.
- David Price (LAD):
  - Recorded his 2,000th career strikeout by getting Curt Casali in the third inning against the San Francisco Giants on May 27. He became the 84th pitcher to reach this mark.
- Yu Darvish (SD):
  - Recorded his 1,500th career strikeout in the sixth inning by getting Steven Souza Jr. of the Los Angeles Dodgers on June 21. Darvish became the fastest pitcher in Major League history to reach that milestone in 197 games. He broke the record of Randy Johnson, who need 206 games.
- Aaron Nola (PHI):
  - Tied the Major League record for most consecutive strikeouts in a row by striking out ten New York Mets on June 25 in the first game of a seven-inning doubleheader. Nola tied the mark that was set by the Mets' Tom Seaver on April 22, 1970, against the San Diego Padres.
- Collin McHugh / Josh Fleming / Diego Castillo / Matt Wisler / Pete Fairbanks (TB):
  - These five pitchers combined to throw a "no-hitter" in the second game of a seven-inning doubleheader against the Cleveland Indians on July 7. As the game did not go nine innings, it is not counted as a no-hitter by the Elias Sports Bureau, the official statistician of Major League Baseball.
- Pablo López (MIA):
  - Set a Major League record for most consecutive strikeouts in the Modern Era (since 1900) to start a game by getting the first nine Atlanta Braves on July 11. The record was eight and was accomplished by Jim Deshaies (1986), Jacob deGrom (2014) and Germán Márquez (2018).
- Alex Reyes (STL):
  - Closing out the Cardinals 2–1 victory against the San Francisco Giants on July 18, Reyes set the Major League record for most consecutive saves to start a career. With his 24th straight save, he broke the record that was held by LaTroy Hawkins. Two days later against the Chicago Cubs, Reyes failed to convert the save, ending his streak at 24 games.
- Aroldis Chapman (NYY):
  - Recorded his 300th career save in closing out a 7–6 win over the Oakland Athletics on August 26. He became the 31st pitcher to reach this mark.
  - Became the fastest pitcher in Major League history to reach 1,000 strikeouts in 601 innings pitched on September 30 against the Toronto Blue Jays. He broke the record that was set by Craig Kimbrel earlier this season.
- Chris Sale (BOS):
  - Recorded his third career immaculate inning on August 26 against the Minnesota Twins, tying the all-time record with Sandy Koufax.
- Ervin Santana (KC):
  - Recorded his 150th career win by getting credited with the win in relief against the Seattle Mariners on August 26. He became the 265th pitcher to reach this mark.
- Max Scherzer (LAD)/(WSH):
  - Recorded his third career immaculate inning on September 12 against the San Diego Padres, tying the all-time record with Sandy Koufax and Chris Sale.
  - Recorded his 3,000th career strikeout by striking out Eric Hosmer of the San Diego Padres on September 12. He became the 19th player to reach this mark.
- Austin Adams (SD):
  - Adams set a new Major League record for the Live Ball Era (since 1920) for most hit-batsmen in one season when he hit St. Louis Cardinals catcher Yadier Molina in the eighth inning on September 17. He broke the record in the Live Ball Era held by Howard Ehmke, who hit 23 batters in 1922 in 279 2/3 innings. Adams set the record in 49 2/3 innings.
- Jon Lester (STL)/(WSH):
  - Recorded his 200th career win on September 20 against the Milwaukee Brewers. He became the 119th player to reach this mark.
- Adam Wainwright (STL):
  - Recorded his 2,000th career strikeout by fanning Luis Urías in the fourth inning against the Milwaukee Brewers on September 23. He became the 85th pitcher to reach this mark.
- Shohei Ohtani (LAA):
  - On September 26 against the Seattle Mariners, Ohtani became the sixth starter in MLB history to make at least 13 home starts without a losing decision and an ERA below 2.00 in a season.
- Kenley Jansen (LAD):
  - Recorded his 350th career save in closing out an 8–6 win over the Milwaukee Brewers on October 1. He became the 13th player to reach this mark.

=== Miscellaneous ===
- Arizona Diamondbacks:
  - Became the first team in Major League Opening Day history to hit four home runs in one inning on April 1 against the San Diego Padres.
  - With their road loss to the San Francisco Giants on June 16, the Diamondbacks tied the Major League record for most consecutive road losses at 22 games. They tied the record that was set by the 1943 Philadelphia Athletics and equaled by the 1963 New York Mets. The Diamondbacks set a new Major League record for road futility the next day against the Giants, as they lost their 23rd straight road game by a score of 10–3. The Diamondbacks would later extend their road losing streak to 24 games when they lost to the San Diego Padres on June 25 before finally ending the streak with a 10–1 win against the Padres the next day.
- Marwin González (BOS):
  - Became the first player in Major League modern history to start at four different positions in the field through his team's first four games of the season. Gonzalez patrolled left field on Opening Day for Boston before manning second base, third base and first base in the ensuing contests, respectively.
- Yadier Molina (STL):
  - Became the sixth catcher in Major League history to catch 2,000 games in his career. He reached this milestone on April 14 against the Washington Nationals. Molina also becomes the first player to do this with a single team.
- Boston Red Sox:
  - In the second game of a doubleheader on April 14 against the Minnesota Twins, the Red Sox became the first team in Major League history to open the season with at least three straight losses and immediately follow that by winning at least nine straight games.
- Oakland Athletics:
  - With their win against the Minnesota Twins on April 21, which was their 11th consecutive win, they became the first team in Major League history to follow an 0–6 start to the season by winning 11 straight games at any point in that same season.
- José Godoy (SEA):
  - Became the 20,000th player to make his Major League debut, on May 21.
- Atlanta Braves:
  - Became the first team in Major League history to hit seven or more home runs and two grand slams in a single game on May 21 against the Pittsburgh Pirates.
- Umpire Joe West:
  - With his umpiring of the Cardinals–White Sox game on May 24, West umpired his 5,375th career Major League regular-season game. This tied him with Hall of Famer Bill Klem, who retired in 1941. West announced he will be retiring at the end of the season. West set a new record the following night, serving as the home-plate umpire.
- Major League Baseball:
  - Josh Donaldson, of the Minnesota Twins, scored Major League Baseball's two millionth run in the sport's history on May 29. Donaldson scored the run in the first-inning on a hit by Nelson Cruz against the Royals' Ervin Santana.
  - On July 19, there were seven separate sets of back-to-back home runs hit that set a Major League record. The players involved in this feat were: Buster Posey and Wilmer Flores (Giants), Max Muncy and Justin Turner (Dodgers), Juan Soto and Josh Bell (Nationals), Pete Alonso and Jeff McNeil (Mets), Kevin Pillar and Michael Conforto (Mets), Pavin Smith and Josh VanMeter (Diamondbacks), Paul Goldschmidt and Dylan Carlson (Cardinals).
  - On August 31, a game between the New York Mets and the Miami Marlins which had been suspended on April 11 was completed. The 142 days between suspension and resumption set a record for the largest gap in Major League history.
- Tony La Russa (CWS):
  - Moved into second place with the most regular-season wins in Major League history with his 2,764th win as the White Sox defeated the Detroit Tigers 3–0 on June 6. La Russa broke a tie that he had with John McGraw. Connie Mack holds the all-time record with 3,731 career wins.
- New York Yankees:
  - Tied the Major League record for most triple plays turned in a season when they turned one on June 20 against the Oakland Athletics. This was their third triple play of the season. The last team to turn three triple plays in a season was the 2016 Chicago White Sox.
- Los Angeles Dodgers:
  - Became the first team in Major League history to have a pair of games with two grand slams in the same season. The Dodgers hit two slams on July 10 against the Arizona Diamondbacks, and on May 2 against the Milwaukee Brewers.
  - Ended the regular season with 106 wins, but finished second in the NL West, a game behind the San Francisco Giants, becoming the team with most wins that failed to finish first in its league or division. The previous record of 104 wins had been set by the 1909 Chicago Cubs and 1942 Brooklyn Dodgers. This also marked the first time in Major League history that two teams in the same division, or even in the same league (American or National), had won 105 or more games in the same season.
- St. Louis Cardinals:
  - The Cardinals became the first team in Major League history to have five Gold Glove winners in one season.

== Awards and honors ==
=== Regular season ===
Baseball Writers' Association of America Awards
BBWAA Award	National League	American League
Most Valuable Player	Bryce Harper (PHI)	Shohei Ohtani (LAA)
Cy Young Award	Corbin Burnes (MIL)	Robbie Ray (TOR)
Rookie of the Year	Jonathan India (CIN)	Randy Arozarena (TB)
Manager of the Year	Gabe Kapler (SF)	Kevin Cash (TB)
Gold Glove Awards
Position	National League	American League
Pitcher	Max Fried (ATL)	Dallas Keuchel (CWS)
Catcher	Jacob Stallings (PIT)	Sean Murphy (OAK)
1st Base	Paul Goldschmidt (STL)	Yuli Gurriel (HOU)
2nd Base	Tommy Edman (STL)	Marcus Semien (TOR)
3rd Base	Nolan Arenado (STL)	Matt Chapman (OAK)
Shortstop	Brandon Crawford (SF)	Carlos Correa (HOU)
Left field	Tyler O'Neill (STL)	Andrew Benintendi (KC)
Center field	Harrison Bader (STL)	Michael A. Taylor (KC)
Right field	Adam Duvall (ATL)/(MIA)	Joey Gallo (NYY)/(TEX)
Silver Slugger Awards
Pitcher/Designated Hitter	Max Fried (ATL)	Shohei Ohtani (LAA)
Catcher	Buster Posey (SF)	Salvador Perez (KC)
1st Base	Freddie Freeman (ATL)	Vladimir Guerrero Jr. (TOR)
2nd Base	Ozzie Albies (ATL)	Marcus Semien (TOR)
3rd Base	Austin Riley (ATL)	Rafael Devers (BOS)
Shortstop	Fernando Tatís Jr. (SD)	Xander Bogaerts (BOS)
Outfield	Nick Castellanos (CIN); Bryce Harper (PHI); Juan Soto (WSH)	Teoscar Hernández (TOR); Aaron Judge (NYY); Cedric Mullins (BAL)

=== All-MLB Team ===
Players were selected through fan votes (50%) and votes from a panel of experts (50%). The winners were selected based on merit, with no set number of nominees per position and no distinction between leagues.

All-MLB Team
Position	First Team	Second Team
Starting pitcher	Walker Buehler (LAD)	Max Fried (ATL)
Starting pitcher	Corbin Burnes (MIL)	Kevin Gausman (SF)
Starting pitcher	Gerrit Cole (NYY)	Shohei Ohtani (LAA)
Starting pitcher	Robbie Ray (TOR)	Julio Urías (LAD)
Starting pitcher	Max Scherzer (LAD)/(WSH)	Zack Wheeler (PHI)
Relief pitcher	Josh Hader (MIL)	Raisel Iglesias (LAA)
Relief pitcher	Liam Hendriks (CWS)	Kenley Jansen (LAD)
Designated hitter	Shohei Ohtani (LAA)	Yordan Alvarez (HOU)
Catcher	Salvador Perez (KC)	Buster Posey (SF)
1st Base	Vladimir Guerrero Jr. (TOR)	Freddie Freeman (ATL)
2nd Base	Marcus Semien (TOR)	Ozzie Albies (ATL)
3rd Base	Austin Riley (ATL)	Rafael Devers (BOS)
Shortstop	Fernando Tatis Jr. (SD)	Trea Turner (LAD)/(WSH)
Outfield	Bryce Harper (PHI)	Nick Castellanos (CIN)
Outfield	Aaron Judge (NYY)	Teoscar Hernández (TOR)
Outfield	Juan Soto (WSH)	Kyle Tucker (HOU)

=== Other awards ===
- The Sporting News Player of the Year Award: Shohei Ohtani (LAA)
- Comeback Players of the Year: Trey Mancini (BAL, American); Buster Posey (SF, National)
- Edgar Martínez Award (Best designated hitter): Shohei Ohtani (LAA)
- Hank Aaron Award: Vladimir Guerrero Jr. (TOR, American); Bryce Harper (PHI, National)
- Roberto Clemente Award (Humanitarian): Nelson Cruz (TB)/(MIN)
- Mariano Rivera AL Reliever of the Year Award (Best AL reliever): Liam Hendriks (CWS)
- Trevor Hoffman NL Reliever of the Year Award (Best NL reliever): Josh Hader (MIL)
- Warren Spahn Award (Best left-handed pitcher): Julio Urías (LAD)

Fielding Bible Awards
Position	Player
Pitcher	Dallas Keuchel (CWS)
Catcher	Jacob Stallings (PIT)
1st Base	Paul Goldschmidt (STL)
2nd Base	Whit Merrifield (KC)
3rd Base	Ke'Bryan Hayes (PIT)
Shortstop	Carlos Correa (HOU)
Left Field	Tyler O'Neill (STL)
Center Field	Michael A. Taylor (KC)
Right Field	Aaron Judge (NYY)
Multi-position	Kiké Hernández (BOS)

=== Monthly awards ===
==== Player of the Month ====
Month	American League	National League
April	Byron Buxton	Ronald Acuña Jr.
May	Marcus Semien	Fernando Tatís Jr.
June	Shohei Ohtani	Kyle Schwarber
July	Shohei Ohtani	Joey Votto
August	José Abreu	C. J. Cron
September	Kyle Tucker	Tyler O'Neill

==== Rookie of the Month ====
Month	American League	National League
April	Yermín Mercedes	Trevor Rogers
May	Adolis García	Trevor Rogers
June	Ryan Mountcastle	Patrick Wisdom
July	Eric Haase	Jonathan India
August	Bobby Dalbec	Frank Schwindel
September	Alek Manoah	Frank Schwindel

==== Pitcher of the Month ====
Month	American League	National League
April	Gerrit Cole	Jacob deGrom
May	Rich Hill	Kevin Gausman
June	Sean Manaea	Jacob deGrom
July	Jameson Taillon	Walker Buehler
August	Robbie Ray	Adam Wainwright
September	Frankie Montas	Max Fried

==== Reliever of the Month ====
Month	American League	National League
April	Matt Barnes	Mark Melancon
May	Liam Hendriks	Ryan Tepera
June	Lou Trivino	Josh Hader
July	Raisel Iglesias	Jake McGee
August	Emmanuel Clase	Devin Williams
September	Liam Hendriks	Camilo Doval

== Home field attendance and payroll ==
Team name	Wins	%±	Home attendance	Per game	Est. payroll	%±
Los Angeles Dodgers	106	146.5%	2,804,693	34,626	$248,108,334	14.6%
Atlanta Braves	88	151.4%	2,299,647	28,746	$127,230,000	−2.7%
San Diego Padres	79	113.5%	2,191,950	27,061	$151,984,286	7.1%
Texas Rangers	60	172.7%	2,110,258	26,053	$67,890,999	−44.5%
St. Louis Cardinals	90	200.0%	2,102,530	25,957	$155,329,667	1.3%
Houston Astros	95	227.6%	2,068,509	25,537	$190,400,000	−12.3%
Chicago Cubs	71	108.8%	1,978,934	24,431	$144,413,500	−20.5%
New York Yankees	92	178.8%	1,959,854	24,196	$209,799,047	−4.0%
Colorado Rockies	74	184.6%	1,938,645	23,934	$92,675,000	−36.0%
Milwaukee Brewers	95	227.6%	1,824,282	22,522	$85,517,626	−17.4%
Boston Red Sox	92	283.3%	1,725,323	21,300	$156,095,000	−9.2%
San Francisco Giants	107	269.0%	1,679,484	20,734	$150,863,778	−1.4%
Chicago White Sox	93	165.7%	1,596,385	19,708	$115,546,333	−3.0%
Philadelphia Phillies	82	192.9%	1,515,890	18,715	$185,286,962	8.9%
Los Angeles Angels	77	196.2%	1,515,689	18,484	$188,408,595	3.9%
New York Mets	77	196.2%	1,511,926	18,666	$184,675,167	13.9%
Cincinnati Reds	83	167.7%	1,505,024	18,581	$116,784,881	−3.3%
Washington Nationals	65	150.0%	1,465,543	18,093	$172,370,147	0.1%
Minnesota Twins	73	102.8%	1,310,199	16,175	$120,158,333	−10.9%
Seattle Mariners	90	233.3%	1,215,985	15,012	$64,605,500	−30.0%
Kansas City Royals	74	184.6%	1,159,613	14,316	$86,820,000	26.6%
Cleveland Indians	80	128.6%	1,114,368	13,758	$50,425,500	−50.6%
Detroit Tigers	77	234.8%	1,102,621	13,613	$78,590,500	−11.1%
Arizona Diamondbacks	52	108.0%	1,043,010	12,877	$77,691,667	−11.9%
Pittsburgh Pirates	61	221.1%	859,498	10,611	$50,255,000	1.3%
Toronto Blue Jays	91	184.4%	805,901	10,074	$121,694,071	60.0%
Baltimore Orioles	52	108.0%	793,229	9,793	$42,075,000	−19.4%
Tampa Bay Rays	100	150.0%	761,072	9,396	$52,937,166	−6.1%
Oakland Athletics	86	138.9%	701,430	8,660	$94,555,834	10.4%
Miami Marlins	67	116.1%	642,617	7,934	$33,150,000	−51.6%

== Uniforms ==
=== Anniversaries and special events ===
- All dates as scheduled and were subject to change.

Team	Special occasion
All teams	#42 patch for Jackie Robinson Day (April 15)
All teams	Pink ribbons for breast cancer awareness (May 9, Mother's Day)
All teams	Patch for Armed Forces Day (May 15)
All teams	Poppy for Memorial Day (May 31)
All teams	"4-ALS" patch for Lou Gehrig Day (June 2) (Cleveland wore them July 28)
All teams	"Play Ball" patch in partnership with USA Baseball and USA Softball (June 5–7)
All teams	Blue ribbons for prostate cancer (June 20, Father's Day)
All teams	Gold ribbons for childhood cancer (September 1)
All teams	#21 patch honoring Roberto Clemente (September 15)
Atlanta Braves	Sesquicentennial Season; In memory of Hank Aaron; In memory of Phil Niekro
Arizona Diamondbacks	20th anniversary of 2001 World Series championship
Baltimore Orioles	55th anniversary of 1966 World Series championship
Boston Red Sox	Patch for Earth Day (April 22)
Chicago White Sox	In memory of Martyl Reinsdorf (from July 9)
Cincinnati Reds	45th anniversary of 1976 World Series championship #8 patch in memory of Joe Morgan
Colorado Rockies	2021 Major League Baseball All-Star Game
Los Angeles Dodgers	40th anniversary of 1981 World Series championship 2020 World Series championship (April 9) #2 patch in memory of Tommy Lasorda #20 patch in memory of Don Sutton
Los Angeles Angels	60th anniversary season
Milwaukee Brewers	#44 patch in memory of Hank Aaron
Minnesota Twins	30th anniversary of 1991 World Series championship In memory of Mike Bell
New York Mets	35th anniversary of 1986 World Series championship #41 patch in memory of Tom Seaver
New York Yankees	25th anniversary of 1996 World Series championship 60th anniversary of 1961 championship 65th anniversary of 1956 championship #16 patch in memory of Whitey Ford; 80th anniversary of 1941 World Series championship
Oakland Athletics	110th anniversary of 1911 World Series championship
Philadelphia Phillies	#15 patch in memory of Dick Allen
Pittsburgh Pirates	50th anniversary of 1971 World Series championship
San Francisco Giants	100th anniversary of 1921 World Series championship First MLB team to wear a Pride Patch
St. Louis Cardinals	15th anniversary of 2006 World Series championship 10th anniversary of 2011 World Series championship #45 patch in memory of Bob Gibson; 90th anniversary of 1931 World Series championship

==== Wholesale changes ====
- The San Francisco Giants added names to their home and alternate uniforms.

==== City Connect uniforms ====
The Nike MLB "City Connect" program aims to create new uniform designs inspired by the teams' home cities. The following teams released alternate uniforms as part of Nike's "City Connect" series:

- The Boston Red Sox City Connect uniforms featured a yellow base with blue letters as homage to the Boston Marathon, which normally takes place on Patriots' Day.
- The San Francisco Giants City Connect uniforms featured an orange and white design, a silhouette of the Golden Gate Bridge and a unique fog gradient across the front, sleeves and numbering of the jerseys.
- The Miami Marlins City Connect uniforms featured a red base, white pinstripes and white letters with light blue trim as a tribute to the Cuban Sugar Kings.
- The Chicago White Sox City Connect uniforms were in a dark grey shade with white pinstripes and features Gothic-styled lettering as homage to the South Side of Chicago.
- The Chicago Cubs City Connect uniforms were dark blue with sky blue accents, with elements inspired by the flag of Chicago. The uniform emblazons "Wrigleyville" in front, in a lettering style similar to the Wrigley Field marquee.
- The Arizona Diamondbacks City Connect uniforms were sand with black letters and red numbers, and features "Serpientes" in front as homage to Arizona's Hispanic community.
- The Los Angeles Dodgers City Connect uniforms featured a blue cap, jersey and pants with "Los Dodgers" written on the cap and jersey.

==== Other uniforms ====
- The Los Angeles Dodgers wore gold-trimmed home jerseys on April 9–11 in celebration of their 2020 World Series championship. They also wore these uniforms on June 15 to commemorate the "reopening" of Dodger Stadium to full capacity.
- The Red Sox wore a "Boston Strong" patch on April 19, Patriots Day.
- Players, managers, and coaches wore No. 42 on April 15 and/or 16 to mark the 74th anniversary of Jackie Robinson's debut in the majors. The Mets and Nationals, who were rained out on April 15, wore them on April 23.
- The Cincinnati Reds wore Spanish language "Los Rojos" uniforms on May 5, Cinco de Mayo.
- MLB introduced a new Lou Gehrig Day commemoration on June 2, which marked the 80-year anniversary of Gehrig's death, and include appeals to ALS-related charities. All players wore a commemorative Lou Gehrig Day patch, and optionally a red wristband reading "4 ALS" in reference to Gehrig's retired No. 4.
- On September 11, the New York Mets wore 2001 era home uniforms with "NEW YORK" on the jersey to mark the 20th anniversary of the September 11 attacks.

==== Throwbacks ====
- The Atlanta Braves wore their 1974 white pullover jerseys from April 9 to 14 in honor of Hank Aaron and Phil Niekro. They broke out the throwbacks again from July 30 to August 1 for Hank Aaron Weekend.
- The Seattle Mariners wore Seattle Steelheads uniforms on June 19.
- The New York Mets wore their 1998–2012 black alternate jerseys and caps for select games.
- The San Francisco Giants wore San Francisco Sea Lions uniforms on June 19.
- The New York Yankees and Chicago White Sox wore 1919 season throwback uniforms on August 12 for the MLB at Field of Dreams game.

== Venues ==
The Milwaukee Brewers' Miller Park was renamed American Family Field after Madison, Wisconsin-based American Family Insurance outbid the Miller Brewing Company for the ballpark's naming rights. Miller's 20-year contract expired at the end of the 2020 season.

On March 31, the Miami Marlins announced that Marlins Park would be renamed to LoanDepot Park, as the naming rights were sold to Lake Forest, California-based LoanDepot.

=== COVID-19 restrictions ===
Unlike 2020, where all games (except the NLCS and World Series) were played behind closed doors, all MLB teams allowed in-person attendance this season; initial capacities were determined by teams and local health officials, and gradually increased to full capacity over the course of the season as active cases declined and more local residents received COVID-19 vaccines. To help promote vaccination, a number of teams announced that they would sponsor walk-in clinics at their home games (with the Seattle Mariners being the first to do so), and offer promotions such as merchandise or game tickets for those who use the clinics (Atlanta, New York Mets and Yankees), or other promotions for vaccinated spectators at games.

On February 18, the Toronto Blue Jays announced that they would open the home portion of their schedule at TD Ballpark in Dunedin, Florida due to travel restrictions enforced by the Canadian federal government. On May 5, it was announced that the Blue Jays would return to Sahlen Field in Buffalo—where the team played the majority of their home games in 2020—on June 1. On July 16, the Blue Jays received a National Interest Exemption from the Canadian government to host games at Rogers Centre beginning July 30.

Capacity and vaccination/testing restrictions as of the 2021 season
Team	Limitations	Source
Arizona	Initial: Capped at 25% capacity. From May 25: Full capacity.	
Atlanta	Initial: Capped at 33% capacity. From April 23: Capped at 50% capacity. From May 7: Full capacity.	
Baltimore	Initial: Capped at 25% capacity. From June 1: Full capacity.	
Boston	Initial: Capped at 12% capacity. From May 10: Capped at 25% capacity. From May 29: Full capacity.	
Chicago Cubs	Initial: Capped at 20% capacity. From June 11: Full capacity.	
Chicago White Sox	Initial: Capped at 20% capacity. From June 11: Full capacity.	
Cincinnati	Initial: Capped at 30% capacity. From April 30: Capped at 40% capacity. From June 2: Full capacity.	
Cleveland	Initial: Capped at 30% capacity. From May 7: Capped at 40% capacity From June 2: Full capacity	
Colorado	Initial: Capped at 42.6% capacity. From June 1: 70% capacity. From June 28: Full capacity.	
Detroit	Initial: Capped at 20% capacity. From June 1: Full capacity.	
Houston	Initial: Capped at 50% capacity. From May 25: Full capacity.	
Kansas City	Initial: Capped at 30% capacity. From May 31: Full capacity.	
Los Angeles Angels	Initial: Capped at 33% capacity. From May 19: Capped at 67% capacity. From June 17: Full capacity.	
Los Angeles Dodgers	Initial: Capped at 33% capacity. From May 5: Capped at 67% capacity. From June 15: Full capacity.	
Miami	Initial: Capped at 25% capacity. From July 5: Full capacity.	
Milwaukee	Initial: Capped at 25% capacity. From June 25: Full capacity.	
Minnesota	Initial: Capped at 25% capacity. From July 5: Full capacity.	
New York Mets	Initial: Capped at 20% capacity with negative COVID-19 PCR test within past 72 hours, negative COVID-19 rapid antigen test within past six hours, or vaccination completed no fewer than 14 days prior to the game. From May 19: Stadium sections that are not reserved to fully-vaccinated spectators are capped at 33% capacity. All other sections have no capacity limit. From June 18: Full capacity	
New York Yankees	Initial: Capped at 20% capacity with negative COVID-19 PCR test within past 72 hours, negative COVID-19 rapid antigen test within past six hours, or vaccination completed no fewer than 14 days prior to the game. From May 19: Stadium sections that are not reserved to fully-vaccinated spectators are capped at 33% capacity. All other sections have no capacity limit. From June 18: Full capacity	
Oakland	Initial: Capped at 33% capacity. Tickets sold to California residents only. From June 9: Capped at 67% capacity. From June 29: Full capacity.	
Philadelphia	Initial: Capped at 20% capacity. From May 21: Capped at 16,000 spectators. From June 12: Full capacity.	
Pittsburgh	Initial: Capped at 20% capacity. From July 1: Full capacity.	
San Diego	Initial: Capped at 20% capacity. From April 7: Capped at 33% capacity. From June 9: Capped at 67% capacity. From June 17: Full capacity.	
San Francisco	Initial: Capped at 33% capacity. From May 5: Capped at 67% capacity. From June 25: Full capacity.	
Seattle	Initial: Capped at 9,000 spectators. From May 13: Capped at 14,000 spectators. From July 2: Full capacity.	
St. Louis	Initial: Capped at 32% capacity. From May 21: Capped at 60% capacity. From June 14: Full capacity.	
Tampa Bay	Initial: Capped at 9,000 spectators. From June 8: Capped at 20,000 spectators. From July 5: Full capacity (25,000. due maximum capacity at Tropicana field due to renovations to the upper decks).	
Toronto	Initial (TD Ballpark): 15% capacity. From June 1 (Sahlen Field): 50% capacity. From June 24 (Sahlen Field): Full capacity. From July 30 (Rogers Centre): Capped at 15,000 spectators (30%); From September 13 (Rogers Centre): Proof of vaccination or negative test required for all attendees 12 and older	
Texas	On March 11, it was announced that the team would not limit attendance for their home opener, but will voluntarily offer designated "distanced seating" sections afterwards. All mandatory capacity restrictions and mask requirements in Texas were lifted on March 10 via executive order, but the team will still mandate masks to be worn by spectators.	
Washington	Initial: Capped at 5,000 spectators. From April 15: Capped at 10,000 spectators. From June 10: Full capacity.	

== Broadcast rights ==
=== Television ===
==== National ====
This was the eighth and final year of the contracts with Fox, ESPN, and TBS before the new seven-year deals begin in 2022. FS1 televised games on Tuesday nights and on Saturday, both during the afternoon and evening. Fox also aired some Saturday night games. ESPN televised games on its flagship Sunday Night Baseball as well as Monday and Wednesday night games and holiday games on Memorial Day and Labor Day. ESPN Sunday Night Baseball telecasts were exclusive.

TBS televised 13 straight weeks of Sunday afternoon games and also televised the National League postseason. The American League postseason was split between ESPN, Fox/FS1, and MLB Network (AL Wild Card on ESPN, the ALDS split between FS1 and MLB Network, and the ALCS on Fox and FS1). For the 22nd straight year, the 2021 World Series aired exclusively on Fox.

A three-game series between the Philadelphia Phillies and the San Francisco Giants, whose regional television rights were both held by the NBC Sports Regional Networks, aired exclusively and nationally on NBC's streaming service Peacock. The first time that NBC Sports produced a nationally televised Major League Baseball game since the year 2000.

ABC televised a Sunday Night Baseball matchup between the Chicago White Sox and the Chicago Cubs on August 8. The broadcast marked ABC's first broadcast of Sunday Night Baseball and the first regular season game it has broadcast since its involvement in The Baseball Network in 1995. Former ABC broadcaster and 2021 Ford C. Frick Award winner Al Michaels appeared as a special guest.

==== Local ====
- On January 4, Marquee Sports Network announced that Jon Sciambi would become the television play-by-play voice for the Chicago Cubs, replacing Len Kasper, who moved to the White Sox radio booth as described below. If Sciambi is unavailable due to his commitments to ESPN, either Pat Hughes, Beth Mowins, or Chris Myers would fill in for him. Mowins will be the first woman to perform play-by-play for the Cubs, and fifth league-wide.
- In January, Victor Rojas resigned as the television play-by-play voice of the Los Angeles Angels to become the president of the Frisco RoughRiders, a double-A affiliate of the Texas Rangers. The Angels announced on March 13 that Matt Vasgersian will serve as its primary play-by-play voice, with Daron Sutton as the substitute during Vasgersian's ESPN and MLB Network assignments (though for part of the 2021 season, Sutton called most of the games as Vasgersian opted to work remotely). Vasgersian and Sutton were also joined by José Mota, who shared color commentary with Mark Gubicza. However, the Angels parted ways with Sutton after only three months, with Rich Waltz taking over as his replacement.
- The Baltimore Orioles and MASN did not renew the contracts of play-by-play voices Gary Thorne and Jim Hunter, analysts Mike Bordick and Rick Dempsey, and studio host Tom Davis, among others. Scott Garceau, who called most Orioles television games last season, took over as the primary play-by-play voice, while Ben McDonald became the backup analyst.
- The Cincinnati Reds hired John Sadak to serve as its television play-by-play announcer. Sadak replaced Thom Brennaman, who was suspended and later fired after he used a homophobic slur in a game on August 19 against the Kansas City Royals.
- New England Sports Network (NESN) announced plans to produce all Boston Red Sox home games in 4K with HDR, making it only the second team (after the Toronto Blue Jays) to produce all regional home games in 4K.
- On March 31, the eve of Opening Day, the Fox Sports Networks were rebranded as Bally Sports as part of an agreement between majority-owner Sinclair Broadcast Group and casino operator Bally's Corporation.
- As part of its co-ownership of YES Network, Amazon Prime Video simulcasted 21 of the Yankees games carried on broadcast TV by WPIX for Amazon Prime subscribers in the New York Yankees' home market.

=== Radio ===
==== National ====
- ESPN Radio aired its 24th season of national coverage, including Sunday Night Baseball, Saturday games, Opening Day, Labor Day games, and the entire Major League Baseball postseason.

==== Local ====
- Nexstar's WGN chose not to continue to originate the Chicago White Sox Radio Network after the current deal's expiration, returning the White Sox back to Good Karma Brands-managed and ESPN Radio-owned WMVP after a fifteen-year interregnum. Len Kasper, formerly the television play-by-play voice for the Chicago Cubs, will move to the South Side to do White Sox radio play-by-play, replacing Andy Masur, who temporarily became the voice of the White Sox for the 2020 season after the death of Ed Farmer.
- In November 2020, the Toronto Blue Jays released their radio play-by-play announcer Mike Wilner. In February 2021, Rogers Sports & Media announced that the Toronto Blue Jays Radio Network will not produce a separate broadcast of games for radio this season, and that all broadcasts will now be a simulcast of the television broadcast on Sportsnet with Buck Martinez and Dan Shulman, augmented with radio-exclusive segments hosted by Rob Wong and Shoaib Ali. The team's remaining radio play-by-play announcer Ben Wagner was reassigned as a field reporter. Rogers' statement that this arrangement was due to COVID-19 protocols and to "minimize travel" has been disputed by media outlets, as radio and television broadcasts of all Blue Jays games had already been called remotely during the 2020 season, with no changes in personnel.
- On February 4, Los Angeles Dodgers Spanish-language broadcaster Jorge Jarrín announced his retirement effective immediately. He initially joined the Dodgers in 2004 as a sales and marketing executive, moving to broadcasting in 2012. He initially called televised games alongside former Dodgers star player Manny Mota before moving to radio in 2015, joining his father Jaime on the Dodgers' Spanish radio team.
- On September 28, Jaime Jarrín announced he planned to retire after the 2022 season, his 64th as a part of the Dodgers' Spanish radio broadcast team. Jarrín, who turns 86 in December 2021, plans to work only Dodgers home games in 2022.

== Retirements ==
The following players retired during the 2021 season and before the start of 2022 campaign:

- Ty Buttrey – April 3
- Devon Travis – April 3
- Héctor Rondón – April 9
- Jay Bruce – April 18
- Neil Walker – April 20
- Jerry Blevins – April 27
- Jordan Zimmermann – May 11
- Tyler Flowers – May 14
- Riley Pint – June 8
- Dylan Cozens – June 22
- Tony Campana – June 26
- Chris Smith – June 28
- Welington Castillo – July 4
- Daisuke Matsuzaka – July 7 – retired at end of NPB season
- Drew Robinson – July 16
- Chris Davis – August 12
- Nate Jones – August 19
- Yadier Molina – August 25 – retired at the end of the 2022 season
- Ryan Braun – September 14
- Alex Avila – September 19 – retired at the end of the season
- Carlos Gómez – September 24
- Brandon Snyder – October 2
- Bubba Starling – October 26
- Buster Posey – November 4
- Brett Cecil – November 8
- Joakim Soria – November 10
- Sean Kazmar Jr. – November 12
- Wade Davis – November 24
- Christian Colón – December 6
- Tim Federowicz – December 7
- Ben Rowen – December 10
- Andrew Romine – December 11
- Kyle Seager – December 29
- Cameron Maybin – January 3, 2022
- Jon Lester – January 12, 2022
- Travis Snider – January 13, 2022
- Melky Cabrera – January 14, 2022
- Francisco Liriano – January 17, 2022
- Wladimir Balentien – January 22, 2022
- Gordon Beckham – January 26, 2022
- Alec Hansen – January 27, 2022
- Montana DuRapau – January 31, 2022
- Nicky Delmonico – February 2, 2022
- Matt Magill – February 3, 2022
- Adrián González – February 5, 2022
- Ryan Zimmerman – February 15, 2022
- Óliver Pérez – February 21, 2022 – retired at the conclusion of the 2022 Mexican League season
- Jake Elmore – February 22, 2022
- Bryan Holaday – March 6, 2022
- Matt Szczur – March 7, 2022
- Adam Conley – March 11, 2022
- Andrew Miller – March 24, 2022
- Albert Pujols – March 28, 2022 – retired at the end of the 2022 season
- Wade LeBlanc – April 2, 2022
- Todd Frazier – April 5, 2022
- Jordy Mercer – April 5, 2022
- Drew Butera – April 5, 2022
- A. J. Ramos – April 6, 2022

== Retired numbers ==
- Ted Simmons had his No. 23 officially retired by the St Louis Cardinals on July 31. This was the thirteenth number retired by the team.
- Roy Halladay had his No. 34 officially retired by the Philadelphia Phillies on August 8. This was the seventh number retired by the team.
- Jerry Koosman had his No. 36 officially retired by the New York Mets on August 28, after the ceremony was delayed a year due to the COVID-19 pandemic. This was the sixth number retired by the team.
- Larry Walker had his No. 33 officially retired by the Colorado Rockies on September 25, after the ceremony was delayed a year due to the COVID-19 pandemic. It was the third number retired by the team.

== See also ==
- 2021 in baseball
- 2021 KBO League season
- 2021 Nippon Professional Baseball season
- 2021 Chinese Professional Baseball League season
- Impact of the COVID-19 pandemic on sports
