= Insured Network Deposit =

Insured Network Deposits
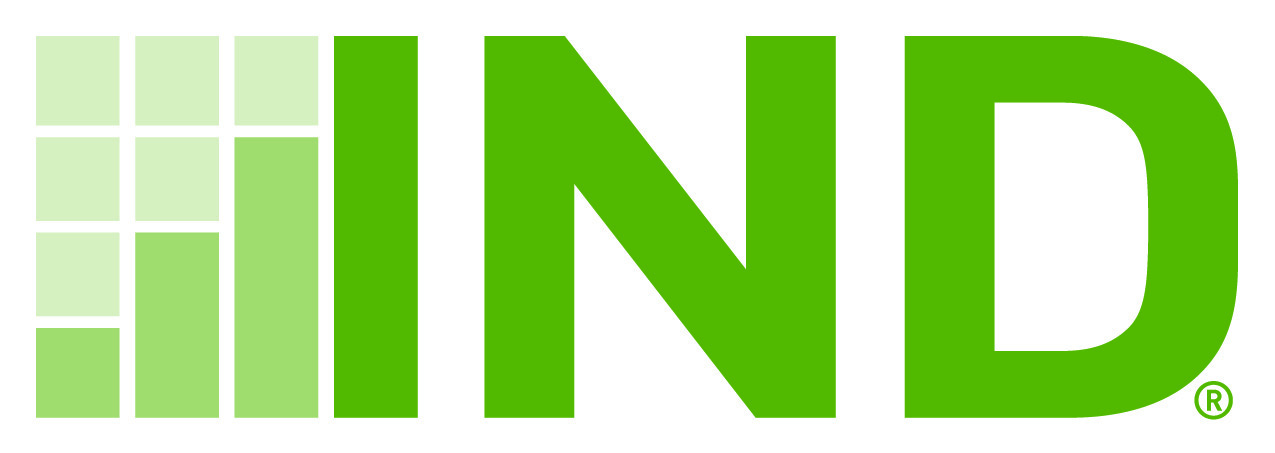
- Industry: financial services
- Founded: 2002
- Headquarters: Arlington, VA, United States
- Services: Certificate of Deposit Account Registry Service; Insured Cash Sweep

The Insured Network Deposits (IND) service was a deposit sweep service for broker-dealers and other custodians of funds. In 2021, the service was reconfigured with several other services offered by IntraFi Network (formerly Promontory Interfinancial Network) into IntraFi Network Deposits, and IntraFi Funding.

Using the service, broker-dealers automatically transfer, or “sweep,” unused cash balances from customer brokerage accounts to interest-bearing deposit accounts at banks insured by the Federal Deposit Insurance Corporation (FDIC) and savings associations. The banks may be affiliated or unaffiliated with the broker-dealer.

By sweeping funds to multiple banks, broker-dealers that use the IND service offer their customers access to FDIC insurance at multiple banks and, therefore, in larger amounts, than the standard FDIC insurance limit for any one bank. Use of a deposit sweep service is an alternative to sweeping funds to money market mutual funds, which are not FDIC insured. This service also provides relatively stable floating-rate funding to banks and savings associations.
