= Insured Cash Sweep =

FDIC service

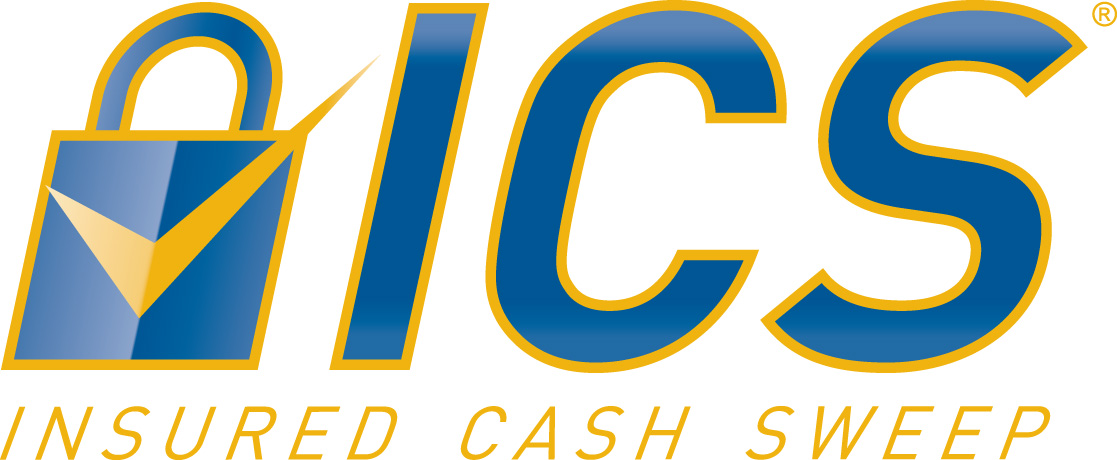
ICS, or the Insured Cash Sweep.

The Insured Cash Sweep (ICS) service is used by banks and savings associations that are insured by the Federal Deposit Insurance Corporation (FDIC). In 2021, the service was reconfigured with several others offered by IntraFi Network into IntraFi Network Deposits and IntraFi Funding.

Financial institutions that offer the service can place the deposits received from their customers into interest-bearing savings accounts at other FDIC-insured banks in the Network.

The provider of the Insured Cash Sweep is IntraFi Network (formerly Promontory Interfinancial Network), which is based in Arlington Virginia. Promontory also offers the Certificate of Deposit Account Registry Service or CDARS service, and the Insured Network Deposit or IND service. The CDARS service allocates deposits in a way that is similar to the ICS service, but allocates the funds to time deposits (certificates of deposit or CDs) at other Network banks, whereas the ICS service allocates the funds to money market deposit accounts.
