= Truth in Savings Act =

Act passed by the U.S. Congress in 1991

- Other short titles: Federal Deposit Insurance Corporation Improvement Act of 1991; Foreign Bank Supervision Enhancement Act of 1991; Qualified Thrift Lender Reform Act of 1991
- Long title: An Act to reform Federal deposit insurance, protect the deposit insurance funds, recapitalize the Bank Insurance Fund, improve supervision and regulation of insured depository institutions, and for other purposes.
- Nicknames: Bank Enterprise Act of 1991
- Enacted by: the 102nd United States Congress
- Effective: December 19, 1991

Citations
- Public law: 102-242
- Statutes at Large: 105 Stat. 2236 aka 105 Stat. 2334

Codification
- Titles amended: 12 U.S.C.: Banks and Banking
- U.S.C. sections created: 12 U.S.C. ch. 44 § 4301

Legislative history
- Introduced in the Senate as S. 543 by Donald W. Riegle, Jr. (D-MI) on March 5, 1991; Committee consideration by Senate Banking, Housing, and Urban Affairs Committee; Passed the Senate on November 21, 1991 (passed voice vote); Passed the House on November 23, 1991 (passed voice vote); Reported by the joint conference committee on November 27, 1991; agreed to by the House on November 27, 1991 (agreed voice vote) and by the Senate on November 27, 1991 (68–15); Signed into law by President George H. W. Bush on December 19, 1991

The Truth in Savings Act (TISA) is a United States federal law that was passed on December 19, 1991. It was part of the larger Federal Deposit Insurance Corporation Improvement Act of 1991 and is implemented by Regulation DD. It established uniformity in the disclosure of terms and conditions regarding interest and fees when giving out information on or opening a new savings account. On passing this law, the US Congress noted that it would help promote economic stability, competition between depository institutions, and allow the consumer to make informed decisions.

The Truth in Savings Act requires the clear and uniform disclosure of rates of interest (annual percentage yield or APY) and the fees that are associated with the account so that the consumer is able to make a meaningful comparison between potential accounts. For example, a customer opening a certificate of deposit account must be provided with information about ladder rates (smaller interest rates with smaller deposits) and penalty fees for early withdrawal of a portion or all of the funds.

The Act is only applicable to deposit accounts that are held by a "natural person" for personal, household, or family use. Accounts owned by businesses or organizations such as churches and neighborhood associations are not subject to these rules.

== See also ==
- Truth in Lending Act
