= Federal Deposit Insurance Corporation Improvement Act of 1991 =

Banking Law in United States

- Other short titles: Foreign Bank Supervision Enhancement Act of 1991; Qualified Thrift Lender Reform Act of 1991; Truth in Savings Act
- Long title: An Act to reform Federal deposit insurance, protect the deposit insurance funds, recapitalize the Bank Insurance Fund, improve supervision and regulation of insured depository institutions, and for other purposes.
- Nicknames: Bank Enterprise Act of 1991
- Enacted by: the 102nd United States Congress
- Effective: December 19, 1991

Citations
- Public law: 102-242
- Statutes at Large: 105 Stat. 2236

Codification
- Titles amended: 12 U.S.C.: Banks and Banking
- U.S.C. sections amended: 12 U.S.C. ch. 16 § 1811

Legislative history
- Introduced in the Senate as S. 543 by Donald W. Riegle Jr. (D-MI) on March 5, 1991; Committee consideration by Senate Banking, Housing, and Urban Affairs; Passed the Senate on November 21, 1991 (passed voice vote); Passed the House on November 23, 1991 (passed voice vote); Reported by the joint conference committee on November 27, 1991; agreed to by the House on November 27, 1991 (agreed voice vote) and by the Senate on November 27, 1991 (68-15); Signed into law by President George H. W. Bush on December 19, 1991

Major amendments
- Dodd–Frank Wall Street Reform and Consumer Protection Act; Economic Growth, Regulatory Relief and Consumer Protection Act

The Federal Deposit Insurance Corporation Improvement Act of 1991 (FDICIA, Pub. L. 102–242), passed during the savings and loan crisis in the United States, strengthened the power of the Federal Deposit Insurance Corporation (FDIC).

It allowed the FDIC to borrow directly from the Treasury and mandated that the FDIC resolve failed banks using the least-cost method available. It also ordered the FDIC to assess insurance premiums according to risk and created new capital requirements.

== Prompt Corrective Action ==
Title I, § 131(a), Prompt Corrective Action, mandates progressive penalties against banks that exhibit progressively deteriorating capital ratios. At the lower extreme, a critically undercapitalized FDIC-regulated institution (i.e., one with a ratio of total capital/assets below 2%) is required to be taken into receivership by the FDIC to minimize long-term losses to the FDIC. The motivation behind the law is to provide incentives for banks to address problems while they are still small enough to be manageable. Spong (2000, pages 90–95) summarizes the details (http://www.kansascityfed.org/publicat/bankingregulation/RegsBook2000.pdf).

In an interview on Bill Moyers Journal broadcast April 3, 2009, former bank regulator William K. Black asserted that federal officials were ignoring the PCA law requiring them to put insolvent banks into receivership. The PCA law applies only to institutions insured by the FDIC and therefore would not affect, for better or worse, companies such as AIG.

== See also ==
- Truth in Savings Act
