= Truth in Lending Act =

1968 US law making credit practices more transparent

- Long title: An Act to safeguard the consumer in connection with the utilization of credit by requiring full disclosure of the terms and conditions of finance charges in credit transactions or in offers to extend credit; by restricting the garnishment of wages; and by creating the National Commission on Consumer Finance to study and make recommendations on the need for further regulation of the consumer finance industry; and for other purposes.
- Acronyms (colloquial): TILA, CCPA
- Nicknames: Consumer Credit Protection Act
- Enacted by: the 90th United States Congress
- Effective: May 29, 1968

Citations
- Public law: 90-321
- Statutes at Large: 82 Stat. 146

Codification
- Titles amended: 15 U.S.C.: Commerce and Trade
- U.S.C. sections created: 15 U.S.C. § 1601

Legislative history
- Introduced in the Senate as S. 5 by William Proxmire (D–WI) on January 11, 1967; Committee consideration by Senate Banking Committee, House Committee on Banking and Currency; Passed the Senate on July 11, 1967 (92–0); Passed the House on February 1, 1968 (383–4, in lieu of H.R. 11601) with amendment; House agreed to House amendment on May 22, 1968 (agreed) with further amendment; Senate agreed to House amendment on May 22, 1968 (agreed); Signed into law by President Lyndon B. Johnson on May 29, 1968

Major amendments
- Credit CARD Act of 2009; Dodd–Frank Wall Street Reform and Consumer Protection Act; Economic Growth, Regulatory Relief and Consumer Protection Act

United States Supreme Court cases
- Mourning v. Family Publications Service, Inc., 411 U.S. 356 (1973); Ford Motor Credit Co. v. Milhollin, 444 U.S. 555 (1980); Ford Motor Credit Co. v. Cenance, 452 U.S. 155 (1981); Anderson Bros. Ford v. Valencia, 452 U.S. 205 (1981); Beach v. Ocwen Fed. Bank, 523 U.S. 410 (1998); Green Tree Financial Corp.-Ala. v. Randolph, 531 U.S. 79 (2000); Household Credit Services, Inc. v. Pfennig, 541 U.S. 232 (2004); Koons Buick Pontiac GMC, Inc. v. Nigh, 543 U.S. 50 (2004); Chase Bank USA, N. A. v. McCoy, 562 U.S. 195 (2011); Jesinoski v. Countrywide Home Loans, Inc., 574 U.S. 259 (2015)

The Truth in Lending Act (TILA) of 1968 is a United States federal law designed to promote the informed use of consumer credit, by requiring disclosures about its terms and cost to standardize the manner in which costs associated with borrowing are calculated and disclosed.

TILA gives consumers the right to cancel certain credit transactions that involve a lien on a consumer's principal dwelling, regulates certain credit card practices, and provides a means for fair and timely resolution of credit billing disputes. With the exception of certain high-cost mortgage loans, TILA does not regulate the charges that may be imposed for consumer credit. Rather, it requires uniform or standardized disclosure of costs and charges so that consumers can shop. It also imposes limitations on home equity plans that are subject to the requirements of 12 CFR 1026.40 and certain "higher-priced" mortgage loans (HPMLs) that are subject to the requirements of 12 CFR 1026.35. The regulation prohibits certain acts or practices in connection with credit secured by a consumer's principal dwelling.

== History ==
The Truth in Lending Act was originally Title I of the Consumer Credit Protection Act, Pub. L. 90–321, 82 Stat. 146, enacted May 29, 1968. The regulations implementing the statute, which are known as "Regulation Z", are codified at 12 CFR 226. Most of the specific requirements imposed by TILA are found in Regulation Z, so a reference to the requirements of TILA usually refers to the requirements contained in Regulation Z, as well as the statute itself.

From TILA's inception, the authority to implement the statute by issuing regulations was given to the Federal Reserve Board (FRB). However, effective July 21, 2011, TILA's general rule making authority was transferred to the Consumer Financial Protection Bureau (CFPB), whose authority was established pursuant to provisions enacted by the passage of the Dodd–Frank Wall Street Reform and Consumer Protection Act in July 2010. Any forthcoming regulations implementing the statute, which are also formally referred to as Regulation Z, will be codified at 12 CFR 1026 and attempt to mirror the FRB's Regulation Z whenever feasible. The Federal Reserve retained some limited rule making authority under TILA for loans made by certain motor vehicle dealers, and for certain other provisions.

The TILA introduced the Annual Percentage Rate (APR) calculation mandated for all consumer lenders. Certain misleading interest rate calculations used previously, mainly on auto loans, were barred. For more than a decade, consumer loans were reported by APR in an economically meaningful way. Then, in the 1980s, the auto manufacturers began to exploit a loophole in TILA and its administration. Neither the Act nor its administrators adequately differentiated between "amount financed" and "finance charges", two terms that appear on the TILA required disclosure statements. By "bundling" the price of the car and its financing charges (which come from the auto maker's captive finance company), auto makers were able to shift money between the two categories, even to eliminating the financing charge entirely. Thus "zero percent APR" financing was born.

Typical offers from auto companies are "Zero Percent APR financing available or $1,000 rebate". The consumer who elects "zero percent" financing gives up a $1,000 rebate (reduction in car price). Effectively, he or she pays $1,000 to get the "interest free" loan. Since only auto makers can do this type of bundling, banks, credit unions and other competitors are left at a disadvantage. They must disclose true APR rates while the auto makers can claim no interest costs. In the process, the typical consumer is left with a complex finance problem. "Zero percent" financing can cost a lot less, or a lot more, than conventional financing with a non-auto maker institution.

== Organization ==
The regulation is divided into subparts.

Subpart B relates to open-end credit lines (revolving credit accounts), which includes credit card accounts and home-equity lines of credit (HELOCs).

Subpart C relates to closed-end credit, such as home-purchase loans and motor vehicle loans with a fixed loan term. It contains rules on disclosures, treatment of credit balances, annual percentage rate calculations, right of rescission, non requirements, and advertising.

Subpart D contains rules on oral disclosures, Spanish language disclosure in Puerto Rico, record retention, effect on state laws, state exemptions (which only apply to states that had Truth in Lending-type laws prior to the Federal Act), and rate limitations.

Subpart E contains special rules for mortgage transactions.

- § 1026.32 frames the requirements for certain closed-end home mortgages.
- § 1026.33 are requirements for reverse mortgage mortgages, including the total annual loan cost rate and transaction disclosures.
- § 1026.34 prohibits acts or practices in connection with "high-cost" mortgages.
- § 1026.35 prohibits acts or practices in connection with "higher-priced" mortgage loans (HPMLs).
- § 1026.36 prohibits acts or practices in connection with credit secured by a dwelling.
- § 1026.39 deals with mortgage transfer disclosure guidelines.
- § 1026.40 sets the requirements for home equity plans.
- § 1026.42 aims to promote valuation independence.

Several appendices contain information such as the procedures for determinations about state laws, state exemptions and issuance of staff interpretations, special rules for certain kinds of credit plans, a list of enforcement agencies, model disclosures that, if used properly, will ensure compliance with the Act, and the rules for computing annual percentage rates in closed-end credit transactions and total annual loan cost rates for reverse mortgage transactions.

== Right of rescission ==
For certain transactions secured by a borrower's principle dwelling, TILA requires that the borrower be granted three business days following loan consummation to rescind the transaction. The right of rescission allows borrowers time to reexamine the credit agreement and cost disclosures, as well as to reconsider whether they want to place their homes at risk by offering it as security for the credit. Each borrower and any person who has a vested interest in the property may exercise the right to rescind until midnight of the third business day following consummation, or delivery of all material disclosures, whichever occurs last. If the required rescission notice or material TILA disclosures are inaccurate or not delivered, the borrowers right to rescind may be extended from three days after consummation to up to three years.

When a borrower rescinds, the security interest becomes void and the borrower is not liable for any amount, including finance charges. The bank must return any money or property given to anyone in connection with the transaction within 20 calendar days and remove any record of security interest that the bank may have taken for the new loan. Until the rescission period has ended, the bank may not 1) disperse funds other than to a valid escrow account, 2) perform any services, or 3) deliver any materials.

The right of rescission does not apply to loans that are obtained for the purpose of purchasing a home, nor does it apply to a refinance or consolidation of a home loan with the same creditor unless the amount refinanced or consolidated exceeds the unpaid balance on the existing debt.

== Exemptions ==
TILA requirements do not apply to the following types of loans or credit:

- Credit extended primarily for business, agricultural or commercial purposes.
- Credit extended to an entity (not a person, with an exception for certain trusts for tax or estate planning), including government agencies or instrumentalities.
- Credit in excess of an annually adjusted threshold, not secured by real estate or personal property, used or expected to be used as a principal dwelling.

== See also ==
- Truth in Savings Act
