= Certificate of deposit =

Document tied to a bank account with a fixed term

A certificate of deposit (CD) is a time deposit sold by banks, thrift institutions, and credit unions in the United States. CDs typically differ from savings accounts because the CD has a specific, fixed term before money can be withdrawn without penalty. CDs also generally have higher interest rates than savings accounts. CDs require a minimum deposit and may offer higher rates for larger deposits. The issuer expects the CDs to be held until maturity, at which time the funds can be withdrawn and interest paid.

In the United States, CDs are insured by the Federal Deposit Insurance Corporation (FDIC) for banks and by the National Credit Union Administration (NCUA) for credit unions. In accordance with the Truth in Savings Act, as implemented by the NCUA, credit unions must refer to these accounts as share certificates, certificate accounts, or certificates.

The consumer who opens a CD may receive a paper certificate, but it is now common for a CD to consist simply of a book entry and an item shown in the consumer's periodic bank statements. Consumers who want a hard copy that verifies their CD purchase may request a paper statement from the bank, or print out their own from the financial institution's online banking service.

== Features ==
Institutions typically offer higher interest rates compared to accounts that allow immediate withdrawals in exchange for the customer depositing the money for an agreed-upon term, although this may vary in situations like an inverted yield curve. Certificates of deposit (CDs) commonly offer fixed rates, but some institutions also provide CDs with variable rates. For instance, many banks and credit unions started offering CDs with a "bump-up" feature around mid-2004 when interest rates were anticipated to increase. These CDs allow for a single adjustment of the interest rate at a time chosen by the consumer during the CD's term. Additionally, financial institutions may introduce CDs linked to the performance of a specific index such as the inflation rate and the bond market index.

Some features of CDs are:

- A larger principal should or may receive a higher interest rate.
- A longer term usually earns a higher interest rate, except in the case of an inverted yield curve (e.g., preceding a recession).
- Smaller institutions tend to offer higher interest rates than larger ones.
- Personal CD accounts generally receive higher interest rates than business CD accounts.
- Banks and credit unions that lack FDIC or NCUA insurance typically provide higher interest rates.

== Closure ==
Withdrawals before maturity are usually subject to a penalty. For a five-year CD, this is often the loss of up to twelve months' interest. These penalties ensure that it is generally not in a holder's best interest to withdraw the money before maturity – unless the holder has another investment with a significantly higher return or has a serious need for the money.

Institutions may mail a notice to the CD holder shortly before the CD matures requesting directions regarding withdrawal. The notice usually offers the choice of withdrawing the principal and accumulated interest or "rolling it over", i.e. depositing it into a new CD. For U.S. bank CDs that renew automatically, a grace period, if offered, permits penalty-free withdrawals after maturity. In the absence of such directions, the institution may roll over the CD automatically, once again tying up the money for a period of time. Additionally, the CD holder may be able to specify at the time the CD is opened for it not to be rolled over.

== Refinancing ==
The Truth in Savings Regulation DD requires that insured CDs state the penalty for early withdrawal at the time of account opening. It is generally accepted that these penalties cannot be revised by the depository prior to maturity. However, there have been cases in which a credit union modified its early withdrawal penalty and made it retroactive on existing accounts. The second occurrence happened when Main Street Bank of Texas closed a group of CDs early without full payment of interest. The bank claimed the disclosures allowed them to do so.

The penalty for early withdrawal deters depositors from taking advantage of subsequent better investment opportunities during the term of the CD. In rising interest rate environments, the penalty may be insufficient to discourage depositors from redeeming their deposit and reinvesting the proceeds after paying the applicable early withdrawal penalty. Added interest from the new higher-yielding CD may more than offset the cost of the early withdrawal penalty.

== Ladders ==
While longer investment terms generally yield higher interest rates, longer-term CDs may result in a loss of opportunity to lock in higher interest rates in a rising-rate economy. One mitigation strategy for this opportunity cost is the "CD ladder" strategy. In CD ladder strategies, the investor distributes the deposits over a period of several years with the goal of having all one's money deposited at the longest term (and therefore the higher rate) but in a way that part of it matures annually. In this way, the depositor claims the longest-term rates while retaining the option to re-invest or withdraw the money in shorter-term intervals.

For example, an investor beginning a three-year ladder strategy starts by depositing equal amounts of money each into a 3-year CD, 2-year CD, and 1-year CD. From that point on, a CD reaches maturity every year, at which time the investor can re-invest in another CD at a 3-year term. After two years of this cycle, the investor has all money deposited at a 3-year rate and has one-third of the deposits mature every year. As each CD matures, the investor can then reinvest the deposits, augment their strategy, or withdraw the funds.

The ladder's responsibility falls on the depositor, not the financial institution. Because the ladder does not depend on the financial institution, depositors can distribute a ladder strategy across multiple banks. This can be advantageous, as smaller banks may not offer the longer-term CDs made by some larger banks. Although laddering is commonly associated with CDs, investors may use this strategy on any time deposit account with similar terms.

== Jumbo CD ==
The best interest rates are generally offered on "Jumbo CDs" with minimum deposits of $100,000. Jumbo CDs are commonly bought by large institutional investors, such as banks and pension funds, who are interested in low-risk and stable investment options. Jumbo CDs are negotiable certificates of deposit and come in bearer form. These work like conventional certificates of deposit that lock in the principal amount for a set timeframe and are payable upon maturity.

== Step-up callable CD ==
Step-up callable CDs are a form of CD where the interest rate increases multiple times prior to maturity of the CD. Typically, the beginning interest rate is higher than what is available on shorter-maturity CDs. These CDs are often issued with maturities up to 15 years, with a step-up in interest happening at year 5 and year 10.

These CDs have a "call" feature which allows the issuer to return the deposit to the investor after a specified period of time, which is usually at least a year. When the CD is called, the investor is given back their deposit and they will no longer receive any future interest payments.

Because of the call feature, interest rate risk is borne by the investor, rather than the issuer. This transfer of risk allows step-up callable CDs to offer a higher interest rate than currently available from non-callable CDs. If prevailing interest rates decline, the issuer will call the CD and re-issue debt at a lower interest rate. If the CD is called before maturity, the investor is faced with reinvestment risk. If prevailing interest rates increase, the issuer will allow the CD to go to maturity.

== Deposit insurance ==
The amount of insurance coverage varies, depending on how accounts for an individual or family are structured at the institution. The level of insurance is governed by FDIC and NCUA rules, available in FDIC and NCUA booklets or online. The standard insurance coverage is currently $250,000 per owner or depositor for single accounts or $250,000 per co-owner for joint accounts.

Some institutions use a private insurance company instead of, or in addition to, the federally backed FDIC or NCUA deposit insurance. Institutions often stop using private supplemental insurance when they find that few customers have a high enough balance level to justify the additional cost. The Certificate of Deposit Account Registry Service program lets investors keep up to $50 million invested in CDs managed through one bank with full FDIC insurance. However, rates on these CDs will likely not be the highest available.

== Terms and conditions ==
There are many variations in the terms and conditions for CDs.

The federally required "Truth in Savings" booklet, or other disclosure document that gives the terms of the CD, must be made available before the purchase. Employees of the institution are generally not familiar with this information, and only the written document carries legal weight. If the original issuing institution has merged with another institution, the CD is closed early by the purchaser, or another issue, the purchaser will need to refer to the terms and conditions document to ensure that the withdrawal is processed following the original terms of the contract.

- The terms and conditions may be changeable, and contain language such as "We can add to, delete or make any other changes ("Changes") we want to these Terms at any time."
- The CD may be callable, and the terms may state that the bank or credit union can close the CD before the term ends.
- Interest may be paid out as it is accrued or it may accumulate in the CD.
- The CD may start earning interest from the date of deposit or from the start of the next month or quarter.
- Institutions generally have the right to delay withdrawals for a specified period to stop a bank run.
- Withdrawal of principal may be permitted at the discretion of the financial institution. Withdrawal of principal below a certain minimum—or any withdrawal of principal at all—may require closure of the entire CD. A US Individual Retirement Account CD may allow withdrawal of IRA Required Minimum Distributions without a withdrawal penalty.
- Withdrawal of interest may be limited to the most recent interest payment or allow for the withdrawal of accumulated total interest since the CD was opened. Interest may be calculated to the date of withdrawal or through the end of the last month or last quarter.
- Penalty for early withdrawal may be measured in months of interest, may be calculated to be equal to the institution's current cost of replacing the money, or may use another formula. Penalties may or may not reduce the principal—for example, if the principal is withdrawn three months after opening a CD with a six-month penalty.
- A fee may be specified for withdrawal or closure or for providing a certified check.
- The institution may or may not commit to sending a notice before automatic rollover at CD maturity. The institution may specify a grace period before automatically rolling over the CD to a new CD at maturity. Some banks have been known to renew at rates lower than that of the original CD.

== Limitations ==
There may be some correlation between CD interest rates and inflation. For example, in one situation interest rates might be 15% and inflation 15%, and in another situation interest rates might be 2% and inflation may be 2%. These factors cancel out, so the real interest rate is zero in both of these examples.

However the real rates of return offered by CDs, as with other fixed interest instruments, can vary significantly. For example, during a credit crunch banks are in dire need of funds, and CD interest rate increases may not track inflation.

The above does not include taxes. When taxes are considered, the higher-rate situation above is worse, with a lower (more negative) real return, although the before-tax real rates of return are identical. The after-inflation, after-tax return is what is important.

Author Ric Edelman writes: "You don't make any money in bank accounts (in real economic terms), simply because you're not supposed to." On the other hand, he says, bank accounts and CDs are fine for holding cash for a short amount of time.

CD rates are correlated with the expected inflation at the time the CD is bought. The actual inflation may be lower or higher. Locking in the interest rate for a long term may be bad (if inflation goes up) or good (if inflation goes down). For example, in the 1970s, inflation increased higher than it had been, and this was not fully reflected in interest rates. This is particularly important, for longer-term notes, where the interest rate is locked in for some time. A little later, the opposite happened, and inflation declined.

In general, and similar to other fixed-interest investments, the economic value of a CD rises when market interest rates fall, and vice versa.

Some banks pay lower than average rates, while others pay higher rates. In the United States, depositors can take advantage of the best FDIC-insured rates without increasing their risk.

As with other types of investment, investors should be suspicious of a CD offering an unusually high rate of return. Conman Allen Stanford used fraudulent CDs with high rates to lure people into his Ponzi scheme.

== See also ==
- Guaranteed investment certificate, a similar investment in Canada
