= LoanDepot =

Nonbank mortgage holding company based in Lake Forest, California

- Type: Public
- Traded as: NYSE: LDI
- Industry: Mortgage lending
- Founded: 2009; 17 years ago
- Founder: Anthony Hsieh
- Headquarters: Irvine, California, U.S.
- Key people: Anthony Hsieh (interim CEO); David Hayes (CFO); Jeff DerGurahian (CIO and head economist); Darren Graeler (CAO)
- Products: consumer mortgages, mello mortgage technology platform
- Revenue: ▲$1.8billion (2022 forecast)
- Number of employees: 4,532 (as of September 1, 2023)
- Website: www.loandepot.com

LoanDepot, sometimes stylized as loanDepot, is an Irvine, California-based nonbank holding company which sells mortgage and non-mortgage lending products.

== History ==
LoanDepot was founded in 2010 by entrepreneur Anthony Hsieh, who had previously founded mortgage companies LoansDirect.com which he sold to E*Trade in 2001, and HomeLoanCenter.com, which he sold to LendingTree in 2004. The company's products at the time included fixed rate, jumbo, FHA and home equity loans, in addition to more controversial adjustable-rate mortgages (ARM) and negative amortization products.

In November 2015, LoanDepot claimed to be the second largest non-bank provider of direct-to-consumer loans in the United States and postponed a planned IPO, citing poor market conditions. In March 2017, the company introduced technology to automate the loan process, allowing customers to apply for a mortgage without talking to a loan officer. In January 2018, the company announced two products as part of its technology platform, a home improvement unit to allow contractors to offer financing to customers, and Mello Home, a platform to connect pre-approved buyers to realtors. In September 2019, the company partnered with Century 21 Redwood Realty to form a new mortgage platform for the mid-Atlantic area, Day 1 Mortgage.

In 2020, LoanDepot made $100 billion of mortgage originations for the first time, with just under 300,000 loans originated, which was twice the amount of loans originated the previous year, according to industry data tracker iEmergent, which also found LoanDepot to be the fourth-largest mortgage provider based on the dollar amount of the loans. In 2020, Hsieh was paid "a special one-time discretionary bonus" of $42.5 million, and other executives received smaller bonuses, between $9 million and about $12 million.

LoanDepot went public on the New York Stock Exchange on February 11, 2021, under the ticker symbol LDI. Shares were sold at $14 and by September 2021 had lost about half of their value, with the company valued at $2.2 billion.

In March 2021, the company acquired the naming rights to Marlins Park, the home ballpark of the Miami Marlins of Major League Baseball. The baseball park was subsequently renamed LoanDepot park.

In April 2022, Hsieh stepped down from his role as chairman and CEO to become the executive chairman of the company. He was succeeded by Frank Martell. Martell subsequently left the CEO position in 2025, and Hsieh returned as CEO and president.

In July 2022, LoanDepot filed a statement with the Securities and Exchange Commission announcing it would reduce its workforce from 11,300 to 6,500, and that it currently had 8,500 employees. On July 12, the LoanDepot stock price was about $1.50 per share.

== Controversies and litgation ==
=== Tammy Richards lawsuit ===
In September 2021, LoanDepot was sued by Tammy Richards, a former chief operations officer (COO) for the company. She alleged that LoanDepot engaged in improper mortgage origination practices and that she was subjected to gender discrimination and other employment-related violations.

Before a trial was held, several of Richards' claims were dismissed. In February 2025, a jury ruled in favor of the company on the remaining allegations. Although Richards filed an appeal that April, the court awarded LoanDepot approximately $750,000 in attorney fees and other costs against Richards and her legal counsel the following March.

=== Securities litigation ===
Beginning in September 2021, two securities class actions were filed in the United States District Court for the Central District of California regarding statements made in connection with LoanDepot's 2021 IPO and subsequent disclosures. The cases were consolidated, and an amended complaint was filed in June 2022. By May 2024, the case was approved for settlement for $3.5 million, but was dismissed. The case was subsequently appealed by a class member to the United States Court of Appeals for the Ninth Circuit. In August 2025, the Ninth Circuit approved of the settlement.

=== Cybersecurity incident and data-breach litigation ===
In January 2024, LoanDepot announced that an unauthorized third party had accessed certain company systems between January 3 and January 5, 2024. The company stated that personally identifiable information associated with approximately 16.9 million individuals may have been affected.

The announcement resulted in 23 putative class action lawsuits alleging harm from the cybersecurity incident. The cases were consolidated in the United States District Court for the Central District of California as In re LoanDepot Data Breach Litigation, No. 8:24-cv-00136-DOC-JDE.

The following January, the court granted preliminary approval to a proposed settlement for a $25 million non-reversionary fund and provided for cash payments, reimbursement of certain documented out-of-pocket expenses, two years of financial monitoring and identity-theft insurance, and additional security measures by LoanDepot.

The court granted final approval of the settlement in August of that year. As a result, approximately 16.9 million people were covered by the settlement. The settlement also included security improvements in addition to the $25 million settlement fund.

The company also reported that it received inquiries and requests for information from various states and regulators regarding the cybersecurity incident. LoanDepot stated that it was cooperating with those inquiries.

=== Telephone Consumer Protection Act litigation ===
LoanDepot was named a defendant in multiple putative class actions alleging violations of the Telephone Consumer Protection Act concerning marketing and customer communications. The company's 2025 annual report stated that Jeffrey Kearns v. LoanDepot.com, LLC, filed in June 2022 in the Central District of California, had been certified as a class action and remained pending as of the filing of the report. Other TCPA cases had not been certified as class actions.

=== Loan-origination compensation litigation ===
In July 2025, five mortgage borrowers filed a putative class action against LoanDepot in the United States District Court for the District of Maryland. The filings alleged violations of the Truth in Lending Act related to loan-officer compensation practices.

The plaintiffs alleged that LoanDepot guided borrowers toward mortgages with higher interest rates or fees by tying loan-officer compensation to loan profitability or terms. LoanDepot subsequently denied liability.

In August 2026, the court denied a motion to dismiss filed by LoanDepot. The ruling did not result in a determination of whether the company was liable for the allegations.

=== Website privacy litigation ===
In December 2025, a class action lawsuit was filed against LoanDepot in the California Superior Court in Alameda County, California. The suit alleged that cookies and other tracking technologies collected website activity even when visitors had declined consent through the company's cookie-preference tool. The complaint alleged violations of the California Invasion of Privacy Act, a breach of contract and the California Unfair Competition Law. It sought damages, equitable relief, credit monitoring and attorneys' fees and costs.

LoanDepot stated that it would defend its actions.
