= Profitable Sunrise =

Ponzi scheme that operated between 2012 and 2013

Profitable Sunrise was a Ponzi scheme that operated between 2012 and 2013, accepting deposits from members and promising returns on investment of 1.5% to 2.8% per business day, thousands of percent annualized. It solicited members around the world, particularly among Christian communities in the United States of America and in Canada. Profitable Sunrise took in as much as $100 million, an unusually high amount for a high yield investment program, before collapsing.

== Operations ==
The program was run by Inter Reef Ltd. by persons using the false names of Roman and Radoslav Novak. Inter Reef had its headquarters address in Birmingham, its web site hosted in Los Angeles, and its banking operations in the Czech Republic.

Profitable Sunrise allegedly told investors that it lent money to borrowers at 3% interest per day. The company offered investors programs with returns on investment such as 2% per business day, with funds available for withdrawal 170 business days after investment. The Minnesota Department of Commerce said that a $1,000 investment yielding 2% per business day would be worth $37,198 after 170 business days. The company also offered commissions to investors for referring additional investors. Regulators were unable to verify the existence of any of the estimated $400 million in loans that Profitable Sunrise claimed to have.

== Legal actions ==
Profitable Sunrise used Christian imagery, promising both large returns and charitable donations, and appealed to ministries to find new members. Mike DeWine, then Attorney General of Ohio, in 2013 announced a lawsuit and temporary restraining order against Nancy Jo Frazer, David Frazer, Albert Rosebrock, and their charity, Defining Vision Ministries, formerly known as Focus Up Ministries, Inc. Ms. Frazer claimed that neither she, her husband, nor Mr. Rosebrock knew about the fraudulent nature of Profitable Sunrise. The state claimed that all three persons solicited investments in the scheme. As part of a settlement in January 2015 with the state of Ohio, the three defendants agreed to dissolve their organization, not to hold another position at an Ohio nonprofit, and not to sell securities in the state.

The company attracted considerable legal action because it was not registered to sell securities in the U.S. or Canada. At least 31 states filed cease and desist orders against Profitable Sunrise or its promoters, including Colorado, Delaware, Georgia, Indiana, Kansas, Minnesota, and Ohio. The Canadian provinces of Alberta, British Columbia, New Brunswick, Ontario, and Québec warned residents about Profitable Sunrise's activity, with the British Columbia Securities Commission noting that the company was not registered to sell securities and had no prospectus for investors.

== Downfall ==
In early April 2013, Roman Novak said that he was moving Profitable Sunrise's servers to Hong Kong to protect the business. On April 4, 2013, the U.S. Securities and Exchange Commission filed an enforcement action against Inter Reef and the Czech-based companies Melland Co., Color Shock, Solutions Co. and Fortuna-K. Assets associated with these companies were frozen. On May 25, 2016, the United States Attorney's Office for the Northern District of Ohio forfeited approximately €8.8 million ($10.8 million) related to Profitable Sunrise that was being held at a bank in Hungary. These proceeds were distributed to eligible victims.
