= Jesinoski v. Countrywide Home Loans, Inc. =

- Supreme Court of the United States

Argued November 4, 2014 Decided January 13, 2015
- Full case name: Jesinoski et ux. v. Countrywide Home Loans, Inc., et al.
- Docket no.: 13–684
- Citations: 574 U.S. 259 (more) 135 S. Ct. 790; 190 L. Ed. 2d 650
- Argument: Oral argument
- Opinion announcement: Opinion announcement

Case history
- Prior: 729 F.3d 1092 (8th Cir. 2013)

Holding
- The Truth in Lending Act does not require borrowers to file a lawsuit to effectuate rescission.

Court membership
- Chief Justice John Roberts Associate Justices Antonin Scalia · Anthony Kennedy; Clarence Thomas · Ruth Bader Ginsburg; Stephen Breyer · Samuel Alito; Sonia Sotomayor · Elena Kagan

Case opinion
- Majority: Scalia, joined by unanimous

Laws applied
- Truth in Lending Act

Jesinoski v. Countrywide Home Loans, Inc., 574 U.S. 259 (2015), was a United States Supreme Court case in which the Court held that the Truth in Lending Act does not require borrowers to file a lawsuit to rescind loans and that sending written notice is sufficient to effectuate rescission. Some commentators described Justice Antonin Scalia's unanimous majority opinion as "terse" and the "shortest opinion of the year". Other analysts have described Jesinoski as a "landmark case" in Truth in Lending Act jurisprudence.

== Background ==
=== Truth in Lending Act rescission requirements ===
In 1968, Congress passed the Truth in Lending Act to help consumers "avoid the uninformed use of credit, and to protect the consumer against inaccurate and unfair credit billing." The Act gives borrowers the unconditional right to rescind loans within three days of consummation of the loan, after which they may rescind only if the lender failed to satisfy the Act’s disclosure requirements. However, even if lenders never provide the required disclosures, borrowers only retain the right to rescind loans up to three years after the loan's consummation.

=== Initial lawsuit ===
On February 23, 2010, exactly three years after borrowing $611,000 from Countrywide Home Loans, Inc. (Note: Countrywide was acquired by Bank of America in August 2007 and later changed its name to Bank of America Home Loans) to refinance the mortgage on their home, Larry and Cheryle Jesinoski mailed a letter to Countrywide to rescind the loan agreement. On March 12, 2010, Bank of America Home Loans sent a reply letter in which they refused to acknowledge the validity of the rescission. The Jesinoskis filed suit in federal district court on February 24, 2011 seeking a declaration of rescission and damages. The district court ruled in favor of Bank of America and concluded that the Truth in Lending Act requires borrowers seeking rescission of a loan to file a lawsuit within three years of consummating the loan. Because the Jesinoskis filed their lawsuit four years after the loan's consummation, they were not entitled to rescission of the loan. The United States Court of Appeals for the Eighth Circuit upheld the decision of the district court. The Jesinoskis appealed again, and the Supreme Court granted certiorari on April 28, 2014.

== Opinion of the Court ==
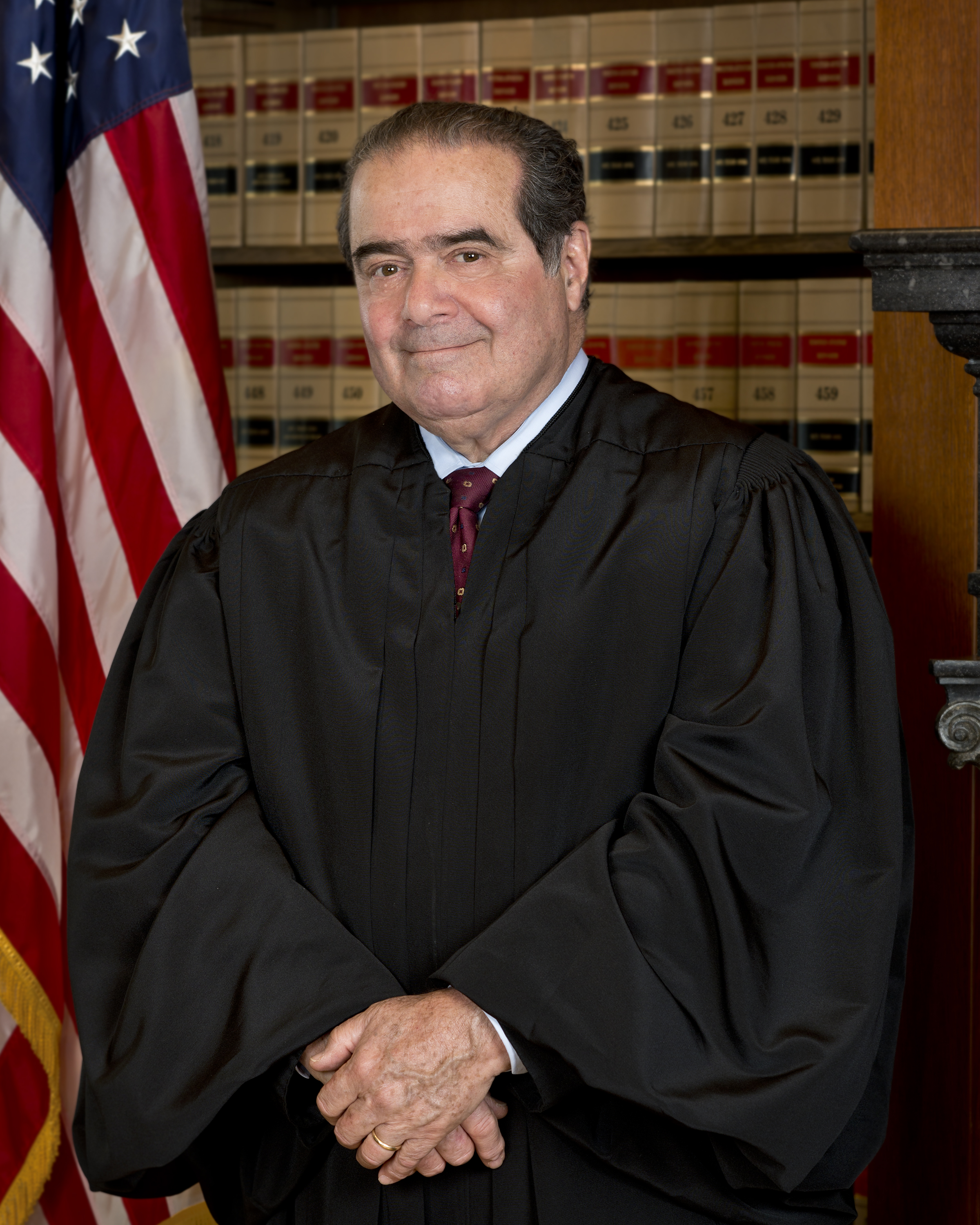
Commentators described Justice Antonin Scalia's unanimous opinion as the "shortest opinion of the year."

Writing for a unanimous court, Justice Antonin Scalia ruled that the Truth in Lending Act does not require borrowers to file a lawsuit to effectuate rescission. Justice Scalia stated that the plain language of the act "leaves no doubt that rescission is effected when the borrower notifies the creditor of his intention to rescind," but the act "says nothing about how that right is exercised." Although common law rules for rescission traditionally required "either that the rescinding party return what he received" or a court's "decree [of] rescission," Justice Scalia concluded that the Act did not adopt these common law requirements. Instead, he argued that "[n]othing in our jurisprudence, and no tool of statutory interpretation, requires that a congressional Act must be construed as implementing its closest common-law analogue." Consequently, the statute has effectively altered common law practice, and borrowers "need only provide written notice to a lender in order to exercise his right to rescind."

== Commentary and analysis ==
After the Supreme Court issued its opinion, analysts described Jesinoski as a "landmark case" in Truth in Lending Act jurisprudence. Other commentators praised the court for "correctly read[ing]" the Truth in Lending Act "to mean what it says." Some analysts also described Justice Scalia's opinion as "terse" and the "shortest opinion of the year" with "only six paragraphs of analysis." Others predicted Justice Scalia's textualist approach in Jesinoski would foreshadow a similar analytic approach for the Court's decision in King v. Burwell.
