= Zack Scott =

American sports executive (born 1977)

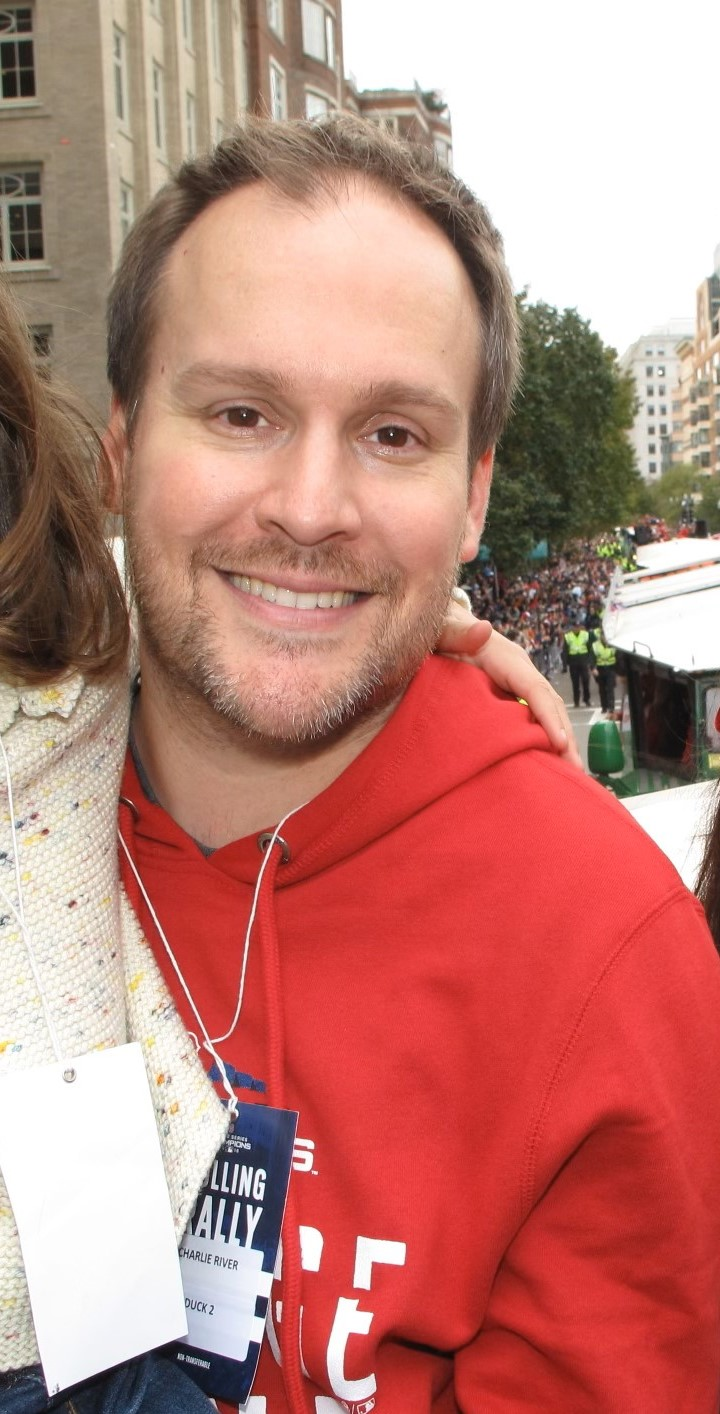
- Born: 1977 (age 48–49); Natick, Massachusetts, U.S.
- Education: University of Vermont (BS)
- Occupation: Sports executive
- Employer(s): Boston Red Sox (2004–2020); New York Mets (2020–2021)
- Spouse: Molly Scott
- Children: 2

Zack Scott (born 1977) is an American sports executive who served as the acting general manager of the New York Mets between January 2021 and September 2021.

Previously, he worked for the Boston Red Sox in different roles between 2004 and 2020, including his last two seasons as assistant general manager. In 2017, The Boston Herald described him as an analytics guru due to his work for the Boston Red Sox.

== Early life and family ==
Scott was born in 1977 in Natick, Massachusetts. He started his college education at the University of Texas-Austin with a major in computer science, but because of a family emergency he transferred to the University of Vermont where he completed his Bachelor of Science degree in mathematics with a major in statistics in 1999.

From an early age, Scott was interested in baseball and became a Red Sox fan in the '86 World Series vs. the Mets. During his high school years, he played baseball and participated in Babe Ruth League.

Zack is married to Molly Scott and has two children.

== Career ==
Between 2000 and 2004, Scott worked as an analyst for a baseball simulation software company called Diamond Mind, Inc.

In 2004, he joined the Boston Red Sox as a baseball operations intern and later, in 2005, became an assistant. Between 2006 and 2011, he served as an assistant director of baseball operations. In 2016, he became the vice president of baseball research and development.

Theo Epstein, former general manager of the Boston Red Sox, credited Zack Scott for identifying Dave Roberts as a trade target. Roberts later stole a base in a key game on the run to win the 2004 World Series, the first championship for the Red Sox in 86 years. Scott is also known for recommending Koji Uehara, the elite closer for the 2013 World Series champ Red Sox.

In December 2020, Scott joined the New York Mets as an assistant general manager and senior vice president after working with the Boston Red Sox for 17 seasons with the last two seasons as the assistant general manager.

In January 2021, he was promoted to the position of acting general manager of the New York Mets replacing Jared Porter.

In November 2021, New York Mets parted ways with him, though Mets president Sandy Alderson, called him a "good man who did excellent work".

In January 2022, Judge Eric Press acquitted Scott of a DWI charge and a lesser charge of driving while ability impaired (DWAI). After reviewing the body-camera footage, Judge Press concluded that he was not asleep (his head was down only because he was using his cell phone in his lap) and was clearly not intoxicated.

In 2022, Scott founded a consulting firm, Four Rings Sports Solutions. Through Four Rings Sports, he was a consultant for the Texas Rangers from January 2023 however is no longer retained as such. Prior to that, he consulted for both the Pittsburgh Pirates and the Pittsburgh Penguins.

Preceded by Jared Porter	New York Mets General Manager; 2021	Succeeded by Billy Eppler
