= Jared Porter =

American baseball executive (born 1979)

- Born: November 26, 1979 (age 46); Pittsburgh, Pennsylvania, U.S.
- Education: Bowdoin College (BA)
- Occupations: Sports Executive & Founder
- Employer(s): Boston Red Sox (2004–2015); Chicago Cubs (2015–2016); Arizona Diamondbacks (2016–2020); New York Mets (2020–2021)
- Relatives: Mike Sullivan (cousin)

Jared Douglas Porter (born November 26, 1979) is an American sports and business executive. As a sports executive, he has won four World Series championships, three with the Boston Red Sox (2004, 2007, and 2013) and one with the Chicago Cubs (2016). He served as the executive vice president and general manager of the New York Mets of Major League Baseball (MLB) from December 13, 2020, to January 19, 2021, but was fired after an article was published revealing inappropriate text messages Porter had sent to a female reporter.

== Early life and family ==
Porter was born in Pittsburgh, Pennsylvania, and moved to Charlotte, North Carolina, before settling with his family in Wayzata, Minnesota, where he lived from age 4–15. In Minnesota, he attended both the Wayzata Public Schools and The Blake School (Minneapolis). When he was 15, he moved with his family to Duxbury, Massachusetts, where he attended Boston College High School for 1-year before transferring to Thayer Academy in Braintree, Massachusetts. While at Thayer Academy, Porter lettered in baseball, ice hockey, tennis, and football, playing hockey with future National Hockey League players David Gove, Mike Mottau, Brooks Orpik, and Ryan Whitney. Porter attended Bowdoin College in Brunswick, Maine and graduated in 2003 with a degree in history. At Bowdoin, Porter was the captain of the ice hockey and baseball teams his senior year.

On September 1, 2001, Porter's mother, Patricia Sullivan Porter, died in a car accident in a car driven by former Thayer Academy ice hockey coach Jack Foley. She was 48 years old. The two were driving back to the South Shore of Boston from Newport, Rhode Island when the 1998 Mercedes ML320 that Foley was driving flipped and ejected both occupants. Foley survived the crash with serious injuries.

Porter is a cousin of Mike Sullivan, who has played and coached in the National Hockey League.

== Career ==
=== Cape Cod Baseball League ===
During the summers of 2002 and 2003, Porter interned in the Cape Cod Baseball League for the Brewster Whitecaps in Brewster, Massachusetts under his father, Dave Porter, who was the general manager of the Whitecaps at the time. Future MLB players Mike Avilés, Brian Bixler, Brad Davis,(baseball), Chris Dickerson (baseball), Tony Gwynn Jr., Justin James (baseball), Matt Macri, Tommy Manzella, Taylor Tankersley, and Sean White (baseball), as well as future MLB manager and Minnesota Twins bench coach Jayce Tingler, and Philadelphia Phillies first base coach Paco Figueroa played for the Whitecaps during these two seasons.

=== Boston Red Sox ===
Porter was hired by the Red Sox as an intern in Player Development and Florida Operations in January 2004 and won his first World Series title as an executive on October 27, 2004. During the 2005 season, Porter was the Amateur Scouting and Player Development intern assisting with the 2005 Major League Baseball draft, during which the Red Sox selected MLB players Jacoby Ellsbury, Craig Hansen, Clay Buchholz, Jed Lowrie, Michael Bowden (baseball), and Luis Exposito.

During the 2006 and 2007 seasons, Porter worked as the Assistant in Player Development under Ben Cherington, Mike Hazen, and Raquel Ferreira. During this time, the Red Sox had one of the top farm systems in MLB with future MLB stars such as Daniel Bard, Clay Buchholz, Jacoby Ellsbury, Jon Lester, Justin Masterson, Brandon Moss, David Murphy (baseball), Dustin Pedroia, Josh Reddick, and Anthony Rizzo playing in it. Porter won his second World Series title as an executive on October 28, 2007.

During the 2008 – 2015 seasons, Porter worked in the Red Sox Professional Scouting Department under Allard Baird. During this time, he gained a strong reputation for identifying and aggressively pursuing undervalued talent. One area of note was his love for the Independent Leagues that led to his signing of Major Leaguers Robert Coello, Rich Hill, Chris Martin, Tommy Nance (2016 with Cubs), Daniel Nava, Robby Scott, and Aaron Wilkerson out of various Independent Leagues. The two most notable signings were Nava and Hill. Nava was signed for $1 out of the Golden Baseball League after the 2007 season and went on to hit a Grand Slam on the first pitch in his first Major League at bat in 2010 and serve as a key player on the Red Sox 2013 World Series team with a .831 OPS in 536 plate appearances. Hill, who had already had a substantial Major League career was signed by Porter in 2015 while on the Long Island Ducks after a private workout at Milton High School (Massachusetts) in Milton, Massachusetts.

Porter won his third World Series title as an executive on October 30, 2013 serving as a key voice and the director of professional scouting for general manager Ben Cherington during the 2012–13 off-season that saw the Red Sox add new players Mike Carp, Ryan Dempster, Stephen Drew, Jonny Gomes, Joel Hanrahan, Brock Holt, Mike Napoli, David Ross, Koji Uehara, and Shane Victorino. Cherington said that Porter was "the person that was behind a lot of the signings we made after that 2012 season."

=== Chicago Cubs ===
Porter was hired by his former Red Sox boss Theo Epstein to work for the Chicago Cubs as Director of Professional Scouting & Special Assistant in September 2015, where, in addition to Epstein, he joined former Red Sox counterparts Jed Hoyer, Jason McLeod, Shiraz Rehman, Matt Dorey, and Kyle Evans in helping to put the Chicago Cubs 2016 World Series Championship team together. Porter won his fourth World Series title as an executive on November 2, 2016. While with the Cubs, Theo Epstein said that "He's (Porter) someone who I trust with his evaluations and his feel as much as anyone. He's (Porter) really great at making things happen as well as the final call in evaluations."

=== Arizona Diamondbacks ===
Porter was hired by Mike Hazen to work for the Arizona Diamondbacks as senior vice president and assistant general manager in November 2016 shortly after the Cubs 2016 World Series Championship, where, in addition to Hazen, he joined former Red Sox counterparts Amiel Sawdaye and Torey Lovullo. In his first year with the Diamondbacks, the team traded for J. D. Martinez at the 2017 trade deadline and went on to finish with a 93–69 record (a 24-game improvement from the 2016 season), and defeat the Colorado Rockies in the 2017 National League Wild Card Game at Chase Field before getting swept by the Los Angeles Dodgers in the 2017 National League Division Series. On December 4, 2018, Porter signed Merrill Kelly from the SK Wyverns in the Korea Baseball Organization.

=== New York Mets ===
Porter was hired by the New York Mets on December 13, 2020, to be the club's executive vice president and general manager. During his time as general manager, the Mets traded for Francisco Lindor, Carlos Carrasco, and Joey Lucchesi.

On January 18, 2021, ESPN writers Mina Kimes and Jeff Passan published an article alleging a personal relationship that Porter had with a foreign female reporter in 2016 while working for the Chicago Cubs. After many mutual and personal text messages back and forth between Porter and the reporter, he sent her over sixty short text messages without response culminating with a sexually explicit photo. At this point, the reporter responded to Porter that she felt the photo was inappropriate and offensive, to which he apologized, marking the end of their communication. Mets' owner Steve Cohen terminated Porter the next day. He was succeeded by Zack Scott in an interim position.

=== Blend ===
Porter currently works as the co-founder of Blend, a mental health and performance coaching company that works with MLB players, NHL players, NCAA men's and women's athletes, high school athletes, youth athletes, and private clients. Porter would say in 2024 that his interest in mental health stems from his own journey, including getting checked in at a Phoenix area mental health institution shortly after he was fired by the Mets.

== Personal life ==
Porter resides in Naples, Florida with his wife, Mandy. He would acknowledge in 2024 that it was an "inappropriate relationship" that led to his firing from the Mets, and that "I made the decision to send the text message that I sent. And I certainly shouldn't have done it."

Preceded by Brodie Van Wagenen	New York Mets General Manager; 2020–2021	Succeeded by Zack Scott
