= Brodie Van Wagenen =

American sports agent and former executive

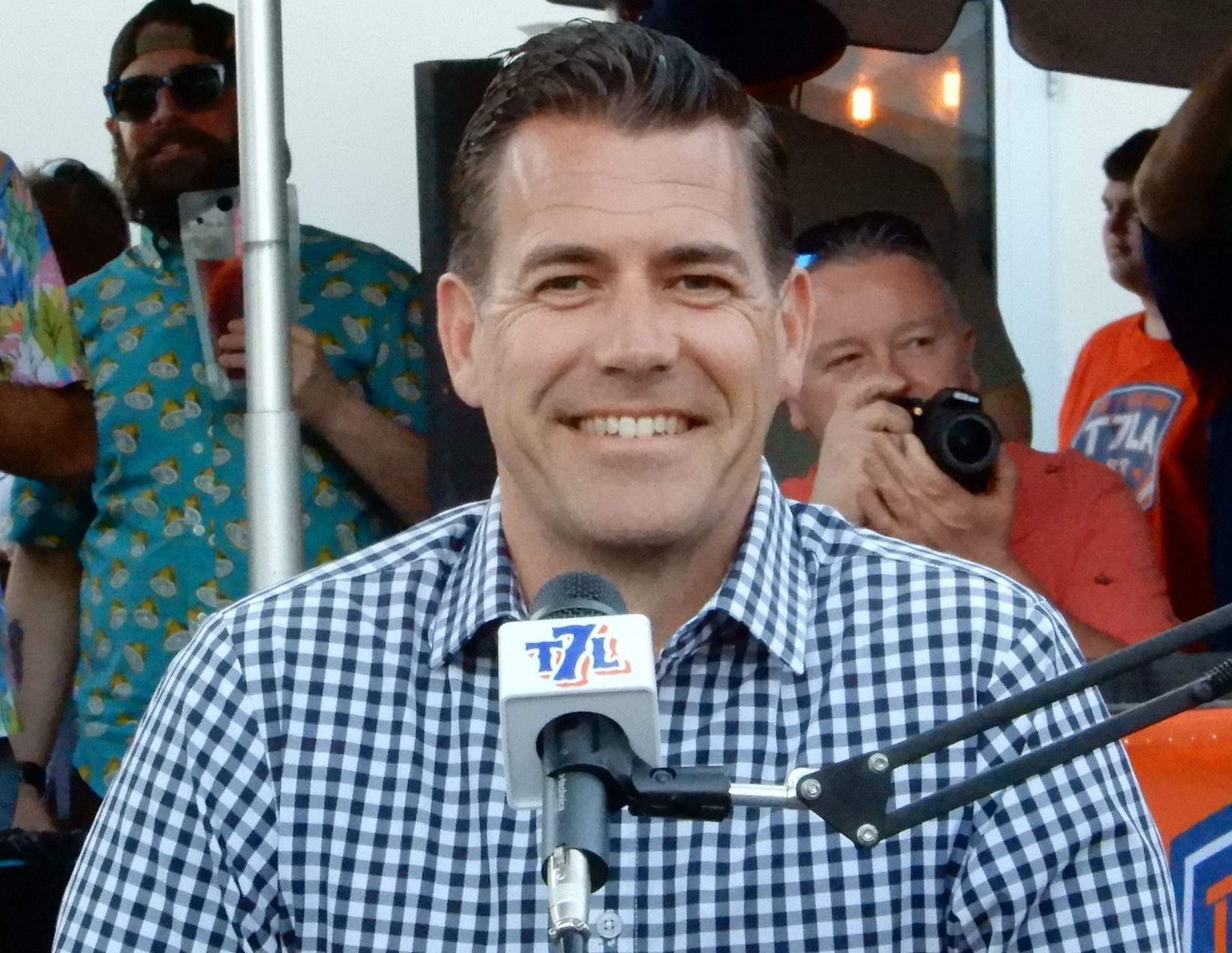
- Van Wagenen in 2019
- Born: March 9, 1974 (age 52); Encino, California, U.S.
- Education: Stanford University
- Spouse: Molly Knight (m. 1996)
- Children: 3

Brodie Van Wagenen (/ˈwæɡɛnɛn/ WAG-eh-nen; born March 9, 1974) is an American sports agent and former executive. He was formerly the general manager for the New York Mets of Major League Baseball (MLB). He previously worked at Creative Artists Agency (CAA) and served as a co-head of the baseball division at CAA Sports. He is currently an executive for Roc Nation.

== Early life ==
Van Wagenen grew up in Southern California, where he attended Crespi Carmelite High School in Encino, California, before receiving a scholarship to Stanford University. He was the starting right fielder for the Stanford Cardinal baseball team as a freshman and sophomore in 1993 and 1994. After dislocating his shoulder while swinging at a pitch from USC's Randy Flores, Van Wagenen tallied only 24 at bats in his final two seasons at Stanford. He graduated with a bachelor's degree in communication in 1996.

== Career ==
After graduating from Stanford, Van Wagenen was hired by the Chicago Bulls to sell tickets and sponsorship deals. Van Wagenen left the Bulls to work briefly for a short-lived startup which created websites for athletes.

=== Sports agent ===
Van Wagenen began his agent career at IMG working for Casey Close and Mark McCormack. His first client was Randy Flores.

At Creative Artists Agency (CAA), Van Wagenen was a Co-Head of CAA Sports' Baseball division. Van Wagenen has been noted by Forbes, and, in March 2012, Sports Business Journal named Van Wagenen to its "40 Under 40" list of "the best young talent in sports business."

For Yoenis Céspedes, Van Wagenen negotiated a three-year, $75 million contract with the New York Mets that included an opt-out after the first season (2016). The $25 million average annual value of the deal matched the highest average annual value ever for an outfielder. Cespedes opted out of his contract after the 2016 season and in November 2016 re-signed for $110 million over four years, setting records for annual average value ($27.5 million) records for an outfielder and any Mets player in franchise history and the second-highest AAV ever for a non-pitcher. In sum, it guaranteed Cespedes $137.6 million over five years with the Mets.

In December 2013, Van Wagenen negotiated a $240 million, 10-year contract for Robinson Canó with the Seattle Mariners. The deal made Cano just the fifth player to sign a contract for $200 million or more with only Alex Rodriguez ever signing a contract worth more in guaranteed salary. Cano's contract more than doubled the previous record guarantee for a second baseman, was the largest contract ever for a player who had not had a 35-homer season and was just the fifth 10-year contract of the past decade.

In 2016, Van Wagenen became the baseball agent for former Heisman Trophy winner and NFL quarterback Tim Tebow as Tebow made the transition from football to baseball. Tebow signed with the Mets. He also represented the Mets' Jacob deGrom.

=== Front office career ===
In October 2018, Van Wagenen interviewed to replace Sandy Alderson as the New York Mets' general manager. On October 29, the Mets announced the hiring of Van Wagenen as their general manager. On November 6, 2020, hours after Steve Cohen closed on the Mets purchase, Van Wagenen was fired. He was replaced by former Diamondbacks assistant general manager Jared Porter.

=== Return to representation industry ===
In January 2021, Van Wagenen was named COO and Head of Strategy and Business Development of Roc Nation Sports, the sports management division of the entertainment agency founded by Jay-Z.

== Personal life ==
Van Wagenen's wife, Molly (née Knight; no relation to baseball journalist Molly Knight), is also a graduate of and former diver at Stanford University. They have three children. Molly Van Wagenen's step-father was astronaut Neil Armstrong. Van Wagenen's father, Jeff Van Wagenen, played professional golf on the European Seniors Tour (1999–2008). Van Wagenen served on the board of directors for Stanford University's Buck/Cardinal Club from 1998–2004. Molly serves on the board of directors for the Stanford University Athletic Department.

He is a descendant of Louis DuBois, who came to the United States fleeing religious persecution in France. He is also a descendant of the Van Wagenen family of Ulster County, New York.

Preceded by Sandy Alderson	New York Mets General Manager; 2018–2020	Succeeded by Jared Porter
