= Closed-end credit =

Credit that must be repaid in full by a specified date

In finance, closed-end credit is a type of credit that should be repaid in full amount by the end of the term, by a specified date. The repayment includes all the interests and financial charges agreed at the signing of the credit agreement. Closed-end credits include all kinds of mortgage lending and car loans.

== Types ==
In case of mortgages the total is divided into monthly installments so that a person should repay certain amounts of principal plus interest. After the last repayment is made the right for the property is transferred to the borrower.

The same scheme refers to an auto loan. It is extended for a fixed period during which a person makes repayments. The latter also includes principal and interest and a borrower gains the right for a vehicle as soon as the final repayment is made. However, closed-end credits of auto type differ from the mortgage ones as they are considerably shorter and in the majority of cases have got fixed interest rates.

== Features ==
The advantage of closed-end credits is that they allow a person to build a good credit score image, provided that all their repayments are made in time. Auto loans are especially beneficial in this respect. Successful management of a closed-end credit is a demonstrative indicator for future lenders.

The peculiar feature of closed-end credits is that they preserve the same interest rate level and the loan principal is not increased after the disbursement of funds or after the partial repayment.

Opposed to closed-end credits there are also open-end credits that are also known as revolving credit lines. The most widespread among them are credit card loans.

All the types of credits in the U.S. are regulated by the laws. One of them is The Truth in Lending Act (TILA). It was implemented by the Board's Regulation Z (12 CFR Part 226) and is aimed at providing information and customer protection. It was introduced in order to spread information about all customer loans and to enforce lenders to adequately disclose information about terms and cost of a loan.

== See also ==
- Mortgage loan
- Credit score
- Title loan
- Guarantor loan
