= Certificate of Deposit Account Registry Service =

Financial service for US bank customers

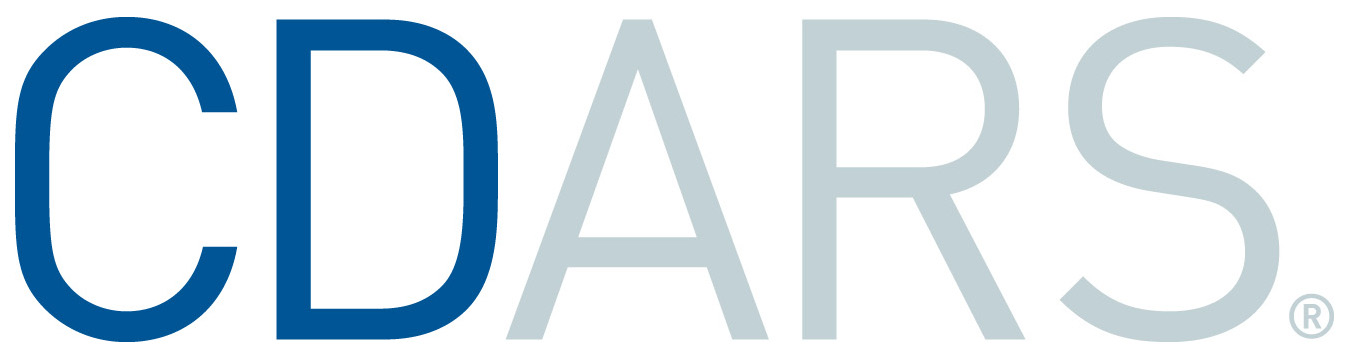
Certificate of Deposit Account Registry Service

The Certificate of Deposit Account Registry Service (CDARS) is a financial service for depositors in FDIC-insured institutions. Retail, commercial, and other US banking customers use CDARS to ensure that their large deposits are covered by Federal Deposit Insurance Corporation (FDIC) deposit insurance even for amounts greater than the standard FDIC insurance maximum per account. This is accomplished by placing the funds with CDARS which then distributes them among a network of 3000 participating banks across the United States.

Depositors are able to deal with a single bank that participates in CDARS yet avoid having funds above the FDIC deposit insurance limit of $250,000 in any one bank. Retail and commercial banks are members of the CDARS network.

== How it works ==
The service can place multiple millions of dollars in deposits per customer and make all of it qualify for FDIC insurance coverage.

The FDIC has confirmed that deposits placed through deposit placement services offered by the IntraFi Network (such as CDARS for certificates of deposit (CDs) or ICS for demand deposits and money market accounts) are eligible for “pass-through” FDIC insurance.

The FDIC strongly recommends that every depositor (individuals, businesses, non-profits, and municipalities) “protect all (their) deposits with FDIC insurance.” The FDIC does not recommend any particular approach to do this.

CDARS and IntraFi are for-profit organizations. They are not endorsed by or affiliated with any governmental agency.
