= Charles Sawyer =

Charles Sawyer may refer to:

- Charles E. Sawyer (1860–1924), personal physician to president Warren G. Harding
- Charles Henry Sawyer (photographer) (1868–1954), American painter and photographer
- Charles H. Sawyer (politician) (1840–1908), governor of New Hampshire
- Charles H. Sawyer (neuroendocrinologist) (1915–2006), American neuroendocrinologist
- Charles Manville Sawyer (1876–1950), first governor (president) of the Federal Reserve Bank of Kansas City
- Charles Sawyer (sportsman) (1856–1921), English cricketer and rugby union footballer
- Charles W. Sawyer (1887–1979), American lawyer, diplomat and U.S. secretary of commerce
- Charles L. Sawyer (1860–1918), American lawyer and politician, member of the Minnesota House of Representatives
- Charles Baldwin Sawyer (1895–1964), co-inventor of the commercial quartz crystal manufacturing process
