= Leedy =

Leedy is a surname. Notable people with the surname include:

- Denoe Leedy (1900–1964), American classical pianist, music educator and music journalist
- Gene Leedy (1928–2018), American architect
- Harold Gavin Leedy (1892–1989), American Federal Reserve president
- James K. Leedy (1925–1983), American politician
- John W. Leedy (1849–1935), American politician
- Robert Franklin Leedy (1863–1924), American lawyer, soldier and politician
- Ulysses G. Leedy (1867–1931), founder of the Leedy Manufacturing Company
- Walter C. Leedy (d. 2006), American architectural historian
