= Charles H. Sawyer =

Charles H. Sawyer may refer to:

- Charles H. Sawyer (politician) (1840–1908), governor of New Hampshire
- Charles Henry Sawyer (photographer) (1868–1954), American painter and photographer
- Charles H. Sawyer (neuroendocrinologist) (1915-2006), American neuroendocrinologist
