= Federal Reserve Bank of Kansas City Omaha Branch =

Coordinates: 35°28′14″N 97°31′03″W

The Federal Reserve Bank of Kansas City Omaha Branch is one of three branches of the Federal Reserve Bank of Kansas City. The branch, which is in Omaha, Nebraska, opened on September 4, 1917.

== Current Board of Directors ==
The following people are on the board of directors as of 2023:

=== Appointed by the Federal Reserve Bank ===
Appointed by the Federal Reserve Bank
Name	Title	Term Expires
Dwayne W. Sieck	Managing Principal; Farnam Street Real Estate Capital; Omaha, Nebraska	2023
Zac Karpf	President; Platte Valley Bank; Scottsbluff, Nebraska	2024
Susan L. Martin	President & Secretary-Treasurer; Nebraska State AFL-CIO; Lincoln, Nebraska	2024
Clark Lauritzen	Chairman & President; First National Bank of Omaha; Omaha, Nebraska	2025

=== Appointed by the Board of Governors ===
Appointed by the Board of Governors
Name	Title	Term Expires
Carmen Tapio	Owner, President and Chief Executive Officer; North End Teleservices, LLC; Omaha, Nebraska	2023
Joanne Li	Chancellor; University of Nebraska at Omaha; Omaha, Nebraska	2024
L. Javier Fernandez (Chair)	President & Chief Executive Officer; Omaha Public Power District; Omaha, Nebraska	2025

== See also ==
- Federal Reserve Act
- Federal Reserve System
- Federal Reserve Bank
- Federal Reserve Districts
- Federal Reserve Branches
- Federal Reserve Bank of Kansas City
- Federal Reserve Bank of Kansas City Denver Branch
- Federal Reserve Bank of Kansas City Oklahoma City Branch
- Structure of the Federal Reserve System
