= Federal Reserve Bank of Kansas City Oklahoma City Branch =

Coordinates: 35°28′14″N 97°31′03″W

The Federal Reserve Bank of Kansas Oklahoma City Branch is one of the 4 branches of the Federal Reserve Bank of Kansas City. The branch which is in Oklahoma City opened on August 2, 1920 at the Continental Building before moving in 1923 to a new building at the corner Harvey and Third streets.

== Current Board of Directors ==
The following people are on the board of directors as of 2023:

=== Appointed by the Federal Reserve Bank ===
Appointed by the Federal Reserve Bank
Name	Title	Term Expires
Brady Sidwell	Owner and Principal; Sidwell Strategies, LLC; Enid, Oklahoma	2023
J. Walter Duncan, IV	President; Duncan Oil Properties, Inc. Oklahoma City, Oklahoma	2024
Mark Burrage	Chief Executive Officer; FirstBank; Atoka, Oklahoma	2025
Terry Salmon	President; Computer System Designers; Oklahoma City, Oklahoma	2025

=== Appointed by the Board of Governors ===
Appointed by the Board of Governors
Name	Title	Term Expires
Katrina Washington (Chair)	Executive Director of Neighborhood Housing Services & Owner; Stratos Realty Group; Oklahoma City, Oklahoma	2023
Rhonda Hooper	President & Chief Executive Officer; Jordan Advertising; Oklahoma City, Oklahoma	2024
Dana S. Weber	Chief Executive Officer & Chairman of the Board; Webco Industries, Inc. Sand Springs, Oklahoma	2025

== See also ==
- Federal Reserve Act
- Federal Reserve System
- Federal Reserve Bank
- Federal Reserve Districts
- Federal Reserve Branches
- Federal Reserve Bank of Kansas City
- Federal Reserve Bank of Kansas City Denver Branch
- Federal Reserve Bank of Kansas City Omaha Branch
- Structure of the Federal Reserve System
