= Mark Drabenstott =

American banker

Mark Drabenstott is a vice-president of the Federal Reserve Bank of Kansas City and the director of the Center for the Study of Rural America (CSRA). Drabenstott is also chair of the National Policy Association's Food and Agriculture Committee and a director of the National Bureau of Economic Research at Harvard University. Drabenstott earned an MS in agricultural economics from Iowa State University in 1980 and a PhD there in 1981.

== Career ==
Drabenstott joined the bank in 1981 and became a vice-president in 1990. He became director of the CSRA in 1998.

He has served as an advisor for the World Bank and has testified before Congress on at least 10 occasions.

== Selected works ==
- Rural America in a New Century was an October 1999 report by Mark Drabenstott, for the Center for the Study of Rural America's newsletter The Main Street Economist.

In the introduction the report notes that the farm economy is in a deep slump and that there are major economic challenges facing rural communities within the U.S. The second section is titled, "A new farm crisis?" and argues that it is important that the government expands its assistance to rural communities. The article also questions whether concentrated and corporatized agriculture will be beneficial to the majority of rural communities and states, "Agricultural policy no longer cures rural ills."

- "Rethinking Federal Policy for Regional Economic Development"
- Drabenstott, Mark (2016). "New Policies for a New Rural America". International Regional Science Review. 24 (1): 3–15. doi:10.1177/016001701761012962. ISSN 0160-0176. S2CID 155022839.
- Mark R. Drabenstott; Lynn Gibson (1988). Rural America in Transition. Federal Reserve Bank of Kansas City, Research Division. OCLC 18124844.
