= Federal Reserve Bank of Kansas City Denver Branch =

Coordinates: 39°44′50″N 104°59′44″W

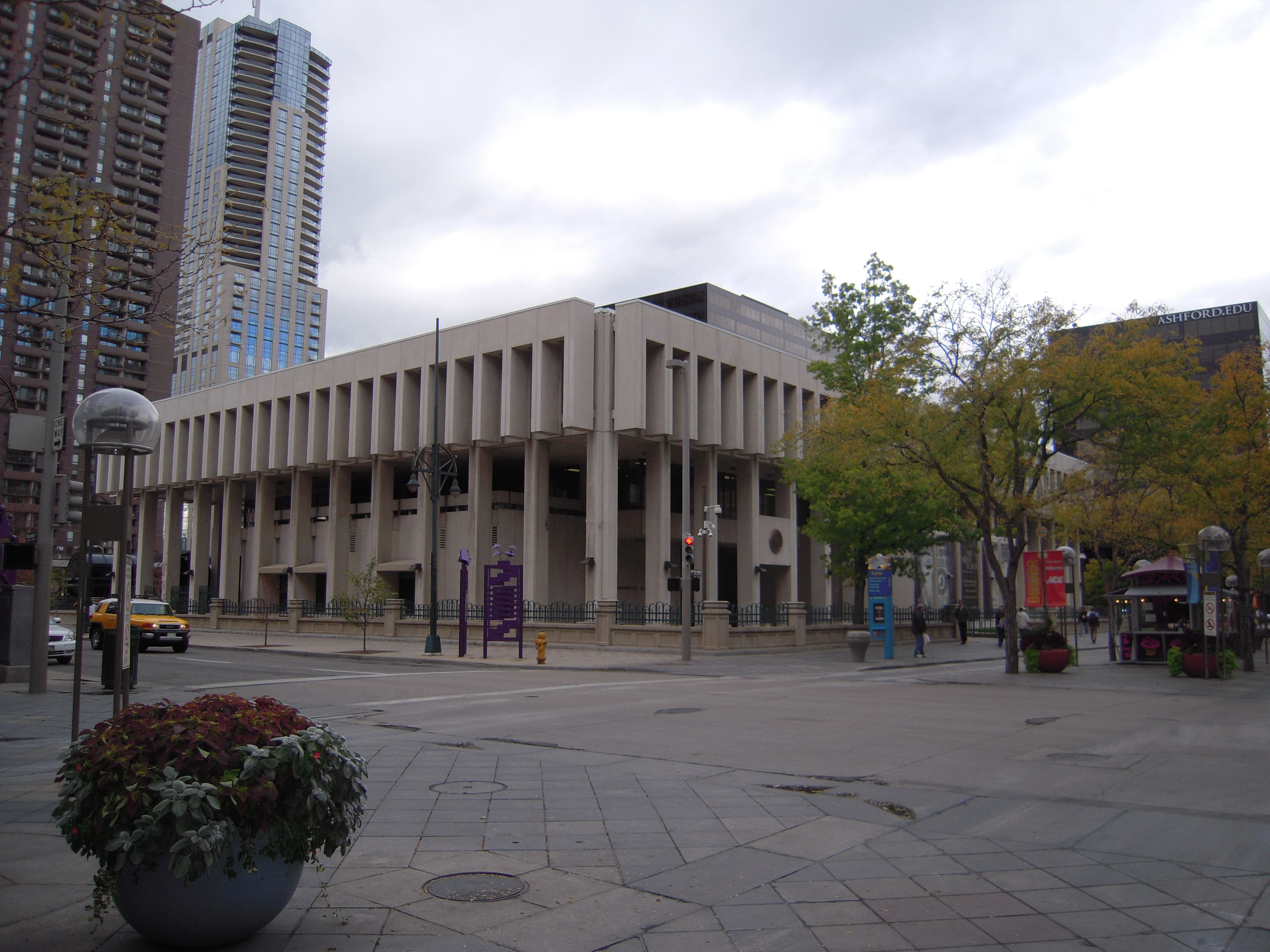
Federal Reserve Bank of Kansas City Denver Branch

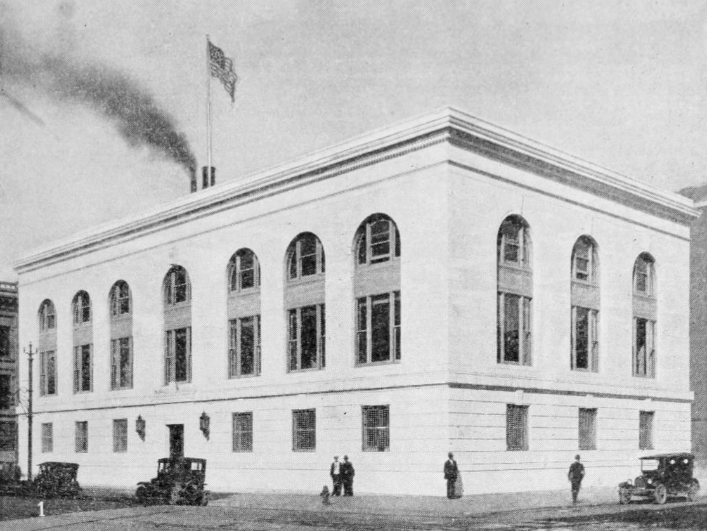
Original building, c. 1927

The Federal Reserve Bank of Kansas City Denver Branch is second largest of three branches of the Federal Reserve Bank of Kansas City. The Denver branch opened January 14, 1918 on 17th Street before moving in 1968 to the 16th Street Mall.

== Current Board of Directors ==
The following people are on the board of directors as of 2023:

=== Appointed by the Federal Reserve Bank ===
Appointed by the Federal Reserve Bank
Name	Title	Term Expires
Rachel Gerlach	Chief Credit Officer; Alpine Bank; Glenwood Springs, Colorado	2023
Nicole Glaros	Founder & Chief Executive Officer; Phos; Boulder, Colorado	2024
Chris Wright	Chief Executive Officer; Liberty Energy; Denver, Colorado	2024
John J. Coyne III	Chairman, Chief Executive Officer & President; Big Horn Federal Savings Bank; Greybull, Wyoming	2025

=== Appointed by the Board of Governors ===
Appointed by the Board of Governors
Name	Title	Term Expires
Navin Dimond (Chair)	Founder & Chief Executive Officer; Stonebridge Companies; Denver, Colorado	2023
Janice J. Lucero	President & Chief Executive Officer; Motor Vehicle Division Express; Albuquerque, New Mexico	2024
Del Esparza	Chief Executive Officer; Esparza Digital & Advertising; Albuquerque, New Mexico	2025

== Money Museum ==
The Denver branch houses the 7,000-square-foot Money Museum.

== See also ==
- Denver Mint
- Federal Reserve Act
- Federal Reserve System
- Federal Reserve Bank
- Federal Reserve Districts
- Federal Reserve Branches
- Federal Reserve Bank of Kansas City Oklahoma City Branch
- Federal Reserve Bank of Kansas City Omaha Branch
- Structure of the Federal Reserve System
