= 1902 Kansas gubernatorial election =

- November 4, 1902
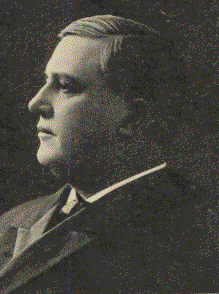

Nominee	Willis J. Bailey	W. H. Craddock
Party	Republican	Democratic
Popular vote	159,242	117,148
Percentage	55.45%	40.79%
- County results Bailey: 40–50% 50–60% 60–70% 70–80% 80–90% Craddock: 40–50% 50–60% 60–70%
Governor before election
William Eugene Stanley
Republican
Elected Governor
Willis J. Bailey
Republican

The 1902 Kansas gubernatorial election was held on November 4, 1902. Republican nominee Willis J. Bailey defeated Democratic nominee W. H. Craddock with 55.45% of the vote.

== General election ==
=== Candidates ===
Major party candidates

- Willis J. Bailey, Republican
- W. H. Craddock, Democratic

Other candidates

- F. W. Emerson, Prohibition
- A. S. McAllister, Socialist
- James H. Lathrop, People's

=== Results ===
1902 Kansas gubernatorial election
Party	Candidate	Votes	%	±%
Republican	Willis J. Bailey	159,242	55.45%	
Democratic	W. H. Craddock	117,148	40.79%	
Prohibition	F. W. Emerson	6,065	2.11%	
Socialist	A. S. McAllister	4,078	1.42%	
Populist	James H. Lathrop	635	0.22%	
Majority		42,094		
Turnout				
Republican hold		Swing		
