= Thomas M. Hoenig =

American economist (born 1946)

Tom Hoenig
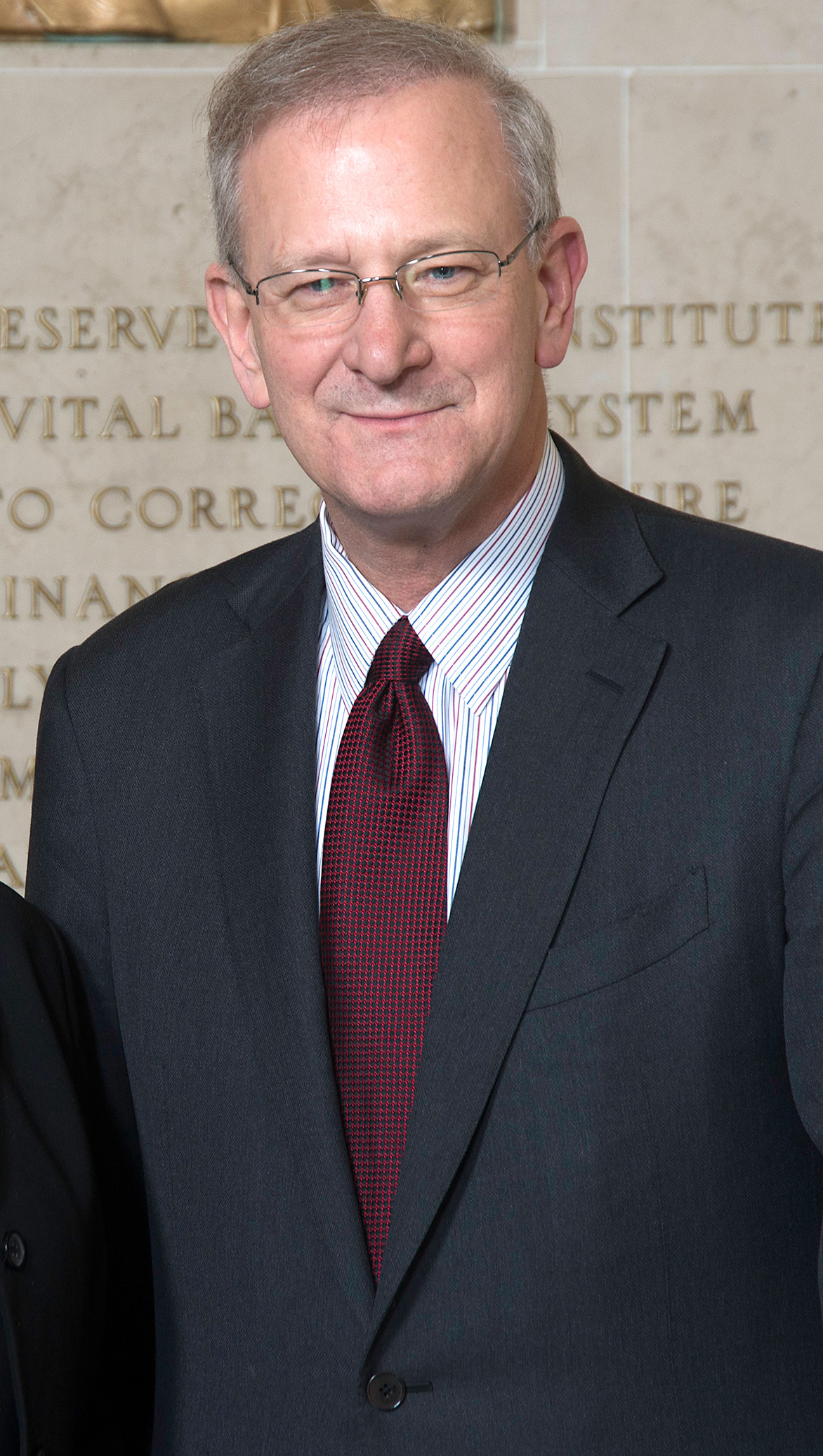
- Hoenig in 2014

President of the Federal Reserve Bank of Kansas City
- In office October 1, 1991 – October 1, 2011
- Preceded by: J. Roger Guffey
- Succeeded by: Esther George

Personal details
- Born: Thomas Michael Hoenig; September 6, 1946 (age 80) Fort Madison, Iowa, U.S.
- Party: Independent
- Education: Benedictine College (BA); Iowa State University (MA, PhD)

Thomas Michael Hoenig (born September 6, 1946) is a Distinguished Senior Fellow at the Mercatus Center. He became a director of the Federal Deposit Insurance Corporation on April 16, 2012, and was vice chairman from November 30, 2012, to April 30, 2018. From 1991 to 2011, he was the chief executive of the Tenth District Federal Reserve Bank, in Kansas City, United States. In 2010, he was a voting member of the Federal Open Market Committee, one of five of the twelve Federal Reserve Bank presidents that sit on the committee on a yearly rotating basis. He is known as an "anti-inflation hawk".

== Life and career ==
Hoenig was born in Fort Madison, Iowa, where his father owned a plumbing business. He was raised Catholic and attended Catholic schools. Hoenig earned a B.A. in economics and mathematics from St. Benedict's College (now Benedictine College), Atchison, Kansas, and M.A. and Ph.D. degrees in economics from Iowa State University.

Hoenig joined the Federal Reserve Bank of Kansas City in 1973 as an economist in the banking supervision area. He was named a vice president in 1981 and senior vice president in 1986.

According to Fed salary figures released for 2010, Hoenig earned $374,400 per year, in the mid-range for the twelve regional bank chairs and considerably more than Fed chair Ben Bernanke ($199,700), whose pay is limited by law.

He has served as an instructor of economics at the University of Missouri-Kansas City and lectured on the U.S. banking and regulatory system for the People's Bank of China. Hoenig is a member of the Board of Trustees of the Ewing Marion Kauffman Foundation and serves on the boards of directors of Midwest Research Institute and Union Station.

On March 25, 2011, Hoenig announced his intent to retire on October 1, 2011, as required under the Federal Reserve Board's mandatory retirement rules for Federal Reserve Bank Presidents. The retirement marks 20 years as president for Hoenig whose first day as Bank president was October 1, 1991, and 38 years of total service to the Federal Reserve. On April 16, 2012, Hoenig was sworn in as vice chairman and member of the board of directors of the Federal Deposit Insurance Corporation. On April 27, 2018, Hoenig announced that he was stepping down from his role effective April 30, 2018. On May 13, 2019, he joined the Mercatus Center as a Distinguished Senior Fellow.

== Speech/criticism ==
On March 6, 2009, Hoenig made a speech entitled 'Too Big Has Failed' critical of the approach taken to the capitalization and liquidity crises and suggesting alternate approaches.

Again on August 13, 2010, in a speech in Lincoln, Nebraska, Hoenig criticized the then current Federal Reserve action of a zero policy rate calling it "...a dangerous gamble." He also stated, "There may be ways to accelerate GDP growth, but, in my view, highly expansionary monetary policy is not a good option."

Other offices
Preceded by J. Roger Guffey	President of the Federal Reserve Bank of Kansas City; 1991–2011	Succeeded by Esther George
