= Willis J. Bailey =

American politician

Willis Bailey
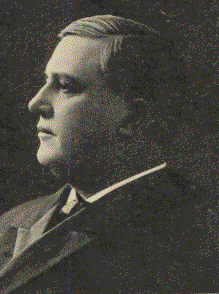

President of the Federal Reserve Bank of Kansas City
- In office July 1, 1922 – January 7, 1932
- Preceded by: Jo Miller
- Succeeded by: George Hamilton

16th Governor of Kansas
- In office January 12, 1903 – January 9, 1905
- Lieutenant: David Hanna
- Preceded by: William Stanley
- Succeeded by: Edward W. Hoch

Member of the U.S. House of Representatives from Kansas's at-large district
- In office March 4, 1899 – March 4, 1901
- Preceded by: Jeremiah D. Botkin
- Succeeded by: Charles Scott

Personal details
- Born: Willis Joshua Bailey; October 12, 1854 Carroll County, Illinois, U.S.
- Died: May 19, 1932 (aged 77) Mission Hills, Kansas, U.S.
- Party: Republican
- Spouse: Ida Albert Weede
- Education: University of Illinois at Urbana-Champaign

Willis Joshua Bailey (October 12, 1854 – May 19, 1932) was an American politician and Republican United States representative from Kansas and the 16th governor of Kansas.

Born in Carroll County, Illinois, Bailey attended the common schools, Mount Carroll High School, and the University of Illinois. He married Ida B. Weede on June 9, 1903, and had two stepchildren.

Bailey moved to Nemaha County, Kansas, in 1879, and became a successful farmer, rancher, and banker. He and his father founded the town of Baileyville, Kansas in 1880. He served as member of the Kansas House of Representatives from 1888 to 1890. He was president of the Republican State League in 1893. He served as member of the Kansas State Board of Agriculture from 1895 to 1899.

Bailey was elected as a Republican to the Fifty-sixth Congress (March 4, 1899 – March 3, 1901). He was not a candidate for renomination in 1900 to the Fifty-seventh Congress.

In 1902 Bailey won the Republican gubernatorial nomination and the general election and served as Governor of Kansas from 1903 to 1905. During his tenure, construction on the state capitol was completed, railroad commissioners and the office of state printer became elective positions, and a law banning gambling devices was sanctioned.

Bailey moved to Atchison, Kansas, in 1907 and engaged in the banking business. He was elected a director of the Federal Reserve Bank of Kansas City, Missouri, in 1914, and then governor of the bank in 1922, and served until his death.

Bailey died in Mission Hills, Kansas, May 19, 1932. He is interred at Mount Vernon Cemetery, Atchison, Kansas.

U.S. House of Representatives
| Preceded by Jeremiah D. Botkin | Member of the U.S. House of Representatives from Kansas's at-large congressional district 1899–1901 | Succeeded by Charles Scott |
Party political offices
| Preceded by William Stanley | Republican nominee for Governor of Kansas; 1902 | Succeeded by Edward W. Hoch |
Political offices
| Preceded by William Stanley | Governor of Kansas; 1903–1905 | Succeeded by Edward W. Hoch |
Other offices
| Preceded by Jo Miller | President of the Federal Reserve Bank of Kansas City; 1922–1932 | Succeeded by George Hamilton |
