= George Henry Hamilton =

American politician (1875–1948)

George Hamilton

Mayor of Wichita, Kansas
- In office January 13, 1922 – August 22, 1922
- Preceded by: Wallace C. Kemp
- Succeeded by: William Coffin Coleman

President of the Federal Reserve Bank of Kansas City
- In office January 7, 1932 – February 28, 1941
- Preceded by: Willis Bailey
- Succeeded by: Harold Leedy

Personal details
- Born: George Henry Hamilton; April 4, 1875; Wellington, Illinois, U.S.
- Died: January 19, 1948 (aged 72); Wichita, Kansas, U.S.

George Henry Hamilton (April 4, 1875 – January 19, 1948) was president of the Federal Reserve Bank of Kansas City from 1932 to 1941.

Hamilton served three terms in the Illinois legislature. In 1912 he purchased the State Savings Bank of Wichita, Kansas. After it merged with Fourth National Bank he rose to president of that bank.

He was a Wichita City commissioner from 1921 to 1922 and Wichita mayor in 1922.

After retiring from the bank on February 28, 1941, he returned to Wichita where he was a vice president at Fourth National Bank until his death.

Other offices
| Preceded by Willis Bailey | President of the Federal Reserve Bank of Kansas City; 1932–1941 | Succeeded by Harold Leedy |
