= J. Roger Guffey =

American businessman

Roger Guffey

President of the Federal Reserve Bank of Kansas City
- In office March 1, 1976 – September 30, 1991
- Preceded by: George H. Clay
- Succeeded by: Thomas M. Hoenig

Personal details
- Born: September 11, 1929; Kingston, Missouri, U.S.
- Died: April 15, 2009 (aged 79); Scottsdale, Arizona, U.S.
- Education: University of Missouri (business administration); University of Missouri School of Law(JD)

J. Roger Guffey (September 11, 1929 – April 15, 2009) was president of the United States Federal Reserve Bank of Kansas City from 1976 to 1991.

== Early life ==
Guffey was born in Kingston, Missouri. His father was a farmer and rural mail carrier while his mother was a housewife. He received a degree in business administration from the University of Missouri in 1952, worked in the intelligence services in Germany, and then graduated from the University of Missouri School of Law in 1958.

== Career ==
He was a partner at the Kansas City firm Fallon, Guffey and Jenkins. He was named the general counsel for the Kansas City Federal Reserve in 1968 after being recruited to do so by then Kansas City Federal Reserve Bank President George H. Clay. In 1973, he became senior vice president of the Administrative Services Division and became president of the bank on March 1, 1976. Guffey was a member of the Federal Open Market Committee in October 1979.

Among Guffey's contributions was starting the Bank's Jackson Hole, Wyoming, Symposium which began as an agricultural symposium in 1978 but had become broader when it moved to Jackson Hole in 1982.

== Retirement ==
Guffey retired in September 1991. A theatre at the bank's 1 Memorial Drive building is named for him.

== Publications ==
Guffey wrote several articles for the Economic Review:

- Regulation Tomorrow: Toward a New Framework for Competition
- The Federal Reserve's Role in Promoting Economic Growth
- After Deregulation: The Regulatory Role of the Federal Reserve
- Quick-fix Economies: A look at the Issues
- Conduct of U.S. Monetary Policy: Recent Problems and Issues

Other offices
Preceded by George H. Clay	President of the Federal Reserve Bank of Kansas City; 1976–1991	Succeeded by Thomas M. Hoenig
