= Esther George =

American banking official (born 1958)

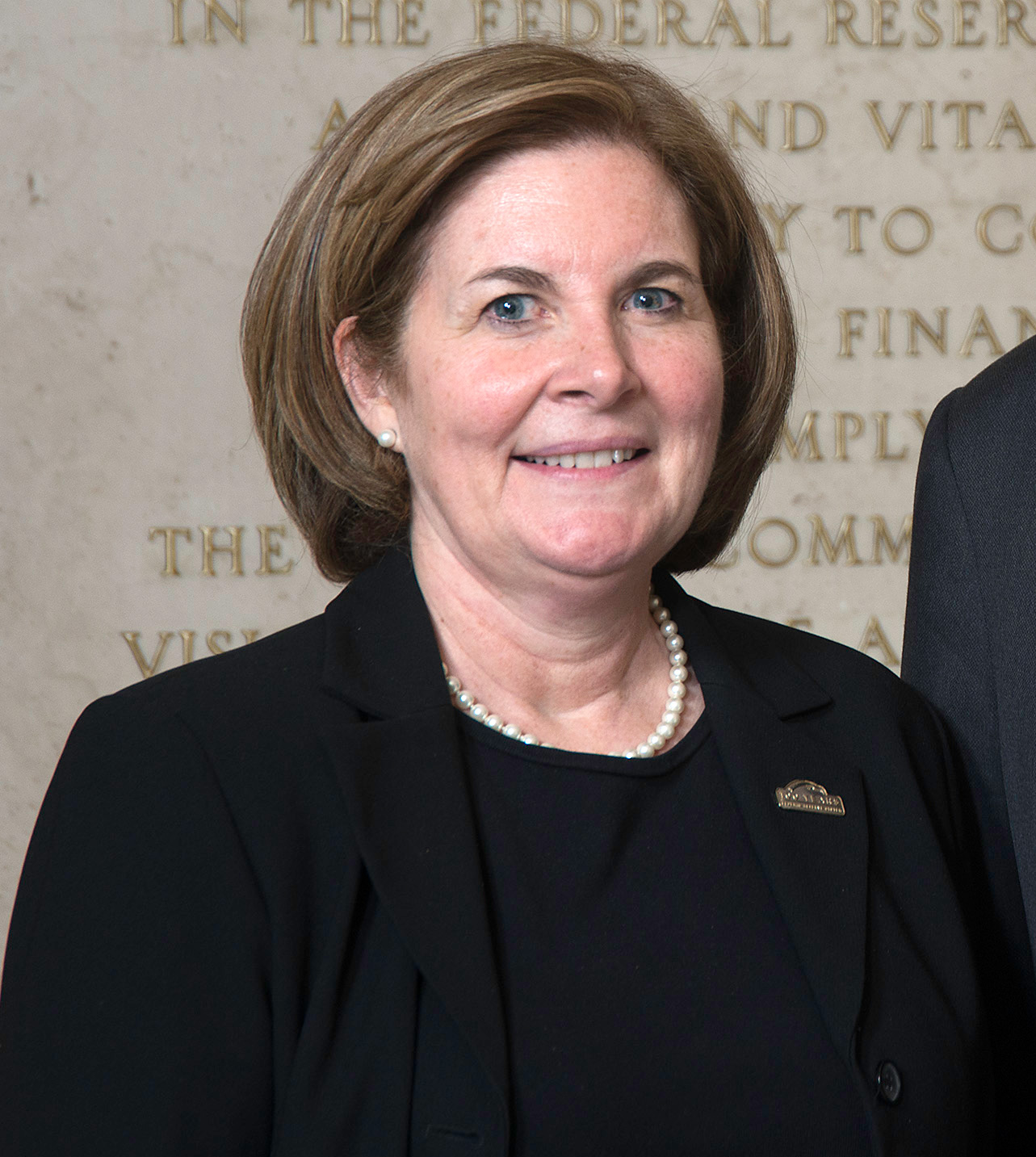
- George in 2014

President of the Federal Reserve Bank of Kansas City
- In office October 1, 2011 – January 31, 2023
- Preceded by: Thomas M. Hoenig
- Succeeded by: Kelly Dubbert (Acting)

Personal details
- Born: January 15, 1958 (age 68) Faucett, Missouri, U.S.
- Education: Missouri Western State University (BBA); University of Missouri, Kansas City (MBA)

Esther L. George (born January 15, 1958, in Faucett, Missouri) is the former president and chief executive of the Federal Reserve Bank of Kansas City from 2011 until 2023.

George is a native of Faucett, Missouri, U.S., and received a BSBA degree in Business Administration from Missouri Western State University and an MBA degree from the University of Missouri-Kansas City. She is a graduate of the American Bankers Association's Stonier Graduate School of Banking and the Stanford Graduate School of Business.

She joined the Federal Reserve Bank of Kansas City in 1982 and held various leadership positions with the Bank, including in the Bank's research support functions, Public Affairs and Human Resources. In 2001 she became the bank's senior vice president in the Bank's Division of Supervision and Risk Management. In 2009 she was named executive vice president in charge of the unit. She is a former chair of the Federal Reserve System's Community Banking Organizations Management Group.

She was appointed to the Kansas City Fed President position on October 1, 2011. She retired on January 31, 2023, after reaching the mandatory retirement age for Federal Reserve Bank Presidents.

George was named the 2023 Harry S Truman Public Service Award Recipient, an award established in 1974 by the city of Independence, which is presented annually to an American citizen who “typifies and possesses President Truman’s qualities of dedication, industry, ability, honesty and integrity.”

Other offices
Preceded by Thomas M. Hoenig	President of the Federal Reserve Bank of Kansas City; 2011–2023	Succeeded by Kelly Dubbert; Acting
