= George H. Clay =

American businessman

George Clay

President of the Federal Reserve Bank of Kansas City
- In office March 1, 1961 – February 29, 1976
- Preceded by: Harold Leedy
- Succeeded by: J. Roger Guffey

Personal details
- Born: February 14, 1911; Kansas City, Kansas, U.S.
- Died: October 11, 1995 (aged 84)
- Education: Metropolitan Community College, Missouri; William Jewell College (BA); University of Missouri, Columbia (LLB)

George H. Clay (February 14, 1911 – October 11, 1995) was president of the Federal Reserve Bank of Kansas City from 1961 to 1976.

== Life and career ==
Clay was born in Kansas City, Kansas, attended Kansas City Junior College, William Jewell College and received a law degree from the University of Missouri School of Law.

In 1944 he joined Trans World Airlines in Kansas City as an assistant director of state affairs and rose to become TWA's vice president of administrative services. He played important roles in developing TWA's facilities at John F. Kennedy International Airport in New York City and establishing the Kansas City Overhaul Base that became the basis for Kansas City International Airport.

In 1958 he left TWA to become general counsel for the Kansas City Federal Reserve and became president in 1961.

Other offices
Preceded by Harold Leedy	President of the Federal Reserve Bank of Kansas City; 1961–1976	Succeeded by J. Roger Guffey
