= Walter C. Leedy =

American academic and medievalist

Walter C. Leedy, Jr. was an American academic and medievalist. He worked as an associate professor in the Art department of Cleveland State University, where he taught both art and architectural history. While holding this position he also taught at the Maxine Goodman Levin College of Urban Affairs.

Leedy died on the 8th November, 2006, as a consequence of a stroke.

== Early life and education ==
Leedy was born in Detroit and raised in Dearborn. He did both his undergraduate and postgraduate studies, both specialising in architecture, at the University of Michigan. His Master's dissertation, completed in 1968, is titled 'Polish double nave churches of Casimir the Great'.

Leedy received his PhD in the History of European Art from the Courtauld Institute of Art, his specialisation being Medieval Art and Architecture.

== Cleveland architecture and local history ==
Leedy dedicated much of his life to preserving and furthering public interest in local arts and architecture in Cleveland, Ohio.

Leedy accumulated a collection of almost 8,000 postcards which largely charted the development of architecture in Cleveland. These postcards were digitised for the Postcards of Cleveland Memory Project.

In 2006, Leedy established the Cleveland Historical Materials Library Endowment (also known as the Walter C Leedy, Jr. Endowment Fund) "for the purchase of local history materials for the Cleveland State University Library's Special Collections department".

In 2009 Leedy initiated a campaign to protect Depression-era murals and sculptures from the Valleyview Estates housing complex in Tremont, designed in 1940 and commissioned by the WPA Federal Art Project. Leedy died before the project was completed, but the artworks were saved and installed around the city, including at the Cuyahoga Metropolitan Housing Authority offices.

In his 2012 book, Eric Mendelsohn's Park Synagogue: Architecture and Community, Leedy "carefully examines the construction of the Park Synagogue in Cleveland Heights, Ohio, during the middle of the twentieth century".

== Accolades ==
Leedy received the Western Reserve Award, for contributions to the architectural history of Ohio, in 1992, for his text Cleveland Builds an Art Museum: Patronage, Politics and Architecture 1884–1916.

== Selected works ==
=== Books ===
- Fan Vaulting, 1980
- Terminal Tower, Tower City Center, 1990
- Cleveland Builds an Art Museum: Patronage, Politics and Architecture 1884–1916, 1991
- Eric Mendelsohn's Park Synagogue: Architecture and Community, 2012

=== Photographs and archives ===
Photographs contributed by Walter Leedy to the Conway Library are currently being digitised by the Courtauld Institute of Art, as part of the Courtauld Connects project.

An oral history interview with Leedy was collected by Cleveland State University in 2006, and his papers are archived at Cleveland State University Special Collections.
