= Charles Manville Sawyer =

Charles Sawyer

President of the Federal Reserve Bank of Kansas City
- In office October 16, 1914 – January 4, 1916
- Preceded by: Position established
- Succeeded by: Jo Miller

Personal details
- Born: Charles Manville Sawyer; September 17, 1866; Streator, Illinois, U.S.
- Died: September 26, 1950 (aged 84); Hollywood, California, U.S.

Charles Manville Sawyer (September 17, 1866 – September 26, 1950) was the first governor (president) of the Federal Reserve Bank of Kansas City from 1914 to 1916.

Sawyer was born on a farm near Streator, Illinois. In 1887 he moved to Norton, Kansas where he was a cashier at the First National Bank of Norton.

After serving a stint as a bank examiner he became president of the Norton bank, president of the Kansas Bankers Association in 1898 and was appointed by George H. Hodges to be Kansas Bank Commissioner in 1913. In 1914 he was named to be president of the Federal Reserve. In 1916 he swapped positions with Jo Zach Miller Jr. with Miller, who was chairman of the Kansas City Federal Reserve.

He died in Hollywood, California.

Other offices
New office	President of the Federal Reserve Bank of Kansas City; 1914–1916	Succeeded by Jo Miller
