= Federal Reserve Bank of Kansas City =

Member Bank of Federal Reserve

Coordinates: 39°4′33″N 94°35′9″W

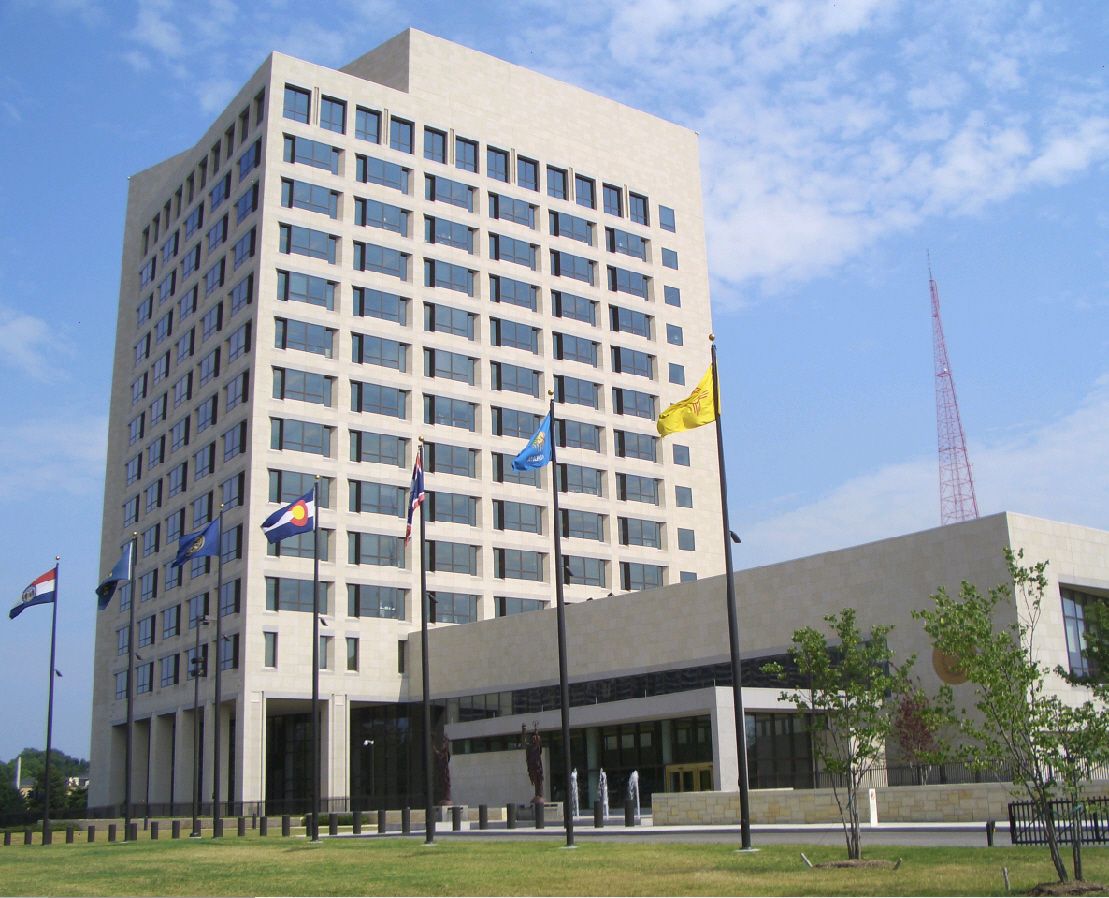
- The Federal Reserve Bank of Kansas City in 2008
- Central bank of: Tenth District: Colorado; Kansas; Nebraska; Oklahoma; Wyoming Parts of: Missouri; New Mexico
- Headquarters: 1 Memorial Drive; Kansas City, Missouri, U.S.
- Established: May 18, 1914 (112 years ago)
- President: Jeffrey Schmid
- Website: kansascityfed.org
- The Federal Reserve Bank of Kansas City is one of 12 regional banks that make up the Federal Reserve System

The Federal Reserve Bank of Kansas City is one of the twelve Federal Reserve Banks of the United States. It is responsible for the Tenth District of the Federal Reserve System, which encompasses Colorado, Kansas, Nebraska, Oklahoma, Wyoming, and portions of western Missouri and northern New Mexico. The district is headquartered in Kansas City, Missouri, and has branch offices in Denver, Oklahoma City, and Omaha. The bank's chief executive officer and president is Jeffrey Schmid.

It is second only to the Federal Reserve Bank of San Francisco in size of geographic area served. Missouri is the only state with two main Federal Reserve Banks; the other is located in St. Louis. All Federal Reserve Notes issued by the bank are identified by "J" on the face of one and two dollar bills and the J10 on the face of other currency.

== Headquarters buildings ==
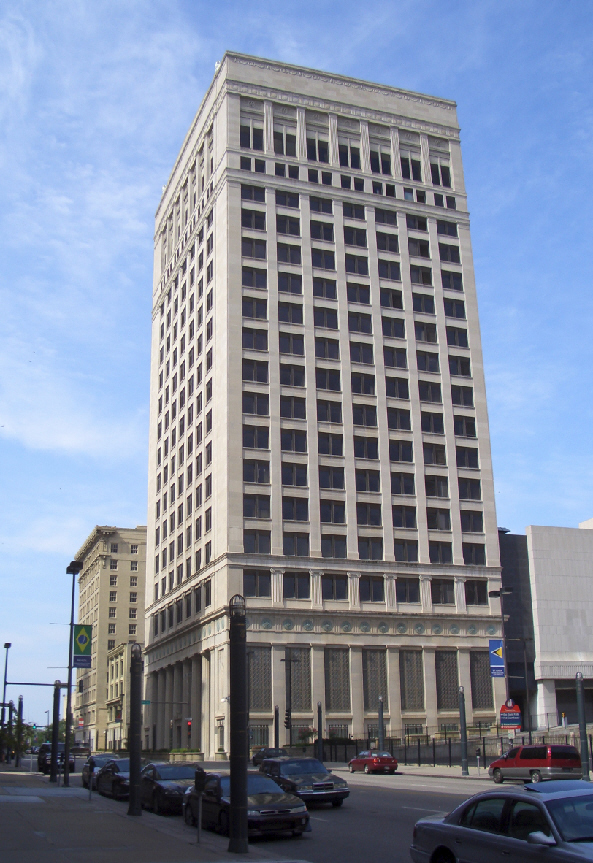
925 Grand, designed by Graham, Anderson, Probst & White, 1921.

The bank first occupied the R.A. Long Building at 928 Grand in Downtown Kansas City, which opened on November 16, 1914. It then moved across the street once a new $4.3 million building was constructed at 925 Grand, which formally opened in November 1921. Shortly after it was established, the bank rented space to outside tenants. President Harry S. Truman had his office in Room 1107 of the building from when he left the Presidency in 1953 until the Truman Library was completed in 1957.

In 2002, the bank announced plans to build a new facility at 1 Memorial Drive 20 blocks south at 29th and Main on 15.6 acres (63,000 m^{2}) on a hilltop south of the Liberty Memorial. The historic 925 Grand Building was the oldest building of any Federal Reserve Bank operating at that time. It was sold to Townsend LLC in March 2005 and the Reserve leased back the structure until the new building opened in spring 2008. It was designed by Henry N. Cobb of Pei Cobb Freed & Partners.

== Economic policy symposium ==
Since 1978, the Kansas City Fed has held an annual economic policy symposium. From 1978–1981, it was held at different locations, and from 1982 it has been held in Jackson Hole, Wyoming. From 1978 to 1981 the symposia focused on agricultural economic issues. Since 1981 topics have been more broad and the symposia have gotten broader attention.

In 2003 and 2005, papers were presented at the symposium that were critical of the status quo, and predicted problems with the unseen risks of derivatives. These ideas in these papers were rejected at the time, but later were seen as having predicted the 2008 financial crisis.

=== Jackson Hole Consensus ===
The 2014 edition of the symposium was widely anticipated. Featuring a speech by European Central Bank president Mario Draghi, it was depicted as the point of emergence of a new consensus in the economics doctrine and institutions, stressing the importance of aggregate demand, countercyclical investments and fiscal policy in opposition to the so-called austerity policies of the Washington Consensus and Berlin View. This paved the way for quantitative easing to begin in 2015.

== The Money Museum ==
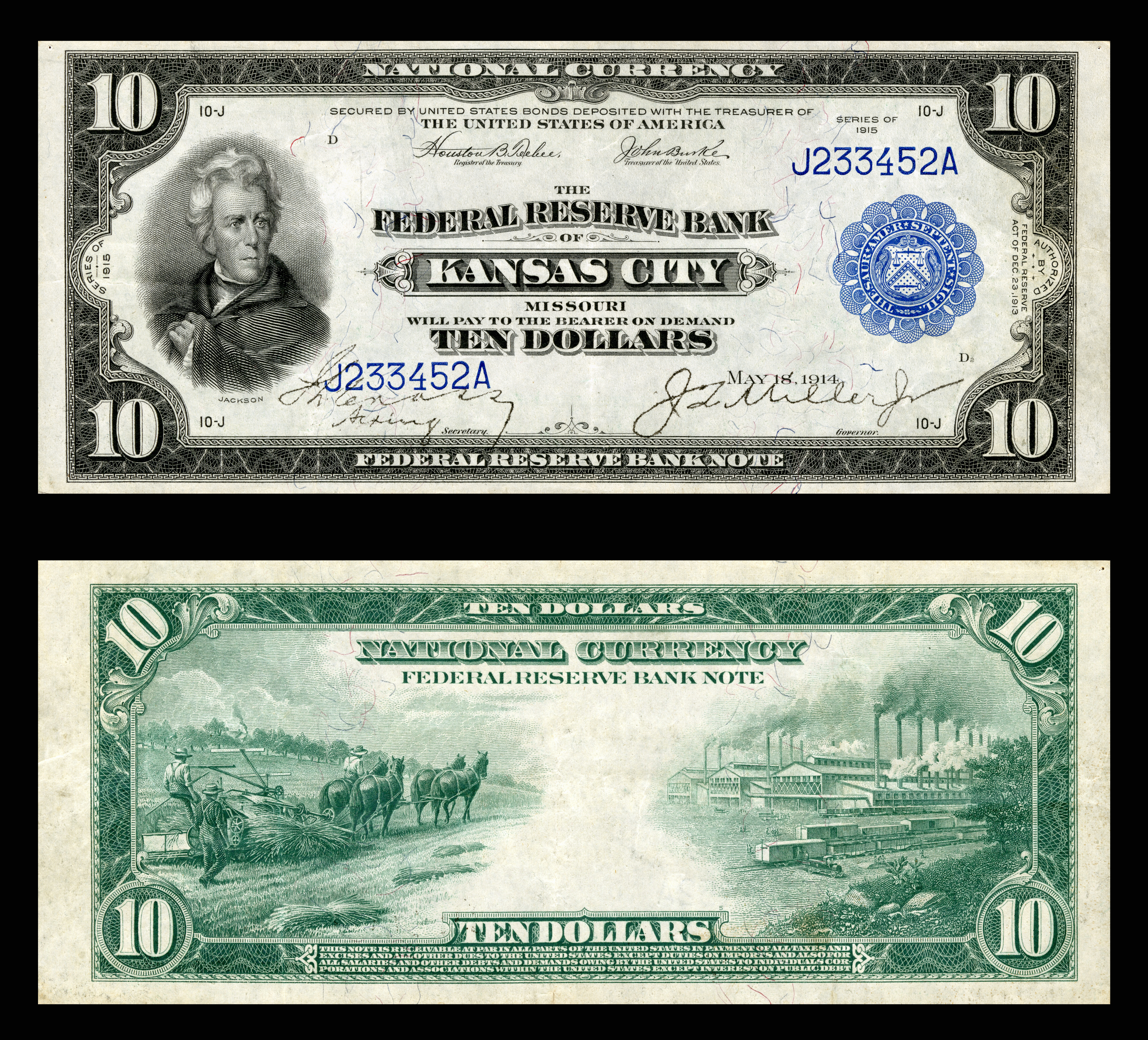
$10 1915 Kansas City District Federal Reserve Bank Note.

The Fed operates a museum at its new site, called The Money Museum. It offers visitors opportunities to learn about the functions of the Federal Reserve system and America's financial systems. Features of the museum include interactive exhibits, a visit to the automated, multi-story cash vault where millions of dollars are secured — one of the largest in the region, viewing of the Harry S. Truman Coin Collection, and an opportunity to lift a real gold bar. The museum is open weekdays for self-guided tours and for one-hour guided tours, except holidays.

== Branches ==
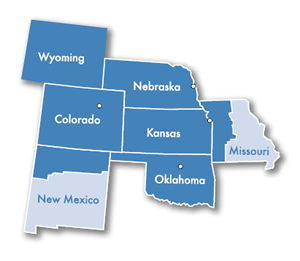
Map of the Tenth District

- Federal Reserve Bank of Kansas City Denver Branch
- Federal Reserve Bank of Kansas City Oklahoma City Branch
- Federal Reserve Bank of Kansas City Omaha Branch

== Leaders of the bank ==
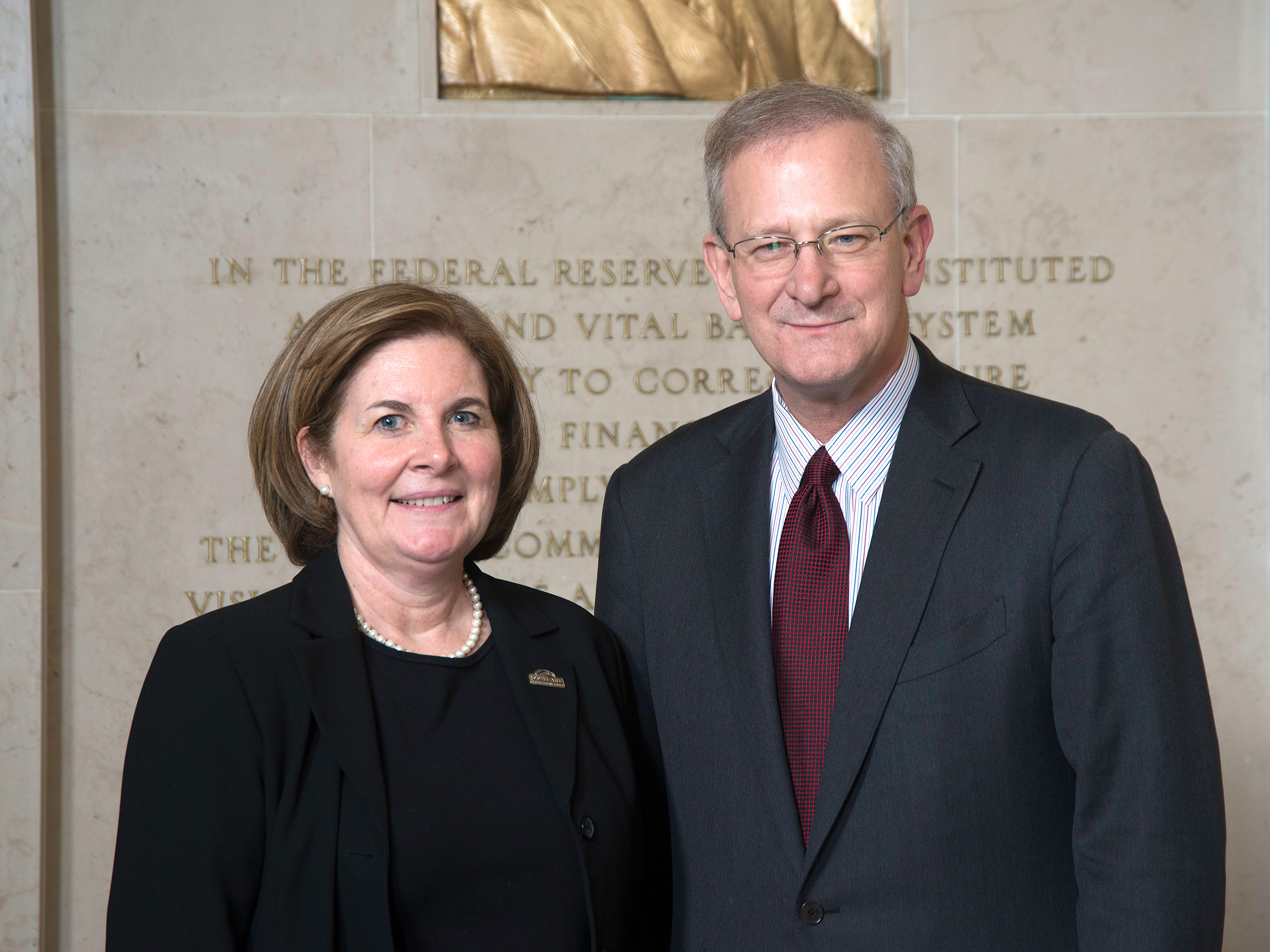
Esther George and Thomas Hoenig

A list of leaders of the Kansas City Federal Reserve are listed below.

- Charles Manville Sawyer, Governor (1914–1916)
- Jo Zach Miller Jr., Governor (1916–1922)
- Willis Joshua Bailey, Governor (1922–1932)
- George Henry Hamilton, Governor/President (1932–1941)
- Harold Gavin Leedy, President (1941–1961)
- George H. Clay, President (1961–1976)
- J. Roger Guffey, President (1976–1991)
- Thomas M. Hoenig, President (1991–2011)
- Esther George, President (2011–2023)
- Jeffrey Schmid, President (2023–present)

== Chairs ==
Following are chairs of the board of directors of the Kansas City Federal Reserve since 1992.

Year	Chair	Company	Residence
2023–present	Patrick A. Dujakovich	Greater Kansas City AFL-CIO	Kansas City, Missouri
2017–2022	Rose M. Washington	Tulsa Economic Development Corporation	Tulsa, Oklahoma
2015–2016	Steve Maestas	Maestas Development Group	Albuquerque, New Mexico
2013–2014	Barbara Mowry	GoreCreek Advisors	Greenwood Village, Colorado
2011–2012	Paul DeBruce	DeBruce Grain	Kansas City, Missouri
2008–2010	Lu M. Córdova	Corlund Industries	Boulder, Colorado
2005–2007	Robert A. Funk	Express Personnel Services	Oklahoma City, Oklahoma
2003–2004	Richard H. Bard	International Surface Preparation Corporation	Golden, Colorado
2001–2002	Terrence P. Dunn	J.E. Dunn Construction	Kansas City, Missouri
1998–2000	Jo Marie Dancik	Ernst & Young	Denver, Colorado
1996–1997	A. Drue Jennings	Kansas City Power & Light Company	Kansas City, Missouri
1995–1996	Herman Cain	Godfather's Pizza	Omaha, Nebraska
1992–1994	Burton A. Dole Jr.	Puritan-Bennett Corporation	Overland Park, Kansas

== Board of directors ==
The following people are on the board of directors as of 2023:

Class	Name	Company	Residence	Term Expires Dec 31	Notes
A	Patricia J. Minard	Emprise Bank	Wichita, Kansas	2023	
A	Kyle Heckman	Flatirons Bank	Boulder, Colorado	2024	
A	Alex Williams	Halstead Bank	Halstead, Kansas	2025	
B	Ruben Alonso III	AltCap	Kansas City, Missouri	2023	
B	Ramin Cherafat	McCownGordon Construction	Kansas City, Missouri	2024	
B	Paul Maass	Scoular	Omaha, Nebraska	2025	
C	María Griego-Raby	Contract Associates	Albuquerque, New Mexico	2023	Deputy Chair
C	Jandel Allen-Davis	Craig Hospital	Englewood, Colorado	2024	
C	Patrick A. Dujakovich	Greater Kansas City AFL-CIO	Kansas City, Missouri	2025	Chair

According to the Kansas City's website the directors blended as follows:

Class A - Three Class A directors represent commercial banks that are members of the Federal Reserve System. These directors are bankers who are nominated and elected by member banks within the Tenth Federal Reserve District, which includes western Missouri, Nebraska, Kansas, Oklahoma, Wyoming, Colorado and northern New Mexico. Under the Class A category, a director will be elected by a specific group of member banks classified as either 1, 2 or 3. This classification is based on the total amount of capital and surplus for each commercial bank, with Group 1 banks being the largest. Each group within the class elects one director.

Class B - Three Class B directors represent the public. Class B directors may not be an officer, director or employee of a bank or bank holding company. These directors are also elected by member banks under the same categories as Class A directors.

Class C - Three Class C directors also represent the public, but are appointed by the Board of Governors of the Federal Reserve System. This adds another layer to the blending of public and private control over the nation's central bank. The Board of Governors also selects both the chairman and deputy chairman of each regional Federal Reserve Bank's board of directors from among the Class C directors. These directors are highly insulated from banking relationships. They may not be an officer, director or employee of a bank or bank holding company. Additionally, these directors may not own stock in a bank or a bank holding company.

== Popular culture ==
The heist in the 2008 movie Mad Money takes place at a fictitious version of the bank.

== See also ==
- Federal Reserve Act
- Federal Reserve System
- Federal Reserve Bank
- Federal Reserve Districts
- Federal Reserve Branches
- Federal Reserve Bank of Kansas City Denver Branch
- Federal Reserve Bank of Kansas City Oklahoma City Branch
- Federal Reserve Bank of Kansas City Omaha Branch
- Structure of the Federal Reserve System
