= Harold Gavin Leedy =

American banker

Harold Leedy

President of the Federal Reserve Bank of Kansas City
- In office August 28, 1941 – March 1, 1961
- Preceded by: George Hamilton
- Succeeded by: George H. Clay

Personal details
- Born: Harold Gavin Leedy; February 6, 1892 Benton, Missouri, U.S.
- Died: July 28, 1989 (aged 97) Kansas City, Missouri
- Education: William Jewell College (BA); University of Missouri, Kansas City (LLB)

Harold Gavin Leedy (December 6, 1892 – July 28, 1989) was president of the Federal Reserve Bank of Kansas City from 1941 to 1961.

Leedy was born in Benton, Missouri, U.S. His family moved to Cameron, Missouri when he was a child. He graduated from William Jewell College. He interrupted his studies at what was then called the Kansas City School of Law (now University of Missouri-Kansas City School of Law) to join the Army during World War I. He was injured in France. He returned to Kansas City to complete his law studies. He subsequently taught classes there. Among his pupils was Harry S. Truman.

He joined the Kansas City Federal Reserve in 1938 as general counsel. He became president of that organization in 1941.

Other offices
Preceded by George Hamilton	President of the Federal Reserve Bank of Kansas City; 1941–1961	Succeeded by George H. Clay
