= Jeffrey Schmid =

Federal Reserve Bank of Kansas City President

Jeff Schmid
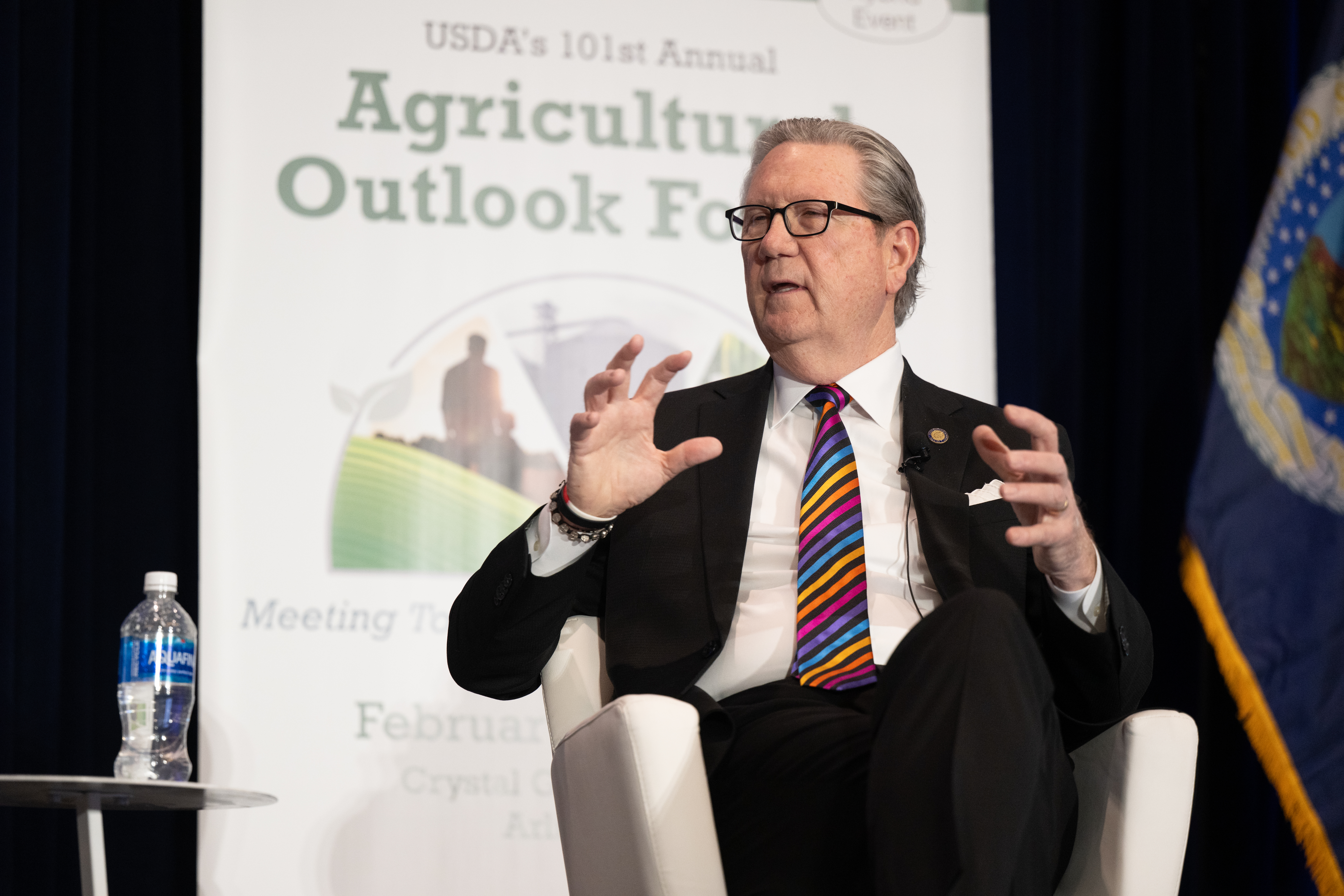

President of the Federal Reserve Bank of Kansas City
- Incumbent
- Assumed office August 21, 2023
- Preceded by: Kelly Dubbert (acting)

Personal details
- Born: 1958 or 1959 (age 67–68)
- Education: University of Nebraska–Lincoln (BS); Southern Methodist University (attended)

Jeffrey R. Schmid (born 1958 or 1959) is the president of the Federal Reserve Bank of Kansas City. He assumed office on 21 August 2023, succeeding Esther L. George.

Schmid began his career at the Federal Deposit Insurance Corporation in 1981 as a field examiner and later worked as a regional review examiner. He was president of American National Bank in Omaha from 1989 to 2007, chairman and chief executive officer of Mutual of Omaha Bank from 2007 to 2019, and chief executive officer of Susser Bank from 2020 to 2021. From 2021 until his appointment to the Kansas City Fed, he was president and chief executive officer of the Southwestern Graduate School of Banking Foundation at Southern Methodist University.

Other offices
Preceded by Kelly Dubbert; Acting	President of the Federal Reserve Bank of Kansas City; 2023–present	Incumbent
