= Charles H. Sawyer (neuroendocrinologist) =

American neuroendocrinologist

- Born: January 24, 1915
- Died: June 20, 2006 (aged 91)
- Education: Middlebury College; Yale University (PhD, zoology)
- Scientific career
- Fields: neuroendocrinology
- Workplaces: UCLA
- Notable students: Barry Komisaruk

Charles H. “Tom” Sawyer (January 24, 1915 Ludlow, Vermont - June 20, 2006 Irvine, California) was an American neuroendocrinologist and Distinguished Emeritus Professor of Neurobiology at the University of California, Los Angeles. Sawyer was considered a pioneer in the field of neuroendocrinology.

At the age of 91, he died of Alzheimer’s.

== Career ==
Sawyer’s work at UCLA was crucial in the treatment of infertility and birth control pills.

His research showed that ovulation was controlled by the hypothalamus which was controlled by a circadian clock. He also showed norepinephrine role in ovulation as well as oestradiol in stimulating the nervous system.
