= Charles Henry Sawyer (photographer) =

American painter

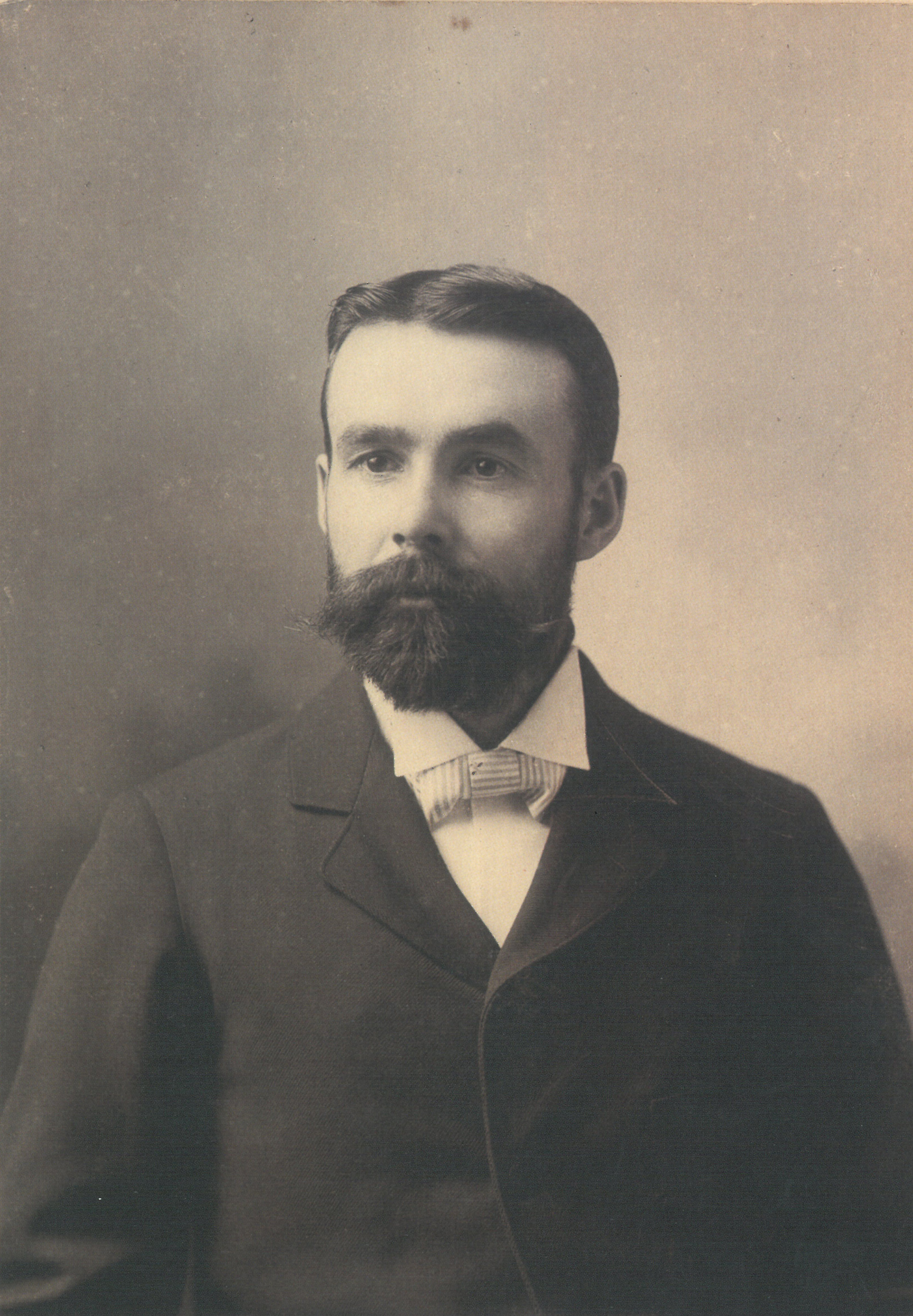
- Born: March 24, 1868; Norridgewock, Maine
- Died: June 14, 1954 (aged 86); Concord, New Hampshire
- Known for: Hand-painted photographs of the United States and Canada, landscapes, seascapes and rare "mood-art" images
- Movement: American Pictorial

Charles Henry Sawyer (1868-1954) was a painter and photographer in the United States.

== Early life ==
Charles H. Sawyer was born on March 24, 1868, probably in Norridgewock, Maine, the third son of Henry K. Sawyer, who ran a hotel and livery stable. He and his brothers Russell and William were educated locally and then attended the Eaton School. Here Charles studied art and painting; and it was here he met his future wife, Mary Anderson.

== Artist and photographer ==
In the 1890s Sawyer began his career as a portrait artist, a painter, and then as a photographer in Providence, Rhode Island. He also worked as a pencil artist for the New-York Tribune and worked with the well-known photo painter Wallace Nutting. Here, Sawyer learned the painting and coloring techniques that would move his black and white photographic art to another level. He also created watercolor, pastel, and crayon portraits on commission. Ultimately, however, his fortune and reputation were built on his dramatic American and Canadian landscapes.

After a second stay in Providence, he returned to Norridgewock to concentrate on his scenic, mostly local, photographs. Soon after a fire in 1904, Charles, his wife Mary and son Harold settled in Farmington, Maine, next to Norridgewock, to start a new life. Coincidentally, it was the same year that Wallace Nutting opened his first studio in New York City. Charles Sawyer maintained his studio on Main Street in Farmington from 1904 until 1918.

== Work ==
=== Hand-painted photographs ===
Using watercolor, gouache and oil paints, Sawyer began transforming his black and white photographs into images of glowing landscapes, in many ways reminiscent of the Hudson River School of oil painters. Commercial color film was still 30 years away, and 30 years of the golden age of hand-painted photography lay ahead.

Sawyer added color to his black and white photographs by hand-painting and hand-coloring each photograph, one at a time. These early colorings were primarily grey/green, but as his skill and expertise continued, myriad colors and shades were added.

In hand-coloring, the entire photographic image can be seen through a translucent color film, with no image details obscured by the color medium. But in hand-painting, opaque colors are applied to black and white photographs, to cover or alter portions of the photographic image. The same paint, sometimes in a deeper color, was also used to paint the color into the photograph.

=== Photography technique and style ===
Sawyer's first photographs were originally printed from glass negatives on a platinum paper ("platinotypes"). After World War I, platinotypes were replaced by Satista paper, which came from England, and later from Boston. This paper contained only a trace of platinum, but a larger amount of silver. Satista was mainly used for watercolors; bromide papers were primarily used to support oils. These papers were dipped in water and then sponge-dried. Sawyer's earliest prints were painted with watercolor. Because of this, prints surviving from this period are usually more muted.

Most finished photographs sold by Charles Sawyer were hand-painted. Few photographs were sold as black and white, and Sawyer's sepia offerings were even less common. For this reason, today, Sawyer's sepia images are hard to find.

Unlike Wallace Nutting, Charles Sawyer rarely staged scenes. If an image contained people, cattle, sheep, etc., that is what was there and happening at the time. "Among the New England Hills", photographed and painted in 1904 in Farmington, Maine, is just such a scene. This pencil-signed photograph contains two hay wagons pulled by cattle, with a young boy atop a hay load. A man stands beside one loaded wagon, and a woman in a long dress is handing a bearded old man a cup. Mountains are the backdrop for the scene. In life, this was the Voter family on Voter Hill. Other shots of the scene, with slight variations, were also captured on glass film. Other titles focusing on the wagon scene include "Hay in the Orchard", "Helping Grandpa", and "The Last Load".

Because it was uncommon for Charles Sawyer to stage scenes, Sawyer images with people or animals are rare. Interiors are also uncommon. His preference for capturing and presenting landscapes was validated by sales in his lifetime; and landscapes have also been his most enduring work.

== New Hampshire studio ==
In order to be closer to the scenic areas of New Hampshire's White Mountains, the initial focus of Charles' work, the Sawyers left Farmington in the early 1920s and moved to Concord, New Hampshire – a move that would last a lifetime.

At Charles Sawyer's studio at 55 Pleasant Street in Concord, Charles' business expanded and prospered. By 1922, Sawyer advertisements in the Concord Directory were common. Photographic painters and colorists were hired; some worked in the studio and some took photographs home to complete.

In small notebooks, Sawyer kept exact notes on his shooting excursions between 1922 and 1930. He noted the intensity of the sun ("hazy sun", "very little sun"), the spot from which he shot ("Winnipesaukee from Rivers Farm, Long Island") and the technicalities of shutter speed, frame numbers, film type, etc. He also noted color specifics, such as "a little mauve near the falls on the right. Dark wet brown right near the falls. Foreground gray and orange – yellow gravel,…" Occasionally, he noted information about historical landmarks or the fact that he had had a good time, or copied down the name of someone to whom a free painted photograph should be sent.

Sawyer operated his studio longer than Wallace Nutting, David Davidson or Fred Thompson, contemporaries in the genre.

== Final years and death ==
The business survived two world wars, a studio fire in 1943, a recession, and a stagnant economy. For this reason, no matter where he was and no matter what he was doing, the personal letters of Charles Sawyer all mention some aspect of painting or the business. It was his life.

Charles Sawyer's health was failing in the spring of 1954. He died on Wednesday, June 14, 1954. Heart disease is believed to be the cause. Sawyer's final resting spot is in Norridgewock, Maine. His tombstone reads, "He walked with beauty."

== Gallery ==
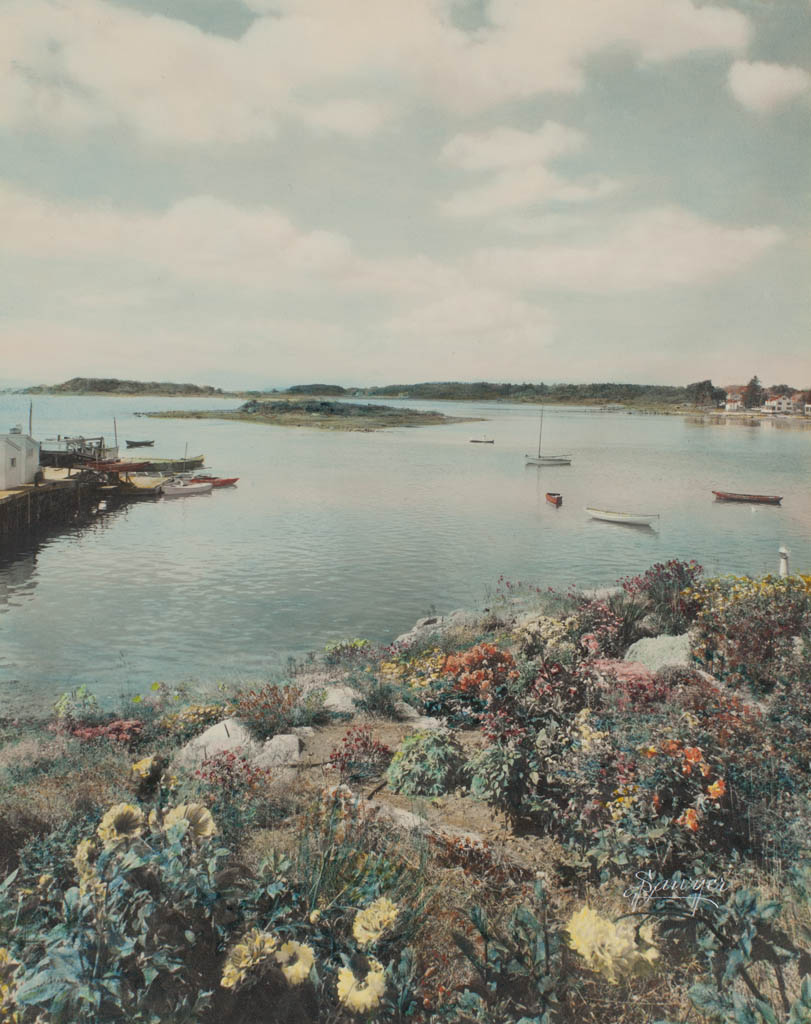
Cape Porpoise

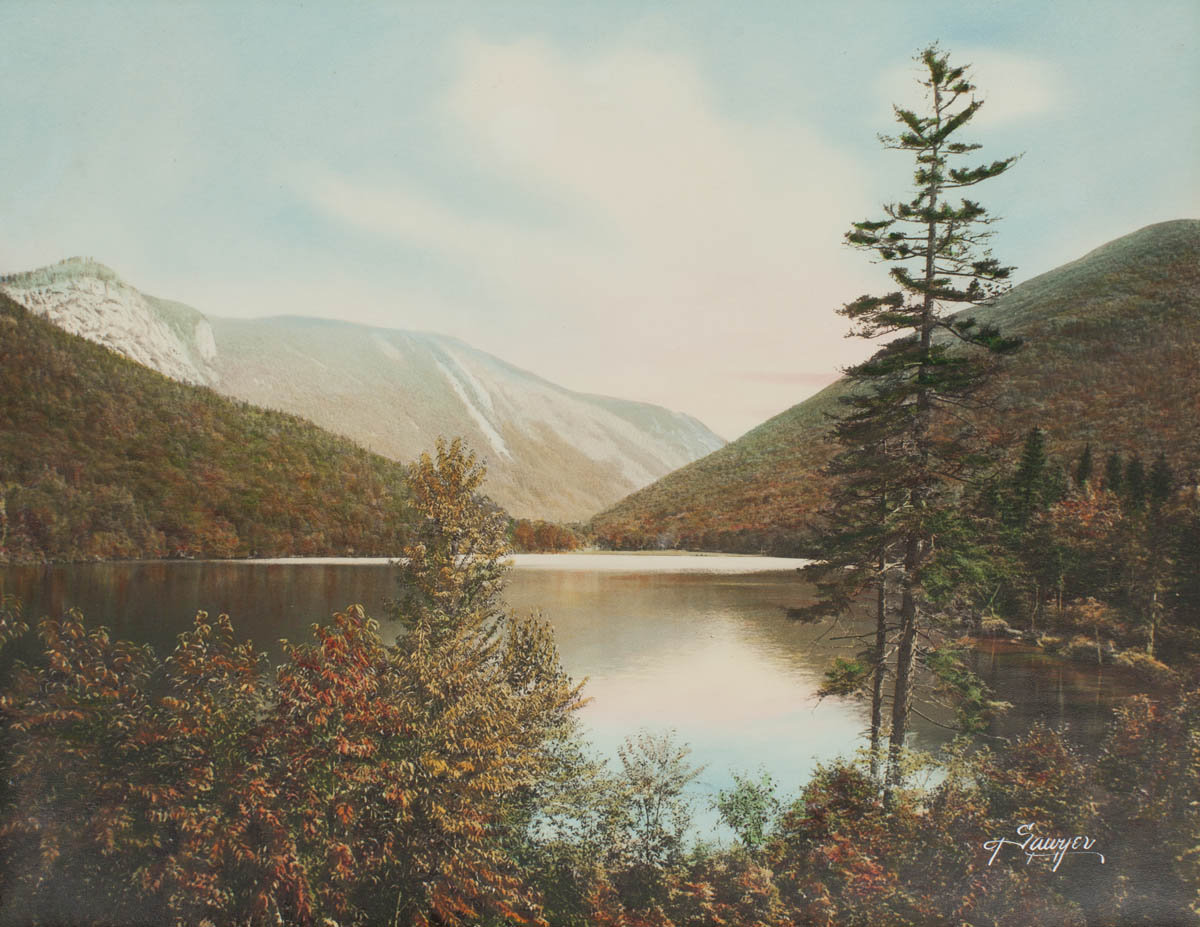
Echo Lake

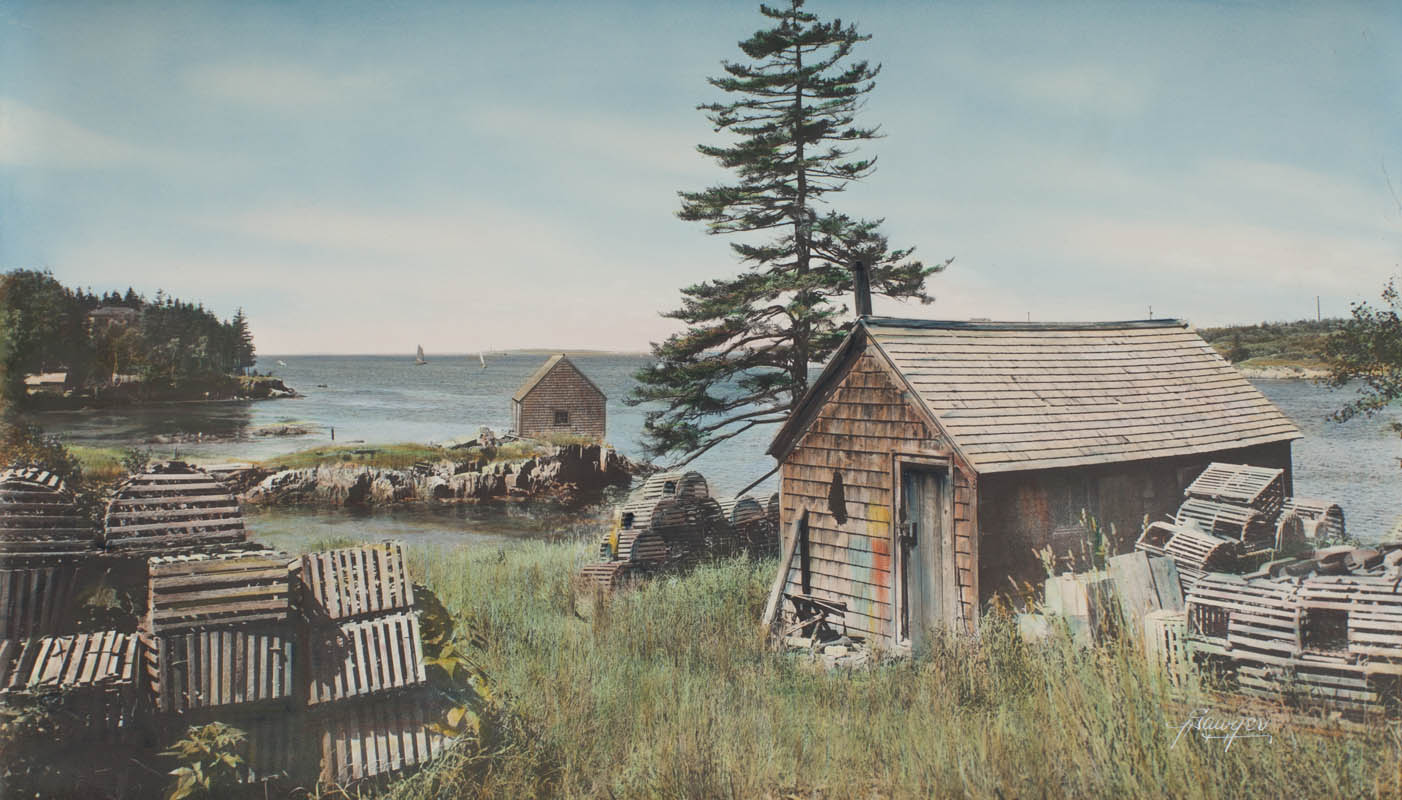
Fish Houses

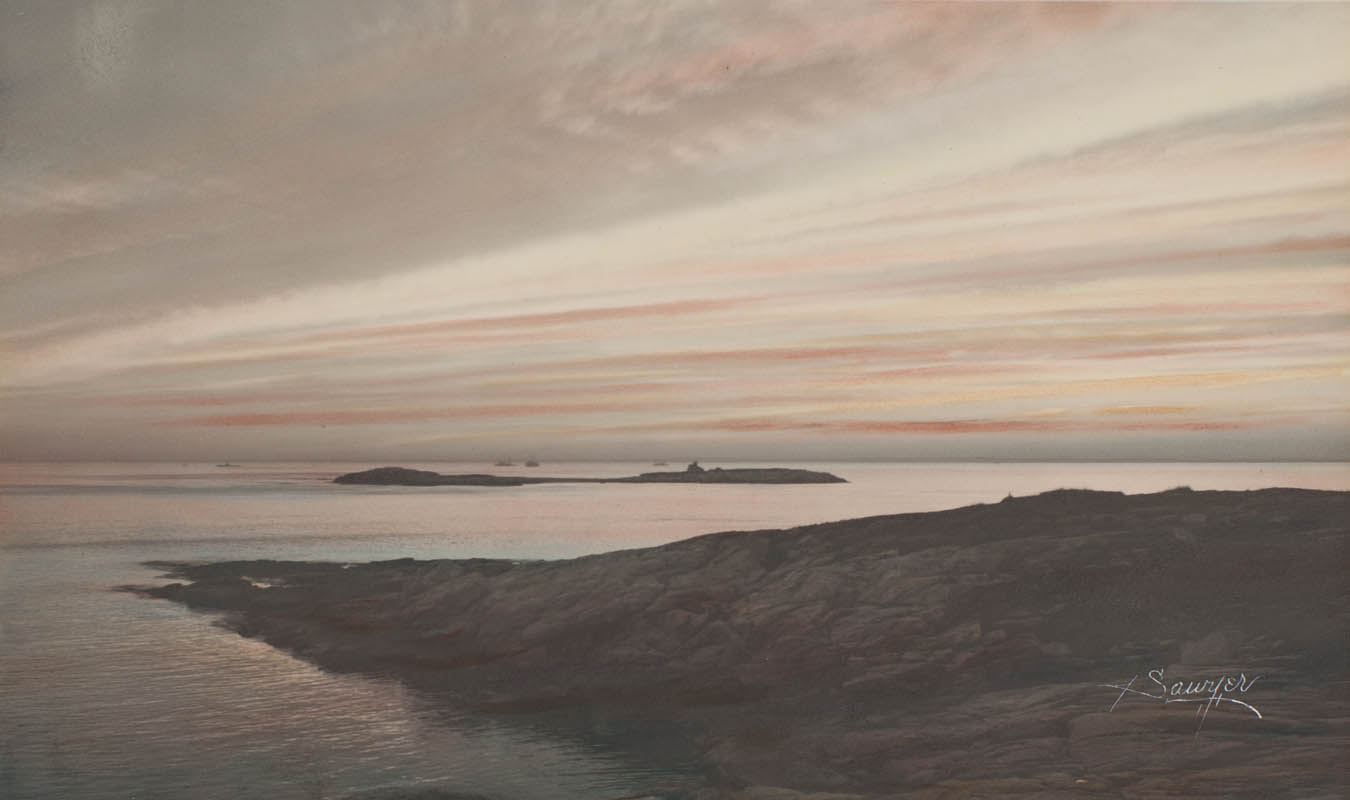
Goodbye Sweet Day

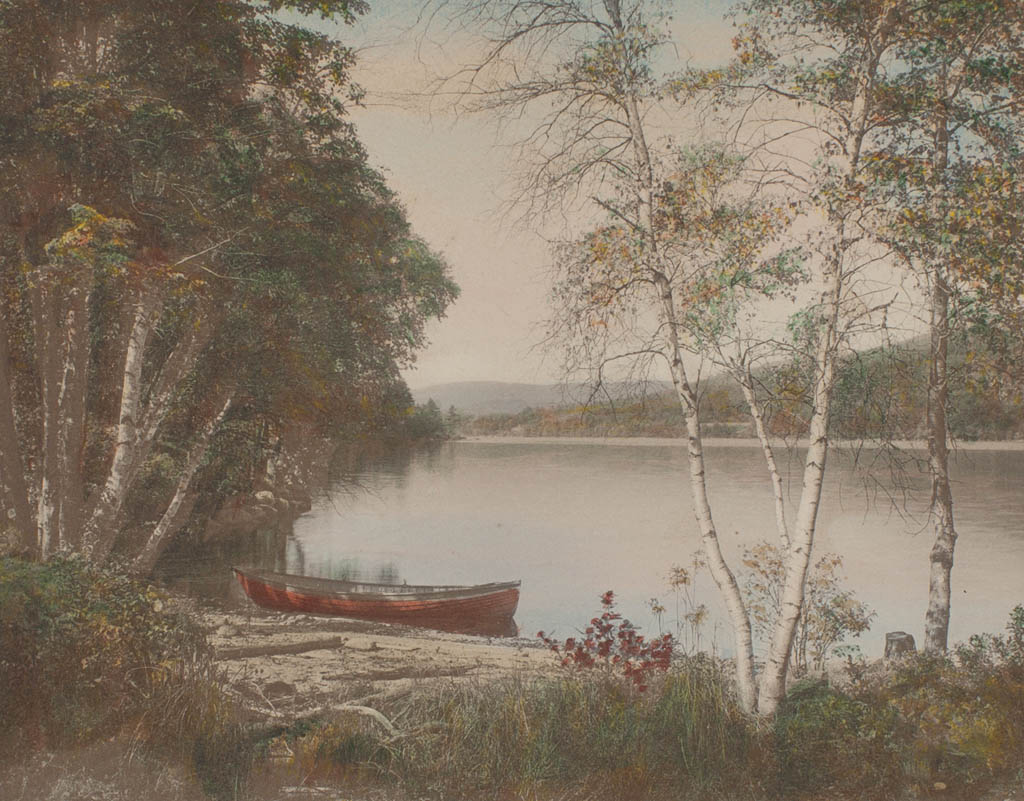
Morning Over Asquam Lake

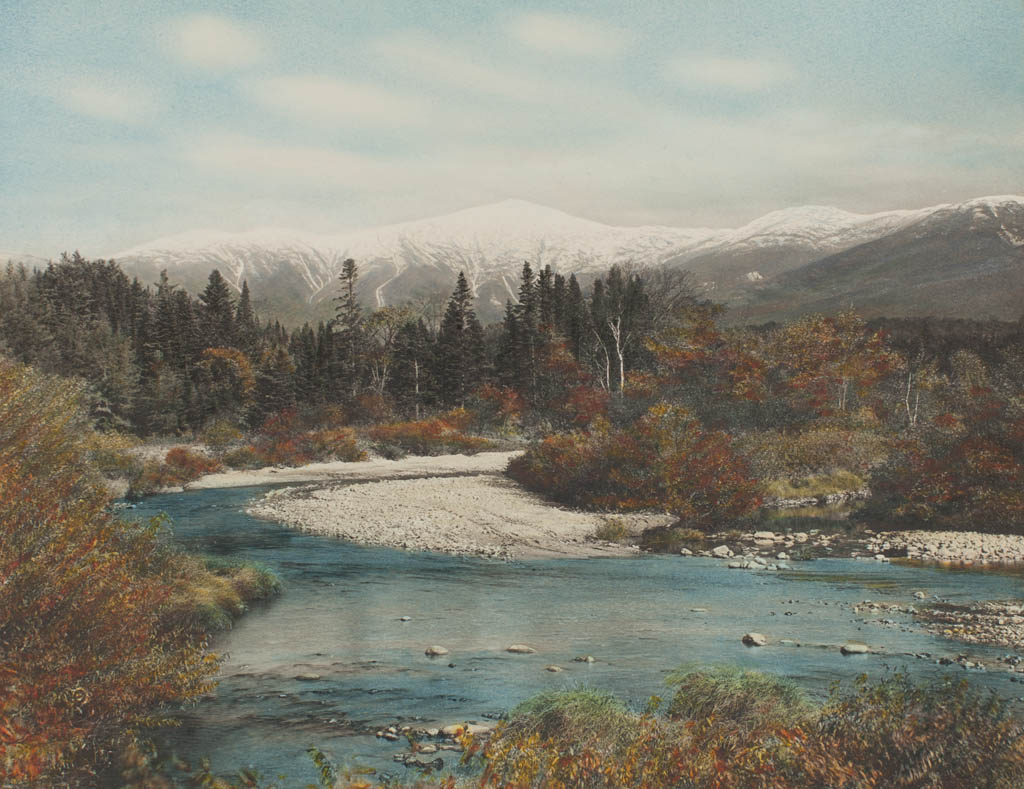
Mt. Washington

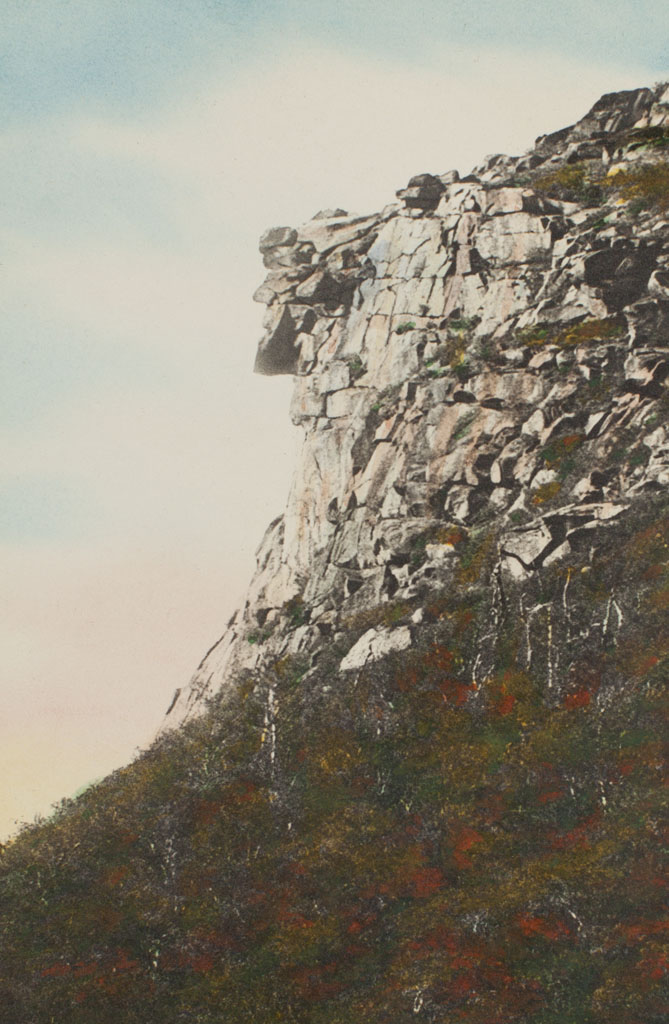
Old Man of the Mountains

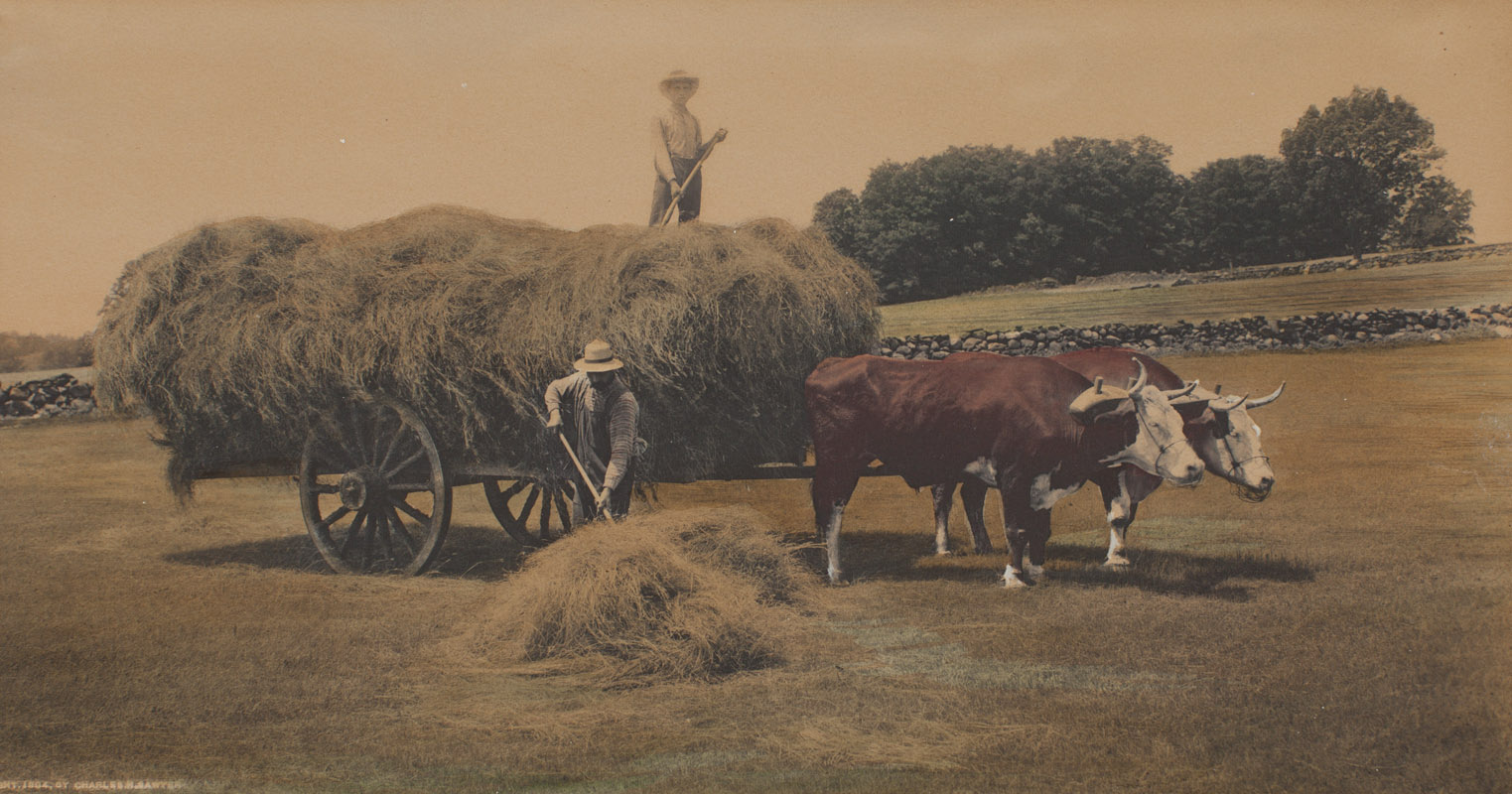
The Last Load

== See also ==
- Wallace Nutting
