= Structure of the Federal Reserve System =

The structure of the Federal Reserve System is unique among central banks in the world, with both public and private aspects. It is described as "independent within the government" rather than "independent of government".

The Federal Reserve does not require public funding; instead, it remits its profits to the U.S. Federal government. It derives its authority and purpose from the Federal Reserve Act, which was passed by Congress in 1913 and is subject to Congressional modification or repeal.

== Composition ==
The Federal Reserve System is composed of five parts:

1. The presidentially appointed Board of Governors (or Federal Reserve Board), an independent federal government agency located in Washington, D.C.
2. The Federal Open Market Committee (FOMC), composed of the seven members of the Federal Reserve Board and five of the twelve Federal Reserve Bank presidents, which oversees open market operations, the principal tool of U.S. monetary policy.
3. Twelve regional Federal Reserve Banks located in major cities throughout the nation, which divide the nation into twelve Federal Reserve districts. The Federal Reserve Banks act as fiscal agents for the U.S. Treasury, and each has its own nine-member board of directors.
4. Numerous other private U.S. member banks, which own required amounts of non-transferable stock in their regional Federal Reserve Banks.
5. Various advisory councils.

According to the board of governors of the Federal Reserve, "It is not 'owned' by anyone and is 'not a private, profit-making institution'. Instead, it is an independent entity within the government, having both public purposes and private aspects." The U.S. Government does not own shares in the Federal Reserve System or its component banks, but does receive all of the system's annual profits after a statutory dividend of 6% on their capital investment is paid to member banks and a capital account surplus is maintained. The government also exercises some control over the Federal Reserve by appointing and setting the salaries of the system's highest-level employees.

The division of the responsibilities of a central bank into several separate and independent parts, some private and some public, results in a structure that is considered unique among central banks. It is also unusual in that an entity outside of the central bank – the U.S. Department of the Treasury – creates the currency used.

== Independent within government ==
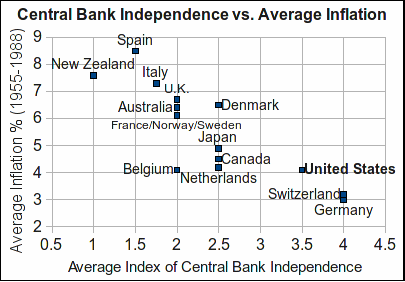
Central bank independence versus inflation. This often cited research published by Alesina and Summers (1993) is used to show why it is important for a nation's central bank (i.e.-monetary authority) to have a high level of independence. This chart shows a clear trend towards a lower inflation rate as the independence of the central bank increases. The generally agreed upon reason independence leads to lower inflation is that politicians have a tendency to create too much money if given the opportunity to do it. The Federal Reserve System in the United States is generally regarded as one of the more independent central banks

The Federal Reserve System is an independent government institution that has private aspects. The System is not a private organization and does not operate for the purpose of making a profit. The stocks of the regional federal reserve banks are owned by the banks operating within that region and which are part of the system. The System derives its authority and public purpose from the Federal Reserve Act passed by Congress in 1913. As an independent institution, the Federal Reserve System has the authority to act on its own without prior approval from Congress or the president. The members of its Board of Governors are appointed for long, staggered terms, limiting the influence of day-to-day political considerations. The Federal Reserve System's unique structure also provides internal checks and balances, ensuring that its decisions and operations are not dominated by any one part of the system. It also generates revenue independently without need for Congressional funding. Congressional oversight and statutes, which can alter the Fed's responsibilities and control, allow the government to keep the Federal Reserve System in check. Since the System was designed to be independent while also remaining within the government of the United States, it is often said to be "independent within the government".

The twelve Federal Reserve banks provide the financial means to operate the Federal Reserve System. Each reserve bank is organized much like a private corporation so that it can provide the necessary revenue to cover operational expenses and implement the demands of the board. A member bank is a privately owned bank that must buy an amount equal to 3% of its combined capital and surplus of stock in the Reserve Bank within its region of the Federal Reserve System. This stock "may not be sold, traded, or pledged as security for a loan" and all member banks receive a 6% annual dividend. No stock in any Federal Reserve Bank has ever been sold to the public, to foreigners, or to any non-bank U.S. firm. These member banks must maintain fractional reserves either as vault currency or on account at its Reserve Bank. As of October 2008, the Federal Reserve has paid interest to banks' holdings in Reserve Banks' accounts. The dividends paid by the Federal Reserve Banks to member banks are considered partial compensation for the lack of interest paid on the required reserves. All profit after expenses is returned to the U.S. Treasury or contributed to the surplus capital of the Federal Reserve Banks. Since shares in ownership of the Federal Reserve Banks are redeemable only at par, the nominal "owners" do not benefit from this surplus capital. In 2010, the Federal Reserve System contributed $79 billion to the U.S. Treasury.

== Outline ==
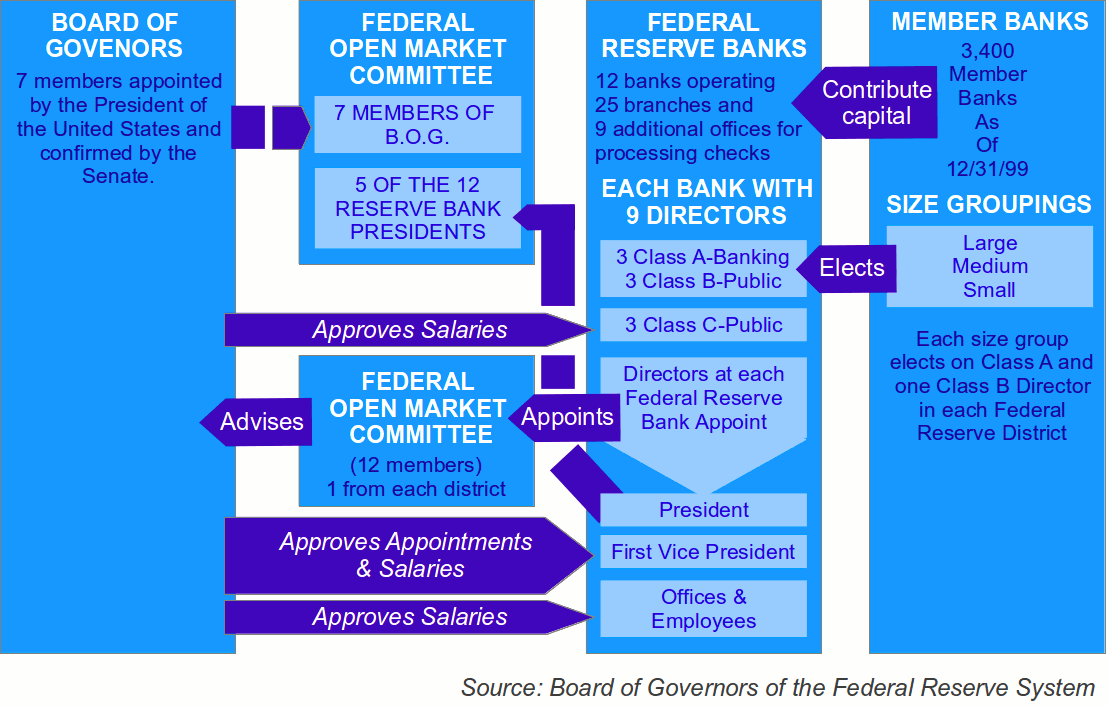
Organization of the Federal Reserve System

Whole
- The nation's central bank
- A regional structure with 12 districts
- Subject to general congressional authority and oversight
- Operates on its own earnings
Board of Governors
- Seven members serving staggered 14-year terms
- Appointed by the U.S. president and confirmed by the Senate
- Oversees System operations, makes regulatory decisions, and sets reserve requirements
Federal Open Market Committee
- The System's key monetary policymaking body
- Decisions seek to foster economic growth with price stability by influencing the flow of money and credit
- Composed of the seven members of the Board of Governors and five Reserve Bank presidents, one of whom is the president of the Federal Reserve Bank of New York, the other presidents serve as voting members for one-year terms on a rotating basis.
Federal Reserve Banks
- 12 regional banks with 25 branches
- Each independently incorporated with a nine-member board of directors, with six of them elected by the member banks while the remaining three are designated by the Board of Governors.
- Set discount rate, subject to approval by Board of Governors.
- Monitor economy and financial institutions in their districts and provide financial services to the U.S. government and depository institutions.
Member banks
- Private banks
- Hold stock in their local Federal Reserve Bank
- Elect six of the nine members of Reserve Banks' boards of directors.
Advisory Committees
- Carry out varied responsibilities

== Board of Governors ==
Board of Governors seal

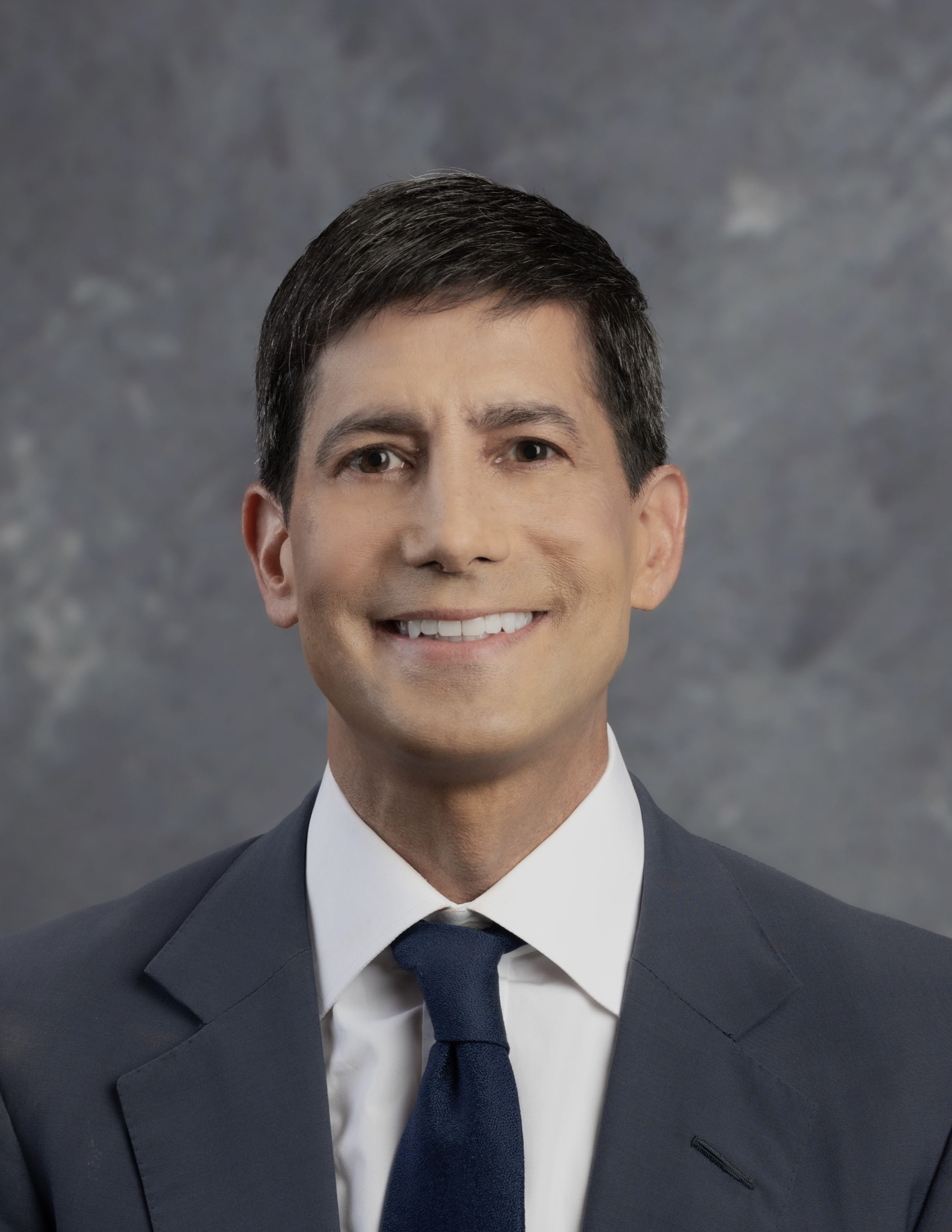
Kevin Warsh, current chairman of the Board of Governors of the Federal Reserve System.

The seven-member Board of Governors is the main governing body of the Federal Reserve System. It is charged with overseeing the 12 District Reserve Banks and with helping implement national monetary policy. Governors are appointed by the president of the United States and confirmed by the Senate for staggered, 14-year terms. By law, the appointments must yield a "fair representation of the financial, agricultural, industrial, and commercial interests and geographical divisions of the country", and as stipulated in the Banking Act of 1935, the chairman and vice chairman of the board are two of seven members of the Board of Governors who are appointed by the president from among the sitting governors. As an independent federal government agency, the Board of Governors does not receive funding from Congress, and the terms of the seven members of the Board span multiple presidential and congressional terms. Members of the Board of Governors function mostly independently. The Board is required to make an annual report of operations to the Speaker of the U.S. House of Representatives. It also supervises and regulates the operations of the Federal Reserve Banks, and the U.S. banking system in general.

Membership is by statute limited in term, and a member that has served for a full 14-year term is not eligible for reappointment. There are numerous occasions where an individual was appointed to serve the remainder of another member's uncompleted term, and has been reappointed to serve a full 14-year term. Since "upon the expiration of their terms of office, members of the Board shall continue to serve until their successors are appointed and have qualified", it is possible for a member to serve for significantly longer than a full term of 14 years. The law provides for the removal of a member of the board by the president "for cause".

For a list of the current members of the board of governors, see Federal Reserve Board of Governors.

== Federal Open Market Committee ==
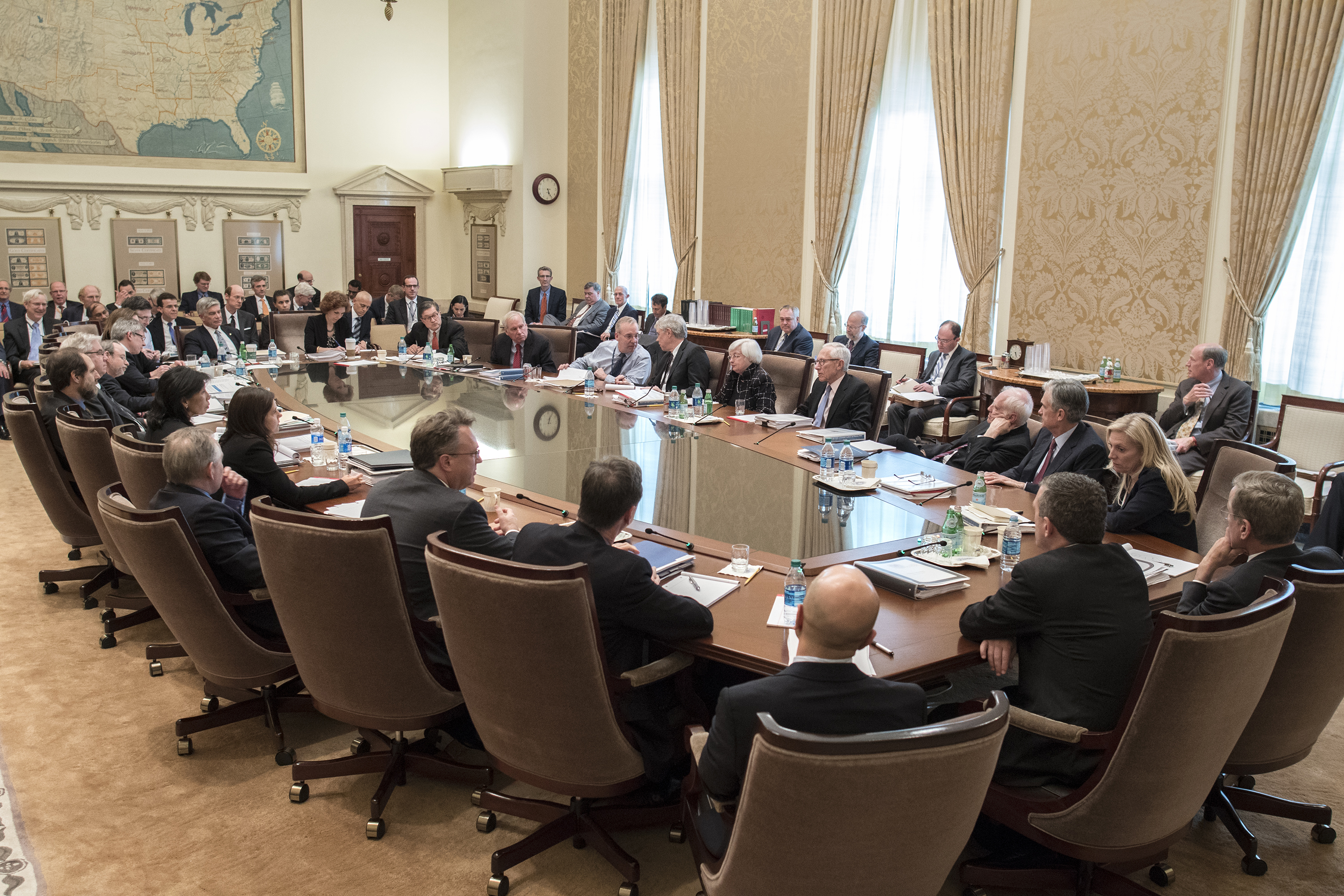
A 2016 meeting of the Federal Open Market Committee at the Eccles Building, Washington, D.C.

The Federal Open Market Committee (FOMC) created under 12 U.S.C. § 263 comprises the seven members of the board of governors and five representatives selected from the regional Federal Reserve Banks. The FOMC is charged under law with overseeing open market operations, the principal tool of national monetary policy. These operations affect the amount of Federal Reserve balances available to depository institutions, thereby influencing overall monetary and credit conditions. The FOMC also directs operations undertaken by the Federal Reserve in foreign exchange markets. The representative from the Second District, New York, is a permanent member, while the rest of the banks rotate at two- and three-year intervals. All the presidents participate in FOMC discussions, contributing to the committee's assessment of the economy and of policy options, but only the five presidents who are committee members vote on policy decisions. The FOMC, under law, determines its own internal organization and by tradition elects the Chairman of the Board of Governors as its chairman and the president of the Federal Reserve Bank of New York as its vice chairman. Formal meetings typically are held eight times each year in Washington, D.C. Telephone consultations and other meetings are held when needed.

== Federal Reserve Banks ==
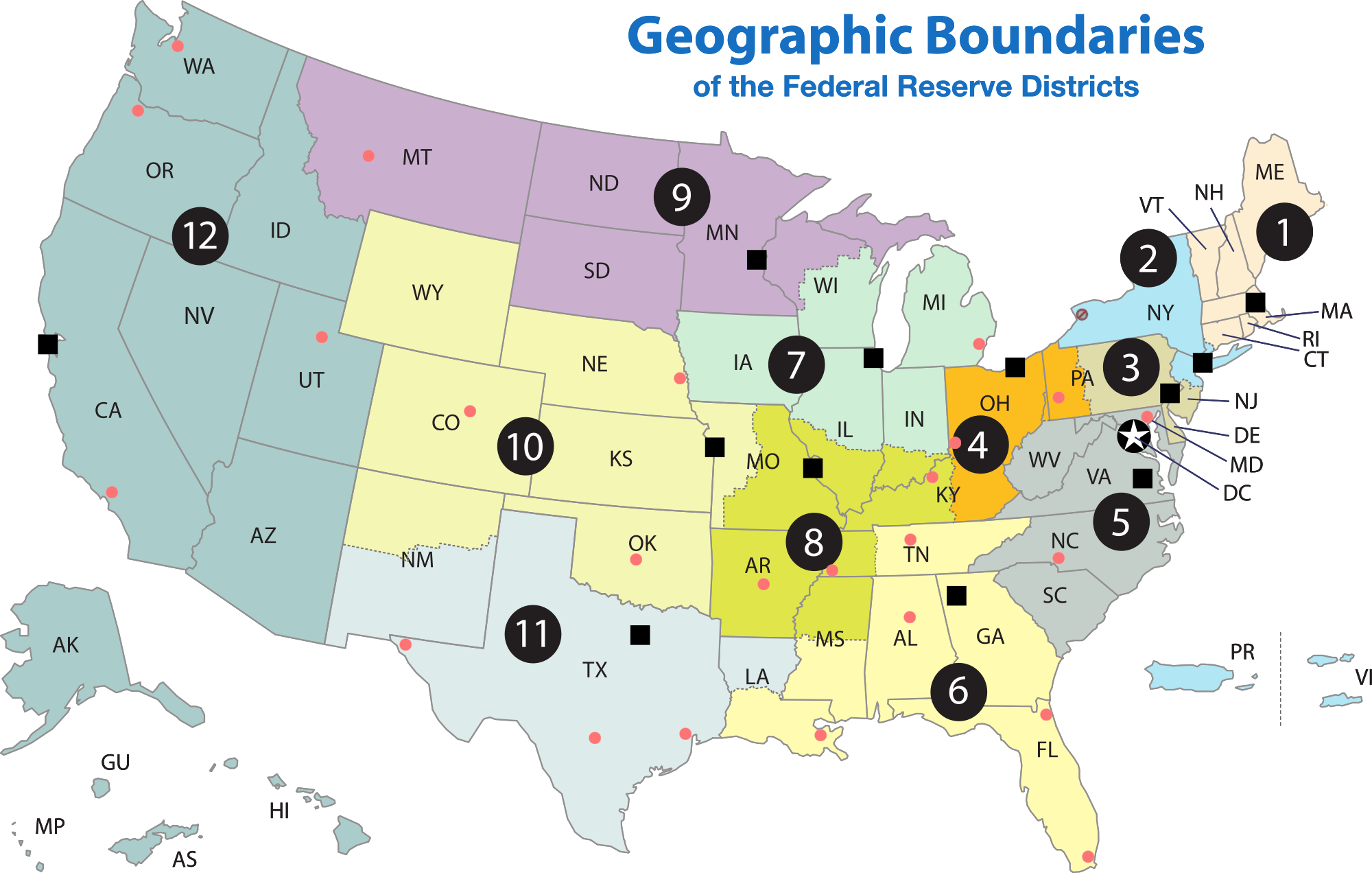
Map of the twelve Federal Reserve Districts, with the twelve Federal Reserve Banks marked as black squares, and all Branches within each district (24 total) marked as red circles. The Washington DC Headquarters is marked with a star. (Also, a 25th branch in Buffalo, NY had been closed in 2008.)

There are 12 regional Federal Reserve Banks, not to be confused with the "member banks", with 25 branches, which serve as the operating arms of the system. Each Federal Reserve Bank is subject to oversight by the Board of Governors. Each Federal Reserve Bank has a board of directors, whose members work closely with their Reserve Bank president to provide grassroots economic information and input on management and monetary policy decisions. These boards are drawn from the general public and the banking community and oversee the activities of the organization. They also appoint the presidents of the Reserve Banks, subject to the approval of the Board of Governors. Reserve Bank boards consist of nine members: six serving as representatives of nonbanking enterprises and the public (nonbankers) and three as representatives of banking. Each Federal Reserve branch office has its own board of directors, composed of three to seven members, that provides vital information concerning the regional economy.

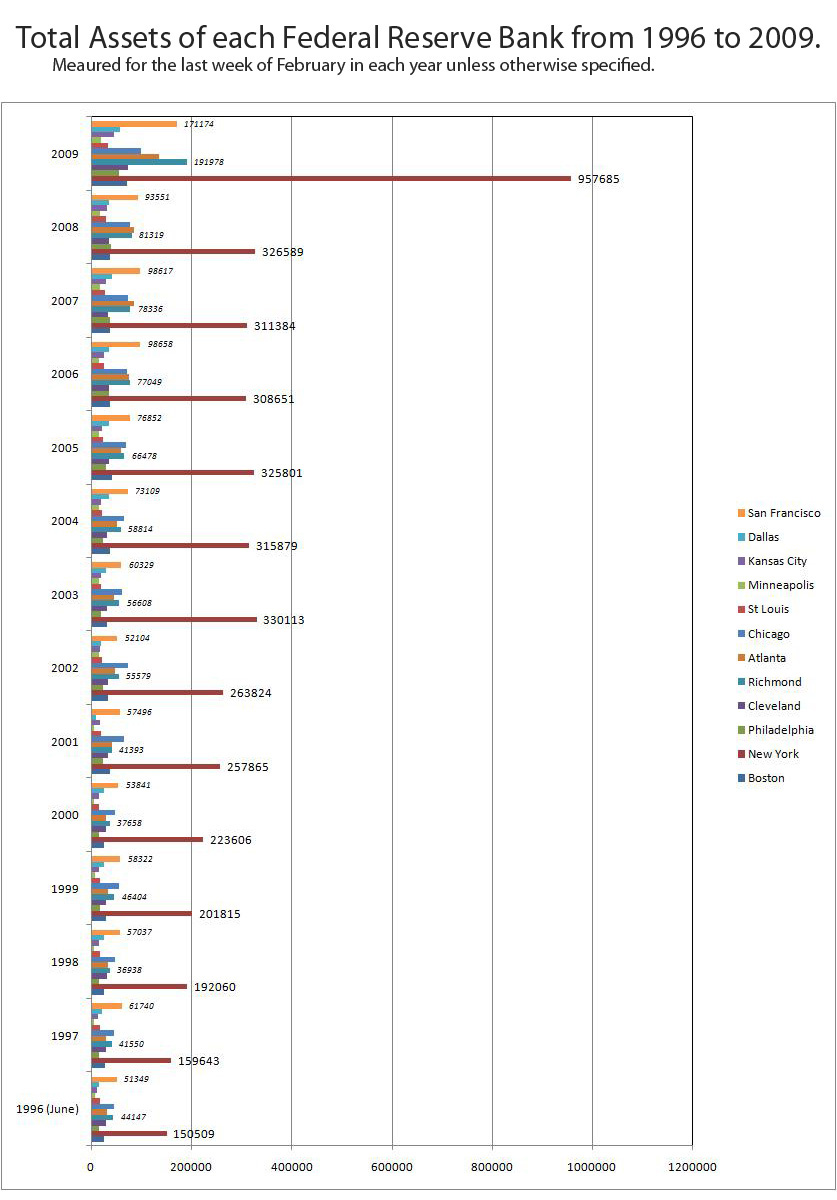
Total assets of each Federal Reserve Bank from 1996 to 2009 (Millions of Dollars)

The Reserve Banks opened for business on November 16, 1914. Federal Reserve Notes were created as part of the legislation to provide a supply of currency. The notes were to be issued to the Reserve Banks for subsequent transmittal to banking institutions. The various components of the Federal Reserve System have differing legal statuses.

=== Legal status ===
The Federal Reserve Banks have an intermediate legal status, with some features of private corporations and some features of public federal agencies. The United States has an interest in the Federal Reserve Banks as tax-exempt federally created instrumentalities whose profits belong to the federal government, but this interest is not proprietary. Each member bank (commercial banks in the Federal Reserve district) owns a nonnegotiable share of stock in its regional Federal Reserve Bank. However, holding Federal Reserve Bank stock is unlike owning stock in a publicly traded company. The charter of each Federal Reserve Bank is established by law and cannot be altered by the member banks. Federal Reserve Bank stock cannot be sold or traded, and member banks do not control the Federal Reserve Bank as a result of owning this stock. They do, however, elect six of the nine members of the Federal Reserve Banks' boards of directors. In Lewis v. United States, the United States Court of Appeals for the Ninth Circuit stated that: "The Reserve Banks are not federal instrumentalities for purposes of the FTCA [the Federal Tort Claims Act], but are independent, privately owned and locally controlled corporations." The opinion went on to say, however, that: "The Reserve Banks have properly been held to be federal instrumentalities for some purposes." Another relevant decision is Scott v. Federal Reserve Bank of Kansas City, in which the distinction is made between Federal Reserve Banks, which are federally created instrumentalities, and the Board of Governors, which is a federal agency.

As noted by many economic and legal scholars, the Federal Reserve System in the United States is not a single, independent entity. Rather, it is a large, convoluted net of many agencies and parties who frequently consult with outsiders to determine their actions.

=== Board of directors ===
The nine member board of directors of each district is made up of three classes, designated as classes A, B, and C. The directors serve a term of three years. The makeup of the boards of directors is outlined in U.S. Code, Title 12, Chapter 3, Subchapter 7:

==== Class A ====
- three members chosen by, and representative of, the stockholding banks.
- member banks are divided into 3 groups based on size—large, medium, and small banks. Each group elects one member of Class A.

==== Class B ====
- three members
- no director of class B shall be an officer, director, or employee of any bank
- represent the public with due but not exclusive consideration to the interests of agriculture, commerce, industry, services, labor, and consumers.
- member banks are divided into three groups based on size—large, medium, and small banks. Each group elects one member of Class B.

==== Class C ====
- three members
- no director of class C shall be an officer, director, employee, or stockholder of any bank
- designated by the Board of Governors of the Federal Reserve System. They shall be elected to represent the public, and with due but not exclusive consideration to the interests of agriculture, commerce, industry, services, labor, and consumers.
- Shall have been for at least two years residents of the district for which they are appointed, one of whom shall be designated by said board as chairman of the board of directors of the Federal reserve bank and as Federal reserve agent.

A list of all of the members of the Reserve Banks' boards of directors is published by the Federal Reserve.

=== President ===
The Federal Reserve Act provides that the president of a Federal Reserve Bank shall be the chief executive officer of the Bank, appointed by the board of directors of the Bank, with the approval of the Board of Governors of the Federal Reserve System, for a term of five years.

The terms of all the presidents of the twelve District Banks run concurrently, ending on the last day of February every five years. The appointment of a President who takes office after a term has begun ends upon the completion of that term. A president of a Reserve Bank may be reappointed after serving a full term or an incomplete term.

Reserve Bank presidents are subject to mandatory retirement upon becoming 65 years of age. However, presidents initially appointed after age 55 can, at the option of the board of directors, be permitted to serve until attaining ten years of service in the office or age 70, whichever comes first.

=== List of Federal Reserve Banks ===
The Federal Reserve Districts are listed below along with their identifying letter and number. These are used on Federal Reserve Notes to identify the issuing bank for each note. The 25 branches are also listed.

Federal Reserve Bank	Letter	Number	Branches	Website	President
Boston	A	1		https://www.bostonfed.org/	Susan M. Collins
New York City	B	2	Buffalo, New York (closed as of October 31, 2008)	http://www.newyorkfed.org/	John C. Williams
Philadelphia	C	3		http://www.philadelphiafed.org/	Anna Paulson
Cleveland	D	4	Cincinnati, Ohio; Pittsburgh, Pennsylvania	http://www.clevelandfed.org/	Beth M. Hammack
Richmond	E	5	Baltimore, Maryland; Charlotte, North Carolina	http://www.richmondfed.org/	Thomas Barkin
Atlanta	F	6	Birmingham, Alabama; Jacksonville, Florida; Miami, Florida; Nashville, Tennessee; New Orleans, Louisiana	http://www.atlantafed.org/	Cheryl Venable (Interim)
Chicago	G	7	Detroit, Michigan	http://www.chicagofed.org/	Austan Goolsbee
St Louis	H	8	Little Rock, Arkansas; Louisville, Kentucky; Memphis, Tennessee	http://www.stlouisfed.org/	Alberto Musalem
Minneapolis	I	9	Helena, Montana	https://www.minneapolisfed.org/	Neel Kashkari
Kansas City	J	10	Denver, Colorado; Oklahoma City, Oklahoma; Omaha, Nebraska	http://www.kansascityfed.org/	Jeffrey Schmid
Dallas	K	11	El Paso, Texas; Houston, Texas; San Antonio, Texas	http://www.dallasfed.org/	Lorie K. Logan
San Francisco	L	12	Los Angeles, California; Portland, Oregon; Salt Lake City, Utah; Seattle, Washington	http://www.frbsf.org/	Mary C. Daly

== Primary dealers ==
A primary dealer is a bank or securities broker-dealer that may trade directly with the Federal Reserve System of the United States. They are required to make bids or offers when the Fed conducts open market operations, provide information to the Fed's open market trading desk, and to participate actively in U.S. Treasury securities auctions. They consult with both the U.S. Treasury and the Fed about funding the budget deficit and implementing monetary policy. Many former employees of primary dealers work at the Treasury, because of their expertise in the government debt markets, though the Fed avoids a similar revolving door policy.

Between them, these dealers purchase the vast majority of the U.S. Treasury securities (T-bills, T-notes, and T-bonds) sold at auction, and resell them to the public. Their activities extend well beyond the Treasury market, for example, according to the Wall Street Journal Europe (2/9/06 p. 20), all of the top ten dealers in the foreign exchange market are also primary dealers, and between them account for almost 73% of forex trading volume.

The primary dealers form a worldwide network that distributes new U.S. government debt. For example, Daiwa Securities and Mizuho Securities distribute the debt to Japanese buyers. BNP Paribas, Barclays, Deutsche Bank, and RBS Greenwich Capital (a division of the Royal Bank of Scotland) distribute the debt to European buyers. Goldman Sachs, and Citigroup account for many American buyers. Nevertheless, most of these firms compete internationally and in all major financial centers.

== Member banks ==
Each member bank is a private bank (e.g., a privately owned corporation) that holds stock in one of the twelve regional Federal Reserve banks. The amount of stock each member bank must buy is set to be equal to 3% of its combined capital and surplus of stock in the Reserve Bank within its region of the Federal Reserve System. All of the commercial banks in the United States can be divided into three types according to which governmental body charters them and whether or not they are members of the Federal Reserve System:

Type	Definition
National banks	Those chartered by the federal government (through the Office of the Comptroller of the Currency in the Department of the Treasury); by law, they are members of the Federal Reserve System
State member banks	Those chartered by the states who are members of the Federal Reserve System.
State nonmember banks	Those chartered by the states who are not members of the Federal Reserve System.

All nationally chartered banks hold stock in one of the Federal Reserve banks. State-chartered banks may choose to be members (and hold stock in a regional Federal Reserve bank), upon meeting certain standards.

Holding stock in a Federal Reserve bank is not, however, like owning publicly traded stock. The stock cannot be sold or traded. Member banks receive a fixed, 6% dividend annually on their stock, and they do not directly control the applicable Federal Reserve bank as a result of owning this stock. They do, however, elect six of the nine members of Reserve banks' boards of directors. Federal statute provides (in part): "Every national bank in any State shall, upon commencing business or within ninety days after admission into the Union of the State in which it is located, become a member bank of the Federal Reserve System by subscribing and paying for stock in the Federal Reserve bank of its district in accordance with the provisions of this chapter and shall thereupon be an insured bank under the Federal Deposit Insurance Act [. . . .]"

Other banks may elect to become member banks. According to the Federal Reserve Bank of Boston:

Any state-chartered bank (mutual or stock-formed) may become a member of the Federal Reserve System. The twelve regional Reserve Banks supervise state member banks as part of the Federal Reserve System's mandate to assure strength and stability in the nation's domestic markets and banking system. Reserve Bank supervision is carried out in partnership with the state regulators, assuring a consistent and unified regulatory environment. Regional and community banking organizations constitute the largest number of banking organizations supervised by the Federal Reserve System.

—

For example, as of October 2006 the member banks in New Hampshire included Community Guaranty Savings Bank, The Lancaster National Bank, The Pemigewasset National Bank of Plymouth, and other banks. In California, member banks, as of September 2006, included Bank of America California, National Association, The Bank of New York Trust Company, National Association, Barclays Global Investors, National Association, and many other banks.

=== List of member banks ===
The majority of U.S. banks are not members of the Federal Reserve System.

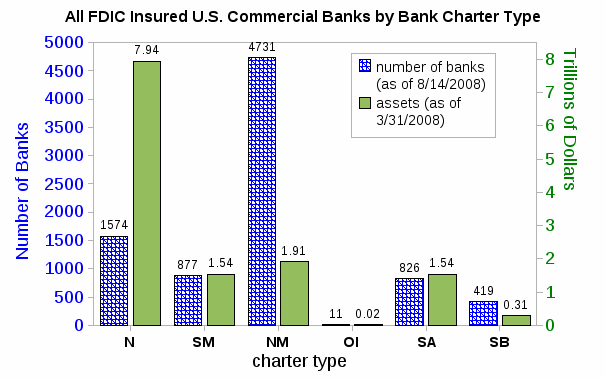

Federal Deposit Insurance Corporation (FDIC)-insured banks, national banks (N) and state members (SM) are members of the Federal Reserve System while the rest of the FDIC-insured banks are not members.

Each charter type is defined as follows:

- N: Commercial bank, national (federal) charter and Fed member, supervised by the Office of the Comptroller of the Currency (OCC) – Dept of Treasury
- SM: Commercial bank, state charter and Fed member, supervised by the Federal Reserve (FRB)
- NM: Commercial bank, state charter and Fed nonmember, supervised by the FDIC
- OI: Insured U.S. branch of a foreign chartered institution (IBA)
- SA: Savings associations, state or federal charter, supervised by the Office of Thrift Supervision (OTS)
- SB: Savings banks, state charter, supervised by the FDIC

While the OI, SA, and SB categories are not members of the system, they are sometimes treated as if they were members under certain circumstances.

A list of all member banks can be found at the website of the Federal Deposit Insurance Corporation (FDIC). Most commercial banks in the United States are not members of the Federal Reserve System, but the total value of all the banking assets of member banks is substantially larger than the total value of the banking assets of nonmembers.

== Advisory committees ==
The Federal Reserve System uses advisory committees in carrying out its varied responsibilities. Three of these committees advise the Board of Governors directly:

- Federal Advisory Council
- Consumer Advisory Council
- Thrift Institutions Advisory Council

Of these advisory committees, perhaps the most important are the committees (one for each Reserve Bank) that advise the Banks on matters of agriculture, small business, and labor. Biannually, the Board solicits the views of each of these committees by mail.
