= List of mergers and acquisitions by GoDaddy =

GoDaddy Inc. is an American publicly traded Internet domain registrar and web hosting company headquartered in Tempe, Arizona and incorporated in Delaware.

== Acquisitions ==
	Date	Company	Business	Country	Price	Price Adjusted	References
1	July 2012	Outright	Accounting and Bookkeeping	United States			
2	August 2013	Locu	Digital Marketing	United States	$70 million	$96.8 million	
3	September 2013	Afternic	Domain Name Marketplace	United States			
4	15 October 2013	Media Temple	Web Hosting	United States			
5	July 2014	Canary	Calendars	United States			
6	20 August 2014	Mad Mimi	Email Marketing	United States			
7	April 2015	Elto	Domain Name Marketplace	United States			
8	22 April 2015	Marchex	Domain Name Portfolio	United States	$28 million	$38 million	
9	7 December 2015	Worldwide Media	Domain Name Portfolio	United States			
10	17 May 2016	FreedomVoice	Cloud VoIP	United States	$42 million	$56.3 million	
11	6 September 2016	ManageWP	Web Hosting	Serbia			
12	6 December 2016	Host Europe Group	Web Hosting	United Kingdom	$1.79 billion	$2.4 million	
13	22 March 2017	Sucuri	Cloud Security	United States			
14	23 January 2018	Main Street Hub	Social Media Marketing	United States	$125 million	$157.4 million	
15	24 September 2018	Plasso	E-Commerce Platform	United States			
16	25 September 2018	Cognate	Blockchain Technology	United States			
17	10 April 2019	Sellbrite	Ecommerce Omni-Channel Marketplace Software	United States			
18	29 January 2020	Over	Graphic Design	United States			
19	11 February 2020	Uniregistry	Domain Registrar & Registry Domain Name Portfolio	Cayman Islands	$196.9 million	$245 million	
20	6 April 2020	Neustar	Domain Registry	United States	$218 million	$271.2 million	
21	15 December 2020	Poynt	Commerce Payment	United States	$365 million	$454.1 million	
22	11 November 2021	Pagely	Web Hosting	United States			
23	23 March 2022	DNAcademy	Domain Name Training	United States			
24	28 June 2022	Dan.com	Domain Name Marketplace	Netherlands	$71.4 million	$78.6 million	

== See also ==
- List of largest mergers and acquisitions
