= Howard L. Morgan =

American businessperson (born 1945)

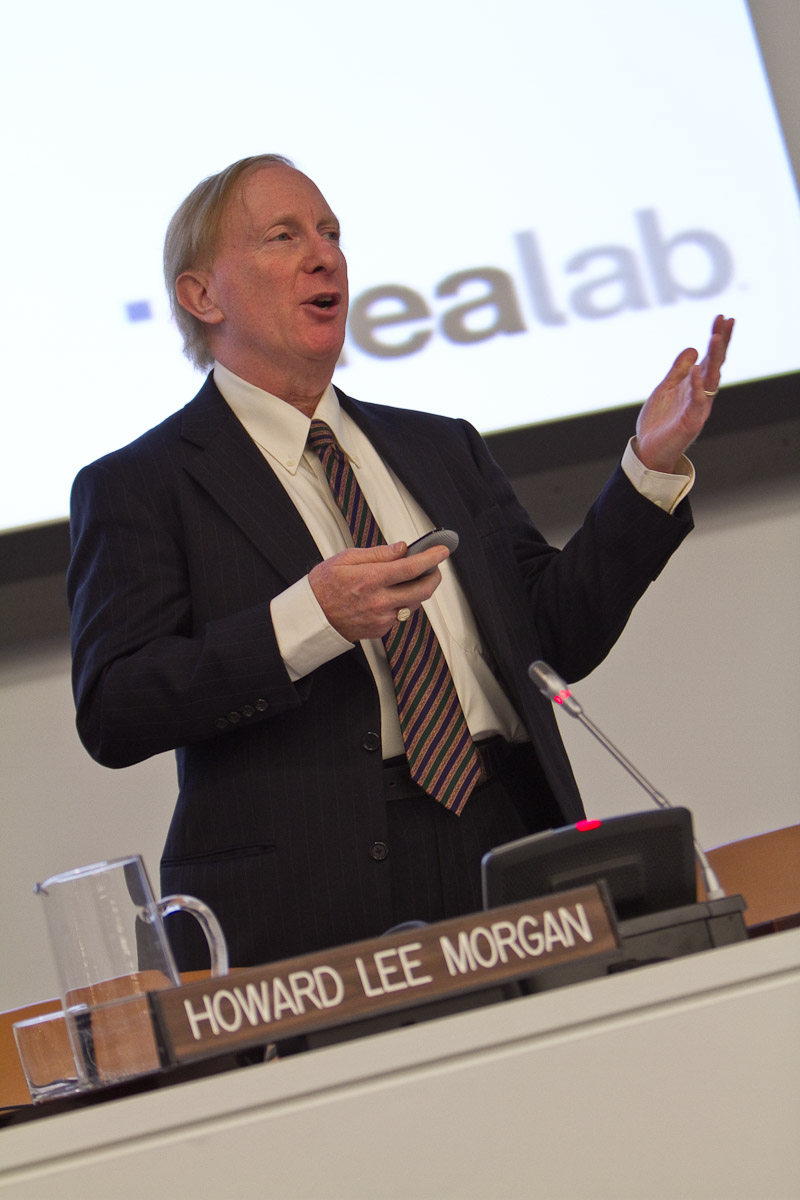
- Howard Morgan (portrait) in 2010.
- Born: November 14, 1945 (age 81); New York City, New York, U.S.
- Education: City College of New York (BS); Cornell University (PhD)
- Occupations: Businessperson; chief executive officer; professor (former)
- Spouse: Eleanor Morgan
- Children: 3, including Beth
- Parent(s): Nat Morgan; Esther Hyman Morgan
- Website: First Round Capital

Howard Lee Morgan (born November 14, 1945) is an American venture capitalist, philanthropist, angel investor, author, and contributor to Business Insider. He also serves as the chairman, CEO, director, board member or advisor for an assortment of companies including B Capital, Arca Group, Idealab, and Math for America. He has been listed on the Forbes 2009 list of Executives and Directors, was ranked No. 12 on CloudAve's Top 30 Most Respected Venture Capitalist for 2011 and #1 in Philadelphia.

== Early life and education ==
Howard Morgan attended the City College of the City University of New York in 1965 where he earned a Bachelor of Science in physics. He then received a Ph.D. in operations research from Cornell University in 1968. Morgan was also awarded an honorary Master of Arts degree in 1974 from the University of Pennsylvania.

== Career ==
=== Academic career (1968–1985) ===
After earning his Ph.D. from Cornell University, Morgan was granted a faculty position with their Department of Computer Science in September 1968. He went on to work as Professor of Decision Sciences at the Wharton School of the University of Pennsylvania and also Professor of Computer Science at the Moore School at the University of Pennsylvania. During his academic career Morgan also served as an editor of Communications of the ACM, Management Science, Transactions on Office Information Systems and Transactions on Database Systems. His research on user interface technology, and on optimization of computer networks led to his bringing the ARPAnet to Philadelphia in 1974. As a result of this early participation in the Internet, he advised many corporate and government agencies on the uses of electronic and voice mail, implementing it throughout the Wharton School in the mid-1970s. Morgan continued to work as a professor from 1972 through 1985.

=== Entrepreneurship ===
Howard Morgan's decision to transition from class to corporate capital was based on the technological expansions of the 1980s. The private sector of the time saw small startups like Microsoft make billions and potential for other revolutions in the industry were just as possible.

In 1982 he was one of the original team members at Renaissance Technologies Corp., founded by James Simons. And from 1983 to 1989 served as president where he supervised venture capital investments in high technology companies. He was also a founding board member and technical advisor of Franklin Electronic Publishers, one of the first manufacturers of personal computers, before its sale. He has been an active consultant and speaker to users and vendors in the information systems area for more than 30 years, and has worked with many of the Fortune 100 companies and numerous government agencies. As of 2025 he sits on the board of robot maker, Apptronik.

=== Authorship ===
After working with the Association for Computing Machinery, he was published continuously in a number of their publications from the mid-1970s to the early 1980s. The notice from his work in the early stages of the Internet prompted Morgan to begin authoring a number of his own books on the subject. Since the early 1970s to the present, he has published many books ranging from computer science, business investment, and marketing.

Books

- Morgan, Howard (1973). Implementation of Complex Management Information Systems. Defense Technical Information Center.
- Morgan, Howard (1975). ASAP to REL: Efficient Relational Data Bases from Very Large Files. Defense Technical Information Center.
- Morgan, Howard (1976). WAND Demonstration. Defense Technical Information Center.
- Morgan, Howard (1979). Office of the Future Seminar. CIA.
- Morgan, Howard (1982). MDM: embedding the time dimension in information systems. University of Pennsylvania.
- Morgan, Howard (1982). 1982 National Computer Conference. AFIPS Press. ISBN 0-88283-035-X.
- Lodish, Leonard; Morgan, Howard (2001). Entrepreneurial Marketing: Lessons from Wharton's Pioneering M.B.A. Course. John Wiley & Sons.
- Lodish, Leonard; Morgan, Howard (2009). Marketing That Works: How Entrepreneurial Marketing Can Add Sustainable Value to Any Sized Company. Wharton School Publishing. ISBN 978-0-13-702133-8.

=== Venture capital ===
Since 1989, he has been president of the Arca Group, Inc., a consulting and venture capital investment management firm specializing in the area of computer and communications technologies. Arca Group nurtures ventures and has taken them from seed stage through initial public offerings, including MetaCreations Corporation (now Viewpoint Corporation), a computer graphics software company, Infonautics Corporation( now Tucows), which provides search products and services on the internet and MyPoints.com, Inc.(now part of United Airlines New Ventures) – the leading direct e-mail provider.

He has been involved in more than three dozen startups and was a lead investor in the formation of Bill Gross’s Idealab, a Pasadena based incubator for internet companies. Idealab also founded Internet Brands which operates many media and e-commerce websites. Howard Morgan served as a board member on Internet Brands until the media company was acquired in December 2010 by Hellman & Friedman for a reported $640 million.

In 2004 Morgan partnered with Josh Kopelman to form the venture capital firm, First Round Capital, later adding Chris Fralic and Rob Hayes as partners. The group specialized in providing seed-stage funds to technology companies. The Philadelphia-based firm is reported to provide seed-stage investments that have ranged between $250,000 to $500,000. In addition, the company has backed companies including Uber, Roblox, Upstart, Planet.com, Climate Corp, Augury Technologies, Outright, LinkedIn, SkillSlate and several hundred other firms. He is also an investor and advisor to over a dozen diverse venture funds, including 645 Ventures, Moxxie Ventures and others.

In 2017, after retiring from First Round Capital, Morgan joined B Cap Group as chairman, where he oversees the firm's investment, product strategy, partnership and development efforts. In 2022, B Capital raised $250 million to form the Ascent Fund for investment in early stage startups.

Morgan was ranked No. 12 in the 2011's Top 30 Most Respected Venture Capitalist and in 2025 he was inducted into the National Venture Capital Association's Venture Vanguard class.

=== Philanthropy ===
After receiving the Entrepreneur of the Year award in 1997, Howard Morgan and his wife Eleanor decided to establish the Eleanor and Howard Morgan Foundation. Their foundation has since made many contributions to a host of other charities including but not limited to the Chabad on Campus International Foundation, Math for America, Cold Spring Harbor Laboratory, the Public Radio station WNYC and many more over the years. They also helped to fund the 90-minute television program in 2002 entitled 'New York in Song' which featured great songs and obscure songs about New York to raise funds to provide college scholarships for children of victims of the 9/11 terrorist attacks. In 2022, Morgan provided funding to Cornell University for two Eleanor and Howard Morgan Professorships. In 2022, Morgan was named Chairman of the Mabel Mercer Foundation.

== Family ==
Howard Morgan is married to Eleanor Morgan, an interior designer in Villanova and New York. They have three daughters, Kimberly, Elizabeth, and Danielle.
