= Sandra Pianalto =

American economist (born 1954)

10th President of the Federal Reserve Bank of Cleveland
- In office February 1, 2003 – May 31, 2014
- Preceded by: Jerry Jordan
- Succeeded by: Loretta J. Mester

Personal details
- Born: August 2, 1954 (age 72) Valli del Pasubio, Italy
- Education: University of Akron (BA); George Washington University (MA)

Sandra Pianalto (born August 4, 1954) is an economist. She previously served as the tenth chief executive of the Fourth District Federal Reserve Bank, in Cleveland from 2003 to 2014.

== Early life and education ==
Pianalto was born in Valli del Pasubio, Italy. She earned a bachelor's degree in economics from the University of Akron and a master's degree in economics from The George Washington University. She is a graduate of the Advanced Management Program at Duke University's Fuqua School of Business and holds honorary doctor of humane letters degrees from the University of Akron, Baldwin-Wallace College, Kent State University, and Ursuline College. Pianalto also received an honorary doctor of business administration degree from Cleveland State University.

== Professional career ==
Pianalto's tenure with the Bank spans more than twenty years. She joined the Bank in 1983 as an economist in the Research Department. She was appointed assistant vice president of public affairs in 1984, vice president and secretary to the board of directors in 1988, and first vice president and chief operating officer in 1993. She assumed her position as president in 2003. Before joining the Bank, Ms. Pianalto was an economist at the Board of Governors of the Federal Reserve System and served on the staff of the Budget Committee of the U.S. House of Representatives.

Pianalto is active in the Fourth District's civic community. She serves on the boards of directors of many community organizations, including The Cleveland Foundation, the Greater Cleveland Partnership, University Hospitals Health System, United Way Services of Cleveland, the Rock and Roll Hall of Fame and Museum, the Northeast Ohio Council on Higher Education, the Catholic Diocese of Cleveland Foundation, and the Ohio Business Alliance for Higher Education and the Economy.

On August 8, 2013, Pianalto announced she would retire as Cleveland's Fed President "early next year.". She retired on May 31, 2014.

Prudential Financial, Inc. (NYSE:PRU) announced on June 9, 2015, that Sandra Pianalto has been elected to the company's Board of Directors as an independent director, effective July 1, 2015.

Other offices
Preceded by Jerry Jordan	President of the Federal Reserve Bank of Cleveland; 2003–2014	Succeeded by Loretta J. Mester
