= Back-office software =

Business operations managing software

Retail back-office software is used to manage business operations that are not related to direct sales efforts and interfaces that are not seen by consumers. Typically, the business processes managed with back-office software include some combination of inventory control, price book management, manufacturing, and supply chain management (SCM). Back-office software is distinct from front-office software, which typically refers to customer relationship management (CRM) software used for managing sales, marketing, and other customer-centric activities.

Back-office software solutions have evolved with the emergence of cloud-based software as a service (SaaS). Several back-office software providers offer cloud-based services that simplify and streamline back-office management functions, particularly for companies with multiple locations. These simplified platforms have given companies an alternative to business process outsourcing (BPO), which involves handing over the management of a company's back office to a third-party service provider. With back-office software, companies can derive actionable intelligence from the system without any particular expertise.

== Cloud-based back-office software ==
Cloud-based back-office software provides the functionality necessary to manage numerous back-office functions from a single web-based interface. Many back-office software platforms can be accessed from both mobile and desktop devices, and are cross compatible with back-office accounting software such as QuickBooks.

Some of the most common back-office software functionality options include:

- Item-level inventory management
- Cash register management/point of sale (POS) management
- Price book management
- Loyalty program management
- Sales promotion
- Sales forecasting
- Data exchange (e.g. electronic data interchange (EDI))
- Invoice processing
- Key performance indicator (KPI) monitoring (e.g. gross margin, profit margin)
- Workflow management
- Business reporting

== Applications ==
=== Franchises ===
Cloud-based back-office solutions are used by franchisors for sales, inventory, and price book management. Franchisors can control inventory prices, optimize inventory supply based on projections, manage company-wide promotions, and monitor sales performance at each franchisee location from one centralized platform.

=== Convenience and retail stores ===
Companies in the convenience and retail industries use back-office software to manage inventory and identify opportunities to improve profit margins by keeping popular items in stock, preventing spoilage and shrink, as well as reducing overstock of unpopular items (by offering discounts and promotions, for example). Software allows back-office store operators to forecast inventory levels based on sales volumes and therefore optimize the store's turnover ratios (the ratio of how many times inventory is sold and replaced over a given period). Moreover, the measurement of inventory performance data allows store operators to benchmark their performance with published industry averages (e.g. from the National Association of Convenience Stores).

Though turnover ratios depend on demand-side factors such as how desirable a product is, they can be increased through efficient back-office management. For instance, a case study involving a Pittsburgh-based convenience store operator showed that the company was able to achieve an average turnover ratio of 16.12 (compared to the 2013 US convenience store average of 11.36) by using cloud-based back-office software for inventory management.

Back-office software can also be used to account for the effects of demand substitution and subsequently determine the optimal inventory level for each item stocked. Researchers have attempted to predict the increases in demand for complementary items (resulting from demand substitution) using a probabilistic model for selecting item inventory levels in order to maximize expected profit. Another study employed a stochastic model to optimize the inventory management process at Spain-based retailer Zara: the new model increased sales by $275 million (3–4%) in 2007 and Zara continues to use the process for all of its products and at all retail locations.

=== Accounting ===
According to research from IDC Industry Insights, more than half of all small businesses in the US use Intuit software (Quickbooks) for accounting. But with the growth of the SaaS market, Quickbooks along with other emerging online accounting options such as Omega POS or Outright and Mint.com are now being adopted. These options are simple to use, but may have limited functionality compared to desktop accounting solutions.

Accounting software is often integrated into or connected to back-office software for inventory management to simplify the exchange of store data between operational and other retail systems.

=== Supply chain ===
Supply chain managers use back-office software to match sales data with supply chain data and to streamline product ordering. All of the steps in supply chain management (SCM), including procurement, conversion, transportation, distribution, and partner coordination/collaboration can be controlled via back-office software. This process of enhanced information sharing and supply chain streamlining has been demonstrated to decrease supply chain costs by an average of 2.2%.

Though back-office software reduces the likelihood of inventory record inaccuracies, they can still occur if items are not properly tracked as they enter/exit the retail space. One way to limit the impact of record inaccuracy is to use a Bayesian belief network of the physical inventory, creating a probability distribution that is updated as inventory inaccuracies are discovered. The application of Bayesian principles to inventories can avoid instances of inventory freezing (when physical inventory levels reach zero but records indicate otherwise).

=== Human resources ===
There are many cloud-based HR solutions available for payroll management, timesheet tracking, and hiring. Using cloud-based HR software for payroll management is particularly advantageous because the software usually has up-to-date information on local tax rules, which otherwise require specialized tax knowledge. HR departments use back-office software to match labor supply with demand based on sales forecasts.

== See also ==
- Inventory control
- Inventory management software
- Stock management
- Back office
