= Zonal =

Zonal may refer to:

- Zonal and meridional, directions on a globe, west–east and north–south, respectively
- Zonal and poloidal, directions in a toroidal magnetically confined plasma
- Zonal polynomial, a symmetric multivariate polynomial
- Zonal pelargonium, a type of pelargoniums
- Zonal (chess), a type of chess tournament
- Electronic musicians Zonal, previously known as Techno Animal
- Zonal (company), a UK based, privately owned company that provides EPoS systems
