= Beth M. Hammack =

American economist, academic, and public servant

Beth Hammack
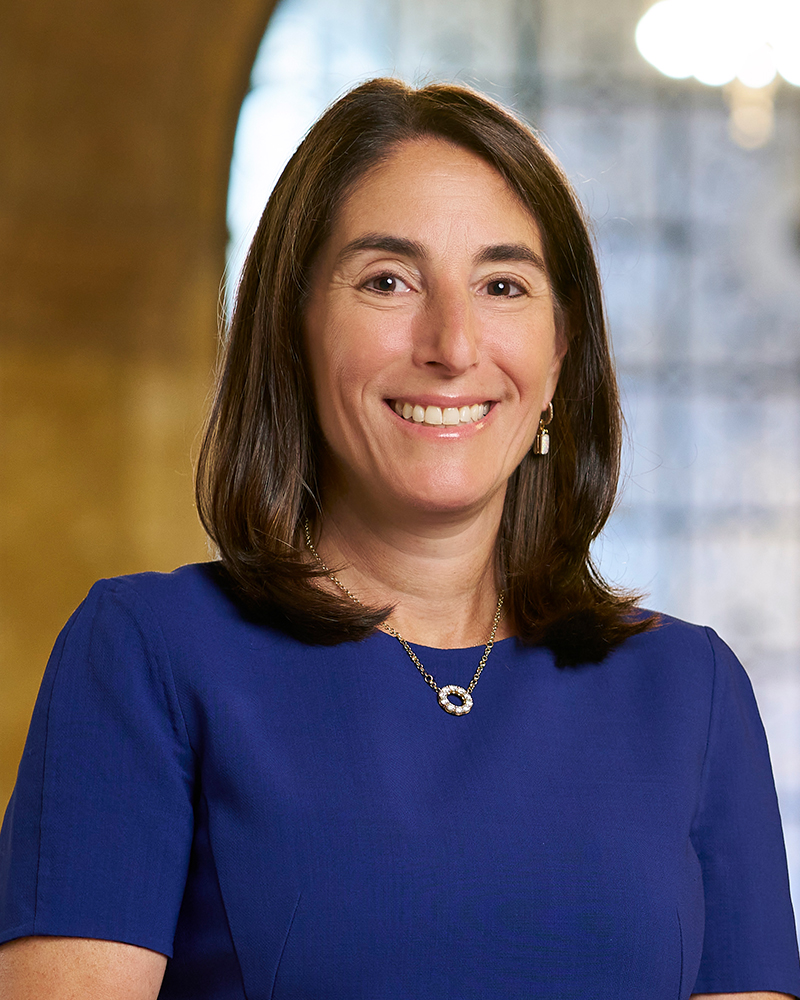

12th President of the Federal Reserve Bank of Cleveland
- Incumbent
- Assumed office August 21, 2024
- Preceded by: Loretta J. Mester

Personal details
- Born: Elizabeth Stacy Morgan; 1971 or 1972 (age 54–55) California, U.S.
- Spouse: Peter Hammack (m. 2000)
- Children: 2
- Relatives: Howard L. Morgan (father)
- Education: Stanford University (BA)

Elizabeth Stacy Morgan Hammack (née Morgan; born 1971/1972) is the 12th president and CEO of the Federal Reserve Bank of Cleveland. Prior to that, Hammack worked at Goldman Sachs for three decades before resigning in 2024 as the co-head of global finance.

== Early life ==
Hammack was born in California to Howard L. Morgan, a venture capitalist, and a mother who worked as an interior designer. She grew up in Villanova, Pennsylvania and is the middle of three sisters. In 1989, she graduated from The Baldwin School located in Bryn Mawr, Pennsylvania.

Hammack earned a bachelor's degree from Stanford University in 1993 with a combined major in quantitative economics and history. During her academic career, Hammack was part of a council of student presidents at Stanford that included John Louie, who played the Wing Kid in the 1984 film Gremlins and John Overdeck, co-founder and co-chairman of Two Sigma Investments. She interned twice at the Philadelphia Stock Exchange during her summer breaks. Hammack was accepted to Harvard Business School but decided not to attend.

== Goldman Sachs ==
She joined Goldman Sachs in 1993 as an analyst in Debt Capital Markets, was named managing director in 2003, and partner in 2010. Throughout her time, she held roles as global treasurer, global head of short-term macro trading, and global head of repo trading. Hammack was former chair of the Treasury Borrowing Advisory Committee; and a former member of the Treasury Market Practices Group, the Financial Research Advisory Committee, and management committee.

Before her departure, Hammack served as the co-head of the Global Financing Group.

== Federal Reserve Bank of Cleveland ==
Hammack was appointed the president and chief executive officer of the Cleveland Fed in May 2024. Her term began on August 21, and in this role, she represents the Fourth Federal Reserve District on the Federal Open Market Committee in the formulation of U.S. monetary policy. She is the fourth woman selected to lead the Federal Reserve Bank of Cleveland, the first regional Federal Reserve bank to appoint a female president in 1982.

In December 2024 Hammack was the only Federal Open Market Committee member to vote against a quarter-point cut in the federal funds rate. She wanted to keep the target range at 4.5 to 4.75 percent, pointing to uneven progress on inflation, the strength of the economy and the labor market, and financial conditions.

== Personal life ==
Hammack married investment banker Peter Hammack in 2000. The couple has two sons and live in Cleveland.

Hammack serves as a board member of Math for America and City Harvest.

Other offices
Preceded by Loretta J. Mester	President of the Federal Reserve Bank of Cleveland; 2024–present	Incumbent
