= Virb =

Virb Inc
- Company type: Private
- Available in: English
- Founded: Los Angeles, California
- Headquarters: Los Angeles
- Area served: Worldwide
- Founder: Brad Smith
- Key people: Brad Smith (chairman and CEO)
- Parent: Media Temple
- Website: www.virb.com
- Registration: Required
- Launched: 9 March 2007
- Current status: Defunct

Virb was a website owned by Media Temple that let individuals and businesses create their own websites. Users added web content using simple tools and then customized the design of their site using built-in options or with CSS and HTML. They could also connect to networking websites such as Twitter.

== History ==
After the launch of PureVolume in 2003, Unborn Media attempted to mimic the website's success by launching Virb, where PureVolume focused primarily on music, Virb would focus on more social features. Virb was launched, as an invite-only beta form in 2006, and was publicly launched in March 2007. Virb was highly praised in 2007 by the Houston Press for its unique design, customisation, and innovative features, such as iTunes integration. Virb was widely heralded as the possible successor to MySpace, due to the site's similar layout and functionality. Virb failed to attract a wider audience, and by the end of 2007, Facebook passed both Virb and MySpace in terms of monthly active users. In early 2008, Virb was listed as one of the biggest technology disappointments of 2007 by PC Advisor, among other websites, due to its focus on social networking basics, and lack of innovative features.

The web hosting company Media Temple purchased it in June 2008, despite its failure, and in August 2010 relaunched as a do-it-yourself website builder. Smith stated that the "core desire wasn't ever to build and run a social network. [They] wanted to build this really cool niche area for the people MySpace didn't really work for." In July 2012, Virb announced that it had officially joined the Media Temple family of products, promising new features, more dedicated customer support, and better system monitoring. In 2014, GoDaddy.com acquired Media Temple and its subsidiaries, including Virb. Soon after, changing leadership priorities led most of the Virb development team to depart, though GoDaddy kept a small skeleton crew to maintain existing functionality and keep the site running. GoDaddy shut down Virb in June 2020 without warning its customers, leaving many without migration plans or backups of their work. The Virb.com homepage left only a eulogy message, reading "After 10 years proudly helping customers like you with Virb, we have made the difficult decision to discontinue the platform."
