= Karen N. Horn =

American economist

6th President of the Federal Reserve Bank of Cleveland
- In office 1982–1987
- Preceded by: Willis J. Winn
- Succeeded by: W. Lee Hoskins

Personal details
- Born: Karen N. Horn; 1944 (age 80–81) California, U.S.
- Education: Pomona College (AB); Johns Hopkins University PhD)

Karen N. Horn (born 1944) is an American economist who served as the 6th president and CEO of the Federal Reserve Bank of Cleveland from 1982 to 1987. She was the first woman to lead any of the 12 regional Federal Reserve Banks.

Other offices
Preceded by Willis J. Winn	President of the Federal Reserve Bank of Cleveland; 1982–1987	Succeeded by W. Lee Hoskins
