= Loretta J. Mester =

American businesswoman

Loretta Mester
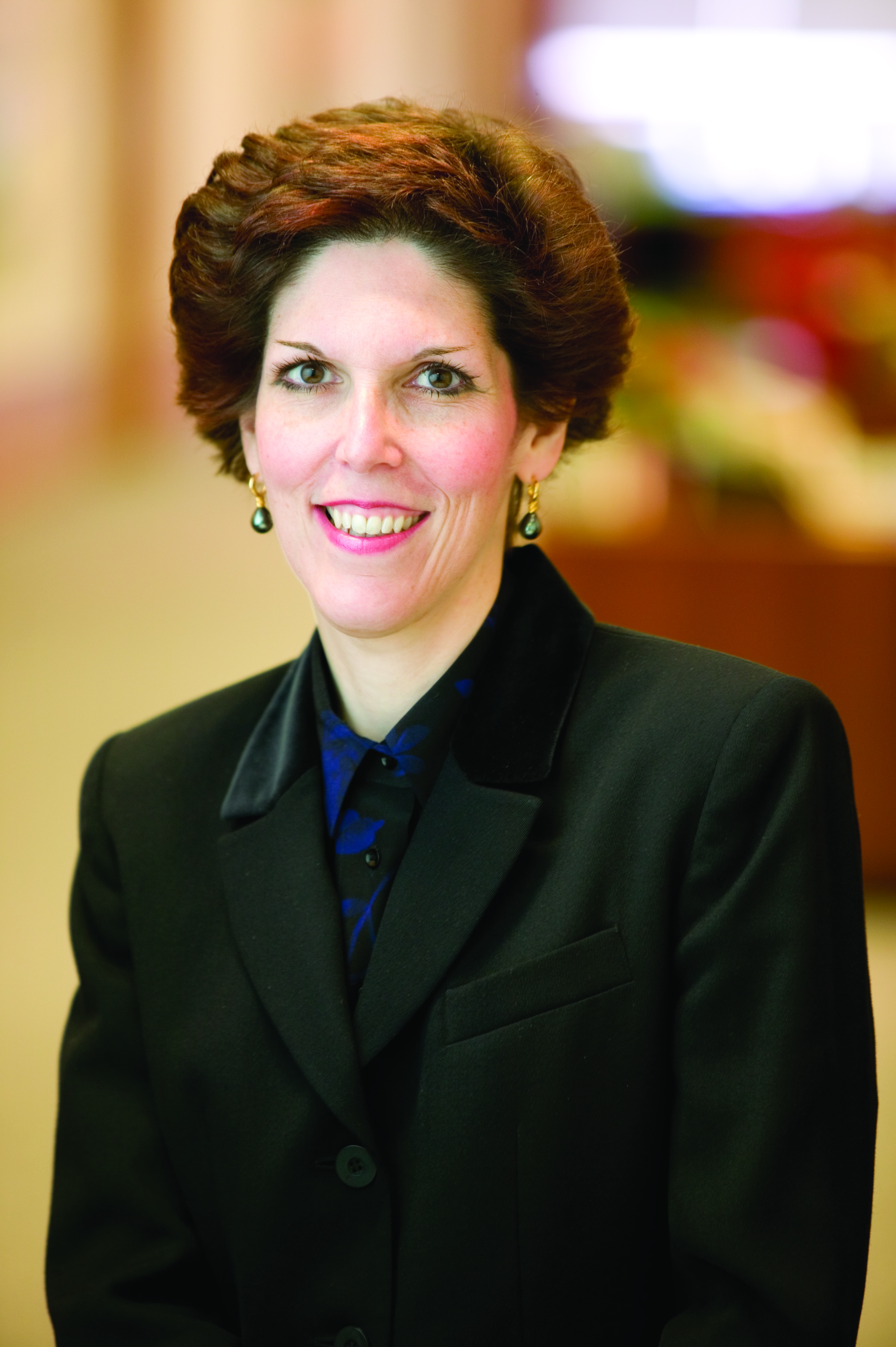

11th President of the Federal Reserve Bank of Cleveland
- In office June 1, 2014 – June 30, 2024
- Preceded by: Sandra Pianalto
- Succeeded by: Beth M. Hammack

Personal details
- Born: October 24, 1958 (age 68) Baltimore, Maryland, U.S.
- Education: Barnard College (BA); Princeton University (MA, PhD)

Loretta Jean Mester (born October 24, 1958) was president and CEO of the Federal Reserve Bank of Cleveland.

== Personal life ==
Mester was born in Baltimore, Maryland on October 24, 1958. She is married to George Mailath, an economist at the University of Pennsylvania.

== Education ==
Mester has a Bachelor of Arts degree from Barnard College in Mathematics and Economics and a Masters and Ph.D. in economics from Princeton University. She was also a National Science Foundation Fellow at Princeton.

== Career ==
Mester began her career at the Federal Reserve Bank of Philadelphia in 1985 as an economist and later became its executive vice president and director of research. Mester has taught in both the MBA and BA business courses at Wharton and the Ph.D. finance course at New York University.

Mester became the president and CEO of the Federal Reserve Bank of Cleveland on June 1, 2014. She was the 11th president and CEO of Cleveland's Fourth District Federal Reserve Bank.

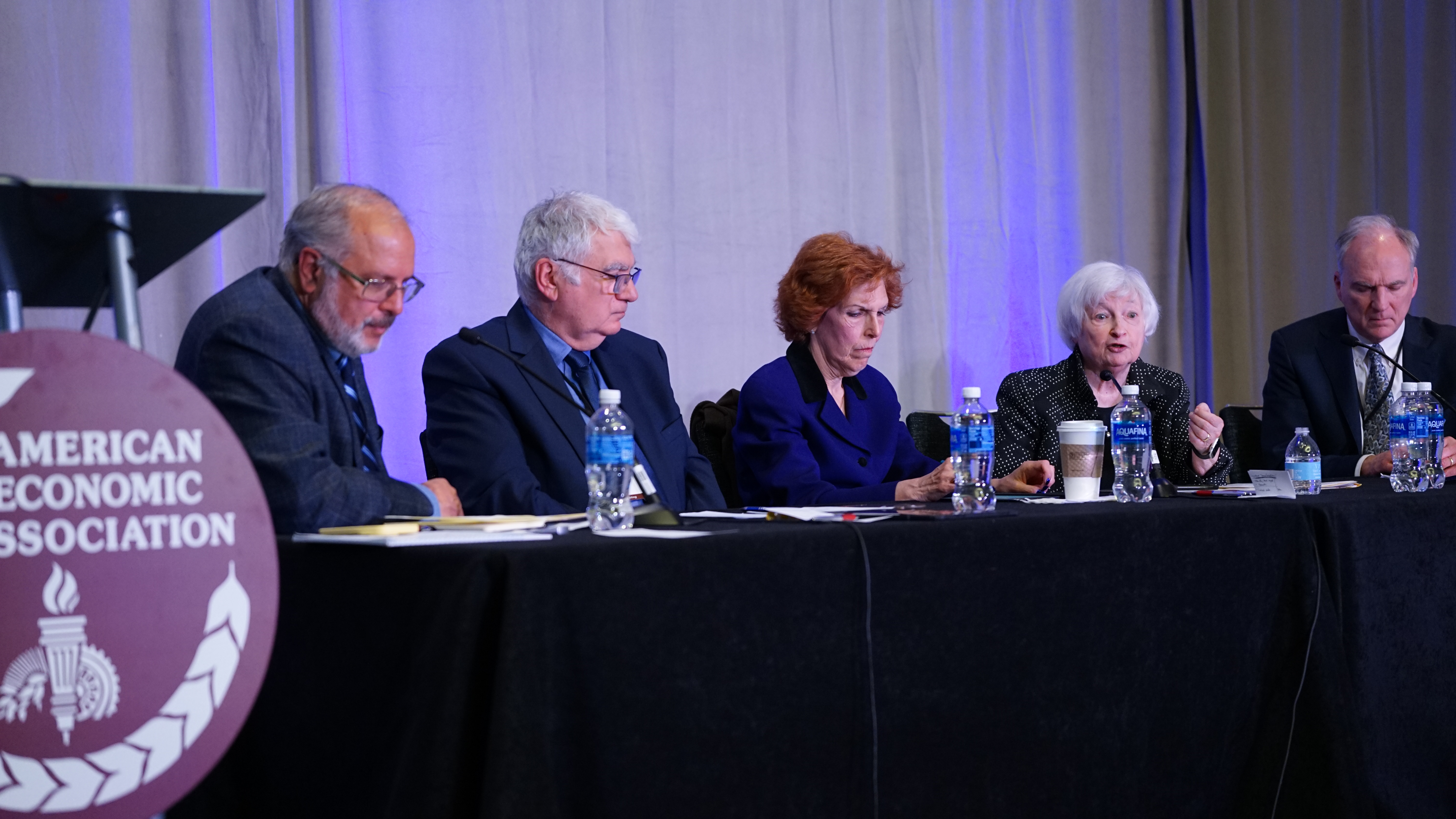
Anil Kashyap, Athanasios Orphanides, Mester, Janet Yellen, David Romer at ASSA 2026

Mester is an adjunct professor of finance at the Wharton School of the University of Pennsylvania and a fellow at the Wharton Financial Institutions Center. Other positions Mester holds include: director of both the Greater Cleveland Partnership and of the Council for Economic Education, trustee of both the Cleveland Clinic and the Musical Arts Association (the Cleveland Orchestra), founding director of the Financial Intermediation Research Society, member of the advisory board of the Financial Intermediation Network of European Studies (FINEST). Her professional memberships include the American Economic Association, the American Finance Association, the Econometric Society, and the Financial Management Association International.

== Publications ==
Mester has published articles in various journals on the subjects of central banking, economics and finance. She is co-editor of the Journal of Financial Services Research and the International Journal of Central Banking. She is an associate editor of: the Journal of Financial Intermediation; Journal of Money, Credit, and Banking; Journal of Economics and Business; Research in Banking and Finance; and Journal of Financial Stability.

== Philanthropy ==
Mester is a director of the Greater Cleveland Partnership, a director of the Council for Economic Education, a trustee of the Cleveland Clinic, a trustee of the Musical Arts Association (Cleveland Orchestra), a founding director of the Financial Intermediation Research Society, and a member of the advisory board of the Financial Intermediation Network of European Studies (FINEST).

Other offices
Preceded by Sandra Pianalto	President of the Federal Reserve Bank of Cleveland; 2014–2024	Succeeded by Beth M. Hammack
