= Federal Reserve Bank of Cleveland =

Member Bank of Federal Reserve

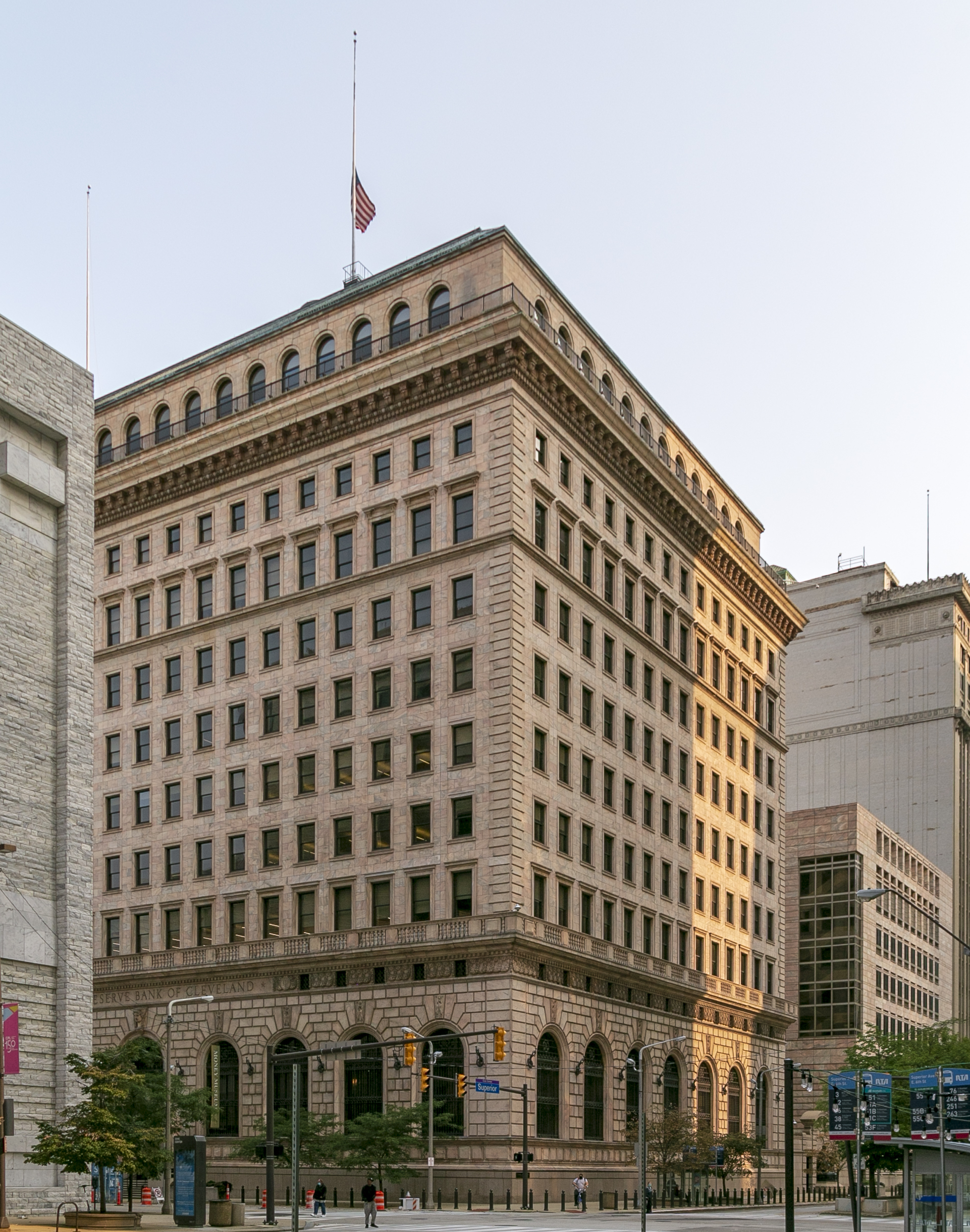
- The Federal Reserve Bank of Cleveland in 2020
- Central bank of: Fourth District: Ohio; Parts of: Kentucky; Pennsylvania; West Virginia
- Headquarters: E. 6th St. and Superior Ave. Cleveland, Ohio, U.S.
- Coordinates: 41°30′6.98″N 81°41′25″W
- Established: May 18, 1914 (112 years ago)
- President: Beth M. Hammack
- Website: clevelandfed.org
- The Federal Reserve Bank of Cleveland is one of 12 regional banks that make up the Federal Reserve System

The Federal Reserve Bank of Cleveland is one of the twelve Federal Reserve Banks of the United States. It is responsible for the Fourth District of the Federal Reserve System, which encompasses Ohio, western Pennsylvania, eastern Kentucky, and the northern panhandle of West Virginia. The district is headquartered in Cleveland and has branch offices in Cincinnati and Pittsburgh. Since 2024, Beth M. Hammack has been serving as the bank's chief executive officer and president.

== Building ==
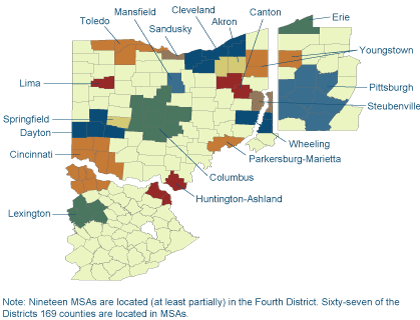
Map of the Fourth District

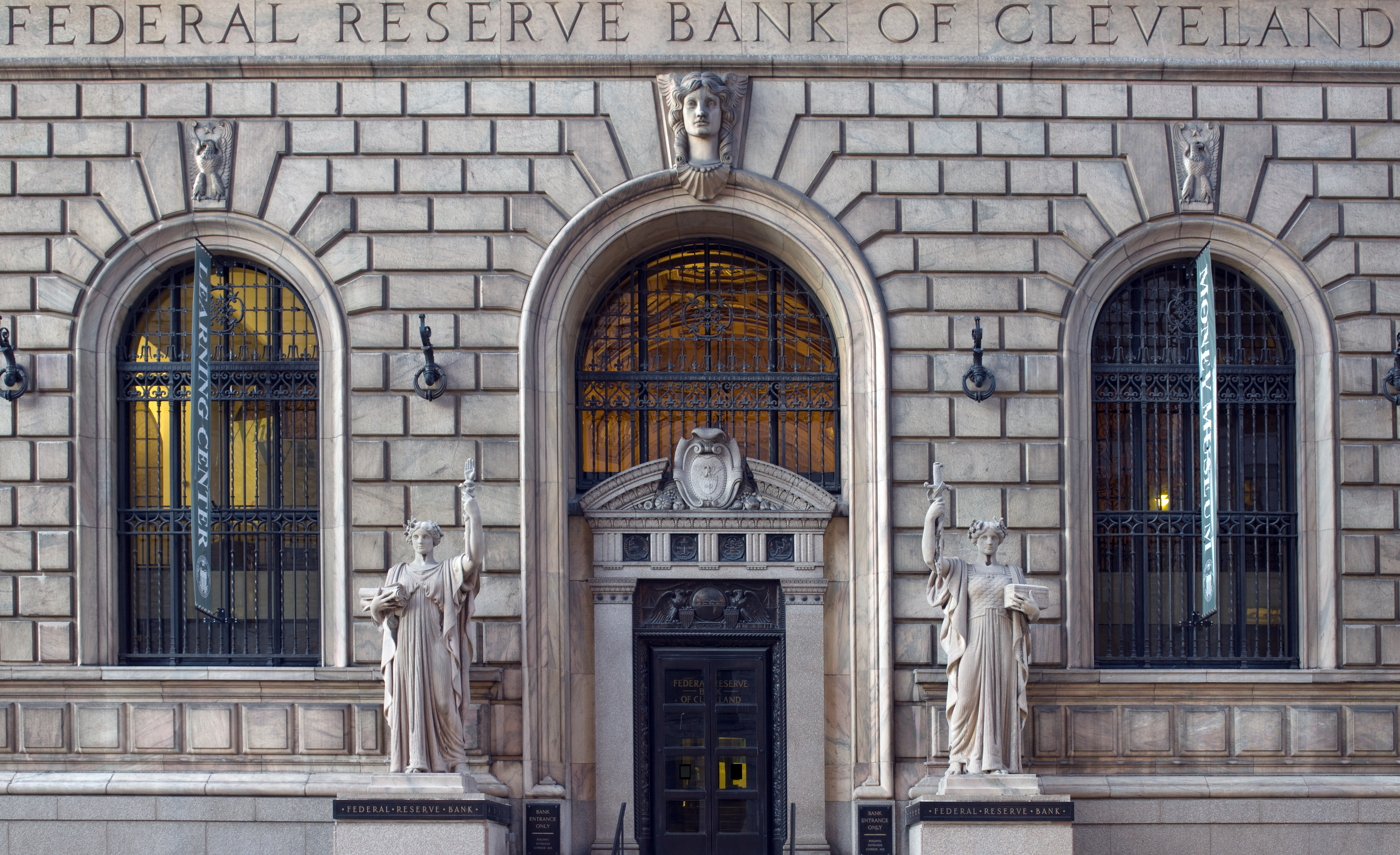
Bank entrance on East 6th Street in Downtown Cleveland.

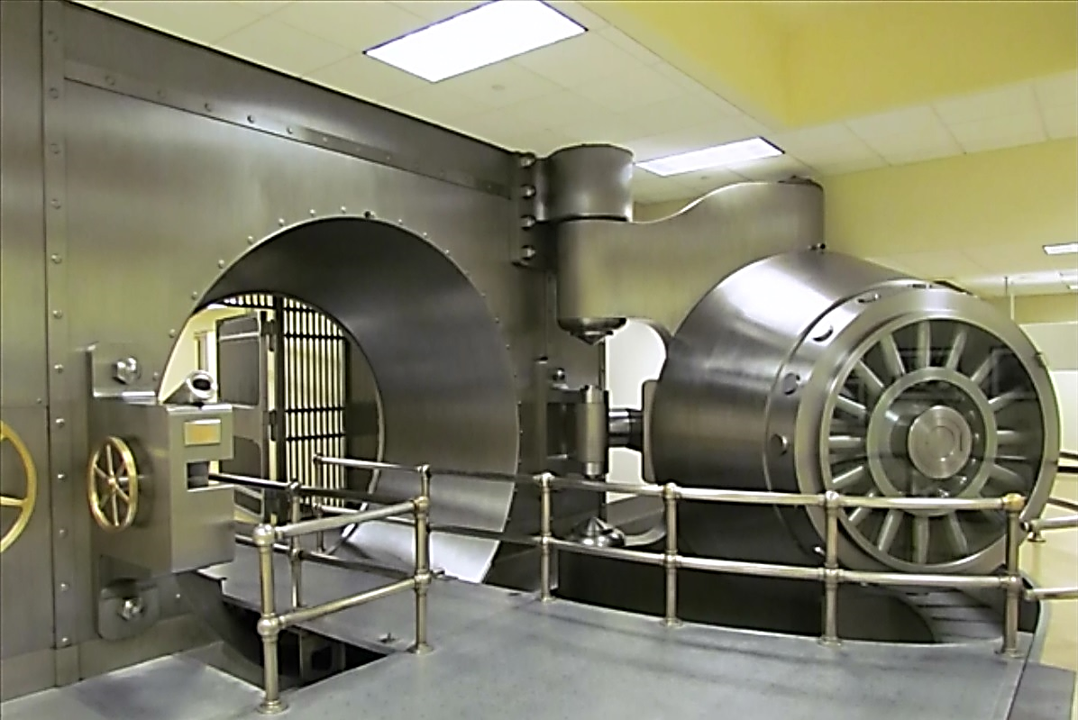
The vault door with combination viewer was designed by Frederick S. Holmes and built by York Safe & Lock Co.

The bank building is a 13-story 203 foot high-rise, located at Superior Avenue and East 6th Street in downtown Cleveland. It was designed by the Cleveland firm of Walker and Weeks and completed in 1923. Its exterior architecture emulates an Italian Renaissance palazzo, and is clad in Georgia pink marble. An extension to the building designed by HOK was completed in 1998, providing new facilities for check processing and cash handling. The building is listed on the National Register of Historic Places. The building's entrances feature allegorical sculptures by Henry Hering representing Security and Integrity flanking the East Sixth Street entrance, while his Energy watches the Superior Avenue entry.

Its original 100 short tons (91 t) bank vault door is the largest in the world and was designed by Frederick S. Holmes. The door casting itself was 20 short tons (18 t). It incorporates the largest hinge ever built. The hinge has an overall height of 19 feet (5.8 m) and weighs over 47 short tons (43 t) fully assembled. The vault's use was discontinued in 1997, though it is preserved intact for posterity.

In 1994 construction of the connecting operations center began. It was designed by HOK. Construction of the new operations center was completed in 1998, providing new facilities for check processing and cash handling. The operations center building is eight stories tall. The exterior is built using pink Georgia marble like the main Federal Reserve building. This new operations center is built on the site of a parking lot that sat between the Federal Reserve building and the Superior Building.

In January 2006, the bank opened the Learning Center and Money Museum, replacing the public teller windows vacated after September 11, 2001. Over 30 hands-on exhibits focus on the history of money, its effects on societies and cultures, and its central role in peoples' lives. The museum is open from Monday through Thursday, except for bank holidays, and admission is free.

The museum includes a variety of activities and multi-media experiences to educate visitors, including computerized games about trading, writing contests, crayon rubbings, videos, speeches, films, and virtual tours, One recent addition to the Learning Center and Money Museum is the documentary titled "The Panic of 1907" which details how the panic led to the creation of the Federal Reserve System. This film was produced by Joseph G. Haubrich and the Federal Reserve Bank of Cleveland.

== Board of directors ==
The following people are listed as on the board of directors as of 2024. Class A directors are elected by member banks to represent member banks. Class B directors are elected by member banks to represent the public. Class C directors are appointed by the Board of Governors to represent the public. Terms always expire on December 31 of their final year on the board.

Members of Board of Directors
Director	Title	Director Class	Term Expires
James H. Nicholson	President and Chief Executive Officer, North Valley Bank, Zanesville, Ohio	A	2026
Eddie L. Steiner	President and Chief Executive Officer, CSB Bancorp, Inc, Millersburg, Ohio	A	2024
Helga Houston	Senior Executive Vice President and Chief Risk Officer, Huntington Bancshares Inc., Columbus, Ohio	A	2025
Darrell McNair	President, MVP Plastics, Inc., Middlefield, Ohio	B	2026
Jacqueline Gamblin	Chief Executive Officer, JYG Innovations, Dayton, Ohio	B	2024
Holly B. Wiedemann	Founder, AU Associates, Inc., Lexington, Kentucky	B	2025
Heidi L. Gartland (Chair)	Chief Government and Community Relations Officer, University Hospitals Cleveland Medical Center, Cleveland, Ohio	C	2025
Richard J. Kramer (Vice Chair)	Former Chairman, Chief Executive Officer, and President, The Goodyear Tire & Rubber Company, Akron, Ohio	C	2024
Ramona Hood	Former President and Chief Executive Officer, FedEx Custom Critical, Richfield, Ohio	C	2026

== Governor and presidents ==
The position was installed under the title of "Governor" until the Banking Act of 1935 abolished the dual role of governor and agent and created a single leadership role – president.

#	Portrait	CEO	Life span	Term start	Term end	Tenure length	Ref
Governors
1		Elvadore R. Fancher*	1864–1935	November 2, 1914	January 16, 1935	20 years, 75 days	
Presidents
2		Matthew J. Fleming	1879–1962	January 19, 1935	September 15, 1944	9 years, 240 days	
3		Ray M. Gidney	1887–1978	November 1, 1944	April 16, 1953	8 years, 166 days	
4		Wilbur D. Fulton	1898–1964	May 14, 1953	April 30, 1963	9 years, 351 days	
5		W. Braddock Hickman*	1911–1970	May 1, 1963	November 28, 1970	7 years, 211 days	
6		Willis J. Winn	1917-2002	September 1, 1971	April 30, 1982	10 years, 241 days	
7		Karen N. Horn	1944–	May 1, 1982	April 8, 1987	4 years, 364 days	
8		W. Lee Hoskins		October 8, 1987	November 15, 1991	4 years, 38 days	
9		Jerry L. Jordan	1941-	March 10, 1992	January 31, 2003	10 years, 327 days	
10		Sandra Pianalto	1954-	February 1, 2003	May 31, 2014	11 years, 119 days	
11		Loretta J. Mester	1958–	June 1, 2014	June 30, 2024	10 years, 29 days	
12		Beth M. Hammack	1971/1972–	August 21, 2024	Incumbent	2 years, 87 days	

†	Stepped down due to reaching retirement age
*	Died in office

== See also ==
- Federal Reserve Act
- Federal Reserve Bank of Cleveland Cincinnati Branch Office
- Federal Reserve Bank of Cleveland Pittsburgh Branch Office
- Federal Reserve System
- Federal Reserve Districts
- Federal Reserve Branches
- Structure of the Federal Reserve System
