= Jerry Jordan =

American economist

President of the Federal Reserve Bank of Cleveland
- In office March 10, 1992 – January 31, 2003
- Preceded by: W. Lee Hoskins
- Succeeded by: Sandra Pianalto

Personal details
- Born: November 12, 1941 (age 84)
- Education: California State University, Northridge (BA); University of California, Los Angeles (MA, PhD)

Jerry L. Jordan (born November 12, 1941) is a former member of President Ronald Reagan's Council of Economic Advisers and former president and chief executive officer of the Federal Reserve Bank of Cleveland.

== Career ==
Jordan attended California State University, Northridge, where he earned a B.A. in economics (1963). He continued his education at the University of California at Los Angeles, where he earned his Ph.D. in economics (1969, supervisor: Armen Alchian).

He was employed at the Federal Reserve Bank of St. Louis from 1967 up until 1975, ending with the position as senior vice president and director of research. From 1971 to 1972 he was on assignment as an economic consultant with Deutsche Bundesbank in Frankfurt, Germany. Following his 8-year employment at the Federal Reserve Bank of St. Louis, Jordan was employed as the senior vice president and economist at Pittsburgh National Bank from 1975 to 1980. From July 1980 to March 1981 and August 1982 to January 1985, Jordan held the position as dean and professor at the Robert O. Anderson School of Management located at the University of New Mexico. During the break in his employment at the University of New Mexico, Jordan was a member of President Ronald Reagan's Council of Economic Advisers from April 1981 to July 1982. After his stay at the University of New Mexico, he attained employment as the senior vice president and chief economist at First Interstate Bancorp from 1985 to 1992. In 1992 Jordan returned to work at the Federal Reserve, but this time at the Federal Reserve Bank of Cleveland, where he was the president and chief executive officer until 2003.

Jordan is currently the president of the Pacific Academy for Advanced Studies, a member of the board of trustees of the Foundation for Research in Economics and Education, and a senior fellow of the Fraser Institute, and an adjunct scholar of the Cato Institute.

== Education ==
- Bachelor of Arts in economics (1963) – California State University, Northridge
- Doctor of Philosophy in economics (1969) – University of California, Los Angeles

== Previous positions ==
- March 1992 – February 2003, president and chief executive officer at the Federal Reserve Bank of Cleveland
- February 1985 – March 1992, senior vice president and chief economist at First Interstate Bancorp
- August 1982 – January 1985 and July 1980–March 1981, dean and professor at the R.O. Anderson School of Management, University of New Mexico
- April 1981 – July 1982, member, President Reagan's Council of Economic Advisers
- October 1975 – June 1980, senior vice president and economist at Pittsburgh National Bank
- August 1967 – September 1975, senior vice president and director of research (last position) at the Federal Reserve Bank of St. Louis
- November 1971 – May 1972, economic consultant at Deutsche Bundesbank, Frankfurt, W. Germany

== Other professional activities ==
- Visiting scholar at Fraser Institute, Vancouver, BC, 2004
- Honorary doctorate, Universidad Francisco Marroquin, Guatemala, November 2013
- Honorary Doctor of Business at Capital University, Columbus, Ohio (2001)
- Honorary Doctor of Economics at Denison University, Granville, Ohio (1997)
- Academic Advisory Council at The Institute of Economic Affairs, London, England (1997–present)
- Business Advisory Board, Reason Foundation
- Mont Pelerin Society (1988–present)
- Shadow Open Market Committee (1975–1980 and 1982–1992)
- Consultant, Board of Governors of the Federal Reserve System
- U.S. Gold Commission (1981–1982)
- Board of directors, National Association of Business Economists (1978–1980 and 1985–88) (president, 1986–1987)
- Executive committee, Western Economic Association (1983–1986)
- Board of trustees, Reason Foundation (1986–1988)
- Board of directors, Technological Innovation Center, UNM (1980, 1982–1984)
- Director, New Mexico School of Banking (1980, 1982–1984)
- Economic Advisory Committee, American Bankers Association (1978–1980)
- Adjunct professor, Carnegie Mellon University (1978–1979)
- Adjunct scholar, Cato Institute
- Senior fellow, Atlas Network

Other offices
| Preceded by W. Lee Hoskins | President of the Federal Reserve Bank of Cleveland; 1992–2003 | Succeeded by Sandra Pianalto |
