= Anil Kashyap =

American economist

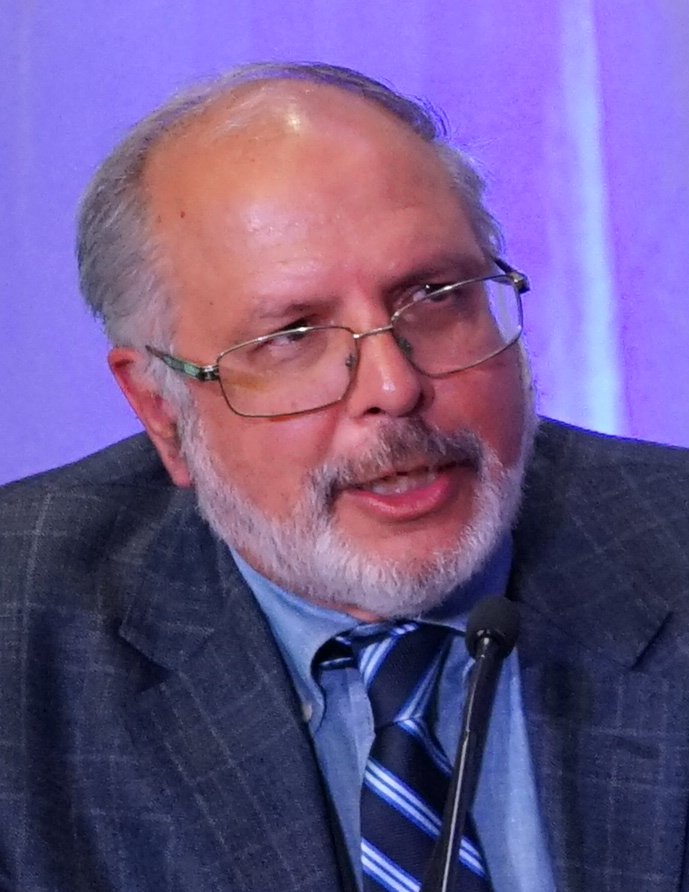
- Kashyap at ASSA 2026

Academic background
- Education: Massachusetts Institute of Technology; University of California at Davis
- Doctoral advisor: Olivier Blanchard

Academic work
- Institutions: University of Chicago Booth School of Business
- Website: Information at IDEAS / RePEc

Anil K Kashyap, CBE (born 1960) is the Stevens Distinguished Service Professor of Economics and Finance at the University of Chicago's Booth School of Business. Kashyap's research focuses on price setting, the Japanese economy, monetary policy, financial intermediation and regulation. As an author, he is held in libraries worldwide.

== Early life ==
Kashyap was born in Fremont, California in 1960. He graduated from Mission San Jose High School in 1978 and attended the University of California at Davis. He graduated from Davis in 1982 with highest honors, being elected to Phi Beta Kappa in 1981. He majored in Economics and Statistics.

=== Federal Reserve ===
Kashyap worked as a research assistant at the Federal Reserve Board of Governors from 1982 until 1984. After finishing graduate school, he returned and worked as a staff economist from 1988 until 1991. In both spells he worked in the Research and Statistics division in the section of that maintained the staff large scale econometric model.

=== MIT ===
Kashyap was a graduate student at the Massachusetts Institute of Technology in the Department of Economics from 1984 to 1989. He worked as a teaching assistant for Rudiger Dornbusch and Stanley Fischer. The chair of his dissertation committee was Olivier Blanchard; Fischer and James Poterba were the other advisors. While at MIT, he was introduced to a number of students with whom he would eventually collaborate, including Ricardo Caballero, Takeo Hoshi, Gary Loveman, Raghuram Rajan, David Scharfstein, Jeremy Stein and David Wilcox.

=== The University of Chicago ===
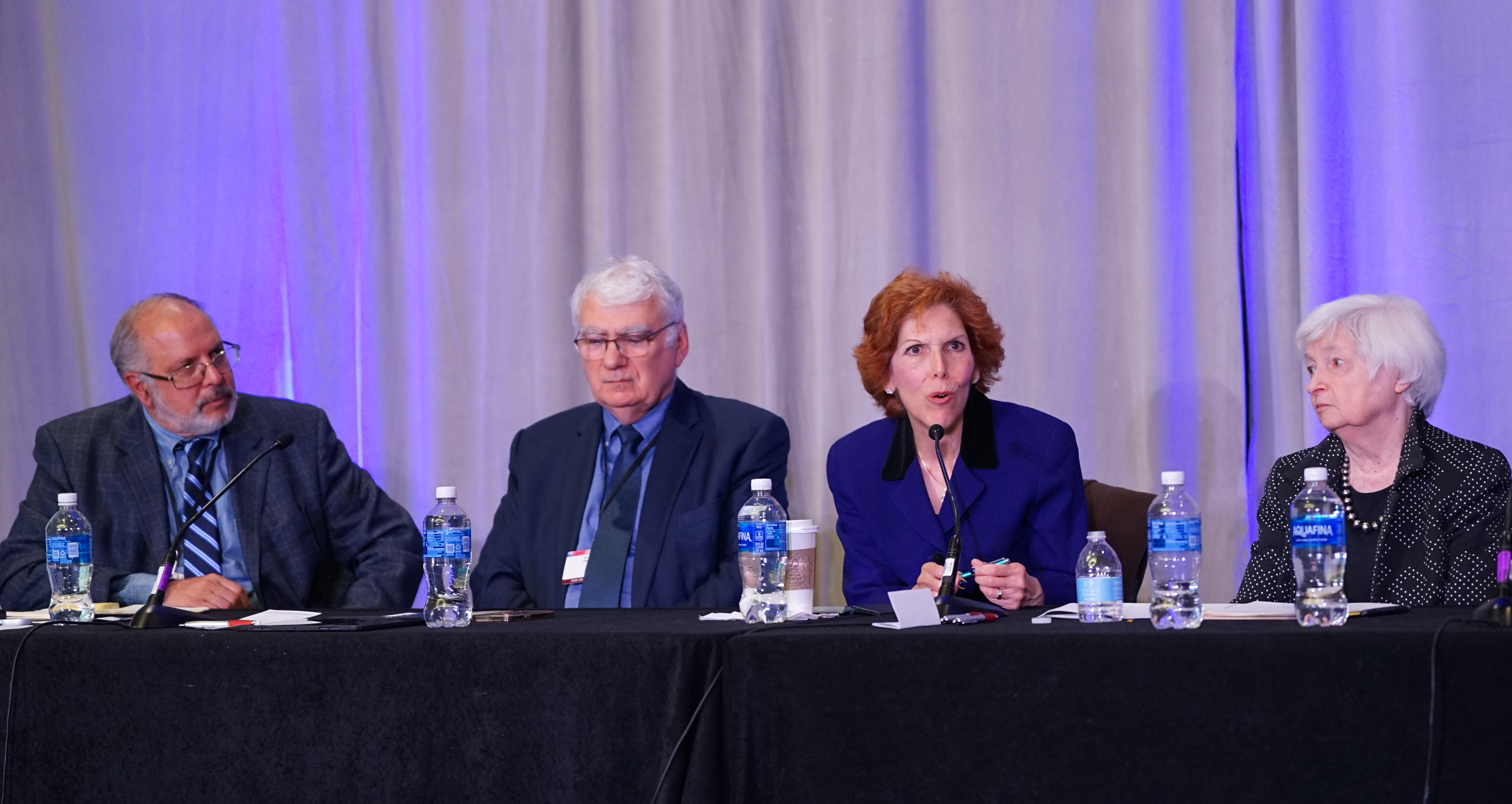
Kashyap, Athanasios Orphanides, Loretta Mester, Janet Yellen at ASSA 2026

Kashyap moved to the business school (then the Graduate School of Business, now the Booth School of Business) at Chicago in 1991 and was promoted to Associate Professor (1993) and full Professor (1996), before being appointed as the Edward Eagle Brown Professor in 2003 (and subsequently becoming the inaugural holder of the Stevens chair in 2020). While at Booth he has taught MBA courses on Money and Banking, the Japanese Economy, Developing a Business Strategy for Japan, Understanding Central Banks, Analyzing Financial Crises and most recently Advanced Macroeconomics. He has won the school-wide teaching award voted by the MBA students and the Dean's prize for exceptional service.

Kashyap was one of the founding directors of the Chicago Booth Initiative on Global Markets (IGM). The Chicago Booth Kent A. Clark Center for Global Markets was named in April 2023. As part of the IGM activities he helped create the IGM Economic Experts Panel. This panel includes leading economists from Berkeley, Chicago, Harvard, MIT, Princeton, Stanford and Yale who answer periodic public policy questions. Others have analyzed the responses to these questions to determine issues on which economists agree with each other. The public can also answer questions to see which panelists’ opinions are most similar to their own.

Under the auspices of the IGM, he also co-founded the US Monetary Policy Forum. This conference has become one of the leading conferences regarding monetary policy in the world.

He has served as co-editor of the Journal of Business and the Journal of Political Economy.

== Research ==
His PhD dissertation included one of the first papers to analyze firm-level transactions prices. Using data from mail order retailers he studied the way prices are set finding that they change about once a year, the size of price change is very irregular for a given item, the last digit of the price influences the probability that the price will change and the same item often will have some periods when the price may be constant for more than a year and at other times may change by only one or two percent. These findings contradict the predictions of the simplest “menu cost” pricing models that suppose that prices are only changed when the benefit of doing so exceeds a fixed given cost of changing them (because the presence of both small changes and long period of no changes imply that sometime this cost must be small and other times must be larger.) They have subsequently been confirmed in numerous other studies using larger data sets from other time periods and other countries.

His dissertation also included research with Takeo Hoshi and David Scharfstein that was among the first to use the unique institutional features of the Japanese economy to test a number of theories about financial markets. They observed that groups of firms in Japan that are members of the same keiretsu coordinate some activities, most notably sharing funding from a group bank implying that the banking relationships within these groups help overcome problems that are present in more arms-length funding arrangements.

One example would be providing assistance to firms that are temporarily distressed. Normally, firms with transient low profitability would not be able to convince a lender to forbear on upcoming payments because the lender might fear that doing so would only allow other creditors to be repaid and the lender may never recover its funds if the borrower's fortunes do not improve. Within groups, however, the banks have incentives to take a long-term view and to assist the borrower, recognizing that when the borrower recovers they can recoup their assistance. Hoshi, Kashyap and Scharfstein found that this pattern was present empirically: group-affiliated firms were able to invest and sell more when they were in trouble than unaffiliated firms.

A second example is the prediction that many firms might have trouble obtaining funding because lenders could not fully judge their investment prospects and ability to repay. These borrowing constraints could force firms to grow more slowly than otherwise if these information problems were not present. Within a group these problems should be less of an issue because of the repeated interactions and other information sharing arrangements practiced by the groups. Hoshi, Kashyap and Scharfstein tested this prediction by examining whether the keiretsu banks supported the keiretsu firms by allowing them to invest irrespective of whether the firms had cash-on-hand to pay for the investment. They found that the investment of the group firms was less sensitive to the resources inside these firms compared to similar firms that were not group members.

This pair of papers not only provided early evidence in favor of theories that emphasized the importance of information problems in hampering the performance of firms, but also spurred other economists to look for institutional arrangements that might provide novel ways to test these theories.

Around the time that these papers were published, Japan deregulated its financial system and that changed the way the keiretsu operated. Hoshi and Kashyap went on to continue studying the evolution of the Japanese financial system in the wake of the deregulation. They wrote on the history of the Japanese financial system—one of the first papers on the Japanese banking crisis, and winner of the 45th Nikkei Prize for Excellent Books in Economic Science. Later, with Ricardo Caballero, they popularized the idea that the ongoing financial problems were creating "zombie firms.". Their notion of a zombie is a firm that was insolvent or virtually so, but was protected from bankruptcy because their banks were hesitant to foreclose upon them for fear of having to recognize the losses. These weak banks would engage in sham loan restructurings to present the appearance that the firms were viable, hoping that the firms might eventually recover. Caballero, Hoshi and Kashyap find that the presence of the zombie firms contributed to the slow growth in Japan after the 1997 Asian financial crisis.

Just after finishing graduate school, Kashyap and Jeremy Stein began a long collaboration that examined the role of banks in transmission of monetary policy. They explored whether central bank open-market operations have special effects because the central bank's counterparties were banks who require central bank reserves to operate. In traditional analyses, monetary operations that change reserves matter because they affect the amount of deposits that banks can offer and because deposits are a form of money, this changes the volume of transactions in the economy. Kashyap and Stein noted that reserve changes also have implications for the other side of the banks’ balance sheet. They investigated whether the expansion in loans that comes when bank reserves increase, which they dubbed the “bank lending channel,” had a separate effect on the economy. They first tested this conjecture using aggregate U.S. data in a paper with David Wilcox and found that when the Federal Reserve tightened policy, bank lending fell and the lending reduction caused a drop in spending. Subsequently, Kashyap and Stein used bank level data to show that lending by banks that were more dependent on central bank funding was more responsive to central bank policy.

Kashyap and Stein then collaborated with Raghuram Rajan on two noteworthy papers on financial intermediation. The first, winner of the 2002 Brattle Distinguished Paper Prize and published in the Journal of Finance, proposed a theory for why banks have debt which is demandable and loans which are longer term. They conjectured that there is a synergy between offering sight deposits (aka checking accounts, or demandable debt) and loan commitments (the antecedents to loans). Both checking accounts and loan commitments require the institution offering them to have a pool of liquidity. The liquidity can be used to honor a deposit withdrawal or the takedown of a commitment (after which it is converted into a loan). The link between these two goes back all the way to medieval money changers; Kashyap et al. presented empirical evidence showing that banks which had more loan commitments tended to also have more checking accounts, and they showed why this is optimal for imperfectly correlated withdrawals and commitment takedowns because of the cost savings from accommodating both with a common pool of liquidity.

These authors subsequently proposed a debt contract that would convert into equity when a bank is distressed. This suggestion was dubbed by the New York Times as one of the best ideas of 2008, although other variants of this suggestion existed before their paper. Banks that have issued these kinds of securities, commonly called contingent, convertible securities (CoCos) have been allowed to count them towards capital requirements after the 2008 financial crisis.

== Popular writings ==
Kashyap, Rajan, and Stein joined the Squam Lake Group, along with David Scharfstein, Douglas Diamond, Hyun Song Shin (the latter two are also co-authors with Kashyap) and a number of other distinguished scholars. This group of "...fifteen of the world's leading economists--representing the broadest spectrum of economic opinion" wrote a number of policy memos detailing how financial regulation after the 2008 financial crisis should be amended. Their book that compiled and extended the recommendations was widely acclaimed.

Kashyap also has written several op-eds and blog posts since the beginning of the 2008 financial crisis that have been prescient or recognized as offering excellent contemporaneous summaries of current events. Kashyap and Shin, shortly after the collapse of Bear Stearns, called for a mandate that banks suspend dividends in a Financial Times comment. Subsequent analysis has indicated that if banks had been held to this standard their capital positions would have been much stronger. Kashyap, writing also in the Financial Times, was one of the first proponents to argue that banks should be required to file “living wills” that describe how they could be closed without cost to the taxpayer. Globally systemically important financial institutions are now required to file such documents. Diamond and Kashyap wrote a blog post] for the New York Times the day after the Lehman Brothers bankruptcy that was one of the most widely read descriptions of the bankruptcy and its aftermath. Kashyap wrote a primer on the Greek government-debt crisis that continues to be widely read.

== External awards and activities ==
Kashyap's research has won him numerous awards. In December 2017 he was awarded the Order of the Rising Sun 3rd class Gold Rays with Neck Ribbon "for playing a vital role in promoting and disseminating high-quality research on the Japanese financial system and Japan's economic policies" as well as bringing together Japanese and American economic researchers. Other awards include a Sloan Research Fellowship, the Nikkei Prize for Excellent Books in Economic Sciences, and a Senior Houblon-Norman Fellowship from the Bank of England (twice). He was appointed to the National Bureau of Economic Research (NBER) as a faculty research fellow in 1993 and as a research associate in 1996. On behalf of the NBER he founded the Japan Project Meeting that is a prominent conference organized around the Japanese economy. He was elected to the American Economic Association Executive Committee and on behalf of the AEA has served on and chaired several committees.

Kashyap has also held a number of advisory or consulting positions with public sector organizations. These appointments include assignments at the Federal Reserve Banks of Chicago and New York, the Congressional Budget Office, the International Monetary Fund, the Office of Financial Research, the European Central Bank, and Central Banks of Finland and Sweden, the Japanese External Trade Organization, and the Economic and Social Research Institute of Japanese Cabinet Office. He served on the board of directors of the Bank of Italy's Einuadi Institute of Economics and Finance and is a member of the Squam Lake Group. He has been a Research Fellow for the Centre for Economic Policy Research since 2017.

On September 1, 2016, Kashyap was appointed to the Bank of England's Financial Policy Committee for a term of three years beginning October 1, 2016, and reappointed in 2019.

== Personal ==
His parents are Tapeshwar Singh Kashyap and Janice M. Thien (née Moehnke), both deceased. Like Harry S Truman, Kashyap's full middle name is the letter K. He has one brother Ajay (Jay) Kashyap. He was married to Katherine Ann Merrell (from 1989 to 2020) and they raised two children Laurie Ann Merrell and Julie Elizabeth Merrell. The latter child is known to have Coeliac disease Coeliac Disease. He is a long-time season ticket holder of the Chicago Cubs and the Indianapolis 500.

In 2023 he was made an Honorary Commander of the Order of the British Empire (CBE) from British Government for services to the economy.
