= Price fixing =

Anticompetitive agreement to control prices

Price fixing is an anticompetitive agreement between participants on the same side in a market to buy or sell a product, service, or commodity only at a fixed price, or maintain the market conditions such that the price is maintained at a given level by controlling supply and demand.

The intent of price fixing may be to push the price of a product as high as possible, generally leading to profits for all sellers but may also have the goal to fix, peg, discount, or stabilize prices. The defining characteristic of price fixing is any agreement regarding price, whether expressed or implied.

Price fixing requires a conspiracy between sellers or buyers. The purpose is to coordinate pricing for mutual benefit of the traders. For example, manufacturers and retailers may conspire to sell at a common "retail" price; set a common minimum sales price, where sellers agree not to discount the sales price below the agreed-to minimum price; buy the product from a supplier at a specified maximum price; adhere to a price book or list price; engage in cooperative price advertising; standardize financial credit terms offered to purchasers; use uniform trade-in allowances; limit discounts; discontinue a free service or fix the price of one component of an overall service; adhere uniformly to previously announced prices and terms of sale; establish uniform costs and markups; impose mandatory surcharges; purposefully reduce output or sales in order to charge higher prices; or purposefully share or pool markets, territories, or customers.

Price fixing is permitted in some markets but not others; where allowed, it is often known as resale price maintenance or retail price maintenance.

Not all similar prices or price changes at the same time are price fixing. These situations are often normal market phenomena. For example, the price of agricultural products such as wheat basically do not differ too much, because such agricultural products have no characteristics and are essentially the same, and their price will only change slightly at the same time. If a natural disaster occurs, the price of all affected wheat will rise at the same time. And the increase in consumer demand may also cause the prices of products with limited supply to rise at the same time.

In neo-classical economics, price fixing is inefficient. The anti-competitive agreement by producers to fix prices above the market price transfers some of the consumer surplus to those producers and also results in a deadweight loss.

International price fixing by private entities can be prosecuted under the antitrust laws of many countries. Examples of prosecuted international cartels are those that controlled the prices and output of lysine, citric acid, graphite electrodes, and bulk vitamins.

== Legal status ==
=== United States ===
In the United States, price fixing can be prosecuted as a criminal federal offense under Section 1 of the Sherman Antitrust Act.

Criminal prosecutions must be handled by the U.S. Department of Justice, but the Federal Trade Commission also has jurisdiction for civil antitrust violations. Many state attorneys general also bring antitrust cases and have antitrust offices, such as Virginia, New York, and California. Further, where price fixing is used as an artifice to defraud a U.S. government agency into paying more than market value, the U.S. attorney may proceed under the False Claims Act.

Private individuals or organizations may file lawsuits for triple damages for antitrust violations and, depending on the law, recover attorneys fees and costs expended on prosecution of a case. If the case at hand also violates the False Claims Act of 1863, in addition to the Sherman Act, private individuals may also bring a civil action in the name of the United States under the Qui Tam provision of The False Claims Act.

Under American law, exchanging prices among competitors can also violate the antitrust laws. That includes exchanging prices with the intent to fix prices or the exchange affecting the prices individual competitors set. Proof that competitors have shared prices can be used as part of the evidence of an illegal price fixing agreement. Experts generally advise that competitors avoid even the appearance of agreeing on price.

Since 1997, US courts have divided price fixing into two categories: vertical and horizontal maximum price fixing. Vertical price fixing includes a manufacturer's attempt to control the price of its product at retail. In State Oil Co. v. Khan, the U.S. Supreme Court held that vertical price fixing is no longer considered a per se violation of the Sherman Act, but horizontal price fixing is still considered a breach of the Sherman Act. Also in 2008, the defendants of United States v LG Display Co., United States v. Chunghwa Picture Tubes, and United States v. Sharp Corporation, heard in the United States District Court for the Northern District of California, agreed to pay a total sum of $585 million to settle their prosecutions for conspiring to fix prices of liquid crystal display panels. That was the second largest amount awarded under the Sherman Act in history.

=== Canada ===
In Canada, it is an indictable criminal offence under Section 45 of the Competition Act. Bid rigging is considered a form of price fixing and is illegal in Canada (s.47 Competition Act).

=== Australia ===
Price fixing is illegal in Australia under the Competition and Consumer Act 2010, with considerably similar prohibitions to the US and Canadian prohibitions. The Act is administered and enforced by the Australian Competition & Consumer Commission. Section 48 of the Competition and Consumer Act 2010 (Cth) explicitly states, "A corporation shall not engage in the practise of resale price maintenance." A broader understanding of the statutory provision is in Section 96(3)of the Competition and Consumer Act 2010 (Cth), which broadly defines what can be resale price maintenance.

=== New Zealand ===
New Zealand law prohibits price fixing, among most other anti-competitive behaviours under the Commerce Act 1986. The act covers practices similar to that of US and Canadian law, and it is enforced by the Commerce Commission.

=== European Union ===
Under the EU commission's leniency programme, whistleblowing firms that co-operate with the antitrust authority see their prospective penalties either wiped out or reduced.

=== United Kingdom ===
British competition law prohibits almost any attempt to fix prices.

The Net Book Agreement was a public agreement between UK booksellers from 1900 to 1991 to sell new books only at the recommended retail price to protect the revenues of smaller bookshops. The agreement collapsed in 1991, when the large book chain Dillons began discounting books, followed by rival Waterstones.

However, price-fixing is still legal in the magazine and newspaper distribution industry, and sometimes in the motion picture industry. Retailers who sell at below cover price are subject to withdrawal of supply. The Office of Fair Trading has given its approval to the status quo.

== Exemptions ==
When the agreement to control price is sanctioned by a multilateral treaty or is entered by sovereign nations as opposed to individual firms, the cartel may be protected from lawsuits and criminal antitrust prosecution. That is why OPEC, the global petroleum cartel, has not been prosecuted or successfully sued under US antitrust law.

International airline tickets have their prices fixed by agreement with the IATA, a practice for which there is a specific exemption in antitrust law.

== Examples ==
=== Compact discs ===
Between 1995 and 2000, music companies were found to have used illegal marketing agreements such as minimum advertised pricing to artificially inflate prices of compact discs in order to end price wars by discounters such as Best Buy and Target in the early 1990s. It is estimated customers were overcharged by nearly $500 million and up to $5 per album. A settlement in 2002 included the music publishers and distributors; Sony Music, Warner Music, Bertelsmann Music Group, EMI Music, Universal Music as well as retailers Musicland, Trans World Entertainment and Tower Records. In restitution for price fixing they agreed to pay a $67.4 million fine and distribute $75.7 million in CDs to public and non-profit groups.

=== Dynamic random access memory (DRAM) ===
In October 2005, the Korean company Samsung pleaded guilty to conspiring with other companies, including Infineon and Hynix Semiconductor, to fix the price of dynamic random access memory (DRAM) chips. Samsung was the third company to be charged in connection with the international cartel and was fined $300 million, the second largest antitrust penalty in US history.

In October 2004, four executives from Infineon, a German chip maker, received reduced sentences of 4 to 6 months in federal prison and $250,000 in fines after agreeing to aid the U.S. Department of Justice with their ongoing investigation of the conspiracy.

=== Capacitors ===
In March 2018, the European Commission fined eight firms, mostly Japanese companies, €254 million for operating an illegal price cartel for capacitors. The two largest players were Nippon Chemi-Con which was fined €98 million and Hitachi Chemical which was fined €18 million.

=== Perfume ===
In 2006, the government of France fined 13 perfume brands and three vendors for price collusion between 1997 and 2000. The brands include L'Oréal (€4.1 million), Chanel (€3.0 million), LVMH's Sephora (€9.4 million), and Hutchison Whampoa's Marionnaud (€12.8 million).

=== Liquid crystal displays ===
In 2008 in the US, LG Display Co., Chunghwa Picture Tubes and Sharp Corp., agreed to plead guilty and pay $585 million in criminal fines for conspiring to fix prices of liquid crystal display panels.

South Korea–based LG Display would pay $400 million, the second-highest criminal fine that the US Justice Department antitrust division has ever imposed. Chunghwa would pay $65 million for conspiring with LG Display and other unnamed companies and Sharp would pay $120 million, according to the department.

In 2010, the EU fined LG Display €215 million for its part in the LCD price fixing scheme. Other companies were fined for a combined total of €648.9 million, including Chimei Innolux, AU Optronics, Chunghwa Picture Tubes Ltd., and HannStar Display Corp. LG Display said it is considering appealing the fine.

=== Air cargo market ===
In late 2005/early 2006, Lufthansa and Virgin Atlantic came forward about their involvement in large price-fixing schemes for cargo and passenger surcharges in which 21 airlines were involved since 2000 (amongst which were British Airways, Korean Air, and Air France-KLM). U.S. Department of Justice fined the airlines a total of $1.7 billion, charged 19 executives with wrongdoing and four received prison terms.

In December 2008, the New Zealand Commerce Commission filed legal proceedings against 13 airlines in the New Zealand High Court. According to the Commission, the carriers "colluded to raise the price of [freight] by imposing fuel charges for more than seven years". In 2013 Air New Zealand was the final airline of the 13 to settle.

The Commission noted that it might involve up to 60 airlines. In 2009 the Commission said overseas competition authorities were also investigating the air cargo market, including the US and Australia where fines had been imposed.

=== Tuna ===
An attempt to fix the price of tuna resulted in a $25 million fine for Bumble Bee Foods in 2017 and a $100 million fine for StarKist in 2020. Christopher Lischewski, the former CEO of Bumble Bee, was sentenced to 40 months in jail and fined $100,000 for his 2010–2013 involvement.

=== Coronavirus vaccine ===
During the COVID-19 pandemic, companies such as Pfizer and Moderna announced rates for their coronavirus vaccines that would differ based on deals established with various governments. Executive orders were enacted in the United States to lower prescription drug costs which was claimed by Pfizer's CEO to cause "enormous destruction" to the pharmaceutical industry.

=== 1990s airlines ===
Airlines in the 1990's were blocked by the US Department of Justice from continuing to use software to share data on routes and prices before they became public.

=== Rent algorithm ===
ProPublica in 2022 investigated the use of algorithms created by RealPage by rental companies across the United States to set rents, which critics worry has helped to raise rents by limiting competition. The US DOJ escalated its investigation into price-fixing in March of 2024, and filed an anti-trust lawsuit in August of 2024.

=== Online advertising ===
According to the group of 15 state attorneys general suing Google for antitrust issues, Google and Facebook entered into a price-fixing agreement termed Jedi Blue to monopolize the online advertising market and prevent the entry of the fairer header bidding method of advertisement sales on any major advertising platform. The agreement consisted of Facebook using the Google-managed system for bidding on and managing online ads in exchange for preferential rates and priority on prime ad placement. This allowed Google to retain its profitable monopoly over online ad exchanges, while saving Facebook billions of dollars on attempts to build competing systems. Over 200 newspapers have sued Google and Facebook to recover losses incurred by the collusion. Google admitted that the deal contained, "a provision governing cooperation between Google and Facebook in the event of certain government investigations." Google has an internal team called gTrade dedicated to maximizing Google's advertising profits, reportedly using insider information, price fixing, and leveraging Google's relative monopoly positions.

== Signs of possible price fixing during bidding ==
It is more common to have price fixing trends during the bidding process, such as:

- If the bid or quoted price is much higher than expected, the reason may be collusive to set the price or just overpriced, but it is legal in itself.
- If all suppliers choose to increase prices at the same time, it is beyond the scope of input cost changes.
- If the price of a new supplier is lower than the usual corporate bidding price, the reason may be that there is a collusion of bidding among existing companies.
- If the price of a new supplier drops significantly after bidding, the reason may be that some suppliers have been colluding and the new supplier has forced them to compete.

== Impact of price fixing ==
When prices are determined between various companies, it may affect consumers' choices to a certain extent, and affect small businesses that rely on these suppliers.

Taking freight as an example, many products are now transported by freight through various channels. If the freight price is artificially increased, it will have an impact on the entire supply chain. For example, it will cause the price of goods and services to increase, and it will also affect consumers' choices.

== Criticism on legislation ==
Economic liberals believe that price fixing is a voluntary and consensual activity between parties that should be free from government compulsion and government interference. At times price fixing ensures a stable market for both consumers and producers. Any short-term benefit of increased price competition will force some producers out of the market and cause product shortages and prices for consumers to rise. In the end price-fixing legislation forces producers out of a market because it can not compete with the biggest discounter and the market winds up a monopoly anyway.

== See also ==
- Antitrust
- Bid rigging
- Collusion
- George Howard Earle Jr.
- FBI
- Fixed price
- Gold fixing
- Herfindahl index
- London Gold Pool
- Monopoly
- Oligopoly
- Price controls
- Price fixing cases
- Price gouging
- Resale price maintenance
- Tacit collusion
- Trade Practices Act 1974 (Australia)
- US Department of Justice
- Variable pricing
- Vendor lock-in
