= Zonal (company) =

Scottish point of sale service company

Zonal Retail Data Systems Ltd.
- Type: Limited company
- Founded: 1979
- Headquarters: Edinburgh, Scotland, UK
- Products: EPoS systems
- Website: www.zonal.co.uk

Zonal is a software company that provides EPoS (electronic point of sale) systems and integrated front-and back-of-house technology solutions to hospitality and leisure businesses based in Edinburgh, Scotland. It was founded in 1979 and as of 2024 employs over 700 people.

== History ==
The concept for Zonal began in 1979, when their founder, the late Ralph McLean, needed to control operations at his family business in Edinburgh. After noticing that the bar staff were giving away drinks, and that takings were going missing from the cash register, McLean built the first hospitality electronic till.

On 12 October 1979, the Zonal company was officially formed, and was registered at Companies House as Zonal Retail Data Systems.

Zonal’s first hardware combined a Nascom home computer board with their own designed memory board, an early EPoS system that was admired and adopted by numerous Edinburgh pubs. In 1980 Zonal then launched the LT80 till, and a year later sold the family hotel and moved to Forth Street, Edinburgh into what became not only the family home, but also Zonal’s head office for the next few years. Ralph’s sons, Stuart McLean and Howard McLean, were employed as engineers.

1984 saw the launch of ZIMS (Zonal Information Management System) software, which managed cash, stock, employee hours and payroll, all via the till. In the same year, James McLean joined his brothers and became employed by the company as a field engineer.

In 1992, Zonal bought offices in Rugby and launched its second POS terminal, the 90S, which was housed in one metal case. One year later the company expanded into the USA, opening offices in Orlando, and also launched PRIZM, its next generation of software. PRIZM allowed each site to store and share information without the need for a 3.5” floppy disk, introducing the concept of a back office PC which allowed the moving of management functions away from the till. In 1994, the 9001 EPoS terminal, which has a larger touch panel, was launched.

In 1997, Ralph McLean’s son Stuart McLean became Managing Director at Zonal.

In 2003, Zonal first launched Aztec, the EPoS management system still used today.

In 2005, Zonal opened offices in Milton Park.

In 2010, Zonal acquired online ordering company Freshnet.

In 2013, Zonal further added to its portfolio with the acquisition of digital marketing agency, TXD. Mitchells & Butlers installed Zonal across their estate. Zonal launched its handheld product, iServe, to turn Apple devices into portable tills.

In 2014, Zonal marked their 35th anniversary by relocating to their new head office in Tanfield, Edinburgh. The company was also awarded Scottish Family Business of The Year, and won The Herald Business Innovation Award.

In 2016 Zonal won Best B2B Technology Product/Service category at the Digital Technology Awards for its app-based mobile ordering system. Zonal also acquired online booking platform liveRES, as well as the majority stake in property management system, High Level Software. High Level Software rebranded to Zonal Hotel Solutions in 2024.

In 2018, Zonal acquired EPoS company Comtrex, and won Best EPoS Brand in Restaurant Magazine’s Readers’ Choice awards. The company won this award again in 2019.

In 2022, Zonal became a WIRED Trailblazer, and in October the same year, purchased CRM and digital loyalty company Airship. In December, Zonal won Scottish Family Business of the Year (Large)] at The Herald Family Business Awards.

In 2024, Zonal wins double at the Restaurant Readers' Choice Awards winning Best EPoS and Best Technology categories.

In February 2026, the company announced that it was being acquired by Volaris Group. The terms of the deal were not disclosed.
