= Ann Womer Benjamin =

American politician

- Education: Vanderbilt University (B.S); Case Western Reserve University Law School
- Occupation: Politician

Ann Womer Benjamin is the mayor of Aurora, Ohio, a position she has held since 2014. She is former executive director of the Northeast Ohio Council on Higher Education. Womer Benjamin served in the cabinet of the former Governor of Ohio Bob Taft as director of the Ohio Department of Insurance. Prior to that appointment, she was a member of the Ohio House of Representatives in 1995–2002. She represented a district which encompassed Portage County.

== Biography ==
Womer Benjamin received her bachelor's degree from Vanderbilt University in 1975 magna cum laude and was a member of Phi Beta Kappa, and graduated from Case Western Reserve University Law School in 1978. She practiced law with Black McCuskey Souers and Arbaugh in Canton, Ohio and then with the former national law firm of Arter and Hadden in Cleveland, Ohio.

She served four terms in the Ohio House of Representatives from 1995 to 2002. During her term, she sponsored bills on student loans, crime victims' reparations, rape, finance reform, trust law, and welfare reform.

In 1994 Womer Benjamin beat a long-time incumbent to win a seat in the Ohio House of Representatives where she served for eight years representing most of Portage County, Ohio (75th District). In 2002, she ran for the House of Representatives for Ohio's 17th district as a Republican, but lost to Democratic state Senator Tim Ryan. Womer Benjamin was appointed the first female Director of the Ohio Department of Insurance by Governor Bob Taft in January 2003. In 2007, she was appointed by Governor Taft to the Ohio State Board of Education and was named executive director of the Northeast Ohio Council on Higher Education. In 2011, she was elected to the Aurora City Council and in 2012 appointed to the Ohio Tuition Trust Authority by Governor John Kasich.

In 2013, Womer Benjamin announced her bid for mayor of Aurora, Ohio. She won the position in a six-way race with 34.58 percent of the vote and has been re-elected twice. She became the third woman mayor of Aurora, Ohio.

Governor Mike DeWine appointed Womer Benjamin to the Kent State Board of Trustees in 2019. She also serves on the board of the National First Ladies Library.

== See also ==
- Ohio's 17th congressional district
