= W. Braddock Hickman =

American businessman

Braddock Hickman

President of the Federal Reserve Bank of Cleveland
- In office May 1, 1963 – November 28, 1970
- Preceded by: Wilbur Fulton
- Succeeded by: Willis Winn

Personal details
- Born: Walter Braddock Hickman; April 11, 1911 Baltimore, Maryland, U.S.
- Died: November 28, 1970 (aged 59) Cleveland, Ohio, U.S.
- Education: University of Richmond (BA); Johns Hopkins University (MA, PhD)

Walter Braddock Hickman (April 11, 1911 – November 28, 1970) was President of the Federal Reserve Bank of Cleveland from May 1, 1963, to November 28, 1970 (died in office).

== Biography ==
A native of Baltimore, Maryland, Hickman graduated from the University of Richmond and earned his Ph.D. in economics from Johns Hopkins University in 1937. He was a member of the faculties of Princeton University, Rutgers University, and the Institute for Advanced Study. During World War II, he was a lieutenant in the U.S. Naval Reserve.

Hickman became a member of the research staff and director of the Corporate Bond Research Project of the National Bureau of Economic Research and published three books on corporate finance. Hickman conducted some of the earliest and most complete studies of credit risk in corporate bond markets, most notably his 1958 book, Corporate bond quality investor experience. These credit studies have been credited by Michael Milken for sparking his theories on junk bonds in the 1970s.

Hickman was supervisor of economic studies at the New York Life Insurance Company from 1953 to 1956, joining American Airlines as director of economic research in 1956. He was appointed senior vice president of the Federal Reserve Bank of Cleveland in 1960 and was named president in 1963. Hickman, who always retained a close interest in economic research, was appointed by U.S. President Richard Nixon to the National Commission on Federal Statistics in 1970.

== Selected publications ==
- Braddock Hickman, W (1950). "The Determinacy of Absolute Prices in Classical Economic Theory". Econometrica. 18 (1). The Econometric Society: 9–20. doi:10.2307/1907208. JSTOR 1907208.
- Trends and cycles in corporate bond financing. New York: Ayer Publishing. 1952.
- The volume of corporate bond financing since 1900. New York: Princeton University Press. 1953.
- Corporate bond quality investor experience. New York: Princeton University Press. 1958.

Other offices
Preceded by Wilbur Fulton	President of the Federal Reserve Bank of Cleveland; 1963–1970	Succeeded by Willis Winn
