= SkillSlate =

- Company type: Private
- Website type: Classifieds
- Available in: English
- Founded: 2009
- Headquarters: New York, New York, United States
- Area served: New York City area
- Key people: Bartek Ringwelski (CEO); Brian Rothenberg; Mike Nelson
- Employees: 7
- Website: www.skillslate.com
- Advertising: None
- Registration: Optional
- Launched: 2009
- Current status: Acquired by TaskRabbit

SkillSlate or SkillSlate.com was a New York City-based firm that matched individual service providers with customers via the Internet. The firm raised $1.1 million in capital in October 2010 with investments from Canaan Partners and First Round Capital.

SkillSlate helped small individual service providers, such as dog walkers, DJs, handymen, tutors and movers, market themselves on the web. According to a website description, SkillSlate helps the pages of service providers surface more prominently in search engine results. SkillSlate served the New York metropolitan area. Competitors included Craigslist, Geotoko, FoundTown, Closely, Proposable, Resource Nation, Flowtown, Buzzuka, Spoke, GoBuzz, Traindom, Hooray, Thumbtack, and others, as well as classified advertising in newspapers. According to Fortune Magazine, the idea for the site was conceived by venture capitalist Barkek Ringwelski while working at Canaan Partners when he found he could not find a cleaning person; he raised $50,000 from family and friends in May 2009 and launched the firm.

The company was acquired by TaskRabbit in early 2012.
