= Media Temple =

Web hosting and cloud services provider

Media Temple, Inc.
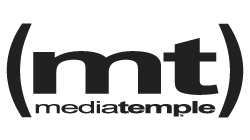
- Type: Subsidiary
- Founded: 1998
- Founder: Thomas Anthony; Demian Sellfors; John Carey
- Defunct: 2023
- Headquarters: Los Angeles, California, United States
- Area served: Worldwide
- Key people: Lou Kikos, General Manager
- Services: Website hosting Cloud hosting
- Number of employees: 200+ (2017)
- Parent: GoDaddy
- Subsidiaries: Virb
- Website: www.mediatemple.net

Media Temple was a website hosting and cloud hosting provider, which focused on web designers, developers and creative agencies. The company was founded in 1998 by Thomas Anthony, Demian Sellfors and John Carey. It was headquartered in Los Angeles, California.

Media Temple was acquired by GoDaddy in October 2013 for total consideration of $94.5 million in cash, but the two brands operated separately until February 2023, when the Media Temple brand was retired and its services were merged into GoDaddy.

== History ==
In 2003, Demian Sellfors became Media Temple CEO. Sellfors founded Intergress Technologies, a digital business service provider in 1998. Intergress Technologies merged with one of its customers, Media Temple, in 1999. The new company maintained the Media Temple name.

Media Temple released the Grid, a public cloud service that manages user websites across multiple clustered servers rather than a single server, in 2006. The Grid was updated in August 2013.

In August 2011, Webtrends acquired Reinvigorate, a portfolio company of Media Temple Ventures, Media Temple's investment arm. Reinvigorate produced web-based real-time data analytics tools.

Media Temple appointed Russell P. Reeder its president and chief operating officer in March 2012. Reeder was president and CEO of LibreDigital prior to RR Donnelley's acquisition of the digital publishing company in 2011. He left Media Temple in April 2015 to join iCitizen, a civic engagement app based in Nashville.

In June 2013, Media Temple launched CloudTech, a 24/7 support service provided by engineers, and upgraded its managed VPS hosting platform.

In October 2013, the Wall Street Journal asked Media Temple to examine the United States Department of Health and Human Services' HealthCare.gov web portal. Media Temple found website code that served no apparent purpose and that the designers of healthcare.gov "failed to follow basic protocols for high-traffic sites."

As part of the GoDaddy acquisition, Media Temple's website-building subsidiary Virb was divested back to founder Brad Smith and Media Temple co-founders Demian Sellfors and John Carey, after the companies concluded that folding the product into GoDaddy's existing website builder did not make business sense.

In March 2014, Media Temple introduced a new managed WordPress hosting product, which the company further expanded in May 2014. In February 2015, Media Temple's managed WordPress offering was reorganized into four pricing tiers.

In December 2014, the web hosting company joined Google for Work Partner Program to resell and support Google Apps for Work.

In July 2015, Media Temple joined the AWS Advanced Consulting Partner Program and launched new managed cloud hosting services for AWS. That same month, Rod Stoddard joined the company as its new president.

In October 2015, the company refreshed its shared hosting product, Grid, and relaunched it as a software-managed solution.

In May 2016, Media Temple introduced a new enterprise-grade WordPress offering powered by Amazon Web Services (AWS).

On December 5, 2022, it was announced that, beginning in February 2023, all Media Temple accounts would become GoDaddy accounts, thus retiring the Media Temple brand.
