= Locu =

Locu was a publishing platform used by restaurants, local merchants, and other companies to create and distribute product and price lists, hours of operation, addresses and other data to Yelp, Foursquare, TripAdvisor, and OpenTable. The company claimed that 30,000 businesses were using the service as of August 2013.

Locu was founded by a group of MIT students in 2011 and raised $600,000 in angel funding. Go Daddy acquired Locu for a reported $70 million in 2013.
