= Price book =

In economics, a price book is a book in which the normal prices of an item are listed for all suppliers. This allows one to determine the lowest price possible.

If a group of suppliers adhere to a particular price book, in other words, they set the prices of the price book artificially higher than the market clearing price, then they are "fixing the price" of that item. This is illegal in most countries and is often found in oligopolies (industries with a few competitors (2-8), but not enough to make it a perfect market).

== Construction industry ==
In construction a price book is used to estimate the cost of work. Historically the Carpenters' Company of the City and County of Philadelphia used their price book to control prices.

== Economic and legal implications ==
In economic analysis, price books can influence market outcomes by increasing price transparency among buyers and sellers. When used legitimately, they may reduce search costs and assist purchasers in comparing suppliers. However, when suppliers collectively adhere to a shared price book that sets prices above competitive levels, such coordination may restrict competition and distort market pricing mechanisms.

Competition authorities note that agreements or practices that effectively standardize prices among competing firms may constitute price fixing, which is prohibited under antitrust and competition laws in many jurisdictions. Such practices are of particular concern in markets with a small number of suppliers, where coordinated pricing can more easily be sustained and may lead to higher prices and reduced consumer welfare.
