= Northeast Ohio Council on Higher Education =

Nonprofit business and higher education collaborative

Northeast Ohio Council on Higher Education ("NOCHE") is a nonprofit business and higher education collaborative in a 23-county region of Northeast Ohio. NOCHE's member institutions of higher education include a cross section of public, private, two-year and four-year schools. Collectively, these institutions enroll more than 226,000 degree-seeking students from across the United States and the world and grant more than 35,000 certificates and degrees annually.

== Programs ==
=== NEOintern ===
NEOintern consists of a free online database where college students anywhere and organizations in Northeast Ohio can find each other for internships and co-ops. NOCHE program managers also present "Maximize Your ROI: Return On Intern" total internship and co-op management seminars for business and nonprofit leaders, human resource managers and internship/co-op coordinators.

=== Northeast Ohio Talent Dividend ===
The Northeast Ohio Talent Dividend is guided by a steering committee of business, education, civic, nonprofit and philanthropic stakeholders and an Action Plan with overarching goals to improve college readiness, increase retention to degree completion and increase degree attainment among adults with some college and no degree. On Wednesday, December 4, 2013, at Cultivating Our Talent, the 2013 Northeast Ohio Talent Dividend Summit, NOCHE announced that Northeast Ohio gained almost 58,000 college degree holders since 2009.

== Leadership ==
In 2014, NOCHE's Board of Trustees named Robert W. Briggs as president.

From 2007 to 2013, Ann Womer Benjamin served as executive director. Ms. Womer Benjamin came to NOCHE after serving in the Governor's Cabinet as Director of the Ohio Department of Insurance. She was in the state legislature for eight years prior to that. Ms. Womer Benjamin is an attorney by trade. Her accomplishments during her tenure at NOCHE were documented in an email to the organization's board of trustees in late 2013. Some of those accomplishments are as follows:

- $900,000 – wage reimbursements administered to more than 400 interns at 100 companies from the Ohio Third Frontier Internship program and others
- 18,523 – the number of new students registered in NEOintern (a 563 percent increase since ClevelandIntern.net became NEOintern in 2008)
- 960 – the number of new businesses registered in NEOintern (a 60 percent increase since ClevelandIntern.net became NEOintern)
- 65 – the number of Northeast Ohio start-up companies receiving internship management services, including placing 180 interns, through the Entrepreneurial Internship Program
- 2 – the number of Northeast Ohio universities public trustees meetings and annual reports NOCHE has coordinated at the request of the Ohio Board of Regents
- a Northeast Ohio Universities Collaboration and Innovation Study Commission report commissioned by the Ohio General Assembly, from which some recommendations had been implemented

== History ==
The framework for what eventually became NOCHE began in 1951 when a group of locals obtained a grant from the Cleveland Foundation to conduct a study to “look into the condition of higher education in Cuyahoga County and recommend potential avenues of cooperation and coordination.” As a result of the study, the Cleveland Commission on Higher Education was formed with the following initial members: Baldwin-Wallace College, Case Institute of Technology, Fenn College, John Carroll University and Western Reserve University.

=== Higher Education in Post-World War II Cleveland ===
The driving forces for the creation of the commission were the increase in college-ready students due to the end of World War II, and the GI Bill, which gave military veterans free or reduced tuition. An enrollment increase of 30% in the decade following the war greatly strained the enrollment capacities of the region's higher education institutions. In addition, some students lacked a sufficient secondary education that would allow them to succeed in college. To remedy these problems, the Commission recommended the creation of a two-year college in the area. This recommendation eventually led to the formation of Cuyahoga Community College in 1963. However, still no public four-year university existed in Cuyahoga County. The realization of the need for more affordable education led the commission to push for the creation of a local public university. Because of these efforts, with help from other regional groups, Fenn College became Cleveland State University in 1964.

One of the more significant historical events in higher education in Northeast Ohio occurred in 1967, when the commission and other groups lobbied for the merger of the Case Institute of Technology and Western Reserve University. The merger eventually was realized in 1967 with the formation of Case Western Reserve University.

During the late 1980s and into the 1990s, the Commission expanded its membership significantly across Northeast Ohio. To reflect this expanded geographic activity, the Commission changed its name to the Northeast Ohio Council on Higher Education, or NOCHE.

== Member institutions ==
NOCHE's members are as follows:

- Cleveland Institute of Music
- Cleveland State University
- Cuyahoga Community College
- Hiram College
- Eastern Gateway Community College
- Kent State University
- Lakeland Community College
- Lorain County Community College
- Northeast Ohio Medical University
- Stark State College of Technology
- The University of Akron
- University of Phoenix
- Youngstown State University
