= Outright =

Accounting software application

- Company type: Private
- Industry: Online Accounting, Bookkeeping Taxes, Schedule C
- Founded: 2008
- Defunct: July 18, 2022
- Headquarters: Mountain View, California
- Key people: Kevin Reeth; (Co-Founder); Ben Curren; (Co-Founder); Steven Aldrich; (CEO)
- Owner: GoDaddy
- Number of employees: 16 (2014)
- Website: www.outright.com

Outright was an accounting and bookkeeping software application that assists small businesses and sole proprietors with managing their business's income and expenses.

The software also provided means to organize and categorize expenses for filing a United States Schedule C tax return. It was acquired by GoDaddy in 2012 for approximately $20 million and had been rebranded as GoDaddy Online Bookkeeping. In May 2022, GoDaddy announced the software would be discontinued on June 18, 2022.

== History ==
Kevin Reeth and Ben Curren worked together at Intuit in 2006 and then later at a web-application firm called Esomnie LLC. As a Product Manager and Software Engineer respectively, the two were heavily involved in the development and marketing of Quicken products.

Curren and Reeth had become increasingly frustrated with the complexity of doing taxes for small businesses, so in 2008 they founded a company and website called BootStrap. The Website was renamed Outright just a few months after launch, though it continues to be operated by BootStrap, Inc.

The BootStrap website existed for only a few months before being renamed Outright

In 2009, the company raised a total of $7.7 million funding from Sequoia Capital, First Round Capital, Shasta Ventures and SoftTech VC among others. Today, the website manages $1.2 billion in transactions from small businesses and independent contractors.

On July 17, 2012, Outright.com announced in an email to all customers that they had been acquired by GoDaddy.com.

== Functions ==
The software was designed as a software as a service model. It provided the following functions:

- Tracked and managed business income, expenses and tax liabilities.
- Data import - The application could import financial information from PayPal, FreshBooks, oDesk, and other financial management tools.
- Reports income and expenses for sole proprietors filing a Schedule C or 1040
- Managed W-9s for paying independent contractors, freelancers, and anyone outside of company staff for 1099 filings
- On-line selling on eBay Bookkeeping Selling Manager app that imported transaction data from eBay and PayPal accounts to help eBay sellers manage their finances.
