= Price stability =

Monetary policy

Price stability occurs when average consumer prices for goods and services are constant over time, or when they are rising at a low and predictable rate. It is a goal of monetary and fiscal policy aiming to support sustainable rates of economic activity. Policy is set to maintain a very low rate of inflation or deflation. For example, the European Central Bank (ECB) describes price stability as a year-on-year increase in the Harmonised Index of Consumer Prices (HICP) for the Euro area of below 2%. However, by referring to "an increase in the HICP of below 2%" the ECB makes clear that not only persistent inflation above 2% but also deflation (i.e. a persistent decrease of the general price level) are inconsistent with the goal of price stability.

In the United States, the Federal Reserve Act (as amended in 1977) directs the Federal Reserve to pursue policies promoting "maximum employment, stable prices, and moderate long-term interest rates". The Fed long ago determined that the best way to meet those mandates is to target a rate of inflation of around 2%; in 2011 it officially adopted a 2% annual increase in the personal consumption expenditures price index (often called PCE inflation) as the target. Since the mid-trend 1990s, the Federal Reserve's measure of the inflation trend averaged 1.7%, a mere 0.3% shy of the Federal Open Market Committee’s 2% target for overall PCE inflation. Trend inflation as measured by the price index of core personal consumption expenditures (PCE) – that is, excluding food and energy – has fluctuated between 1.2% and 2.3% over the past 20 years.

In managing the rate of inflation or deflation, information and expectations play an important role, as explained by Jeffrey Lacker, President of the Federal Reserve Bank of Richmond: "If people expect inflation to erode the future value of money, they will rationally place a lower value on money today. This principle applies equally well to the price-setting behavior of firms. If a firm expects the general level of prices to rise by 3 percent over the coming year, it will take into account the expected increase in the costs of inputs and the prices of substitutes when setting its own prices today."

== See also ==
- Consumer price index by country
- Inflation targeting
- List of countries by inflation rate
