= Robert P. Black =

American economist (1927–2024)

Robert Black
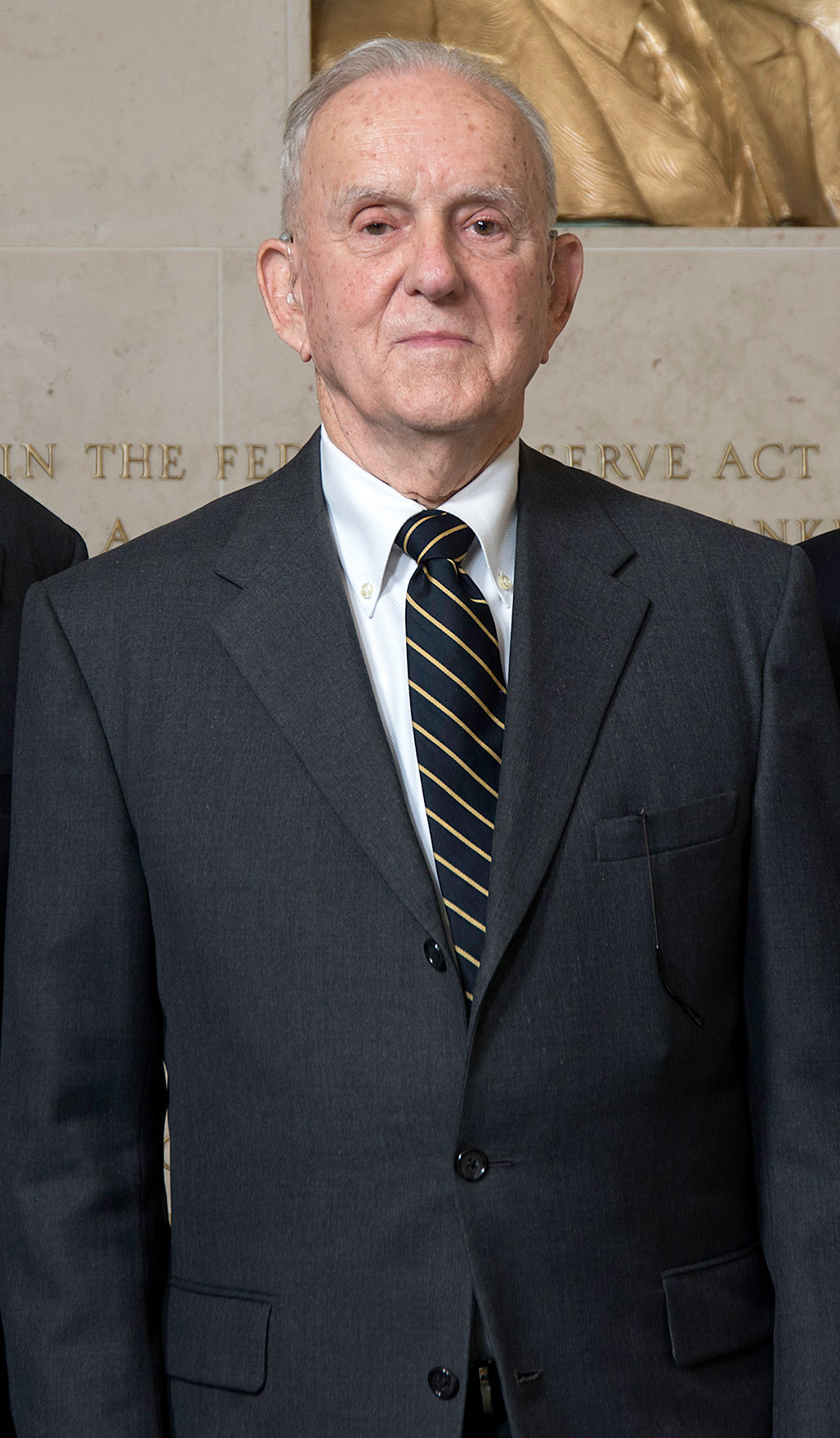

President of the Federal Reserve Bank of Richmond
- In office 1973–1992
- Preceded by: Aubrey Heflin
- Succeeded by: J. Alfred Broaddus

Personal details
- Born: December 21, 1927 Hickman, Kentucky, U.S.
- Died: December 5, 2024 (aged 96) Richmond, Virginia, U.S.
- Resting place: Hollywood Cemetery
- Education: University of Virginia (BA, MA, PhD)

Robert P. Black (December 21, 1927 – December 5, 2024) was an American economist who was the fifth president (1973–1992) of the Federal Reserve Bank of Richmond, the headquarters of the Fifth District of the Federal Reserve System. He was preceded in that position by Aubrey N. Heflin and succeeded by J. Alfred Broaddus (1993–2004) and Jeffrey Lacker (August 1, 2004 – April 4, 2017).

== Education and teaching ==
After cutting short his initial studies at the University of Virginia and serving in the United States Army, Black returned to UVA and earned a bachelor's degree, master's degree, and doctorate in economics. In 1955 he taught for one year at the University of Tennessee. He completed his Ph.D. dissertation in 1954 after beginning his work at the Richmond Federal Reserve Bank.

== Career and community activities ==
At the Fed, Black became an assistant vice president, vice president, and first-vice president before becoming the president of the FRB Richmond branch. Black and his two successors as president of the Richmond Fed, J. Alfred Broaddus and Jeffrey Lacker, discussed in an interview for the Richmond Times-Dispatch the changes that occurred in economic trends, the banking community, and the city of Richmond during their tenures at the bank.

According to Charles L. Weise, in April 1978, following President Carter's announcement of an anti-inflation package, the economist Stephen Axilrod, who was the FRB Staff Director for Monetary and Financial Policy, argued that a reduction in the target range for M1 would add credibility to the administration's inflation targets, while an increase in ranges "would not appear supportive" of the program. Robert P. Black, then president of the Federal Reserve Bank of Richmond, urged the Federal Open Market Committee to focus on inflation to take advantage of the fact that "everybody thinks that the administration, Congress, and the Federal Reserve are all committed to fighting inflation as a primary target." The Fed did indeed begin to tighten in the summer of 1978. By August the federal funds rate began to rise at a rate faster than the increase in inflation for the first time since the 1974 disinflation attempt.

In 1990, Black, who was considered an "inflation hawk" testified in support of United States House of Representatives Joint Resolution 409, sponsored by Congressman Stephen Neal, a Democrat from North Carolina, which would have required the Federal Reserve Bank to achieve zero inflation within five years of passage.

He was the first economist to become a Richmond FRB president. As president of the Federal Reserve Bank of Richmond his opinion as an inflation hawk was highly respected, and he was often interviewed about the direction of the U.S. economy. He served on the board of directors of the Richmond Eye and Ear Hospital, Retreat Health Systems, the Virginia Inter-Government Institute, the Governor's Commission on Defense Conversion and Economic Adjustment, and the Virginia Economic Recovery Commission. He was a member of the advisory boards of the Health Corporation of Virginia, the Center for Advanced Studies of the University of Virginia, and J. Sargeant Reynolds Community College Educational Foundation. He served on the board of governors and executive committee of the Capital Area Assembly and was a board trustee of the Academy for Economic Education and board chairman of Virginia United Methodist Homes.

== Death ==
Black died in his sleep at his home in Richmond, on December 5, 2024, at the age of 96. He was buried in Hollywood Cemetery.

== Publications and speeches ==
Robert P. Black's contributions to the Federal Reserve Bank of Richmond's Economic Review include:

- Jan/Feb, 1991

Reflections on Deposit Insurance

- Jul/Aug, 1990

Reflections on the Strategy of Monetary Policy

- Jan/Feb, 1990

In Support of Price Stability

- Sep/Oct, 1987

The Fed's Anti-Inflationary Strategy: Is it Adequate?

- Jul/Aug, 1984

The Fed's Mandate: Help or Hindrance?

- Sep/Oct, 1981

Monetary Policy – The Possible and the Impossible A Federal Reserve president wields influence.

Other offices
Preceded by Aubrey Heflin	President of the Federal Reserve Bank of Richmond; 1973–1992	Succeeded by J. Alfred Broaddus
