= Federal Reserve Bank of Richmond Baltimore Branch =

The Federal Reserve Bank of Richmond Baltimore Branch Office is one of the two Federal Reserve Bank of Richmond branch offices. The Federal Reserve Bank of Richmond's Baltimore Branch is an operational and regional center for Maryland, the metropolitan Washington D.C. area, Northern Virginia, and northeastern West Virginia. The Baltimore branch is part of the Fifth District and has the code E5. It supports Check 21 operations, supplies coin and currency to financial institutions and works to maintain stability in the financial sector throughout the Fifth District and also works with local elected officials and non-profit organizations to support fair housing initiatives throughout the Fifth District. The Baltimore branch was founded in March 1918 and is currently headed by William R. Roberts.

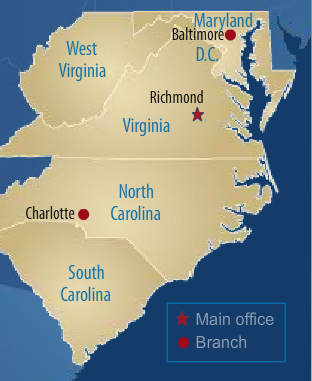
Federal Reserve Bank of Richmond District

Each branch of the Federal Reserve Banks has a board of either seven or five directors, a majority of whom are appointed by the parent Federal Reserve Bank; the others are appointed by the Board of Governors. Branch directors serve staggered three-year terms (two-year terms if the Branch has five directors). One of the members appointed by the Federal Reserve Board is designated annually as chairman of the board of that Branch in a manner prescribed by the parent Federal Reserve Bank. The Baltimore branch currently allows private and educational tours of up to thirty people with reservations. Cell phones and cameras are not permitted inside the building. The Federal Reserve Bank of Richmond Baltimore Branch Office sponsors the annual Fed Challenge to encourage better understanding of the nation's central bank and the forces influencing economic conditions in the United States and abroad. In 1997, the Federal Reserve Bank of Richmond- Baltimore Branch won the silver U.S. Senate Productivity and Maryland Quality Award. In 2008, Dorothy Voorhees received the Federal Reserve Bank of Richmond Baltimore Branch 2008 Excellence Award for outstanding achievement in the study of economics.

== News ==
On April 18, 2009, the Baltimore branch office of the Federal Reserve Bank of Richmond will no longer process checks, and banks currently served by that office will be reassigned to the head office of the Federal Reserve Bank of Philadelphia.

== Historic building ==
- Federal Reserve Bank of Richmond, Baltimore Branch
- U.S. National Register of Historic Places
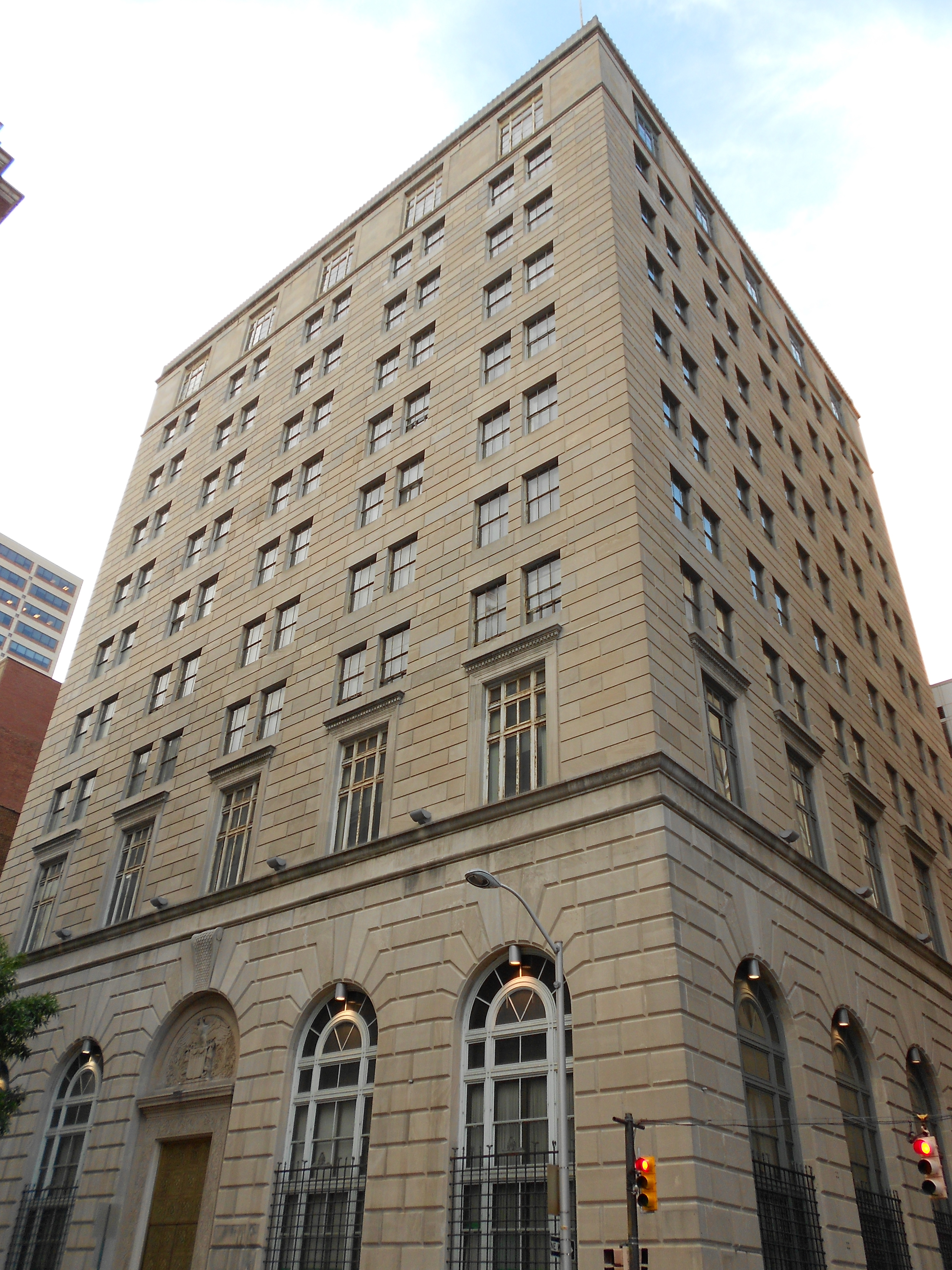

- Location within Baltimore Location within Maryland Location within the United States
- Location: 114 E. Lexington St., Baltimore, Maryland
- Coordinates: 39°17′28.9″N 76°36′46″W
- Area: 0.3 acres (0.12 ha)
- Built: 1926
- Architects: Taylor & Fisher
- Architectural style: Late 19th And 20th Century Revivals, 2nd Renaissance Revival
- NRHP reference No.: 83002933
- Added to NRHP: January 27, 1983

The previous Baltimore Federal Reserve Branch Bank building is a historic bank building. It is a masonry and steel, ten story building and five bays wide on each elevation, designed in 1926 in the Second Renaissance Revival Style. The exterior features rusticated limestone facing, with carvings and enormous arched windows on the first floor. The interior features an enormous main banking room with floors, teller stations, and Corinthian columns all of polished marble. It was expanded in 1956. It is now the Lenore Apartments.

The Federal Reserve Bank of Richmond, Baltimore Branch was listed on the National Register of Historic Places in 1983. It is included within the Baltimore National Heritage Area

== Employment ==
Employees of the Federal Reserve Bank of Richmond Baltimore Branch Office are not government employees. Instead, they are paid as part of the expenses of their employing Reserve Bank. This means that they are not eligible for federal employee benefits which include healthcare, additional legal rights, and a government pension. The Federal Reserve Bank of Richmond, Baltimore Branch has a 2009 Spring Student Internship Paid Position available to junior and senior college students. Students must be able to work between 16–24 hours per week and the starting salary begins at $18.98 per hour. The students are required to relocate to Baltimore, Maryland as part of their internship.

== Current Board of Directors ==
The following people are on the board of directors as of 2013:

=== Appointed by the Federal Reserve Bank ===
Appointed by the Federal Reserve Bank
Name	Title	Term Expires
William B. Grant	Chairman and Chief Executive Officer; First United Corp. and First United Bank & Trust; Oakland, Maryland	2013
Richard Bernstein	President and Chief Executive Officer; LWRC International, LLC; Cambridge, Maryland	2014
Anita G. Newcomb	President and Managing Director; A. G. Newcomb & Co. Columbia, Maryland	2015
Christopher J. Estes	President and Chief Executive Officer; National Housing Conference; Washington, D.C.	2015

=== Appointed by the Board of Governors ===
Appointed by the Board of Governors
Name	Title	Term Expires
Samuel L. Ross, M.D.	Chief Executive Officer; Bon Secours Baltimore Health System; Baltimore, Maryland	2013
Jenny G. Morgan (Chair)	President basys, inc. Linthicum, Maryland	2014
Stephen R. Sleigh	Fund Director; IAM National Pension Fund; Washington, D.C.	2015

== Conferences ==
- "Understanding New Markets Tax Credits," Wall Street Without Walls Training Workshop at the Federal Reserve Bank of Richmond, Baltimore Branch, Baltimore, Maryland, July 22, 2003.
- "Transitional Employment Models," The Enterprise Foundation Ready, Work, Grow National Workforce Conference, Baltimore, Maryland, April 2003.

== See also ==
- Federal Reserve Act
- Federal Reserve System
- Federal Reserve Districts
- Federal Reserve Branches
- Federal Reserve Bank of Richmond
- Federal Reserve Bank of Richmond Charlotte Branch Office

== Citations ==
- Straw, Becky (December 16, 2008). "Economics students participate in Fed Challenge competition". News Article. College of Business and Economics Lehigh University • 621 Taylor Street, Rauch Business Center, Bethlehem, PA 18015. Archived from the original on June 15, 2011.
- "Benton Wilmoth '05 Learns through White House and Export-Import Bank Internships:Lafayette stipend supports summer work experience in Washington". Academic News. Lafayette College. June 17, 2004. Archived from the original on March 5, 2007.
- "Campus Invited to Watch Final Practice Run for College Fed Challenge Today:Students preparing for presentation to Federal Reserve Bank economists and officers". Student Activities. Lafayette College. November 12, 2003. Archived from the original on September 6, 2006.
