= Tom Barkin =

American central banker

Thomas Barkin

8th President of the Federal Reserve Bank of Richmond
- Incumbent
- Assumed office January 1, 2018
- Preceded by: Jeffrey M. Lacker

Personal details
- Born: 1961 (age 64–65) Tampa, Florida, U.S.
- Spouse: Robyn Rieser Barkin
- Education: Harvard University (BA, JD/MBA)

Thomas I. Barkin (born 1961) is an American central banker, currently serving as the 8th president and CEO of the Federal Reserve Bank of Richmond since January 2018, and member of the Federal Open Market Committee.

== Early life and education ==
Barkin was born and raised in Tampa, Florida.

Graduated from Harvard University, Barkin received a Bachelor of Arts degree (with a major in economics) in 1983 and a JD/MBA joint degree in 1987.

== Career ==
Barkin worked for global management consulting firm McKinsey for 30 years. From 2009 to 2015, Barkin served as the firm's chief financial officer.

Most recently, Barkin was a senior partner in McKinsey's Atlanta office, where his primary client focus was helping financial institutions and travel and transportation companies. From 2015 to 2017, he served as the McKinsey's chief risk officer.

== Board membership ==
While in Atlanta, he served on the executive committee of the Metro Atlanta Chamber of Commerce. He is a member of the Emory University Board of Trustees. He also was a member of the executive board of the United States Golf Association, and in 2017 on the board's Audit, Finance and Handicap Committees.

Barkin served on the board of directors for the Federal Reserve Bank of Atlanta from 2009 to 2014, and was the board’s chairman from 2013 to 2014.

== Personal life ==
Barkin and his wife, Robyn Rieser Barkin, have two children.

== See also ==
- Federal Reserve System
- Federal Reserve Bank of Richmond

Other offices
Preceded by Jeffrey M. Lacker	President of the Federal Reserve Bank of Richmond; 2018–present	Incumbent
