= Federal Reserve Bank of Richmond Charlotte Branch =

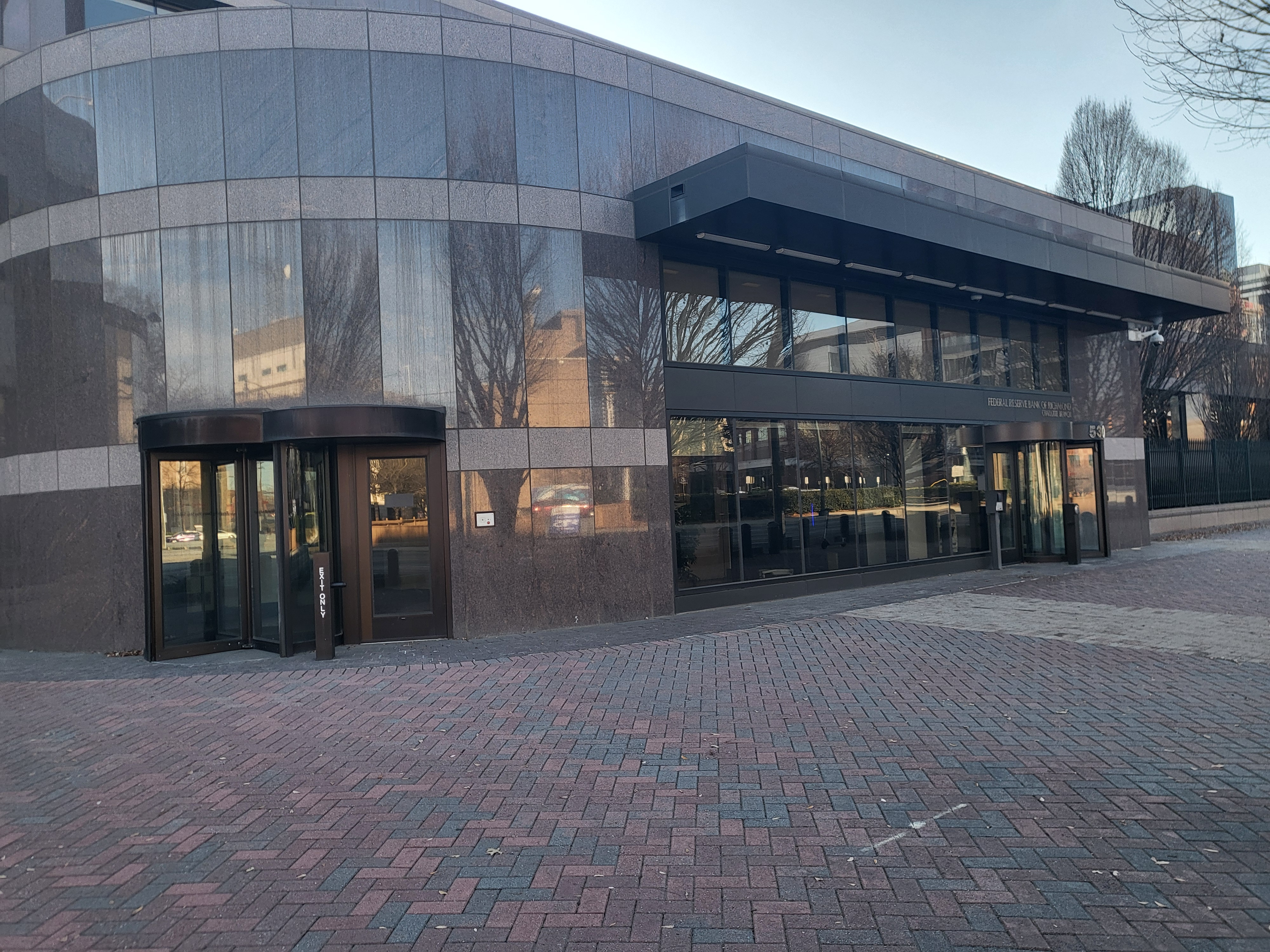
- Charlotte Branch in March 2024
- Interactive map of the Federal Reserve Bank of Richmond Charlotte Branch area

General information
- Type: Low-rise building
- Architectural style: Modern
- Location: 530 East Trade Street; Charlotte, North Carolina
- Coordinates: 35°13′22″N 80°50′21″W
- Opened: 1985

Height
- Height: 66.37 feet (20.23 m)

Technical details
- Floor count: 5

Design and construction
- Architects: Odell & Associates

Other information
- Parking: On site (reserved)
- Public transit: Davidson Street

The Federal Reserve Bank of Richmond Charlotte Branch Office is one of the two Federal Reserve Bank of Richmond branch offices. Established in 1927, The Federal Reserve Bank of Richmond's Charlotte Branch is an operational and regional center for the Carolinas, including the nation's second largest financial center in Charlotte, North Carolina. They promote the safety and soundness of large bank holding companies headquartered in Charlotte. They distribute currency and coin to financial institutions in the region and provide check adjustment services for the Federal Reserve System. Their public programs include forums and conferences, economic education outreach, tours and a speakers’ bureau.

== History ==
Established on December 1, 1927, the Charlotte Branch was located on the 20th floor of the First National Bank Building. It was set up to primarily serve the industrial Piedmont region of North and South Carolina; in its first full year of operation in 1928, the Charlotte Branch handled nearly 6.6 million checks worth almost $1.7 billion and received and shipped over $40 million in currency. On January 20, 1942, the Charlotte Branch relocated into a new three-story, ancient-style (a blending of Art Moderne, Art Deco, and Neoclassical architecture) building located at 401 South Tryon Street. In 1955-56, two stories were added to the building, as well as a rectangular rear extension. By 1970, the Charlotte Branch acquired an adjacent building and added a second-story enclosed walkway to link the buildings together.

In 1985, the Charlotte Branch moved to its third and current location at 530 East Trade Street. The five-story, modernist building, includes a three-story underground vault encased in steel used for currency storage and exchange. In 2009, check-processing operations at the Charlotte Branch were discontinued as the system was transferred to electronic check-clearing; leaving only currency storage, exchange, and shredding operations.

== Board of directors ==
The following people are on the board of directors as of 2026:

=== Appointed by the Federal Reserve Bank ===
Name	Title	Term expires on December 31
Lori Hudson	Senior Vice President and Chief Financial Officer; National Gypsum Company; Charlotte, North Carolina	2026
Samuel L. Erwin	Executive Vice President; First Horizon Bank; Greenville, South Carolina	2027
Susan Mims, MD	President and Chief Executive Officer; Dogwood Health Trust; Asheville, North Carolina	2027
Dionne Nelson	President and Chief Executive Officer; Laurel Street Residential; Charlotte, North Carolina	2028

=== Appointed by the Board of Governors ===
Name	Title	Term expires on December 31
Omar Jorge	Chief Executive Officer; Compare Foods Supermarkets; Charlotte, North Carolina	2026
George Dean Johnson, III	Chief Executive Officer; The Johnson Group; Spartanburg, South Carolina	2027
John J. Purcell	Managing Partner; Ridgemont Equity Partners; Charlotte, North Carolina	2028

== Past members ==
- Linda L. Dolny
- James F. Goodmon, Jr.
- Jeff Kane, to retire on March 1, will be replaced by Matthew Martin
- Matthew Martin, Senior Vice President and Charlotte Regional Executive
- Bernett William Mazyck
- Barbara Melvin
- James H. Speed, Jr.

== See also ==
- Federal Reserve Act
- Federal Reserve System
- Federal Reserve Districts
- Federal Reserve Branches
- Federal Reserve Bank of Richmond
- Federal Reserve Bank of Richmond Baltimore Branch Office
