= List of countries by central bank interest rates =

This is a list of countries by annualized interest rate set by the central bank for charging commercial, depository banks for loans to meet temporary shortages of funds.

List of sovereign states by central bank interest rates
Country or currency union	Nominal central bank interest rate (%)	Change since most recent decision	Effective date of last change
Afghanistan	6.00	▲3.00	24 July 2021
Albania	2.50	▼0.25	2 July 2025
Algeria	2.50	▼0.50	7 January 2026
Angola	14.00	▼0.75	17 November 2026
Argentina	29.00	▼3.00	31 January 2025
Armenia	7.00	▲0.25	3 November 2026
Australia	4.85	▲0.25	3 November 2026
Azerbaijan	6.50	▼0.25	4 February 2026
Bahamas	4.00	▼0.50	22 December 2016
Bahrain	4.50	▲0.25	16 September 2026
Bangladesh	9.50	▼0.50	2 August 2026
Barbados	2.00	▼5.00	1 April 2020
Belarus	9.25	▼0.50	20 May 2026
Bolivia	3.65	▲0.06	1 September 2026
Botswana	5.50	▲2.00	30 April 2026
Brazil	13.75	▼0.25	16 September 2026
Cameroon	4.50	▼0.25	29 June 2026
Canada	2.50	▲0.25	28 October 2026
Cape Verde	1.50	▲0.25	16 May 2024
Central African States	4.50	▼0.25	29 June 2026
Chad	4.50	▼0.25	29 June 2026
Chile	4.50	▼0.25	16 December 2025
China	3.00	▼0.10	20 May 2025
Colombia	12.25	▲0.25	30 September 2026
Costa Rica	3.00	▼0.25	24 July 2026
DR Congo	12.50	▼1.00	18 July 2026
Curacao	4.50	▲0.25	17 September 2026
Czech Republic	4.00	▲0.25	5 November 2026
Denmark	2.10	▲0.25	10 September 2026
Dominican Republic	5.50	▼0.25	30 September 2025
Eastern Caribbean	3.00	▲1.00	28 January 2024
Egypt	20.00	▲1.00	29 October 2026
Equatorial Guinea	4.50	▼0.25	29 June 2026
Eswatini	6.75	▼0.25	30 May 2025
Ethiopia	16.00	▲1.00	13 July 2026
(European Union) Eurozone	2.50	▲0.25	10 September 2026
Fiji	0.25	▼0.25	18 March 2020
Gabon	4.50	▼0.25	29 June 2026
Gambia	14.00	▼2.00	26 February 2026
Georgia	8.25	▲0.25	7 May 2026
Ghana	11.00	▼3.00	19 November 2026
Guatemala	4.00	▼0.25	24 September 2025
Honduras	5.75	▲1.75	28 October 2024
Hong Kong	4.25	▲0.25	17 September 2026
Hungary	5.50	▼0.25	25 August 2026
Iceland	8.00	▲0.25	19 August 2026
India	5.50	▲0.25	7 October 2026
Indonesia	6.00	▲0.25	18 November 2026
Iran	23.00	▼0.60	8 March 2023
Israel	3.25	▼0.25	1 September 2026
Jamaica	6.50	▲0.50	17 November 2026
Japan	1.25	▲0.25	18 September 2026
Jordan	5.75	▼0.25	14 December 2025
Kazakhstan	15.75	▼0.50	23 October 2026
Kenya	8.75	▼0.25	10 February 2026
Kuwait	3.50	▼0.25	11 December 2025
Kyrgyzstan	12.00	▲1.00	24 February 2026
Laos	7.00	▼1.00	22 August 2026
Lebanon	25.00	▲5.00	April 2026
Lesotho	6.50	▼0.25	25 November 2025
Liberia	16.00	▼0.25	21 July 2026
Macau	4.25	▲0.25	17 September 2026
Madagascar	12.50	▲0.50	4 August 2026
Malawi	24.00	▼2.00	5 March 2026
Malaysia	2.75	▼0.25	9 July 2025
Mauritius	4.75	▲0.25	20 May 2026
Mexico	6.25	▼0.25	5 November 2026
Moldova	9.00	▲1.50	17 September 2026
Mongolia	12.50	▲0.50	12 August 2026
Morocco	2.25	▼0.25	18 March 2025
Mozambique	9.25	▼0.25	28 February 2026
Namibia	7.00	▲0.25	28 October 2026
New Zealand	2.75	▲0.25	2 September 2026
Nicaragua	6.00	▼0.25	2 October 2025
Nigeria	23.00	▼3.50	22 September 2026
North Macedonia	4.25	▲0.25	16 June 2026
Norway	4.50	▲0.25	23 September 2026
Oman	4.50	▲0.25	17 September 2026
Pakistan	12.00	▲0.50	26 October 2026
Papua New Guinea	5.00	▲1.00	2 September 2025
Paraguay	5.75	▼0.25	21 February 2026
Peru	4.50	▲0.25	12 November 2026
Philippines	5.50	▲0.50	22 October 2026
Poland	3.75	▼0.25	4 March 2026
Qatar	4.35	▲0.25	17 September 2026
Republic of the Congo	4.50	▼0.25	29 June 2026
Romania	6.50	▼0.25	8 August 2024
Russia	14.00	▼0.25	24 July 2026
Rwanda	8.75	▲0.50	27 August 2026
Samoa	2.95	▲2.58	January 2026
Saudi Arabia	4.50	▲0.25	16 September 2026
Serbia	6.00	▲0.25	12 November 2026
Seychelles	1.75	▼0.25	26 March 2024
Sierra Leone	17.25	▲0.25	28 September 2026
Sint Maarten	4.50	▲0.25	17 September 2026
South Africa	7.25	▲0.25	23 September 2026
South Korea	3.00	▲0.25	27 August 2026
South Sudan	13.00	▲1.00	10 June 2025
Sri Lanka	9.00	▲0.25	20 November 2026
Suriname	10.00	▲1.00	18 September 2013
Sweden	2.00	▲0.25	4 November 2026
Switzerland	0.00	▼0.25	20 June 2025
Taiwan	2.00	▲0.125	22 March 2024
Tajikistan	7.00	▼0.50	2 February 2026
Tanzania	6.25	▲0.50	3 July 2026
Thailand	1.00	▼0.25	24 July 2026
Trinidad and Tobago	3.50	▼1.50	17 March 2020
Tunisia	7.00	▼0.50	7 January 2026
Turkey	36.00	▼1.00	22 October 2026
Uganda	12.00	▲2.25	14 October 2026
Ukraine	16.00	▲0.50	18 September 2026
UAE	3.90	▲0.25	16 September 2026
United Kingdom	4.00	▲0.25	4 November 2026
United States	4.00	▲0.25	16 September 2026
Uruguay	6.00	▲0.25	8 October 2026
Uzbekistan	14.00	▲0.50	24 March 2025
Venezuela	58.91	▲0.31	4 January 2026
Vietnam	4.50	▼0.50	16 June 2023
West African States	3.00	▼0.25	16 March 2026
Yemen	27.00	▲12.00	19 September 2018
Zambia	10.75	▼2.50	30 September 2026
Zimbabwe	27.50	▼2.50	28 September 2026

Economists generally argue real interest rates, which are adjusted for inflation, tend to be more important than nominal rates when assessing monetary policy.

== See also ==
- Consumer price index by country
- List of countries by inflation rate
