= J. Alfred Broaddus =

American banker (1939–2025)

Alfred Broaddus
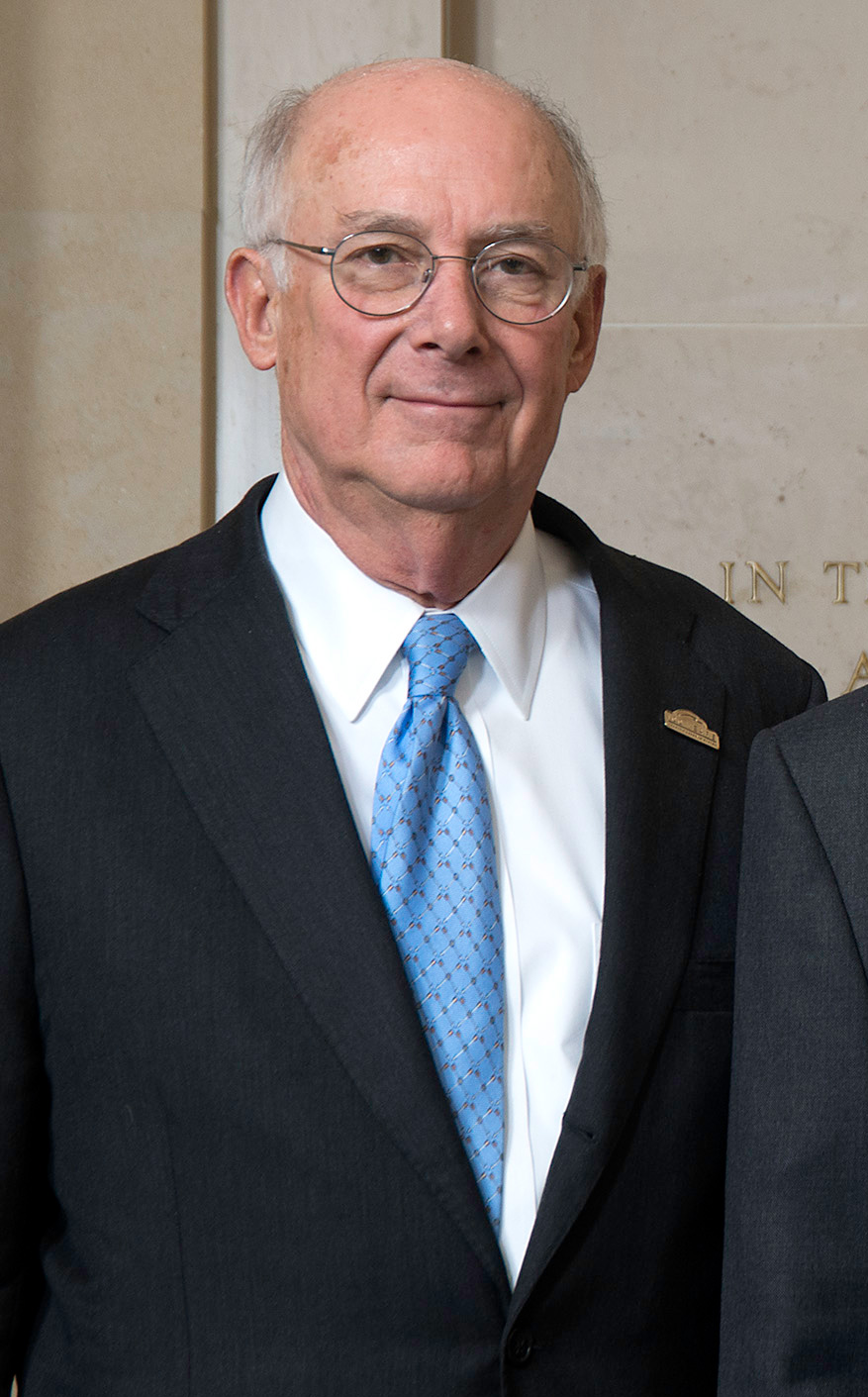

President of the Federal Reserve Bank of Richmond
- In office January 1, 1993 – July 31, 2004
- Preceded by: Robert P. Black
- Succeeded by: Jeffrey M. Lacker

Personal details
- Born: July 8, 1939 Richmond, Virginia, U.S.
- Died: October 26, 2025 (aged 86) Richmond, Virginia, U.S.
- Education: Washington and Lee University (BA); University of Strasbourg (DEA); Indiana University, Bloomington (MA, PhD)

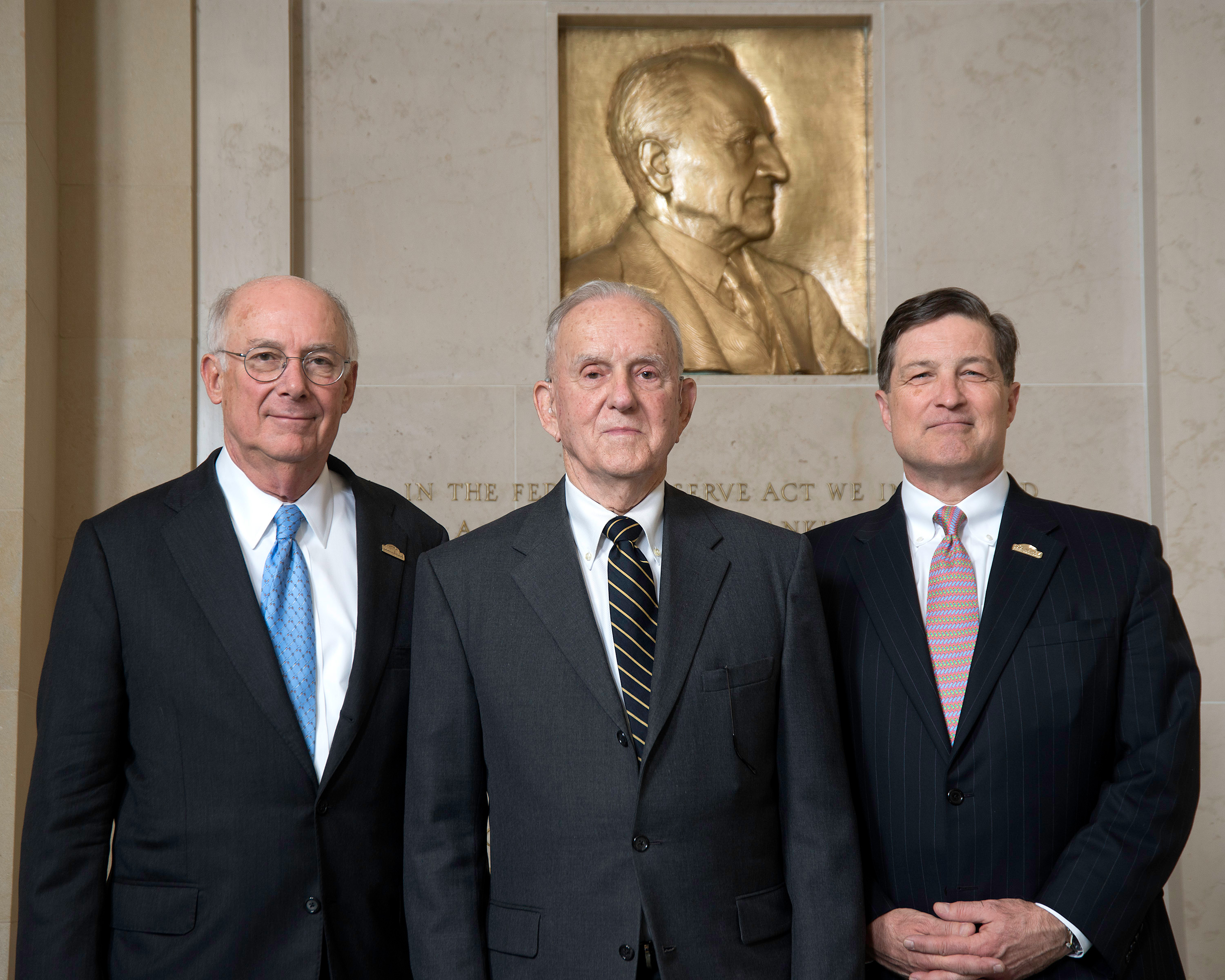
Former FRB Richmond Presidents (Left to Right: J. Alfred Broaddus Jr.; Robert P. Black; Jeffrey M. Lacker)

John Alfred Broaddus Jr. (July 8, 1939 – October 26, 2025) was an American banker and the sixth president of the Federal Reserve Bank of Richmond, headquarters of the Fifth District of the Federal Reserve System serving the District of Columbia, Maryland, North Carolina, South Carolina, Virginia, and most of West Virginia with the exception of the Northern Panhandle.

Broaddus succeeded Robert P. Black and served as the Richmond Fed's president from January 1, 1993, until his retirement on July 31, 2004. He was succeeded as president by Jeffrey M. Lacker.

== Education ==
Broaddus attended Thomas Jefferson High School (Richmond, Virginia), and in 2012 he was honored by Richmond Public Schools as an outstanding alumnus of the city's school system. Broaddus received a bachelor's degree in political science from Washington and Lee University in 1961. At W & L he was elected to Omicron Delta Kappa and Phi Beta Kappa. He studied abroad in France with a Fulbright Fellowship and received a graduate degree from the Center for Advanced European Studies at the University of Strasbourg before earning a master's degree and doctorate in economics from Indiana University Bloomington. He was awarded an honorary Doctor of Laws degree from Washington and Lee in 1993 and a Distinguished Alumnus Award from Indiana University in 1996.

== Bibliography ==
In 2000, he spoke about the European Monetary Union (EMU) at Davidson College, and his speech was reprinted for the University of Richmond's Journal of Law and Business. He co-authored "Sustaining Price Stability" with Marvin Goodfriend in 2004. Also in 2004 for the Federal Reserve Bank of Richmond's Economic Quarterly, he wrote "Macroeconomic Principles and Monetary Policy". Other FRB Richmond publications include in 2003 "Monetary Policy in a Low Inflation Environment" and in 2001 "Transparency in the Practice of Monetary Policy." Many of his speeches and articles may be read and downloaded from the Federal Reserve Bank of Richmond website.

== Civic service and corporate boards ==
He was the 2004 commencement speaker at Hampden-Sydney College. He served as a trustee for Virginia Commonwealth University and was a member of the advisory board for VCU Massey Cancer Center at VCU Medical Center. He was a board member for Albemarle Corp., Faison Enterprises, Inc., Markel Corporation, Owens & Minor and T. Rowe Price. He was a member of the Economic Advisory Panel for the Federal Reserve Bank of New York.

He held civic leadership posts for the Richmond Renaissance executive committee and the Virginia Historical Society’s board of directors. He was formerly chairman of United Way in Richmond and a member of the World Affairs Council of Greater Richmond, the American Civil War Center at Historic Tredegar, the Virginia Council on Economic Education, and Venture Richmond. He was a founding board member of Richmond Memorial Health Foundation (RMHF), and VCU Investment Management Company. He has served on the board of St. Christopher's School and served on the board of the Tredegar National Civil War Center Foundation and the boards of associates of Gallaudet University and the University of Richmond.

== Biography ==
Broaddus was a native of Richmond, Virginia. He served in the United States Army from 1962 to 1964. He was a US Official Researcher at the Defense Intelligence Agency from 1964 to 1966. He returned to Richmond to join the Federal Reserve Bank of Richmond's Research Department as a staff economist in 1970. He became assistant vice president from 1972 to 1975 and vice president between 1975 and 1985. He was promoted to research director and senior vice president in 1985. During his tenure at the Richmond Fed he participated in the Federal Open Market Committee (FOMC) meetings. He was known to be a "hawk on inflation." On March 10, 1993, he spoke before the Committee on Banking, Housing, and Urban Affairs at the United States Senate.

Both during his presidency and after, Broaddus was interviewed about the economy and the role of the Fed on Bloomberg Television and Bloomberg Radio. He has spoken at groups including the American Furniture Manufacturers Association and Levy Economic Institute of Bard College.

He and his wife, Margaret Lemley Broaddus had two sons and lived in Richmond. Broaddus died on October 26, 2025, at the age of 86.

Other offices
Preceded by Robert P. Black	President of the Federal Reserve Bank of Richmond; 1993–2004	Succeeded by Jeffrey M. Lacker
