= List of countries by inflation rate =

World map by annual inflation rate in % (consumer prices), 2024, according to World Bank: below -1 -1 to 0 0 to 1 1 to 2 2 to 3 / 3 to 4 4 to 5 5 to 20 above 20 no data

This is the list of countries by annual inflation rate. Inflation is defined as a positive annual percent change in consumer prices compared with the previous year's consumer prices, and means generally a decrease in purchasing power for the domestic currency in the country in question and a general increase in prices of goods and services compared to the currency. If the inflation rate is negative, that indicates deflation, a general decrease in prices of goods and services traded for a country's domestic currency.

According to World Bank, "the Consumer price index reflects changes in the cost to the average consumer of acquiring a basket of goods and services that may be fixed or changed at specified intervals, such as yearly. The Laspeyres formula is generally used. Data are period averages."

According to United Nations Conference on Trade and Development, "the Consumer Price Indices (CPI) is an inflationary indicator that measures the weighted average of prices of a basket of consumer goods and services, purchases by a consumer. The CPI is calculated by taking price changes for each item in the predetermined basket of goods and services during a month. Changes in CPI are used to assess price changes associated with the cost of living."

== List of countries by annual inflation rate ==
The following table provides information on the annual inflation of the consumer price indices based on data published by World Bank. For cumulative inflation or change in consumer price indices see list of consumer price indices.

Annual inflation rate of consumer price index in % (World Bank)
Country	2024	2023	2022	2021	2020	2019	2018	2017	2016	2015
Argentina	219.9	113.49	72.43	48.41	42.02	53.55	34.28	25.68		
Afghanistan	-6.6	-4.6	13.7	5.1	5.6	2.3	0.6	5.0	4.4	-0.7
Albania	2.2	4.8	6.7	2.0	1.6	1.4	2.0	2.0	1.3	1.9
Algeria	4.0	9.3	9.3	7.2	2.4	2.0	4.3	5.6	6.4	4.8
Angola	28.2	13.6	21.4	25.8	22.3	17.1	19.6	29.8	30.7	9.4
Antigua and Barbuda	6.2	5.1	7.5	2.1	0.6	1.4	1.2	2.4	-0.5	1.0
Armenia	0.3	2.0	8.6	7.2	1.2	1.4	2.5	1.0	-1.4	3.7
Aruba						4.3	3.6	-1.0	-0.9	0.5
Australia	3.2	5.6	6.6	2.9	0.8	1.6	1.9	1.9	1.3	1.5
Austria	2.9	7.8	8.5	2.8	1.4	1.5	2.0	2.1	0.9	0.9
Azerbaijan	2.2	8.8	13.9	6.7	2.8	2.6	2.3	12.9	12.4	4.0
Bahamas	0.4	3.1	5.6	2.9	0.0	2.5	2.3	1.5	-0.3	1.9
Bahrain	0.9	0.1	3.6	-0.6	-2.3	1.0	2.1	1.4	2.8	1.8
Bangladesh	10.5	9.9	7.7	5.5	5.7	5.6	5.5	5.7	5.5	6.2
Barbados	-0.5	9.8				4.1	3.7	4.7	1.3	-1.1
Belarus	5.8	5.0	15.2	9.5	5.5	5.6	4.9	6.0	11.8	13.5
Belgium	3.1	4.0	9.6	2.4	0.7	1.4	2.1	2.1	2.0	0.6
Belize	3.3	4.4	6.3	3.2	0.1	0.2	0.3	1.1	0.7	-0.9
Benin	1.2	2.7	1.4	1.7	3.0	0.7	0.9	0.0	-0.8	0.2
Bhutan	2.8	4.2	5.6	7.3	5.6	2.7	2.7	5.0	3.2	4.5
Bolivia	5.1	2.6	1.7	0.7	0.9	1.8	2.3	2.8	3.6	4.1
Bosnia and Herzegovina	1.7	6.1	14.0	2.0	-1.1	0.6	1.4	0.8	-1.6	-1.0
Botswana	2.8	5.1	11.7	7.2	1.9	2.8	3.2	3.3	2.8	3.1
Brazil	4.4	4.6	9.3	8.3	3.2	3.7	3.7	3.4	8.7	9.0
Brunei Darussalam	-0.4	0.4	3.7	1.7	1.9	-0.4	1.0	-1.3	-0.3	-0.5
Bulgaria	2.4	9.4	15.3	3.3	1.7	3.1	2.8	2.1	-0.8	-0.1
Burkina Faso	4.2	0.7	14.3	3.7	1.9	-3.2	2.0	1.5	0.4	0.7
Burundi	20.2	26.9	18.8	8.4	7.3	-0.7	-2.8	16.1	5.6	5.5
Cabo Verde	1.0	3.7	7.9	1.9	0.6	1.1	1.3	0.8	-1.4	0.1
Cambodia		2.1	5.3	2.9	2.9	1.9	2.5	2.9	3.0	1.2
Cameroon	4.5	7.4	6.2	2.3	2.4	2.5	1.1	0.6	0.9	2.7
Canada	2.4	3.9	6.8	3.4	0.7	1.9	2.3	1.6	1.4	1.1
Cayman Islands									-0.6	-2.3
Central African Republic		3.0	5.6	4.3	1.7	2.7	1.6	4.2	4.9	1.4
Chad	8.9	10.8	5.8	-0.8	4.5	-1.0	4.3	-1.5	-0.8	4.4
Chile	4.3	7.6	11.6	4.5	3.0	2.6	2.4	2.2	3.8	4.3
China	0.2	0.2	2.0	1.0	2.4	2.9	2.1	1.6	2.0	1.4
Colombia	6.6	11.7	10.2	3.5	2.5	3.5	3.2	4.3	7.5	5.0
Costa Rica	-0.4	0.5	8.3	1.7	0.7	2.1	2.2	1.6	-0.0	0.8
Croatia	3.0	7.9	10.8	2.6	0.2	0.8	1.5	1.1	-1.1	-0.5
Curaçao						2.6	2.6	1.6	-0.0	-0.5
Cyprus	1.8	3.5	8.4	2.4	-0.6	0.3	1.4	0.5	-1.4	-2.1
Czech Republic	2.4	10.7	15.1	3.8	3.2	2.8	2.1	2.5	0.7	0.3
DR Congo									2.9	0.7
Denmark	1.4	3.3	7.7	1.9	0.4	0.8	0.8	1.1	0.3	0.5
Djibouti	2.1	1.5	5.2	1.2	1.8	3.3	0.1	0.6	2.7	-0.8
Dominica	2.6	5.1	2.9	2.2	1.2	1.5	1.0	0.3	0.1	-0.8
Dominican Republic	3.3	4.8	8.8	8.2	3.8	1.8	3.6	3.3	1.6	0.8
East Timor	2.1	8.4	7.0	3.7	0.5	1.0	2.6	0.6	-1.3	0.6
Ecuador	1.5	2.2	3.5	0.1	-0.3	0.3	-0.2	0.4	1.7	4.0
Egypt	28.3	33.9	13.9	5.2	5.0	9.2	14.4	29.5	13.8	10.4
El Salvador	0.9	4.0	7.2	3.5	-0.4	0.1	1.1	1.0	0.6	-0.7
Equatorial Guinea			4.8	-0.1	4.8	1.5	1.1	0.7	1.4	1.7
Estonia	3.5	9.2	19.4	4.7	-0.4	2.3	3.4	3.4	0.1	-0.5
Eswatini						2.6	4.8	6.2	7.8	5.0
Ethiopia	21.0	30.2	33.9	26.8	20.4	15.8	13.8	10.7	6.6	9.6
Fiji	4.5	2.3	4.3	0.2	-2.6	1.8	4.1	3.3	3.9	1.4
Finland	1.6	6.3	7.1	2.2	0.3	1.0	1.1	0.8	0.4	-0.2
France	2.0	4.9	5.2	1.6	0.5	1.1	1.9	1.0	0.2	0.0
Gabon	1.2	3.6	4.2	1.1	1.4	2.5	4.7	2.7	2.1	-0.3
Georgia	1.1	2.5	11.9	9.6	5.2	4.9	2.6	6.0	2.1	4.0
Germany	2.3	5.9	6.9	3.1	0.1	1.4	1.7	1.5	0.5	0.5
Ghana	22.8	38.1	31.3	10.0	9.9	7.1	7.8	12.4	17.5	17.1
Greece	2.7	3.5	9.6	1.2	-1.2	0.3	0.6	1.1	-0.8	-1.7
Grenada	1.1	2.7	2.6	1.2	-0.7	0.6	0.8	0.9	1.7	-0.5
Guatemala	2.9	6.2	6.9	4.3	3.2	3.7	3.8	4.4	4.4	2.4
Guinea	8.1	7.8	10.5	12.6	10.6	9.5	9.8	8.9	8.2	11.8
Guinea-Bissau	3.8	7.1	9.4	2.2	1.1	0.2	0.4	1.7	1.5	1.5
Guyana	2.9	2.8	6.1	5.0	1.0	2.1	1.3	1.9	0.8	-1.0
Haiti	26.9	36.8	34.0	16.8	22.8	18.7	12.5	10.7	11.5	6.7
Honduras	4.6	6.7	9.1	4.5	3.5	4.4	4.3	3.9	2.7	3.2
Hong Kong	1.7	2.1	1.9	1.6	0.3	2.9	2.4	1.5	2.4	3.0
Hungary	3.7	17.1	14.6	5.1	3.3	3.3	2.9	2.3	0.4	-0.1
Iceland	5.9	8.7	8.3	4.4	2.8	3.0	2.7	1.8	1.7	1.6
India	5.0	5.6	6.7	5.1	6.6	3.7	3.9	3.3	4.9	4.9
Indonesia		3.7	4.2	1.6	1.9	3.0	3.2	3.8	3.5	6.4
Iran	32.5	44.6	43.5	43.4	30.6	39.9	18.0	8.0	7.2	12.5
Iraq		4.4	5.0	6.0	0.6	-0.2	0.4	0.2	0.6	1.4
Ireland	2.1	6.3	7.8	2.3	-0.3	0.9	0.5	0.4	0.0	-0.3
Israel	3.1	4.2	4.4	1.5	-0.6	0.8	0.8	0.3	-0.6	-0.6
Italy	1.0	5.6	8.2	1.9	-0.1	0.6	1.1	1.2	-0.1	0.0
Ivory Coast	3.5	4.4	5.3	4.1	2.4	-1.1	0.4	0.7	0.7	1.3
Jamaica	5.4	6.5	10.3	5.9	5.2	3.9	3.7	4.4	2.4	3.7
Japan	2.7	3.3	2.5	-0.2	-0.0	0.5	1.0	0.5	-0.1	0.8
Jordan	1.6	2.1	4.2	1.3	0.3	0.8	4.5	3.3	-0.8	-0.9
Kazakhstan	8.8	14.7	15.0	8.0	6.7	5.3	6.2	7.4	14.4	6.7
Kenya	4.5	7.7	7.7	6.1	5.4	5.2	4.7	8.0	6.3	6.6
Kiribati		9.3	5.3	2.1	2.6	-1.8	0.6	0.4	1.9	0.6
Kosovo	1.6	4.9	11.6	3.4	0.2	2.7	1.1	1.5	0.3	-0.5
Kuwait	2.9	3.6	4.0	3.4	2.1	1.1	0.5	2.2	3.2	3.3
Kyrgyzstan		10.8	13.9	11.9	6.3	1.1	1.5	3.2	0.4	6.5
Laos	23.1	31.2	23.0	3.8	5.1	3.3	2.0	0.8	1.6	1.3
Latvia	1.3	8.9	17.3	3.3	0.2	2.8	2.5	2.9	0.1	0.2
Lebanon	45.2	221.3	171.2	154.8	84.9	3.0	6.1	4.3	-0.8	-3.7
Lesotho	6.1	6.3	8.3	6.0	5.0	5.2	4.8	4.4	6.6	3.2
Liberia		10.1	7.6	7.8	17.0	27.0	23.6	12.4	8.8	7.7
Libya	2.1	2.4	4.5	2.9	1.4	-2.2	13.2	25.8	25.9	10.4
Lithuania	0.7	9.1	19.7	4.7	1.2	2.3	2.7	3.7	0.9	-0.9
Luxembourg	2.1	3.7	6.3	2.5	0.8	1.7	1.5	1.7	0.3	0.5
Macau		0.5	1.0	0.0	0.8	2.8	3.0	1.2	2.4	4.6
Madagascar		9.9	8.2	5.8	4.2	5.6	8.6	8.6	6.0	7.4
Malawi	32.2	28.8	21.0	9.3	8.6	9.4	12.4	11.5	21.7	21.9
Malaysia	1.8	2.5	3.4	2.5	-1.1	0.7	0.9	3.9	2.1	2.1
Maldives	1.4	2.9	2.3	0.5	-1.4	0.2	-0.1	2.8	0.5	1.0
Mali	3.2	2.1	9.6	3.9	0.4	-1.7	0.3	1.8	-1.8	1.5
Malta	1.7	5.1	6.2	1.5	0.6	1.6	1.2	1.4	0.6	1.1
Mauritania	2.5	5.0	9.5	3.6	2.4	2.3	3.1	2.3	1.5	3.3
Mauritius	3.6	7.1	10.8	4.0	2.6	0.4	3.2	3.7	1.0	1.3
Mexico	4.7	5.5	7.9	5.7	3.4	3.6	4.9	6.0	2.8	2.7
Micronesia			5.4	3.2	0.6	1.9	1.5	0.6	-1.0	-0.3
Moldova	4.7	13.4	28.7	5.1	3.8	4.8	3.0	6.6	6.4	9.7
Mongolia	6.8	10.3	15.1	7.4	3.8	7.3	6.8	4.3	0.7	5.7
Montenegro	3.3	8.6	13.0	2.4	-0.3	0.4	2.6	2.4	-0.3	1.5
Morocco	1.0	6.1	6.7	1.4	0.7	0.3	1.8	0.8	1.6	1.6
Mozambique	4.1	7.1	10.3	6.4	3.5	2.8	3.9	15.1	17.4	3.6
Myanmar						8.8	6.9	4.6	6.9	9.5
Namibia	4.2	5.9	6.1	3.6	2.2	3.7	4.3	6.1	6.7	3.4
Nepal		7.1	7.7	4.1	5.1	5.6	4.1	3.6	8.8	7.9
Netherlands	3.3	3.8	10.0	2.7	1.3	2.6	1.7	1.4	0.3	0.6
New Caledonia									0.6	0.6
New Zealand	2.9	5.7	7.2	3.9	1.7	1.6	1.6	1.9	0.6	0.3
Nicaragua	4.6	8.4	10.5	4.9	3.7	5.4	4.9	3.9	3.5	4.0
Niger	9.1	3.7	4.2	3.8	2.9	-2.5	3.0	2.8	1.7	-0.6
Nigeria	33.2	24.7	18.8	17.0	13.2	11.4	12.1	16.5	15.7	9.0
North Macedonia	3.5	9.4	14.2	3.2	1.2	0.8	1.5	1.4	-0.2	-0.3
Norway	3.1	5.5	5.8	3.5	1.3	2.2	2.8	1.9	3.5	2.2
Oman		1.0	2.5	1.7	-0.4	0.5	0.9	1.6	1.1	0.1
Pakistan	12.6	30.8	19.9	9.5	9.7	10.6	5.1	4.1	3.8	2.5
Palau	2.2	12.8	12.4	2.6	0.2	0.3	2.1	1.4	-1.0	0.9
Palestine	53.7	5.9	3.7	1.2	-0.7	1.6	-0.2	0.2	-0.2	1.4
Panama	0.7	1.5	2.9	1.6	-1.6	-0.4	0.8	0.9	0.7	0.1
Papua New Guinea	0.6	2.3	5.3	4.5	4.9	3.9	4.4	5.4	6.7	6.0
Paraguay	3.8	4.6	9.8	4.8	1.8	2.8	4.0	3.6	4.1	3.1
Peru	2.0	6.5	8.3	4.3	2.0	2.3	1.5	3.0	3.6	3.4
Philippines	3.2	6.0	5.8	3.9	2.4	2.4	5.3	2.9	1.3	0.7
Poland	3.8	11.5	14.4	5.1	3.4	2.2	1.8	2.1	-0.7	-0.9
Portugal	2.4	4.3	7.8	1.3	-0.0	0.3	1.0	1.4	0.6	0.5
Qatar	1.3	3.0	5.0	2.3	-2.5	-0.7	0.3	0.4	2.7	1.8
Republic of the Congo	3.1	4.3	3.0	1.7	1.8	2.2	1.2	0.5	3.2	3.2
Romania	5.7	10.4	13.8	5.1	2.6	3.8	4.6	1.3	-1.5	-0.6
Russia				6.7	3.4	4.5	2.9	3.7	7.0	15.5
Rwanda	1.8	19.8	17.7	-0.4	9.9	3.3	-0.3	8.3	7.2	2.5
Saint Kitts and Nevis		3.6	2.7	1.2	-1.2	-0.3	-1.0	0.7	-0.7	-2.3
Saint Lucia	-0.1	4.1	6.4	2.4	-1.8	0.5	1.9	0.1	-3.1	-1.0
Samoa	2.2	7.9	11.0	3.1	-1.6	1.0	4.2	1.7	1.3	0.7
San Marino	1.2	5.9	5.3	1.6	-0.1	0.5	1.2	1.0	0.6	0.1
Saudi Arabia	1.7	2.3	2.5	3.1	3.4	-2.1	2.5	-0.8	2.1	1.2
Senegal	0.8	5.9	9.7	2.2	2.5	1.8	0.5	1.3	0.8	0.1
Serbia	4.7	12.4	12.0	4.1	1.6	1.8	2.0	3.1	1.1	1.4
Seychelles	0.3	-1.0	2.6	9.8	1.2	1.8	3.7	2.9	-1.0	4.0
Sierra Leone	28.6	47.6	27.2	11.9	13.4	14.8	16.0	18.2	10.9	6.7
Singapore	2.4	4.8	6.1	2.3	-0.2	0.6	0.4	0.6	-0.5	-0.5
Sint Maarten								2.2	0.1	0.3
Slovakia	2.8	10.5	12.8	3.1	1.9	2.7	2.5	1.3	-0.5	-0.3
Slovenia	2.0	7.4	8.8	1.9	-0.1	1.6	1.7	1.4	-0.1	-0.5
Solomon Islands		5.9	5.5	-0.1	3.0	1.6	3.5	0.5	0.5	-0.6
South Africa	4.4	6.1	7.0	4.6	3.2	4.1	4.5	5.2	6.6	4.5
South Korea	2.3	3.6	5.1	2.5	0.5	0.4	1.5	1.9	1.0	0.7
South Sudan	91.4	2.4	-6.7	10.5	29.7	87.2	83.5	187.9	380.0	52.8
Spain	2.8	3.5	8.4	3.1	-0.3	0.7	1.7	2.0	-0.2	-0.5
Sri Lanka	-0.4	16.5	49.7	7.0	6.2	3.5	2.1	7.7	4.0	3.8
St. Vincent and Grenadines	3.6	4.6	5.7	1.6	-0.6	0.9	2.3	2.2	-0.1	-1.7
Sudan			138.8	359.1	163.3	51.0	63.3	32.4	17.8	16.9
Suriname	16.2	51.6	52.4	59.1	34.9			22.0	55.4	6.9
Sweden	2.8	8.5	8.4	2.2	0.5	1.8	2.0	1.8	1.0	-0.0
Switzerland	1.1	2.1	2.8	0.6	-0.7	0.4	0.9	0.5	-0.4	-1.1
Syria						13.4	0.9	18.1	47.7	38.5
São Tomé and Príncipe	14.4	21.3	18.0	8.1	9.8	7.7	7.9	5.7	5.4	5.2
Tajikistan									6.0	5.7
Tanzania	3.1	3.8	4.4	3.7	3.3	3.5	3.5	5.3	5.2	5.6
Thailand	1.4	8.5	-1.6	1.2	-0.8	0.7	1.1	0.7	0.2	-0.9
The Gambia	11.6	17.0	11.5	7.4	5.9	7.1	6.5	8.0	7.2	6.8
Togo	2.9	5.3	7.6	4.6	1.8	0.7	0.9	-1.0	1.3	2.6
Tonga	3.2	6.4	11.0	5.6	-0.3	1.2	5.0	7.5	2.6	-1.1
Trinidad and Tobago	0.5	4.6	5.8	2.1	0.6	1.0	1.0	1.9	3.1	4.7
Tunisia	7.2	9.3	8.3	5.7	5.6	6.7	7.3	5.3	3.6	4.4
Turkey	58.5	53.9	72.3	19.6	12.3	15.2	16.3	11.1	7.8	7.7
Uganda	3.3	5.4	7.2	2.2	3.3	2.9	2.6	5.2	5.7	5.6
Ukraine	6.5	12.8	20.2	9.4	2.7	7.9	11.0	14.4	13.9	48.7
United Arab Emirates	1.7	1.6	5.3	0.2	-2.1	-1.9	3.1	2.0	1.6	4.1
United Kingdom	3.3	6.8	7.9	2.5	1.0	1.7	2.3	2.6	1.0	0.4
United States of America	2.9	4.1	8.0	4.7	1.2	1.8	2.4	2.1	1.3	0.1
Uruguay	4.8	5.9	9.1	7.7	9.8	7.9	7.6	6.2	9.6	8.7
Uzbekistan	9.6	10.0	11.4	10.8	12.9	14.5	17.5	13.9	8.1	8.8
Vanuatu		11.2	6.7	2.3	5.3	2.8	2.3	3.1	0.8	2.5
Venezuela									254.9	121.7
Vietnam	3.6	3.3	3.2	1.8	3.2	2.8	3.5	3.5	2.7	0.6
Zambia	15.0	10.9	11.0	22.0	15.7	9.2	7.5	6.6	17.9	10.1
Zimbabwe			104.7	98.5	557.2	255.3	10.6	0.9	-1.5	-2.4

== See also ==
- Consumer price index by country
- Inflation targeting
- List of sovereign states by central bank interest rates
