= Jeffrey M. Lacker =

American economist

Jeffrey Lacker
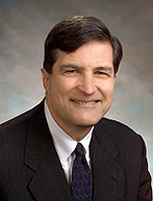

President of the Federal Reserve Bank of Richmond
- In office August 1, 2004 – April 4, 2017
- Preceded by: J. Alfred Broaddus
- Succeeded by: Thomas Barkin

Personal details
- Born: September 27, 1955 (age 71) Lexington, Kentucky, U.S.
- Education: Franklin and Marshall College (BA); University of Wisconsin, Madison (MA, PhD)

Jeffrey M. Lacker (born September 27, 1955) is an American economist and was president of the Federal Reserve Bank of Richmond until April 4, 2017. He was a Distinguished Professor in the Department of Economics at the Virginia Commonwealth University School of Business in Richmond, Virginia.

== Early years ==
Lacker was born in Lexington, Kentucky, and grew up in Ridgewood, New Jersey. He received his bachelor's degree in economics from Franklin and Marshall College in 1977. Following graduation, he joined Wharton Econometric Forecasting Associates in Philadelphia. He went on to earn a Ph.D. in economics from the University of Wisconsin–Madison in 1984. He was an assistant professor of economics at the Krannert School of Management at Purdue University from 1984 to 1989.

== Career at Federal Reserve ==
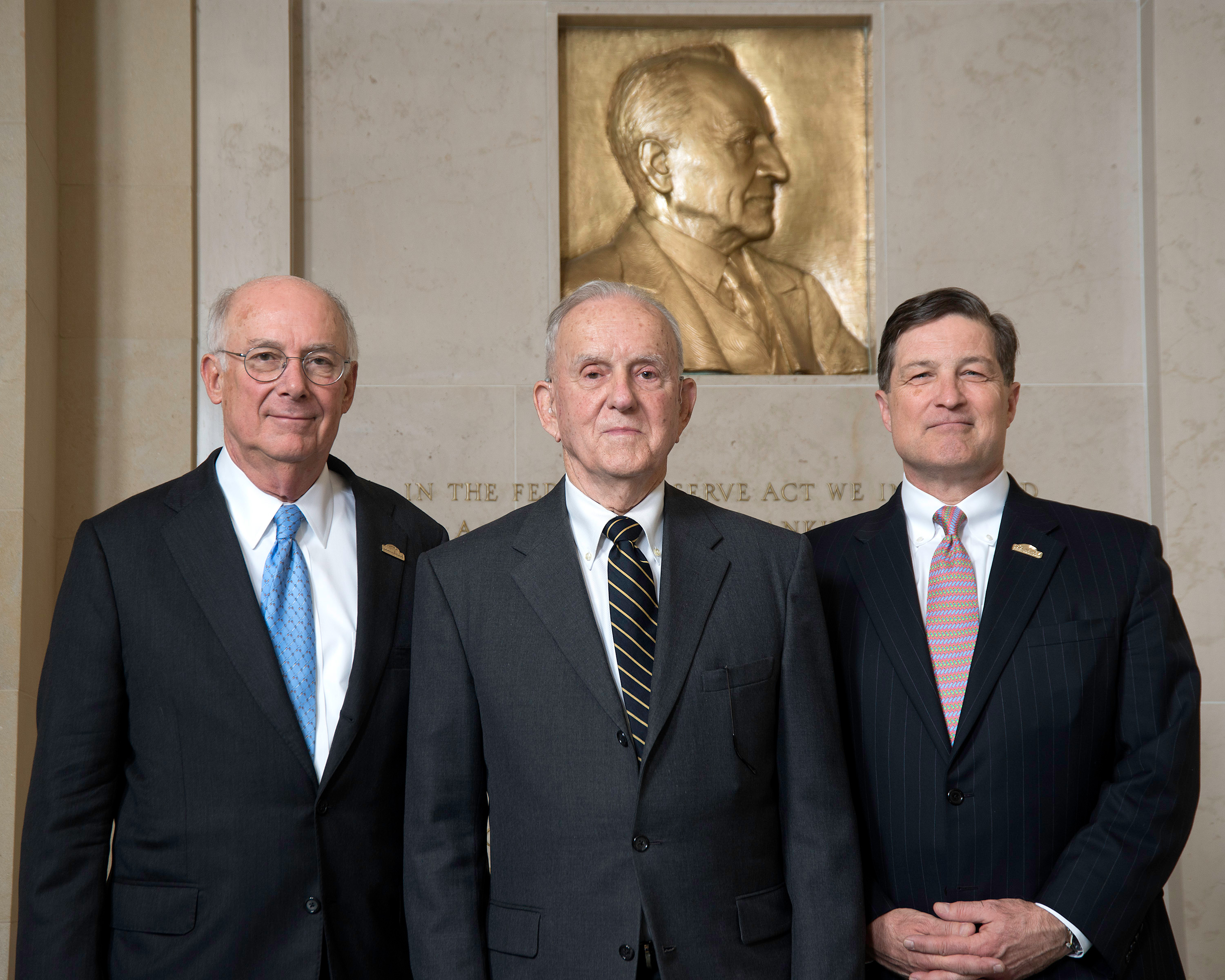
Lacker (right) with Richmond Fed Presidents J. Alfred Broaddus (left) and Robert P. Black (center)

Lacker joined the Federal Reserve Bank of Richmond in 1989 as an economist in the banking area of the Research Department. He was named research officer in 1994, vice president in 1996, and senior vice president and director of the Research Department in May 1999.

Lacker took office on August 1, 2004, as the seventh chief executive of the Fifth District Federal Reserve Bank at Richmond. He served the remainder of a term that began on March 1, 2001. He served as a voting member of the Federal Open Market Committee, bringing his district's perspective to policy discussions in Washington.

Lacker's vote was the solitary dissent in the August, September, October, and December 2006 Federal Open Market Committee (FOMC) meetings. The FOMC decided to keep interest rates steady at 5.25 percent after a series of seventeen consecutive increases of twenty-five basis points each, while Lacker voted for additional tightening. At the January 2009 meeting, "Mr. Lacker dissented because he preferred to expand the monetary base by purchasing U.S. Treasury securities rather than through targeted credit programs", according to the FOMC minutes.

In addition Lacker voted against the action at April 2012 meeting: "... who does not anticipate that economic conditions are likely to warrant exceptionally low levels of the federal funds rate through late 2014", according to FOMC press release. He cast the sole vote against quantitative easing by the purchase of mortgage-backed securities and the issuance of forward guidance at the September 2012 FOMC meeting.

When the Fed met in September 2015, Lacker issued the only vote in favor of increasing interest rates. His was the first such dissenting vote from the committee all year. He was termed "a maverick" in a February 2017 Richmond Times-Dispatch cover story in the RTD Metro Business section. Previously in 2017, the Richmond Times-Dispatch announced that Lacker would retire on October 1, 2017.

On April 4, 2017, Lacker abruptly resigned his post, admitting that he spoke to a Medley Global Advisors financial analyst about confidential Fed deliberations in 2012, and also "failed to disclose the details of the conversation even when he was questioned directly in an internal investigation." The Fed, Commodity Futures Trading Commission, and U.S. Attorney's Office all investigated the leak, but no charges were brought against any person. Lacker's attorney said that Lacker had cooperated with the Justice Department and that he was "informed that no charges will be brought and that the investigation as to him is complete."

On August 14, 2018, the Virginia Commonwealth University School of Business in Richmond, Virginia announced that Lacker had been appointed Distinguished Professor in the Department of Economics.

== Other activities ==
Lacker is the author of numerous articles in professional journals on monetary, financial, and payment economics, and has presented his work at several universities and central banks. He taught at The College of William and Mary in 1992 and 1993, and in 1997 he was a visiting scholar at the Swiss National Bank. He is the author of From Real Bills to Too Big to Fail: H. Parker Willis and the Fed's First Century.

Lacker is a member of the advisory board of Side by Side, and is a director of the Council for Economic Education and the World Affairs Council of Greater Richmond. He serves on the University of Richmond board of trustees.

== Personal life ==
Jeffrey Lacker was born in Lexington, Kentucky, the son of William Ralph Lacker and Marion Pharis Spears ("Mern") Lacker. He and his wife, Lisa Halberstadt, daughter of Jack Halberstadt and Elaine Greenberg Halberstadt, have two sons, Benjamin and Daniel.

Other offices
Preceded by J. Alfred Broaddus	President of the Federal Reserve Bank of Richmond; 2004–2017	Succeeded by Thomas Barkin
