= Consumer price index by country =

Consumer price index for year 2024 in %, relative to 2010: 100 to 110 110 to 120 120 to 130 130 to 140 140 to 150 / 150 to 200 200 to 300 300 to 1000 above 1000 no data

This page lists details of the consumer price index by country.

== By country ==
=== Belgium ===
The Belgian Consumer Price Index is a list of prices of goods and services, kept by the Belgian Federal Public Service Economy. The Index is updated on a monthly basis, and reflects the evolution in the cost of living. The Belgian system tracks two indices: the general Consumer Price Index and the Health Index. The latter uses the same basket of goods/products as the former, with the exception of products which could be detrimental to health, such as cigarettes and petrol.

Many wages, pensions, property rental costs, insurance premiums, unemployment benefits, health insurance payments, etc. are by law tied to the Health Index. Some wages and benefits are adapted to the Index after a rise of the Index above a certain threshold. Other adjustments, like house rent or insurance premiums, are carried through on a yearly basis. Thus, the income of the average Belgian closely tracks overall inflation - which makes it different from the rest of the eurozone.

Government cabinets can decide to "jump" the index, i.e. knowingly skip the automatic adaptation of all wages and benefits tied to the index. This is a political decision that keeps these wages and benefits on the then-current level, in order to reduce the government's budget deficit. The Wilfried Martens government in the 1980s did three such "index jumps", and the Michel I Government did one as well in 2015.

CPI All-Item Basket in Canada from 1980 to 2021. Source: Statistics Canada

=== Canada ===
Canada's CPI is published by Statistics Canada. The index is calculated and published monthly. It is used to escalate a given dollar value, over time, to preserve the purchasing power of that value. Thus, the CPI is widely used to adjust contracted payments, such as wages, rents, leases and child or spousal support allowances. Private and public pension programs (Old Age Security and the Canada Pension Plan), personal income tax deductions, and some government social payments are also escalated using the CPI. It is also used to set and monitor the implementation of economic policy. The Bank of Canada, for example, uses the CPI, and special aggregates of the CPI, to monitor its monetary policies.

=== Eurozone ===
The European Central Bank publishes the Harmonised Index of Consumer Prices (HICP). It is a weighted average of price indices of member states. It is a seasonally adjusted chained index in which goods are split by final consumption. It is a consumer price index which is compiled according to a methodology that has been harmonised across EU countries. The euro area HICP is a weighted average of price indices of member states who have adopted the euro. The primary goal of the ECB is to maintain price stability, defined as keeping the year on year increase HICP target on 2% over the medium term. In order to do that, the ECB can control the short-term interest rate through Eonia, the European overnight index average, which affects market expectations. The HICP is also used to assess the convergence criteria on inflation which countries must fulfill in order to adopt the euro.

=== Finland ===
The index (kuluttajahintaindeksi) is calculated and published by Statistics Finland Finnish food prices have been increasing almost fastest in European Union. In the current year, consumer prices for food are forecast to increase by 4.5% on average. Most shopping centers have expensive underground car parking places that are often in practice free of charge. The high construction prices are included in the price of food and goods. The two biggest food retailers Kesko and S-Market (HOK Elanto) cover over 80% of the markets. Most often the town planning has ignored to plan new independent small shops. Satu Hassi (Green) has made a questionary for the EU Commission of the retail industry.

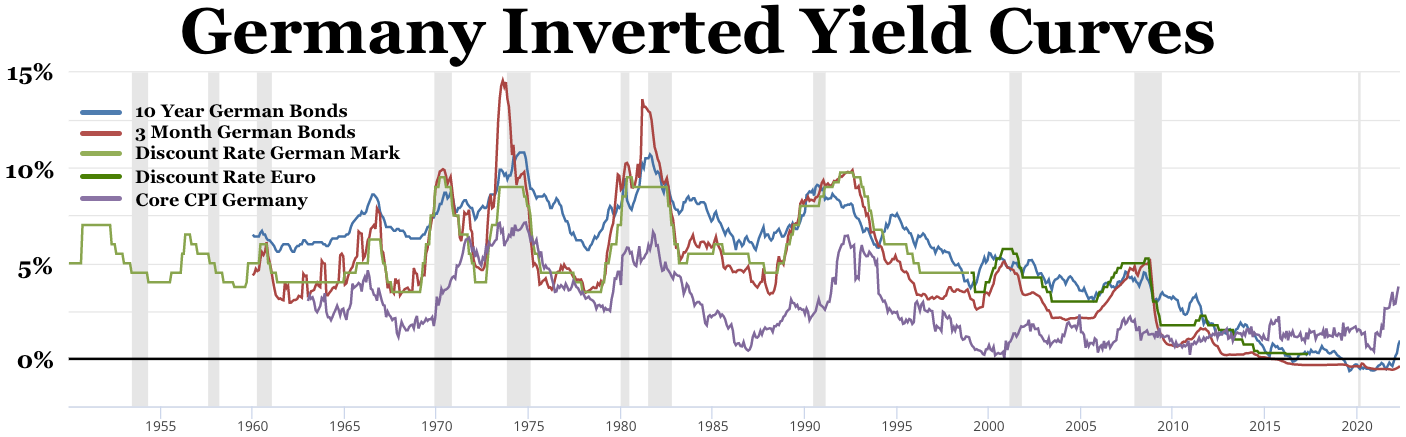
Germany inverted yield curves 10 year German Bonds 3 month German Bonds German Mark Discount Rate Euro Discount Rate - Euribor Consumer Price Index for Germany

=== Germany ===
The index is calculated and published by the Federal Statistical Office of Germany (Statistisches Bundesamt), yearly and monthly results are available from 1991 onwards.

=== Greece ===
The index is calculated and published by the Hellenic Statistical Authority, by using a variation of the Laspeures index. Until 2000, the index used to take into consideration only urban areas.

$R^{t,T}_h=R^{12,T-1}_h\left [ \frac{\sum_{1}^nW^T_i\frac{R^{t,T}_{h,i}}{R^{12,T-1}_{h,i}}}{\sum_{1}^nW^T_i} \right ]$
where:

- $R$: the Consumer Price Index.
- $R^{t,T}_h$: the CPI during this year, rounded at $h$ decimal places.
- $R^{12,T-1}_h$: the CPI in December ($t=12$) of the previous year ($T-1$), rounded at $h$ decimal places.
- $W^T_i$: the weighting factor.
- $R^{t,T}_{h,i}$: the individual index of the $i$-th product.
- $R^{12,T-1}_{h,i}$: the individual index of the $i$-th product in December of the previous year.

=== India ===
Wholesale Price Index (WPI) first published in 1902, and was one of the more economic indicators available to policy makers until it was replaced by most developed countries by the Consumer Price Index in the 1970s. WPI is the index that is used to measure the change in the average price level of goods traded in wholesale market. In India, a total of 697 commodities data on price level is tracked through WPI which is an indicator of movement in prices of commodities in all trade and transactions. It is also the price index which is available on a weekly basis with the shortest possible time lag only two weeks. Base year to calculate WPI is 2011-2012=100

Consumer Price Index (CPI) in India comprises multiple series classified based on different economic groups. There are four series, viz the CPI UNME (Urban Non-Manual Employee), CPI AL (Agricultural Labourer), CPI RL (Rural Labourer) and CPI IW (Industrial Worker). While the CPI UNME series is published by the Central Statistical Organisation, the others are published by the Department of Labour. From February 2011 the CPI (UNME) released by CSO is replaced as CPI (urban), CPI (rural) and CPI (combined). Consumer Price Index is used in calculation of Dearness Allowance which forms an integral part of salary of a Government Employee. Base year to calculate CPI is 2012=100.

=== Israel ===
Israeli's Central Bureau of Statistics publishes a series of consumer and other (manufacturing, agricultural, housing, etc.) price indices every month. Both current and historical data are available on their web site, which also includes a convenient calculator that allows visitors to enter starting and ending dates and retrieve the monthly data in HTML or Microsoft Excel spreadsheet format.

=== South Africa ===
The consumer price index is the official measure of inflation in South Africa, compiled and published by Statistics South Africa (Stats SA). It is a key economic indicator used by the South African Reserve Bank (SARB) for its inflation targeting policy. The SARB's official target range for headline inflation is 3% to 6%. Since 2017, the bank has focused on anchoring inflation expectations at the 4.5% midpoint of this range.

=== United Kingdom ===
The UK's CPI, 1988 to 2015. 2005=100

The traditional measure of inflation in the UK for many years was the Retail Prices Index (the RPI), which was first calculated in the early 20th century to evaluate the extent to which workers were affected by price changes during the first world war. An explicit inflation target was first set in October 1992 by then-Chancellor of the Exchequer Norman Lamont following the departure of the UK from the Exchange Rate Mechanism. Initially, the target was based on the RPIX, which is the RPI calculated excluding mortgage interest payments. This was felt to be a better measure of the effectiveness of macroeconomic policy. It was argued that if interest rates are used to curb inflation, then including mortgage payments in the inflation measure would be misleading. Until 1997, interest rates were set by the Treasury.

On winning power in May 1997, the New Labour government handed control over interest rates to the Bank of England, whose Monetary Policy Committee now sets rates on the basis of an inflation target set by the Chancellor. If in any month inflation is more than one percentage point off its target, the Governor of the Bank of England is required to write to the Chancellor explaining why. Mervyn King became the first Governor to do so in April 2007, when inflation ran at 3.1% against a target 2%.

Since 1996 the United Kingdom has also tracked a Consumer Price Index (CPI) figure, and in December 2003 its inflation target was changed to one based on the CPI normally set at 2%. Both the CPI and the RPI are published monthly by the Office for National Statistics. Some rates are linked to the CPI, others to the RPI. For example, rail fare increases are usually linked to the RPI; government index-linked National Savings Certificates were originally linked to the RPI, then changed to the lower CPI (and ultimately discontinued).

=== United States ===
CPI-U starting from 1913; Source: U.S. Department Of Labor

Annual inflation (and deflation), 1914–2007

In the US, CPI figures are prepared monthly by the Bureau of Labor Statistics of the United States Department of Labor.

The CPI-U includes expenditures by all urban consumers. The CPI-W includes expenditures by consumer units with clerical workers, sales workers, craft workers, operative, service workers, or laborers. The Chained Consumer Price Index C-CPI-U, a chained index, has been introduced. The C-CPI-U tries to mitigate the substitution bias that is encountered in CPI-W and CPI-U by employing a Tornqvist formula and utilizing expenditure data in adjacent time periods in order to reflect the effect of any substitution that consumers make across item categories in response to changes in relative prices. The new measure, called a "superlative" index, is designed to be a closer approximation to a "cost-of-living" index than the other measures. The use of expenditure data for both a base period and the current period in order to average price change across item categories distinguishes the C-CPI-U from the existing CPI measures, which use only a single expenditure base period to compute the price change over time. In 1999, the BLS introduced a geometric mean estimator for averaging prices within most of the index's item categories in order to approximate the effect of consumers' responses to changes in relative prices within these item categories. The geometric mean estimator is used in the C-CPI-U in the same item categories in which it is now used in the CPI-U and CPI-W.

The CPI has powerful political ramifications, and administrations of both parties have been tempted to change the basis for its calculation. Especially since 1980, the definition of CPI has been altered repeatedly, though economists disagree whether the index underestimates or overestimates the true rate of decline in purchasing power.

There are major research in progress: continuing research on technical improvements in the calculation of the CPI, and continuing work on the next major weight revision of the CPI. In 1996, the Boskin Commission found the CPI to be a biased measure, and gave a quantitative analysis of the bias. The Boskin critique helped to spur some changes in the U.S. CPI, although it was partially disputed by the BLS. Many of the changes were aimed at moving the CPI to a cost of living model which takes consumer substitutions into account and typically reduces the reported level of inflation.

== Statistics ==
Consumer price index (CPI) for year 2024 in % relative to 2010 is shown in below table by country.

Country / territory	CPI in %	Year	Publisher	Frequency
Afghanistan	168.5	2024		
Albania	141.1	2024		
Algeria	206.6	2024		
Angola	1032.3	2024		
Antigua and Barbuda	142.2	2024		
Armenia	155.7	2024		
Aruba	109.5	2019		
Argentina	–	–	National Institute of Statistics and Census of Argentina	Monthly and annually
Australia	144.3	2024	Australian Bureau of Statistics	Quarterly
Austria	148.2	2024	Statistik Austria	
Azerbaijan	217.7	2024		
Bahamas	130.7	2024		
Bahrain	120.7	2024		
Bangladesh	262.0	2024		
Barbados	170.1	2024		
Belarus	751.6	2024		
Belgium	142.2	2024	Federal Public Service Economy	Monthly
Belize	125.7	2024		
Benin	122.2	2024		
Bhutan	218.0	2024		
Bolivia	165.4	2024		
Bosnia and Herzegovina	130.2	2024		
Botswana	197.4	2024		
Brazil	223.2	2024		
Brunei Darussalam	106.4	2024		
Bulgaria	155.4	2024		
Burkina Faso	137.3	2024		
Burundi	384.1	2024		
Cabo Verde	128.1	2024		
Cambodia	148.3	2023		
Cameroon	148.2	2024		
Canada	138.1	2024	Statistics Canada	Monthly
Cayman Islands	102.9	2016		
Central African Republic	175.0	2023		
Chad	155.8	2024		
Chile	178.0	2024	Instituto Nacional de Estadística de Chile	
China	132.5	2024	National Bureau of Statistics of China	
Colombia	196.3	2024	Banco de la República de Colombia	Monthly
Comoros	103.6	2013		
Costa Rica	143.1	2024		
Croatia	138.9	2024	Croatian Bureau of Statistics	
Curaçao	115.5	2019		
Cyprus	119.2	2024		
Czech Republic	162.8	2024		
DR Congo	133.9	2016		
Denmark	127.3	2024		
Djibouti	134.9	2024		
Dominica	121.0	2024		
Dominican Republic	174.9	2024		
East Timor	181.1	2024		
Ecuador	133.0	2024		
Egypt	623.8	2024		
El Salvador	129.0	2024		
Equatorial Guinea	136.4	2022		
Estonia	171.7	2024		
Eswatini	166.8	2019		
Ethiopia	1039.0	2024		
Fiji	144.0	2024		
Finland	133.1	2024	Statistics Finland	
France	126.5	2024		
Gabon	137.3	2024		
Georgia	178.6	2024		
Germany	134.9	2024	Federal Statistical Office of Germany	Yearly and monthly
Ghana	749.3	2024		
Greece	118.8	2024	Hellenic Statistical Authority	
Grenada	115.6	2024		
Guatemala	179.6	2024		
Guinea	421.6	2024		
Guinea-Bissau	141.7	2024		
Guyana	138.4	2024		
Haiti	710.6	2024		
Honduras	197.8	2024		
Hong Kong	145.1	2024	Census and Statistics Department	
Hungary	183.9	2024		
Iceland	172.8	2024	Statistics Iceland	
India	227.6	2024		
Indonesia	169.1	2023	Badan Pusat Statistik (BPS)	
Iran	2834.8	2024	Central Bank of Iran	
Iraq	139.8	2023		
Ireland	127.2	2024	Central Statistics Office Ireland	
Israel	122.4	2024	Central Bureau of Statistics	Monthly
Italy	129.9	2024	Istat	
Ivory Coast	135.3	2024		
Jamaica	224.2	2024		
Japan	114.4	2024		
Jordan	138.0	2024		
Kazakhstan	313.5	2024		
Kenya	257.4	2024		
Kiribati	121.1	2023		
Kosovo	145.5	2024		
Kuwait	148.2	2024		
Kyrgyzstan	233.7	2023		
Laos	294.4	2024		
Latvia	156.5	2024		
Lebanon	7751.1	2024		
Lesotho	212.0	2024		
Liberia	423.2	2023		
Libya	284.2	2024		
Lithuania	165.0	2024		
Luxembourg	133.9	2024		
Macau	147.5	2023		
Madagascar	241.5	2023		
Malawi	1023.0	2024		
Malaysia	132.8	2024	Department of Statistics Malaysia	Monthly
Maldives	144.6	2024		
Mali	131.0	2024		
Malta	131.4	2024		
Mauritania	168.7	2024		
Mauritius	170.3	2024		
Mexico	184.4	2024	National Institute on Statistics and Geography (INEGI)	Every 2 weeks or monthly
Micronesia	126.9	2022		
Moldova	277.0	2024		
Mongolia	296.0	2024		
Montenegro	151.3	2024		
Morocco	129.6	2024		
Mozambique	246.9	2024		
Myanmar	168.2	2019		
Namibia	195.9	2024		
Nauru	100.2	2012		
Nepal	238.1	2023		
Netherlands	142.3	2024	Statistics Netherlands	Monthly
New Caledonia	107.0	2016		
New Zealand	140.9	2024	Statistics New Zealand	Quarterly
Nicaragua	221.8	2024		
Niger	137.7	2024		
Nigeria	699.4	2024	National Bureau of Statistics (NBS)	Monthly
North Macedonia	153.1	2024		
Norway	145.1	2024	Statistics Norway	Monthly
Oman	119.4	2023		
Pakistan	386.8	2024	Government of Pakistan Statistics Division, Federal Bureau of Statistics.	
Palau	161.4	2024		
Palestine	190.8	2024		
Panama	128.4	2024		
Papua New Guinea	185.1	2024		
Paraguay	182.9	2024		
Peru	163.0	2024		
Philippines	159.7	2024		
Poland	164.2	2024	Główny Urząd Statystyczny (GUS)	
Portugal	129.0	2024		
Qatar	126.0	2024		
Republic of the Congo	143.1	2024		
Romania	177.2	2024		
Russia	199.4	2021		
Rwanda	237.2	2024		
Saint Kitts and Nevis	110.8	2023		
Saint Lucia	123.2	2024		
Samoa	146.0	2024		
San Marino	128.9	2024		
Saudi Arabia	134.6	2024		
Senegal	134.1	2024		
Serbia	200.5	2024		
Seychelles	147.1	2024		
Sierra Leone	718.0	2024		
Singapore	133.2	2024		
Sint Maarten	116.6	2017		
Slovakia	155.3	2024		
Slovenia	134.9	2024		
Solomon Islands	152.9	2023		
South Africa	203.4	2024	Statistics South Africa	
South Korea	132.2	2024		
South Sudan	41280.7	2024		
Spain	131.5	2024		
Sri Lanka	307.0	2024		
St. Vincent and Grenadines	127.9	2024		
Sudan	38796.6	2022		
Suriname	1698.8	2024		
Sweden	137.3	2024	Statistics Sweden	
Switzerland	105.5	2024	Swiss Federal Statistical Office	Monthly
Syria	614.9	2019		
São Tomé and Príncipe	387.4	2024		
Taiwan	–	–	National Statistics, Republic of China (Taiwan)	
Tajikistan	148.6	2016		
Tanzania	224.1	2024		
Thailand	123.0	2024		
The Gambia	285.9	2024		
Togo	140.6	2024		
Tonga	165.1	2024		
Trinidad and Tobago	163.6	2024		
Tunisia	220.2	2024		
Turkey	1322.9	2024		
Tuvalu	100.5	2011		
Uganda	216.9	2024		
Ukraine	457.1	2024		
United Arab Emirates	122.2	2024		
United Kingdom	147.4	2024		
United States	143.9	2024		
Uruguay	290.6	2024		
Uzbekistan	476.9	2024		
Vanuatu	149.8	2023		
Venezuela	2740.3	2016		
Vietnam	189.7	2024	General Statistics Office of Vietnam	
Yemen	157.6	2014		
Zambia	424.3	2024		
Zimbabwe	11076.6	2022	Reserve Bank of Zimbabwe	

== See also ==
- Government budget balance
- Inflation targeting
- List of countries by inflation rate
- List of sovereign states by central bank interest rates
