= Stephen H. Axilrod =

American writer

Stephen H. Axilrod was an American author who spent 30-plus years from 1952 to 1986 as a bureaucrat within the US Federal Reserve System before spending another 2 plus decades working in private markets in the U.S. and as a consultant to various developing and transitional countries abroad on monetary policy questions and related market and debt management issues. While at the US Fed, he was Staff Director for Monetary and Financial Policy and also Staff Director and Secretary of the Federal Open Market Committee, the Fed's principal monetary policy body.

== Works ==
He has written two books, The Federal Reserve: What Everyone Needs to Know, published by Oxford University Press (2013) and Inside the Fed: Monetary Policy and its Management, Martin through Greenspan to Bernanke, revised edition to take full account of great credit crisis published by MIT Press (2011 and 2013).

Stephen H. Axilrod, 95, died on March 17, 2022, surrounded by family at his home at Essex Meadows in Essex, Connecticut.

He graduated from Harvard College and the University of Chicago.
