= Federal Reserve Bank of Richmond =

Member Bank of Federal Reserve

Coordinates: 37°32′08″N 77°26′26″W

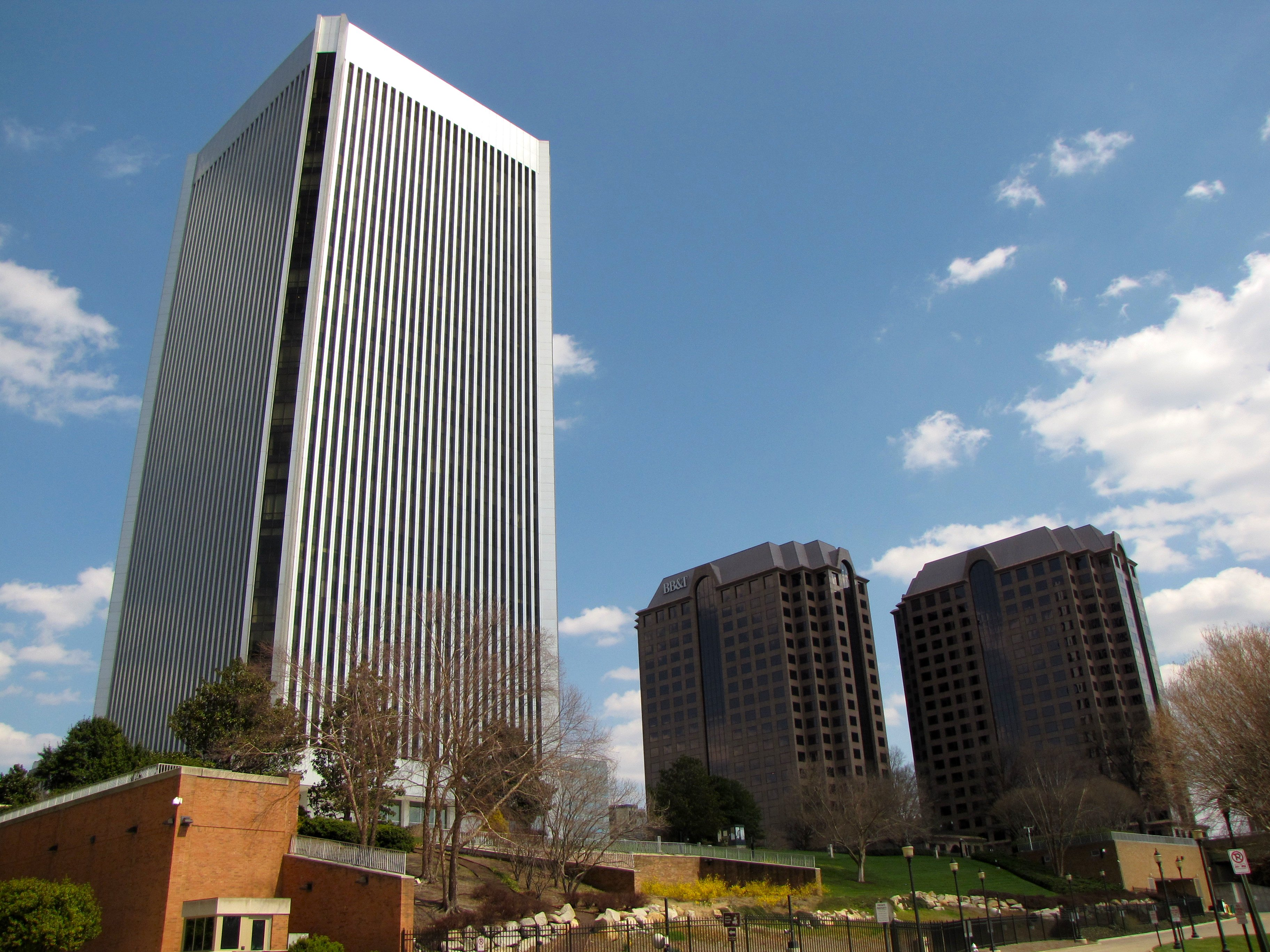
- The Federal Reserve Bank of Richmond (left) in 2013
- Central bank of: Fifth District: Washington, D.C.; Maryland; North Carolina; South Carolina; Virginia Parts of: West Virginia
- Headquarters: 701 E Byrd St; Richmond, Virginia, U.S.
- Established: May 18, 1914 (112 years ago)
- President: Thomas Barkin
- Website: richmondfed.org
- The Federal Reserve Bank of Richmond is one of 12 regional banks that make up the Federal Reserve System

The Federal Reserve Bank of Richmond is one of the twelve Federal Reserve Banks of the United States. It is responsible for the Fifth District of the Federal Reserve System, which encompasses the District of Columbia, Maryland, North Carolina, South Carolina, Virginia, and most of West Virginia (excluding the Northern Panhandle). The district is headquartered in Richmond and has branch offices in Baltimore and Charlotte. Since 2017, Thomas Barkin has been serving as the bank's chief executive officer and president.

== History and building ==
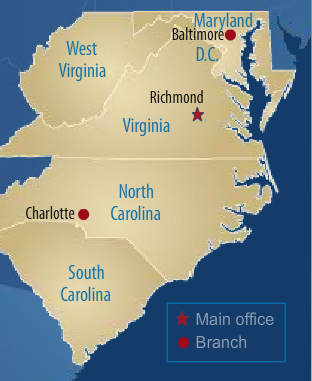
Fifth District of the Federal Reserve

The Federal Reserve Bank of Richmond has had three locations in downtown Richmond, Virginia. When it opened in 1914, it was located near the federal courts. From 1919 to 1921, a new building for the Federal Reserve was constructed at 100 North Ninth Street. The Fed offices existed here from 1921 until 1978, when they moved to their current location. The old 1921 Fed building is now used as the Supreme Court of Virginia, which moved to the location in 1978 from its former building at 1111 East Broad Street.

The current building, in the Central Office District, has an aluminum facade and was designed by Minoru Yamasaki, who also designed the former World Trade Center. Despite being one of the tallest buildings in the state, 49% of the building's total floor area is located underground. The building was proposed in 1972, and built from 1975 to 1978.

Thomas Barkin became president of the Richmond Fed following the retirement of Jeffrey M. Lacker in April 2017. The previous president, J. Alfred Broaddus, retired in 2004.

== Economy ==
The Federal Reserve Bank of Richmond is the fourth-largest Federal Reserve Bank by assets held, after New York, San Francisco, and Atlanta, as of December 2018.

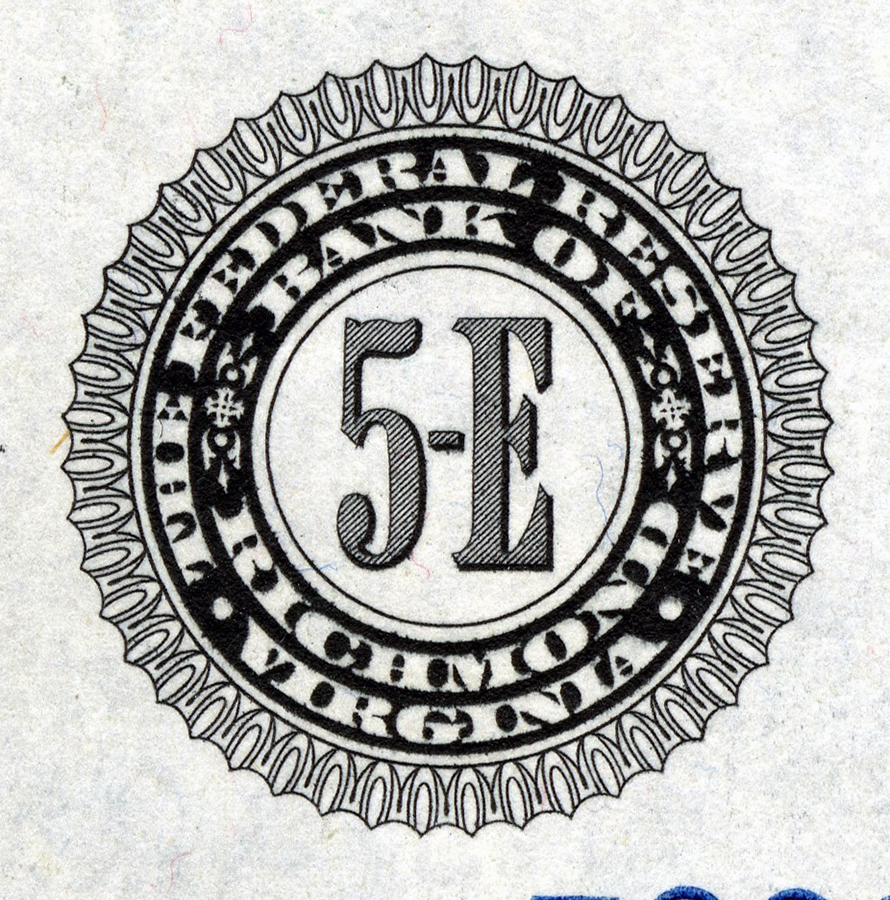
Federal Reserve Note Seal (Richmond)

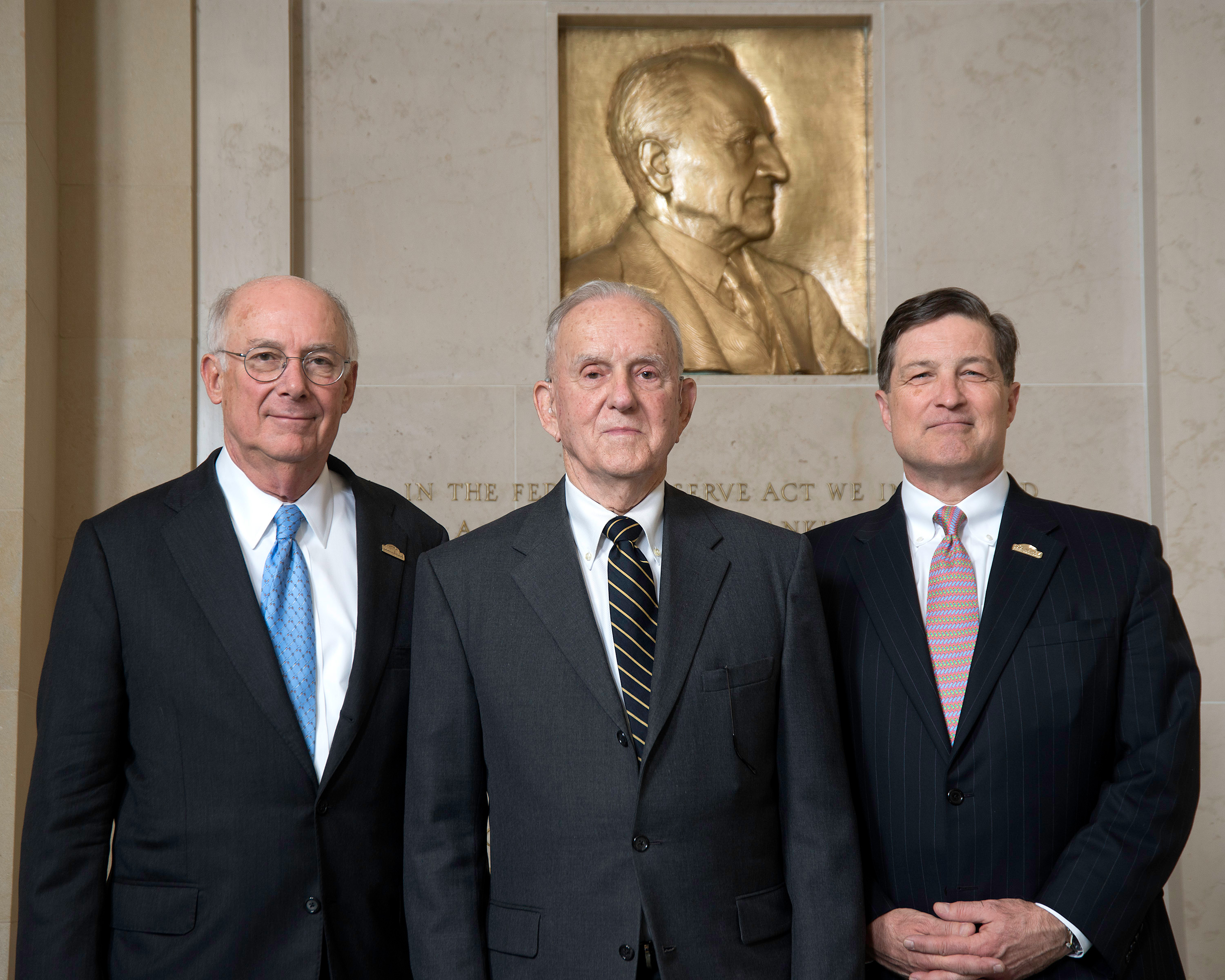
Former presidents of the Richmond Fed (Left to Right: J. Alfred Broaddus Jr.; Robert P. Black; Jeffrey M. Lacker)

== Branches ==
- Federal Reserve Bank of Richmond Baltimore Branch Office
- Federal Reserve Bank of Richmond Charlotte Branch Office

== Board of directors ==
The following people serve on the board of directors as of 2021:

=== Class A ===
Name	Title	Term expires on December 31
Jennifer LaClair	Chief Financial Officer; Ally Bank; Charlotte, North Carolina	2023
James H. Sills, III	President and chief executive officer Mechanics and Farmers Bank; Durham, North Carolina	2024
Alice P. Frazier	President and chief executive officer Bank of Charles Town; Charles Town, West Virginia	2025

=== Class B ===
Name	Title	Term expires on December 31
Robert M. Blue	President and chief executive officer Dominion Energy; Richmond, Virginia	2023
Nazzic Keene	Chief executive officer SAIC; Reston, Virginia	2021
Wayne A. I. Frederick	President; Howard University; Washington, D.C.	2025

=== Class C ===
Name	Title	Term expires on December 31
Lisa M. Hamilton (vice chair)	President and chief executive officer The Annie E. Casey Foundation; Baltimore, Maryland	2023
Halsey M. Cook	President and chief executive officer Milliken & Company; Spartanburg, South Carolina	2024
Jodie McLean (chair)	Chief Executive Officer; EDENS; Washington, D.C.	2025

== See also ==
- Federal Reserve Districts
- Federal Reserve Branches
- Federal Reserve Bank of Richmond Baltimore Branch Office
- Federal Reserve Bank of Richmond Charlotte Branch Office
- Federal Reserve System
- Federal Reserve Act
- Structure of the Federal Reserve System
