= Max Wellborn =

American politician (1862–1957)

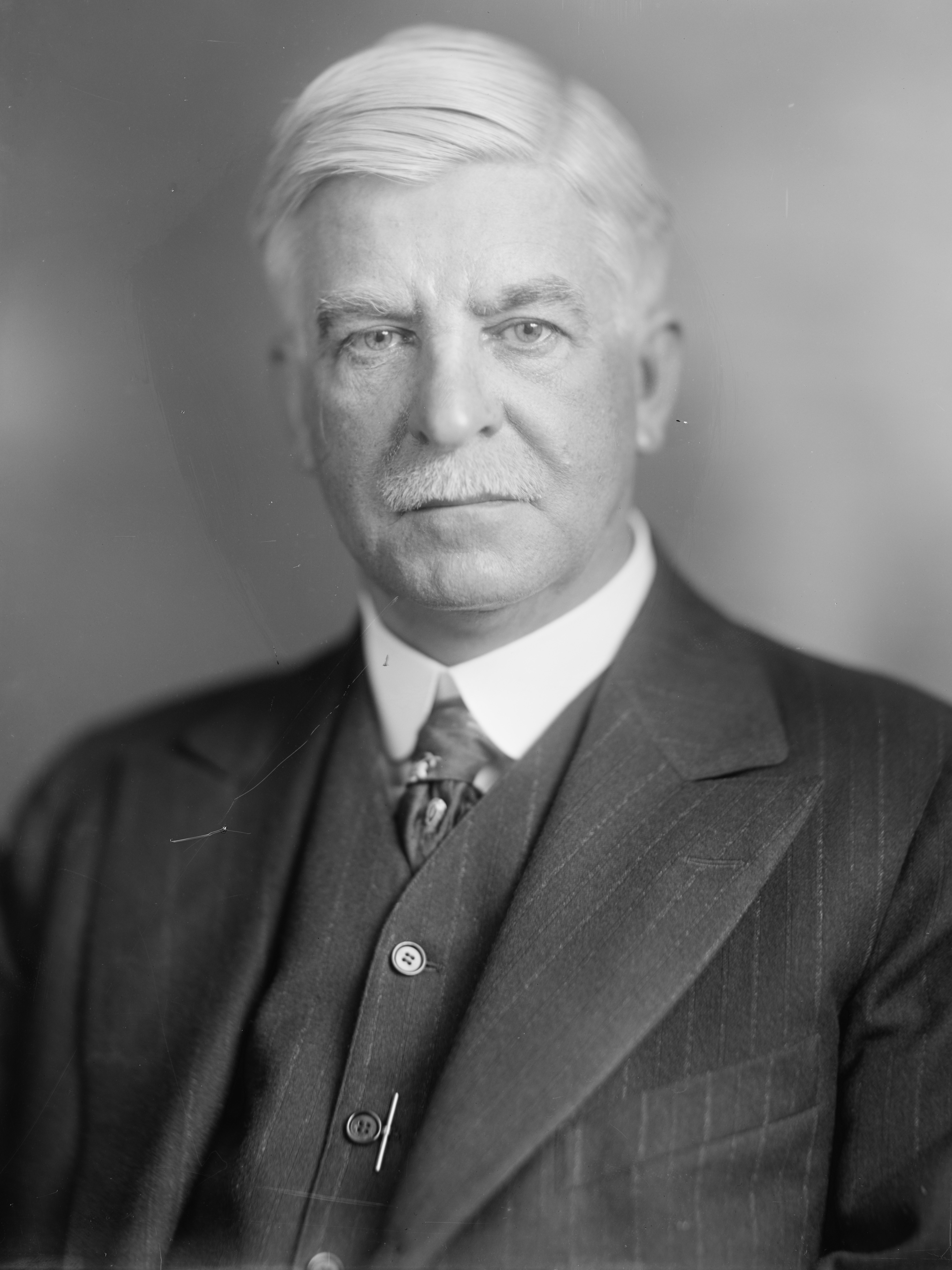

President of the Federal Reserve Bank of Atlanta
- In office March 1, 1919 – January 1, 1928
- Preceded by: Joseph McCord
- Succeeded by: Eugene Robert Black

Personal details
- Born: Maximilian Bethune Wellborn; January 22, 1862 Lewisville, Arkansas, U.S.
- Died: November 28, 1957 (aged 95) Anniston, Alabama, U.S.

Maximilian Bethune Wellborn (January 22, 1862, in Lewisville, Arkansas – November 28, 1957, in Anniston, Alabama) was the first chairman of the board and a governor of the Federal Reserve Bank of Atlanta. He also served as a county commissioner and state senator from Calhoun County, Alabama. Wellborn was a banker and also involved in the railroad, real estate and insurance businesses.

== Early life ==
His family had longtime roots in Eufaula, Alabama and Charleston, South Carolina. He was born during the American Civil War in Arkansas and reared in Eufaula. As a young man he moved to Anniston and participated in the town's rapid growth during the ensuing years.

== Business career ==
Wellborn was a self-taught businessman. He learned to be a banker from experience and as the first bank he started became successful, he not only expanded his efforts in the banking business(starting five separate banks) and becoming the longtime chairman of the First National Bank of Anniston, but he entered the railroad, real estate, and insurance businesses as well.

== The Federal Reserve ==
After a protracted political struggle, the act creating the Federal Reserve System was finally signed into law late in 1913. President Woodrow Wilson appointed Max Wellborn to be the first chairman of the Atlanta Federal Reserve bank. Wellborn served in this capacity until 1919 when he accepted the appointment of governor of the bank, a position he held until 1927 when he retired. His daughter-in-law's father, Eugene R. Black, was his hand-picked successor as governor.

== Political career ==
Prior to his service with the Federal Reserve, he had served as a commissioner in Calhoun County, Alabama and had been a delegate to the Democratic national convention of 1912. Wellborn returned to Alabama from Atlanta in 1928, retiring to his farm outside of Anniston. In 1934 he decided to run for the Alabama State Senate and was elected from Calhoun County. He served until 1937 when he did not seek re-election.

== Family ==
Max Wellborn's family had long be involved in public service. He was a student of his heritage and presented many of his family papers to Auburn University, including those of naval hero Commodore John H. Dent, his great grandfather.

Other offices
Preceded by Joseph McCord	President of the Federal Reserve Bank of Atlanta; 1919–1928	Succeeded by Eugene Robert Black
