= Nashville Historic District =

Nashville Historic District may refer to:

- Nashville Historic District (Nashua, New Hampshire), listed on the NRHP in New Hampshire
- Nashville Historic District (Nashville, North Carolina), listed on the NRHP in North Carolina
- East Nashville Historic District, Nashville, Tennessee, listed on the NRHP in Tennessee
- Nashville Financial Historic District, Nashville, Tennessee, listed on the NRHP in Tennessee
