= Dennis P. Lockhart =

Dennis Lockhart

14th President of the Federal Reserve Bank of Atlanta
- In office March 1, 2007 – February 28, 2017
- Preceded by: Jack Guynn
- Succeeded by: Raphael Bostic

Personal details
- Born: February 1, 1947 (age 79) Bakersfield, California, U.S.
- Education: Stanford University (BA); Johns Hopkins University (MA)

Dennis P. Lockhart (born February 1, 1947) is an American economist. He was the 14th President and CEO of the Federal Reserve Bank of Atlanta, serving from March 1, 2007, through February 28, 2017.

== Education ==
Lockhart earned a B.A. in political science and economics from Stanford University in 1968 and an M.A. in international economics and U.S. foreign policy from Johns Hopkins University's School of Advanced International Studies in 1971. He served as a lieutenant in the U.S. Marine Corps Reserve from 1968 to 1974.

== Financial career ==
Lockhart held various positions, both domestic and international, with Citicorp/Citibank (now Citigroup) between 1971 and 1988. Early in his career with Citibank, he served in Saudi Arabia, Greece and Iran. From 1978 to 1986, he served in Atlanta as senior corporate officer of the Southeast office of Citibank.

From 1987 to 1988, he was head of the firm's Latin American debt-to-equity swap investment program, designed to restructure sovereign debt. He worked for thirteen years (1988-2001) at Heller Financial, where he served as executive vice president and director of the parent company and as president of Heller International Group until Heller was purchased by General Electric in 2001.

From 2001 to 2003, he was managing partner at the private equity firm Zephyr Management, L.P., based in New York with activity in Africa and Latin America. From 2002 to 2007, he served as chairman of the Small Enterprise Assistance Funds, a sponsor/operator of emerging markets venture capital/private equity funds. In 2000, he served as chairman of the advisory committee of the U.S. Export-Import Bank.

Lockhart serves on the board of directors and executive committee of the Metro Atlanta Chamber of Commerce, on the board of directors of St. Joseph's Health System, and is a trustee of Agnes Scott College and the Atlanta International School. He also chairs the World Affairs Council of Atlanta and the Midtown Alliance.

== Academic career ==
From 2003 to 2007, Lockhart served on the faculty of the Master of Science in Foreign Service Program at Georgetown University's Walsh School of Foreign Service. In this role, Lockhart was chairman of the program's concentrations in international business-government relations and global commerce and finance, while teaching courses in international investment, global business strategy, and other subjects. He also was an adjunct professor at Johns Hopkins University's School of Advanced International Studies.

== See also ==
- Federal Reserve System
- Federal Reserve Bank of Atlanta

Other offices
Preceded by Jack Guynn	President of the Federal Reserve Bank of Atlanta; 2007–2017	Succeeded by Raphael Bostic
