= Federal Reserve Bank of Atlanta Nashville Branch =

One of the five Federal Reserve Bank of Atlanta branch offices

Agency overview
- Jurisdiction: Sixth Federal Reserve District
- Headquarters: 333 Commerce Street, Suite 1000; Nashville, Tennessee 37201
- Parent agency: Federal Reserve Bank of Atlanta
- Website: www.atlantafed.org/who-we-are/visit/nashville-branch

The Federal Reserve Bank of Atlanta Nashville Branch Office is one of the five branch offices of the Federal Reserve Bank of Atlanta. The Nashville branch is part of the Sixth Federal Reserve District and serves the Middle and East Tennessee region. The branch currently operates from leased commercial office space at 333 Commerce Street in downtown Nashville.

Federal Reserve System Sixth District

== History ==
The Nashville branch opened in 1919, the last of the original four branches established in the Sixth Federal Reserve District, following the New Orleans branch (1915) and the Birmingham and Jacksonville branches (both 1918).

A purpose-built facility at 226 Third Avenue North was completed and dedicated in December 1922, designed by Nashville architectural firm Marr & Holman in association with Atlanta architect A. Ten Eyck Brown. The building, constructed in the Classical Revival style with four limestone Ionic columns and a pedimented portico, was located in downtown Nashville's financial district, then known as the "Wall Street of the South." The branch occupied the Third Avenue building until 1958, when it relocated to a new facility on Eighth Avenue North (now Rosa L. Parks Boulevard). In the 1950s, growing check volumes across the Sixth District had prompted the construction of new branch facilities in Nashville, Birmingham, and Jacksonville.

== Historic building ==
The former Nashville Branch building at 226 Third Avenue North was listed on the National Register of Historic Places in 1984. Designed in the Classical Revival style, it is considered one of the finest examples of that style in Nashville and is a contributing structure within the Nashville Financial Historic District. The building was sold in 2018 to Nashville entrepreneur Bill Miller.

== Board of directors ==
The Nashville Branch board of directors has seven members: four appointed by the Atlanta board of directors, and three appointed by the Board of Governors. Branch directors provide economic information from their industries and the branch territory to the Atlanta Fed's president and head office directors, who use that information in discussing monetary policy options and making discount rate recommendations. The following people are on the board of directors as of June 2026:

=== Appointed by the Board of Governors ===
Name	Title	Term expires
W. Bradley Southern (Chair)	Chair and CEO, Louisiana-Pacific Corporation, Nashville	2026
Shanna Jackson	President, Nashville State Community College, Nashville	2027
Amanda W. Hite	President, STR at CoStar Group, Hendersonville	2028

=== Appointed by the Atlanta board of directors ===
Name	Title	Term expires
Marshall E. Crawford Jr.	President and CEO, The Housing Fund Inc., Nashville	2026
Adam L. Wright	Chief Executive Officer, Pilot Travel Centers LLC, Knoxville	2027
Christopher T. McKee	President and Chief Operating Officer, McKee Foods Corporation, Collegedale	2027
Laura Ritchey	President and CEO, GEODIS Americas, Brentwood	2028

== See also ==
- Federal Reserve Act
- Federal Reserve System
- Federal Reserve Bank
- Federal Reserve Districts
- Federal Reserve Branches
- Federal Reserve Bank of Atlanta
- Federal Reserve Bank of Atlanta Birmingham Branch Office
- Federal Reserve Bank of Atlanta Jacksonville Branch Office
- Federal Reserve Bank of Atlanta Miami Branch Office
- Federal Reserve Bank of Atlanta New Orleans Branch Office
- Nashville Financial Historic District
