= SEAF =

SEAF may refer to:

- Small Enterprise Assistance Funds
- Seattle Erotic Art Festival
- The fictional Super Earth Armed Forces from the video games Helldivers and Helldivers II, developed by Arrowhead Game Studios
