= Eugene Robert Black =

American attorney and businessman (1873–1934)

Eugene Black
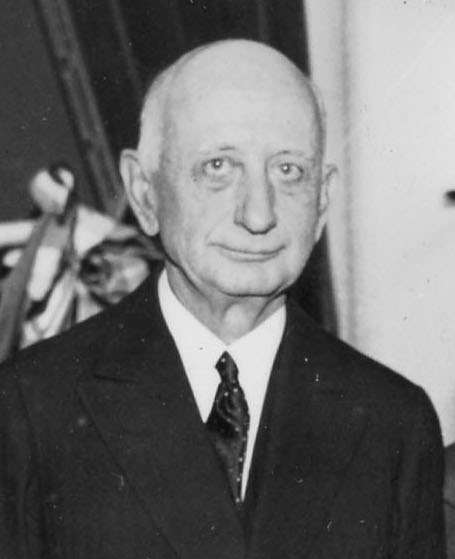

6th Chairman of the Federal Reserve
- In office May 19, 1933 – August 15, 1934
- President: Franklin D. Roosevelt
- Preceded by: Eugene Meyer
- Succeeded by: Marriner S. Eccles

Member of the Federal Reserve Board of Governors
- In office May 19, 1933 – August 15, 1934
- President: Franklin D. Roosevelt
- Preceded by: Eugene Meyer
- Succeeded by: Marriner S. Eccles

President of the Federal Reserve Bank of Atlanta
- In office August 15, 1934 – December 19, 1934
- Preceded by: W. S. Johns (Acting)
- Succeeded by: Oscar Newton
- In office January 13, 1928 – May 19, 1933
- Preceded by: Max Wellborn
- Succeeded by: W. S. Johns (Acting)

Personal details
- Born: January 7, 1873 Atlanta, Georgia, U.S.
- Died: December 19, 1934 (aged 61) Atlanta, Georgia, U.S.
- Education: University of Georgia (BA); Atlanta Law School (LLB)

Eugene Robert Black I (January 7, 1873 – December 19, 1934) was an American attorney and businessman who served as the 6th chairman of the Federal Reserve from 1933 to 1934. Before and after his term as chairman, Black also served as the governor of the Federal Reserve Bank of Atlanta from 1928 to 1933 and again from August 1934 until his death in December of the same year.

His eldest son, Eugene R. Black Sr., became the third president of the World Bank Group, serving from 1949 to 1962.

== Early life ==
He was born in Atlanta, Georgia, on January 7, 1873. He attended the University of Georgia, where he was a member of Chi Phi fraternity and the Phi Kappa Literary Society. Black practiced law for 28 years until he became president of the Atlanta Trust Company in 1921.

== Career ==
In 1928, he became Governor of the Federal Reserve Bank of Atlanta. He succeeded the longtime governor, Max Wellborn, who was also his daughter's father-in-law. When the Wall Street Crash of 1929 happened, he and two cashiers rushed to Nashville, Tennessee, to supply currency and credit to banks in the city and surrounding region. The situation worsened with other cities in the region experiencing bank runs.

Black kept his district afloat by rushing large quantities of cash to banks that were experiencing runs and extending credit to any bank that could offer any asset of value. He kept this policy active through the Great Depression into 1933. He, along with George L. Harrison, the governor of the Federal Reserve Bank of New York, recommended open market purchases to increase reserves. His insistence on expansionist policies led to the President appointing Black to the Federal Reserve Board in 1933.

== Personal life ==
In 1897, he married Gussie Grady, the daughter of Henry W. Grady, the Atlanta journalist and orator. They had a son, Eugene Robert Black II. Black died of a heart attack on December 19, 1934, in Atlanta, Georgia.

Other offices
Preceded by Max Wellborn	President of the Federal Reserve Bank of Atlanta; 1928–1933	Succeeded by W. S. Johns; Acting
Preceded by W. S. Johns; Acting	President of the Federal Reserve Bank of Atlanta; 1934	Succeeded by Oscar Newton
Government offices
Preceded by Eugene Meyer	Member of the Federal Reserve Board of Governors; 1933–1934	Succeeded by Marriner S. Eccles
Preceded by Eugene Meyer	Chairman of the Federal Reserve; 1933–1934	Succeeded by Marriner S. Eccles
