= Federal Reserve Bank of Atlanta Miami Branch =

Government bank

Coordinates: 25°48′33″N 80°20′42″W

Agency overview
- Jurisdiction: Sixth Federal Reserve District
- Headquarters: 9100 NW 36th Street; Miami, Florida 33178
- Parent agency: Federal Reserve Bank of Atlanta
- Website: www.atlantafed.org/who-we-are/visit/miami-branch

The Federal Reserve Bank of Atlanta Miami Branch Office is one of the five branch offices of the Federal Reserve Bank of Atlanta. The Miami branch is part of the Sixth Federal Reserve District, is located in Doral, Florida, and is the newest of the five branches in the district, having opened in 1975. The branch serves 13 counties in South Florida, including the Miami–Fort Lauderdale–West Palm Beach metropolitan area, and also processes foreign currency on behalf of central and correspondent banks serving customers in Central and South America and the Caribbean Basin.

Federal Reserve System Sixth District

The Miami Branch currently conducts tours by appointment. Admission is free. The branch also hosts exhibits on Florida's historic currency and rare large bills, along with interactive videos on the Federal Reserve's history and functions.

== History ==
The Miami branch was established in 1975, driven by continued growth in Florida's economy, and is the newest branch in the Sixth Federal Reserve District. Its establishment reflected Florida's transformation from one of the smallest economies in the Sixth District at the time of the Federal Reserve's founding in 1914 into one of the region's most significant financial centers.

The branch is currently undergoing a major expansion known as the Miami Campus and Cash Modernization (MCCM) project, which involves construction of a new, enlarged cash storage facility at the branch's existing site in Doral. The project is expected to be completed in late 2026.

== Board of directors ==
The Miami Branch board of directors has seven members: four appointed by the Atlanta board of directors, and three appointed by the Board of Governors. Branch directors provide economic information from their industries and the branch territory to the Atlanta Fed's president and head office directors, who use that information in discussing monetary policy options and making discount rate recommendations. The following people are on the board of directors as of June 2026:

=== Appointed by the Board of Governors ===
Name	Title	Term expires
Diane J. Bessette (Chair)	Vice President and Chief Financial Officer, Lennar Corporation, Miami	2026
Kathleen Cannon	President and CEO, United Way of Broward County, Fort Lauderdale	2027
Rita Case	President and CEO, Rick Case Automotive Group, Sunrise	2028

=== Appointed by the Atlanta board of directors ===
Name	Title	Term expires
Daniel Lavender	Chief Executive Officer, Moorings Park Institute Inc., Naples	2026
Ignacio Garcia-Menocal	Cofounder and CEO, Grove Bay Hospitality Group, Miami	2026
Ginger Martin	Chairperson–Fort Lauderdale, United Community Bank, Fort Lauderdale	2027
Jose E. Cueto	Chief Executive Officer, Grove Bank and Trust, Miami	2028

== See also ==
- Federal Reserve Act
- Federal Reserve System
- Federal Reserve Bank
- Federal Reserve Districts
- Federal Reserve Branches
- Federal Reserve Bank of Atlanta
- Federal Reserve Bank of Atlanta Birmingham Branch Office
- Federal Reserve Bank of Atlanta Jacksonville Branch Office
- Federal Reserve Bank of Atlanta Nashville Branch Office
- Federal Reserve Bank of Atlanta New Orleans Branch Office
