= Federal Reserve Bank of Atlanta Birmingham Branch =

Agency overview
- Jurisdiction: Sixth Federal Reserve District
- Headquarters: 524 Liberty Pkwy Birmingham, Alabama 35242
- Parent agency: Federal Reserve Bank of Atlanta
- Website: www.atlantafed.org/who-we-are/visit/birmingham-branch

The Federal Reserve Bank of Atlanta Birmingham Branch Office is one of the five branch offices of the Federal Reserve Bank of Atlanta. The Birmingham branch is part of the Sixth Federal Reserve District and serves the interior of Alabama.

Federal Reserve System Sixth District

The Birmingham Branch no longer conducts tours.

== History ==
The Birmingham branch opened on August 1, 1918, initially operating from leased space in the Jefferson County Bank Building. It was among the earliest branches established in the Sixth Federal Reserve District, opening the same year as the Jacksonville branch, and following the New Orleans branch, which had opened in 1915 as the first branch in the Federal Reserve System.

A purpose-built headquarters at 1801 Fifth Avenue North was completed in 1926, designed by the Birmingham architectural firm Warren, Knight & Davis in a style blending Greek Classicism and Art Deco elements. A five-story addition was appended to the building in 1958 to accommodate growing operations. The branch vacated the Fifth Avenue North building in 2000, relocating to its current facility at 524 Liberty Pkwy in Liberty Park.

== Historic building ==
- Federal Reserve Bank of Atlanta--Birmingham Branch
- U.S. National Register of Historic Places
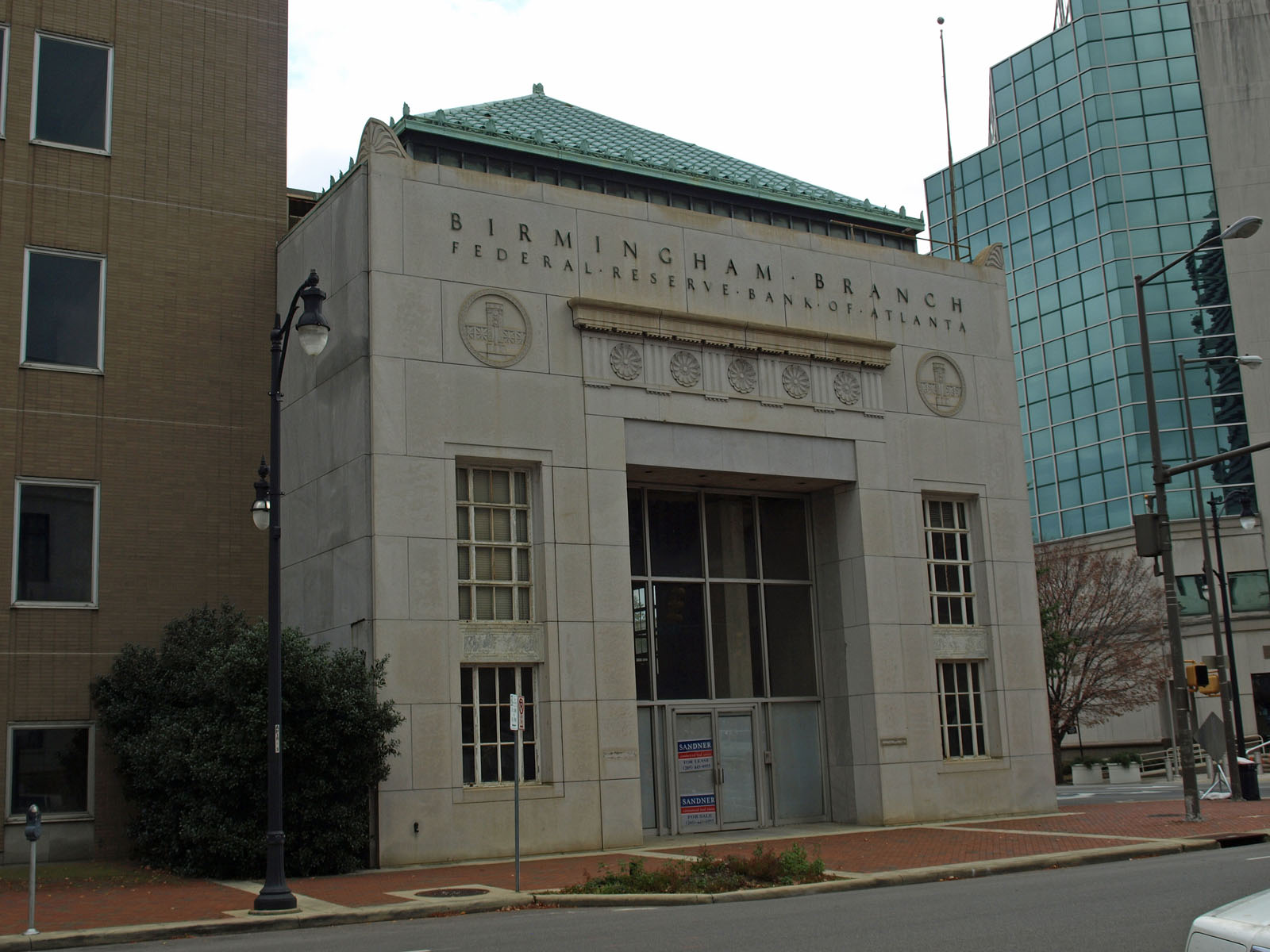
- Federal Reserve Bank of Atlanta--Birmingham Branch

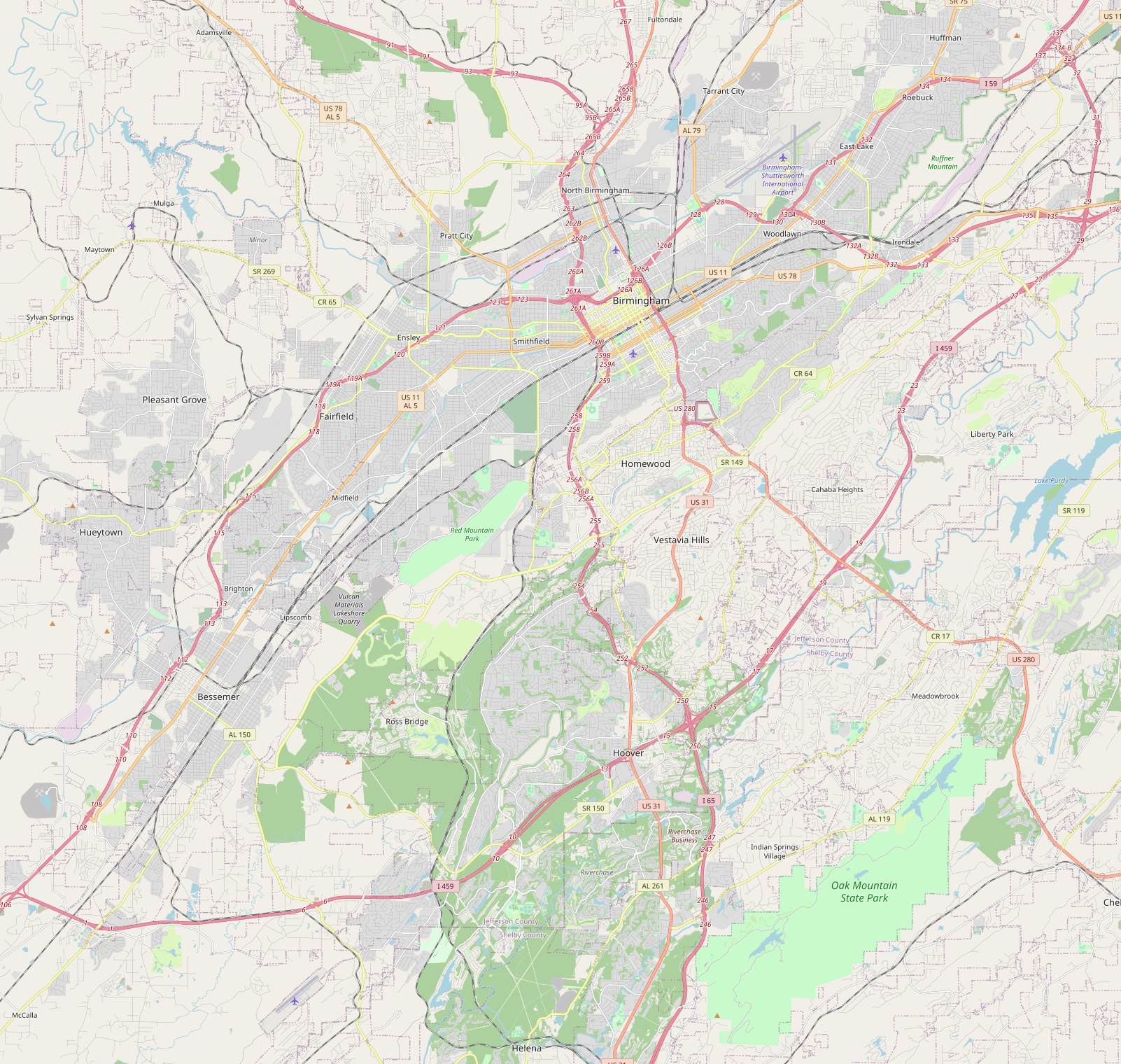
- Location within Birmingham, Alabama Location within Alabama Location within the United States
- Location: 1801 Fifth Ave. N, Birmingham, Alabama
- Coordinates: 33°31′6″N 86°48′38″W
- Area: Less than one acre
- Built: 1926
- Built by: A. J. Krebs
- Architect: Warren, Knight & Davis
- Architectural style: Colonial Revival, Art Deco
- NRHP reference No.: 03000230
- Added to NRHP: April 18, 2003

The former Federal Reserve Bank of Atlanta—Birmingham Branch building at 1801 Fifth Ave. N. was listed on the National Register of Historic Places in 2003. The branch now operates from 524 Liberty Pkwy in Birmingham.

== Board of directors ==
The Birmingham Branch board of directors has seven members: four appointed by the Atlanta board of directors, and three appointed by the Board of Governors. Branch directors provide economic information from their industries and the branch territory to the Atlanta Fed's president and head office directors, who use that information in discussing monetary policy options and making discount rate recommendations. The following people are on the board of directors as of June 2026:

=== Appointed by the Board of Governors ===
Name	Title	Term expires
Hafiz Chandiwala (Chair)	Executive Vice President and Chief Administrative Officer, Coca-Cola Bottling Company United Inc., Birmingham	2026
Dr. Samuel Addy	Associate Dean for Economic Development Outreach, Culverhouse College of Business; Senior Research Economist, Center for Business and Economic Research, University of Alabama, Tuscaloosa	2026
Samuel T. "Beau" Benton	President, LBA Hospitality, Dothan	2028

=== Appointed by the Atlanta board of directors ===
Name	Title	Term expires
Michelle Lewis	Chief Financial Officer, AAA Cooper Transportation, Dothan	2027
Larry E. Lewis Jr.	President, PROJECTXYZ Inc., Huntsville	2027
Michael D. Ross	President and Chief Executive Officer, CBS Banc-Corp., Russellville	2027
L. Davis Ozier	President, Coosa Composites, Pelham	2028

== See also ==
- Federal Reserve Act
- Federal Reserve System
- Federal Reserve Bank
- Federal Reserve Districts
- Federal Reserve Branches
- Federal Reserve Bank of Atlanta Jacksonville Branch Office
- Federal Reserve Bank of Atlanta Miami Branch Office
- Federal Reserve Bank of Atlanta New Orleans Branch Office
- Federal Reserve Bank of Atlanta Nashville Branch Office
