= Jack Guynn =

13th President of the Federal Reserve Bank of Atlanta
- In office January 1, 1996 – September 30, 2006
- Preceded by: Robert P. Forrestal
- Succeeded by: Dennis P. Lockhart

Personal details
- Born: 1943 (age 82–83)
- Education: Virginia Polytechnic Institute and State University (BS); Georgia Institute of Technology (MBA)

George C. "Jack" Guynn was the president and CEO of the Federal Reserve Bank of Atlanta from 1996 to 2006. Guynn retired from the Atlanta Fed in 2006 and served on the board of directors of Oxford Industries.

== Education ==
Guynn received a bachelor's degree in industrial engineering from Virginia Tech and also is a 1969 graduate of Georgia Tech's College of Management, from which he received an MBA.

He also received an honorary degree in Doctor of Humane Letters from Oglethorpe University in 2005.

Other offices
Preceded by Robert P. Forrestal	President of the Federal Reserve Bank of Atlanta; 1996–2006	Succeeded by Dennis P. Lockhart
