= Federal Reserve Bank =

American central banking institution

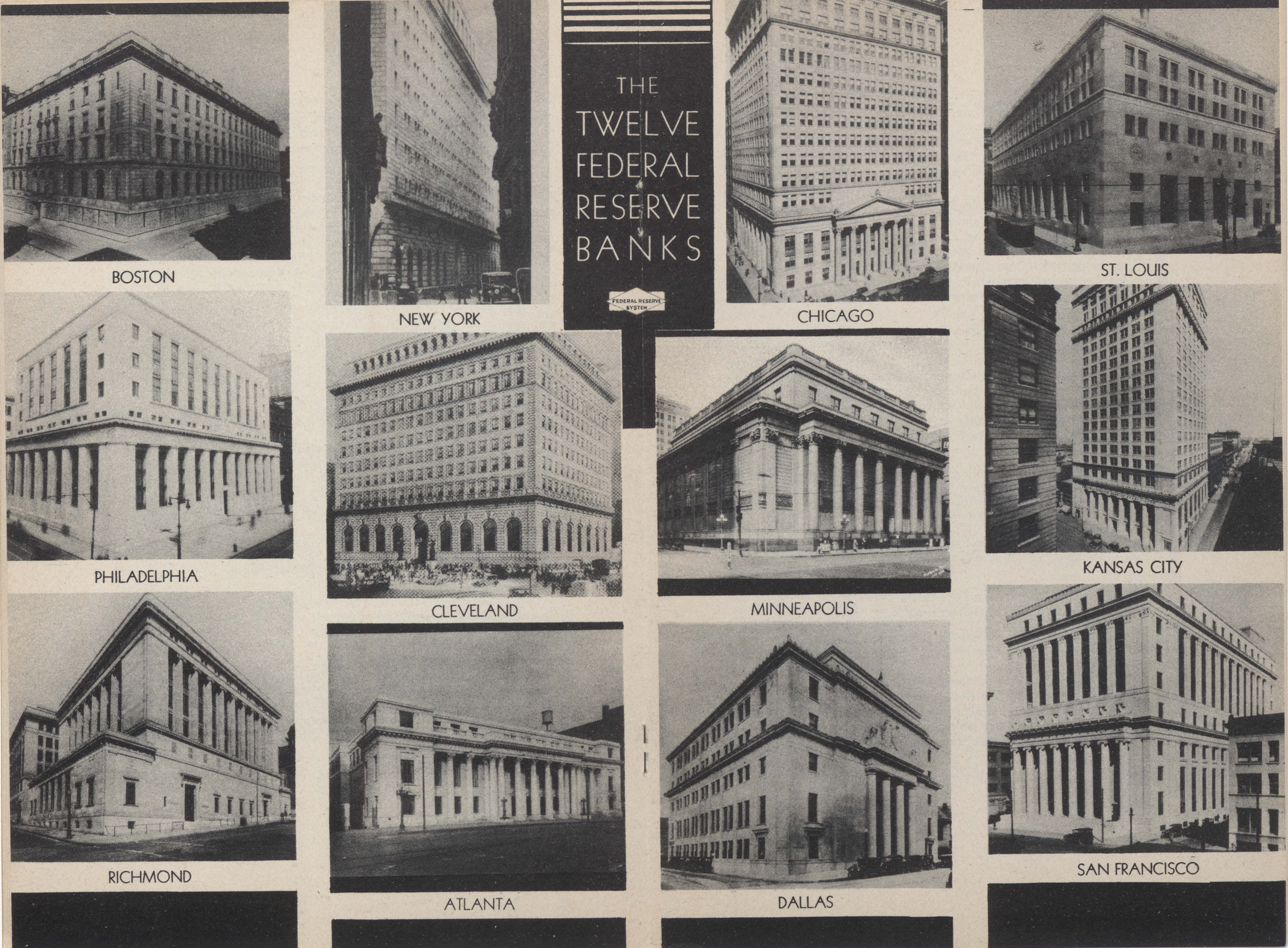
The twelve Reserve Bank buildings in 1936

A Federal Reserve Bank is a regional bank of the Federal Reserve System, the central banking system of the United States. There are twelve in total, one for each of the twelve Federal Reserve Districts that were created by the Federal Reserve Act of 1913. The banks are jointly responsible for implementing the monetary policy set forth by the Federal Open Market Committee, and are divided as follows:

- Federal Reserve Bank of Boston
- Federal Reserve Bank of New York
- Federal Reserve Bank of Philadelphia
- Federal Reserve Bank of Cleveland
- Federal Reserve Bank of Richmond
- Federal Reserve Bank of Atlanta
- Federal Reserve Bank of Chicago
- Federal Reserve Bank of St. Louis
- Federal Reserve Bank of Minneapolis
- Federal Reserve Bank of Kansas City
- Federal Reserve Bank of Dallas
- Federal Reserve Bank of San Francisco

Some banks also possess branches, with the whole system being headquartered at the Eccles Building in Washington, D.C.

Each regional bank's board has nine members. Members are of three classes: A, B, and C. There are three board members in each class. Class A members are chosen by the regional Bank's shareholders, and are intended to represent member banks' interests. Member banks are divided into three categories: large, medium, and small. Each category elects one of the three class A board members. Class B board members are also nominated by the region's member banks, but class B board members are supposed to represent the interests of the public. Lastly, class C board members are appointed by the board of governors, and are also intended to represent the interests of the public.

== History ==
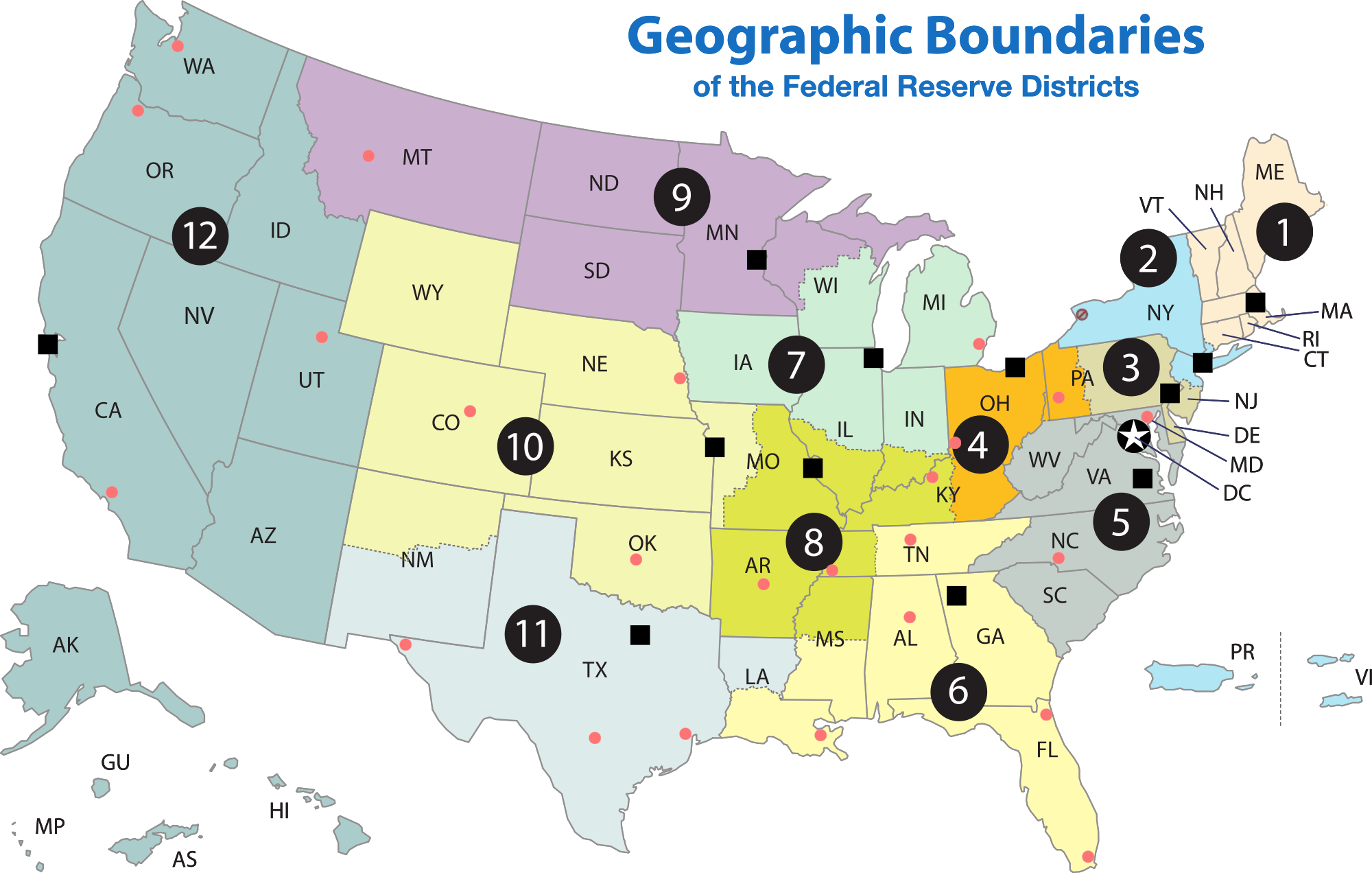
Map of the twelve Federal Reserve Districts, with the twelve Federal Reserve Districts enumerated in black circles and the twelve Federal Reserve Banks marked as black squares. Branches within each district are marked as red circles. The Washington, D.C. headquarters is marked with a star enclosed in a black circle.

The Federal Reserve Banks are the most recent institutions that the United States government has created to provide functions of a central bank. Prior institutions have included the First (1791–1811) and Second (1818–1824) Banks of the United States, the Independent Treasury (1846–1920) and the National Banking System (1863–1935). Several policy questions have arisen with these institutions, including the degree of influence by private interests, the balancing of regional economic concerns, the prevention of financial panics, and the type of reserves used to back currency.

A financial crisis known as the Panic of 1907 threatened several New York banks with failure, an outcome avoided through loans arranged by banker J. P. Morgan. Morgan succeeded in restoring confidence to the New York banking community, but the panic revealed weaknesses in the US financial system, such that a private banker could dictate the terms of a bank's survival. In other parts of the country, clearing houses briefly issued their own money notes to carry on business. In response, Congress formed the National Monetary Commission to investigate options for providing currency and credit in future panics. Based on the Commission's findings and other proposals, Congress established the Federal Reserve System in which several Federal Reserve Banks would provide liquidity to banks in different regions of the country. The Federal Reserve Banks opened for business in November 1914.

== Legal status ==
The Reserve Banks are organized as self-financing corporations and empowered by Congress to distribute currency and regulate its value under policies set by the Federal Open Market Committee and the Board of Governors. Their corporate structure reflects the concurrent interests of the government and the member banks, but neither of these interests amounts to outright ownership.

Legal cases involving the Federal Reserve Banks have concluded that they are private, but can be held or deemed as governmental in certain situations. In United States Shipping Board Emergency Fleet Corporation v. Western Union Telegraph Co., the US Supreme Court stated, "Instrumentalities like the national banks or the federal reserve banks, in which there are private interests, are not departments of the government. They are private corporations in which the government has an interest." The United States has an interest in the Federal Reserve Banks as tax-exempt federally created instrumentalities whose profits belong to the federal government, but this interest is not proprietary. In Lewis v. United States, the United States Court of Appeals for the Ninth Circuit stated that: "The Reserve Banks are not federal instrumentalities for purposes of the FTCA [the Federal Tort Claims Act], but are independent, privately owned and locally controlled corporations." The opinion went on to say, however, that: "The Reserve Banks have properly been held to be federal instrumentalities for some purposes," such as anti-bribery law. Another relevant decision is Scott v. Federal Reserve Bank of Kansas City, in which the distinction is made between Federal Reserve Banks, which are federally created instrumentalities, and the Board of Governors, which is a federal agency.

The original Federal Reserve Act provided starting capital for the Reserve Banks by requiring the participating banks to purchase stock in a Reserve Bank in proportion to their assets. This stock pays a dividend out of the Reserve Bank's earnings but otherwise is quite different from common stock in a private corporation. It may not be traded, transferred or borrowed against, and it grants no ownership of the Reserve Bank's surplus. A bank's stock ownership does not give it proportional voting power to choose the Reserve Bank's directors; instead, each member bank receives three ranked votes for six of the Reserve Bank's nine directors, who are subject to qualifications defined in the Federal Reserve Act. If a Reserve Bank were ever dissolved or liquidated, the Act states that members would be eligible to redeem their stock up to its purchase value, while any remaining surplus would belong to the federal government.

Regarding the structural relationship between the twelve Federal Reserve banks and the commercial (member) banks, political science professor Michael D. Reagan explains that,

the "ownership" of the Reserve Banks by the commercial banks is symbolic; they do not exercise the proprietary control associated with the concept of ownership nor share, beyond the statutory dividend, in Reserve Bank "profits." ... Bank ownership and election at the base are therefore devoid of substantive significance, despite the superficial appearance of private bank control that the formal arrangement creates.

== Function ==
The Federal Reserve Banks offer various services to the federal government and the private sector:

- Acting as depositories for bank reserves
- Lending to banks to cover short-term fund deficits, seasonal business cycles, or extraordinary liquidity demands (i.e. runs)
- Collecting and clearing payments between banks
- Issuing banknotes for general circulation as currency
- Administering the deposit accounts of the federal government
- Conducting auctions and buybacks of federal debt
- Purchasing obligations of non-bank entities via emergency credit facilities authorized by the Board of Governors

Historically the Reserve Banks compensated member banks for keeping reserves on deposit (and therefore unavailable for lending) by paying them a dividend from earnings, limited by law to 6 percent. The Emergency Economic Stabilization Act (EESA) of 2008 additionally authorized the Reserve Banks to pay interest on member bank reserves, while the FAST Act of 2015 imposed an additional dividend limit equal to the yield determined in the most recent 10-year Treasury Note auction.

Although all Reserve Banks have the legal authority to conduct open-market operations, in practice only the Reserve Bank of New York does so. It manages the System Open Market Account (SOMA), a portfolio of government-issued or government-guaranteed securities that is shared among all of the Reserve Banks.

== Finances ==
The Federal Reserve Banks fund their own operations, primarily by distributing the earnings from the System Open Market Account. Expenses and dividends paid are typically a small fraction of a Federal Reserve Bank's revenue each year. The banks may retain part of their earnings in their own surplus funds that are limited to $7.5 billion, system-wide. The rest must be transferred via the Board of Governors to the Secretary of the Treasury, who then deposits it to the Treasury's general fund. When a Reserve Bank's earnings are insufficient to cover its expenses and dividends, it introduces a deferred asset on its books to be realized from future earnings.

The Reserve Banks were historically capitalized through deposits of gold, and in 1933 all privately held monetary gold was transferred to them under Executive Order 6102. This gold was in turn transferred to the Treasury under the Gold Reserve Act of 1934 in exchange for gold certificates that may not be redeemed under current law. The Reserve Banks continue to report these certificates as assets, but they do not represent direct gold ownership and the Board of Governors has stated that "the Federal Reserve does not own gold."

Although the Reserve Banks operate as distinct financial entities, they participate each April in an interdistrict settlement process that has three purposes: settling the payment balances that the Reserve Banks owe each other; allocating ownership of the SOMA portfolio; and establishing uniform gold certificate backing for Federal Reserve Notes. This process connects the Reserve Banks' different functions – monetary policy, payment clearing and currency issue – as an integrated system.

The Federal Reserve Banks conduct ongoing internal audits of their operations to ensure that their accounts are accurate and comply with the Federal Reserve System's accounting principles. The banks are also subject to two types of external auditing. Since 1978 the Government Accountability Office (GAO) has conducted regular audits of the banks' operations. The GAO audits are reported to the public, but they may not review a bank's monetary policy decisions or disclose them to the public. Since 1999 each bank has also been required to submit to an annual audit by an external accounting firm, which produces a confidential report to the bank and a summary statement for the bank's annual report. Some members of Congress continue to advocate a more public and intrusive GAO audit of the Federal Reserve System, but Federal Reserve representatives support the existing restrictions to prevent political influence over long-range economic decisions.

== Banks ==
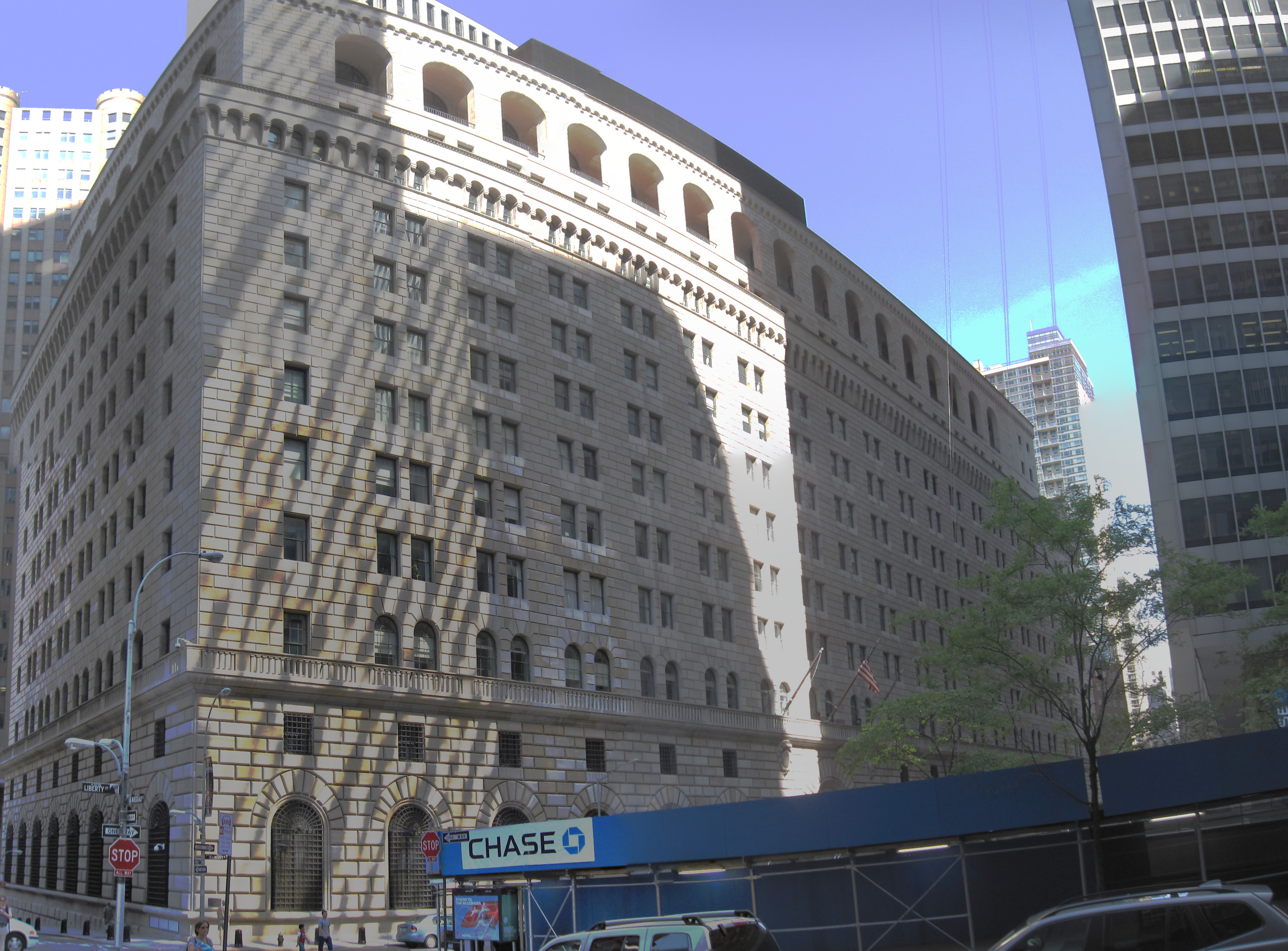
The Federal Reserve Bank of New York holds special status in the system.

The Federal Reserve officially identifies Districts by number and Reserve Bank city. Most banks also have branch locations.

- 1st District (A): Federal Reserve Bank of Boston
- 2nd District (B): Federal Reserve Bank of New York
  - Federal Reserve Bank of New York Buffalo Branch (closed 2008)
- 3rd District (C): Federal Reserve Bank of Philadelphia
- 4th District (D): Federal Reserve Bank of Cleveland
  - Federal Reserve Bank of Cleveland Cincinnati Branch
  - Federal Reserve Bank of Cleveland Pittsburgh Branch
- 5th District (E): Federal Reserve Bank of Richmond
  - Federal Reserve Bank of Richmond Baltimore Branch
  - Federal Reserve Bank of Richmond Charlotte Branch
- 6th District (F): Federal Reserve Bank of Atlanta
  - Federal Reserve Bank of Atlanta Birmingham Branch
  - Federal Reserve Bank of Atlanta Jacksonville Branch
  - Federal Reserve Bank of Atlanta Miami Branch
  - Federal Reserve Bank of Atlanta Nashville Branch
  - Federal Reserve Bank of Atlanta New Orleans Branch
- 7th District (G): Federal Reserve Bank of Chicago
  - Federal Reserve Bank of Chicago Detroit Branch
- 8th District (H): Federal Reserve Bank of St. Louis
  - Federal Reserve Bank of St. Louis Little Rock Branch
  - Federal Reserve Bank of St. Louis Louisville Branch
  - Federal Reserve Bank of St. Louis Memphis Branch
- 9th District (I): Federal Reserve Bank of Minneapolis
  - Federal Reserve Bank of Minneapolis Helena Branch
- 10th District (J): Federal Reserve Bank of Kansas City
  - Federal Reserve Bank of Kansas City Denver Branch
  - Federal Reserve Bank of Kansas City Oklahoma City Branch
  - Federal Reserve Bank of Kansas City Omaha Branch
- 11th District (K): Federal Reserve Bank of Dallas
  - Federal Reserve Bank of Dallas El Paso Branch
  - Federal Reserve Bank of Dallas Houston Branch
  - Federal Reserve Bank of Dallas San Antonio Branch
- 12th District (L): Federal Reserve Bank of San Francisco
  - Federal Reserve Bank of San Francisco Los Angeles Branch
  - Federal Reserve Bank of San Francisco Portland Branch
  - Federal Reserve Bank of San Francisco Salt Lake City Branch
  - Federal Reserve Bank of San Francisco Seattle Branch
  - Federal Reserve Bank of San Francisco Spokane Branch (closed 1938)

The New York Federal Reserve district is the largest by asset value. San Francisco, followed by Kansas City and Minneapolis, represent the largest geographical districts. Missouri is the only state to have two Federal Reserve Banks (Kansas City and St. Louis). California, Florida, Missouri, Ohio, Pennsylvania, Tennessee, and Texas are the only states which have two or more Federal Reserve Bank branches seated within their states, with Missouri, Pennsylvania, and Tennessee having branches of two different districts within the same state. In the 12th District, the Seattle Branch serves Alaska, and the San Francisco Bank serves Hawaii. New York, Richmond, and San Francisco are the only banks that oversee non-U.S. state territories. The System serves these territories as follows: the New York Bank serves the Commonwealth of Puerto Rico and the US Virgin Islands; the Richmond Bank serves the District of Columbia; the San Francisco Bank serves American Samoa, Guam, and the Commonwealth of the Northern Mariana Islands. The Board of Governors last revised the branch boundaries of the System in February 1996.

=== Assets ===
Federal Reserve Bank	Total assets in billions USD
New York City	4,155
San Francisco	820
Richmond	651
Atlanta	493
Chicago	411
Dallas	336
Cleveland	288
Boston	183
St. Louis	114
Philadelphia	111
Kansas City	96
Minneapolis	54
All banks	7713

== List of current presidents and CEOs of Federal Reserve Banks ==
Federal Reserve Bank	Commonly known as	Incumbent president & CEO	Status
New York City	New York Fed	John Williams	Vice Chairman, Federal Open Market Committee (FOMC) Permanent FOMC Member
San Francisco	San Francisco Fed	Mary C. Daly	2023 FOMC Alternate Member; 2024 FOMC Member
Atlanta	Atlanta Fed	Cheryl Venable (interim)	2023 FOMC Alternate Member; 2024 FOMC Member
Richmond	Richmond Fed	Thomas Barkin	2023 FOMC Alternate Member; 2024 FOMC Member
Chicago	Chicago Fed	Austan Goolsbee	2022 FOMC Alternate Member; 2023 FOMC Member; 2024 FOMC Alternate Member; 2025 FOMC Member
Dallas	Dallas Fed	Lorie K. Logan	2022 FOMC Alternate Member; 2023 FOMC Member
Cleveland	Cleveland Fed	Beth M. Hammack	2024 FOMC Member; 2025 FOMC Alternate Member
Philadelphia	Philly Fed	Patrick Harker	2022 FOMC Alternate Member; 2023 FOMC Member
Boston	Boston Fed	Susan M. Collins	2024 FOMC Alternate Member; 2025 FOMC Member
St. Louis	St. Louis Fed	Alberto G. Musalem	2024 FOMC Alternate Member; 2025 FOMC Member
Kansas City	Kansas City Fed	Jeffrey R. Schmid	2022 FOMC Member; 2024 FOMC Alternate Member; 2025 FOMC Member
Minneapolis	Minneapolis Fed	Neel Kashkari	2022 FOMC Alternate Member; 2023 FOMC Member

== See also ==
- Chair of the Federal Reserve
- Criticism of the Federal Reserve
- Federal funds rate
- Federal Reserve Act
- List of Federal Reserve branches
- List of regions of the United States#Federal Reserve Banks

== General and cited sources ==
- Page, Walter Hines; Page, Arthur Wilson (May 1914). "The March of Events: The Federal Reserve Districts". The World's Work: A History of Our Time. XLIV (1): 10–11. "The first new piece of machinery for the new currency system is now provided."
