= Raphael Bostic =

American economist, academic, and public servant

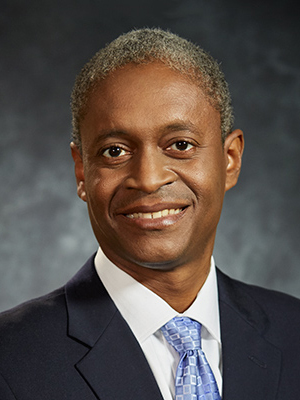

15th President of the Federal Reserve Bank of Atlanta
- In office June 5, 2017 – February 28, 2026
- Preceded by: Dennis P. Lockhart
- Succeeded by: Cheryl Venable (interim)

Personal details
- Born: June 5, 1966 (age 60) New York City, U.S.
- Education: Harvard University (BA); Stanford University (MA, PhD)

Raphael William Bostic (born June 5, 1966) is an American economist, academic, and public servant who served as the 15th president and CEO of the Federal Reserve Bank of Atlanta from 2017 to 2026. During his academic career, Bostic served as chair of the Department of Governance, Management, and the Policy Process at the Price School of Public Policy at the University of Southern California.

== Early life ==
Bostic was born to Rafael Theodore Bostic of St. Croix and Viola Williams in New York City and grew up in Delran Township, New Jersey, where he was valedictorian of Delran High School. He earned a B.A. degree from Harvard University in 1987 with a combined major in economics and psychology. In 1995, he earned his Ph.D. in economics from Stanford University.

== Career ==
Bostic served as a board member of Freddie Mac, the Lincoln Institute of Land Policy and Abode Communities. He is a fellow of the National Academy of Public Administration vice president of the Association for Public Policy Analysis and Management, a member of the board of trustees of Enterprise Community Partners, and a research advisory board member of the Reinvestment Fund.

Bostic was an economist for the Federal Reserve Board of Governors from 1995 to 2001, and the assistant secretary for policy development and research at United States Department of Housing and Urban Development from 2009 to 2012. He was the Chair of the Department on Governance, Management and the Policy Process at the Sol Price School of Public Policy at the University of Southern California from 2012 to 2017.

In 2020, Bostic was elected to a six-year term on the Harvard Board of Overseers. Later that year, he wrote an essay for the FRB Atlanta entitled, "A Moral and Economic Imperative to End Racism." In it he wrote that systematic racism drags on the economy.

On October 14, 2022, Bostic failed to disclose stock trading transactions in the five years leading the bank that were revealed after a federal investigation. Bostic stated a 3rd party manager had made the transactions, unknowingly to him. Federal Reserve Chairman Jerome Powell asked the Office of Inspector General for the Federal Reserve Board to initiate an independent review of Bostic's financial disclosures.

On September 11, 2024, the Office of the Inspector General reported that Bostic had "violated the FOMC blackout rule when securities transactions were executed on his behalf during multiple blackout periods."

In November 2025, Bostic announced his intention to retire as president of the Federal Reserve Bank of Atlanta, effective February 28, 2026. He was succeeded on an interim basis by First Vice President and COO Cheryl Venable.

=== Political future ===
Throughout his career, Bostic has been mentioned as a potential nominee for a variety of roles in the federal government. In November 2020, Bostic was named as a potential candidate for Secretary of the Treasury in the then-upcoming Biden administration, a position that ultimately went to Janet Yellen.

In August 2021, Bostic was mentioned as a contender for the position of Comptroller of the Currency. That same year, he was mentioned as a possible replacement for Jerome Powell as Chair of the Federal Reserve, before Powell was re-nominated for a second four-year term.

== Personal life ==
Bostic is the first African-American and first openly gay person selected to lead a regional Federal Reserve bank.

== See also ==
- Federal Reserve System
- Federal Reserve Bank of Atlanta

Other offices
Preceded by Dennis P. Lockhart	President of the Federal Reserve Bank of Atlanta; 2017–2026	Succeeded by Cheryl Venable (interim)
