= Federal Reserve Bank of Atlanta New Orleans Branch =

Branch of the Federal Reserve Bank of Atlanta

Agency overview
- Jurisdiction: Sixth Federal Reserve District
- Headquarters: 525 St. Charles Avenue; New Orleans, Louisiana 70130
- Parent agency: Federal Reserve Bank of Atlanta
- Website: www.atlantafed.org/who-we-are/visit/new-orleans-branch

The Federal Reserve Bank of Atlanta New Orleans Branch Office is one of the five branch offices of the Federal Reserve Bank of Atlanta. The New Orleans branch is part of the Sixth Federal Reserve District, serving Louisiana, Mississippi, and the Gulf Coast region. It holds the distinction of being the first branch established in the Federal Reserve System, opening on September 10, 1915.

Federal Reserve System Sixth District

The New Orleans Branch is home to the Museum of Trade, Finance, and the Fed, established in 2013 and open for self-guided tours free of charge. The museum's front lobby features an eagle statue that has been part of the branch since its early history.

== History ==
When President Woodrow Wilson signed the Federal Reserve Act in December 1913, New Orleans was a strong contender to host the Sixth District's regional Reserve Bank. At the time it was the South's largest city and a major financial and commercial center, with more banking deposits than Atlanta. Although Atlanta was ultimately selected as the Sixth District headquarters, discussions about establishing a New Orleans branch began almost immediately. The branch's distance from Atlanta — nearly 500 miles — made servicing such a significant financial center from headquarters alone impractical.

On September 10, 1915, the New Orleans branch opened as the first branch office in the Federal Reserve System. Its initial operations included cash and coin processing, check collection, fiscal agency operations, and member bank reserve accounts. During World War I and World War II, the branch also played a role in financing U.S. military efforts by selling Liberty Bonds and Victory Bonds respectively.

The branch moved into its first purpose-built permanent home on the corner of Carondelet and Common Streets in 1923. In October 1966, the branch relocated to its current building at the corner of Carondelet Street, Poydras Street, and St. Charles Avenue, with employees and armored trucks transporting millions of dollars through the streets of New Orleans on moving day. A branch expansion had also been completed at this location in 1966, as noted in district records.

== Board of directors ==
The New Orleans Branch board of directors has seven members: four appointed by the Atlanta board of directors, and three appointed by the Board of Governors. Branch directors provide economic information from their industries and the branch territory to the Atlanta Fed's president and head office directors, who use that information in discussing monetary policy options and making discount rate recommendations. The following people are on the board of directors as of June 2026:

Name	Title	Term expires
AJ Kumaran	Co-Chief Executive Officer and Chief Operating Officer, Raising Cane's Chicken Fingers, Baton Rouge	2026
William G. Yates III	President and CEO, W.G. Yates & Sons Construction Company, Biloxi	2026
Kimberly Fontan	Executive Vice President and CFO, Entergy Corporation, New Orleans	2027
Shelby Russ	President and CEO, AOS Interior Environments, New Orleans	2027
Melissa B. Rogers	President and Founder, Noble Plastics, Grand Coteau	2028
William J. Bynum	CEO, Hope Credit Union, Hope Enterprise Corporation, and Hope Policy Institute, Jackson	2028

== See also ==
- Federal Reserve Act
- Federal Reserve System
- Federal Reserve Bank
- Federal Reserve Districts
- Federal Reserve Branches
- Federal Reserve Bank of Atlanta
- Federal Reserve Bank of Atlanta Birmingham Branch Office
- Federal Reserve Bank of Atlanta Jacksonville Branch Office
- Federal Reserve Bank of Atlanta Miami Branch Office
- Federal Reserve Bank of Atlanta Nashville Branch Office
