= Henrietta Dozier =

American architect

Henrietta Cuttino Dozier
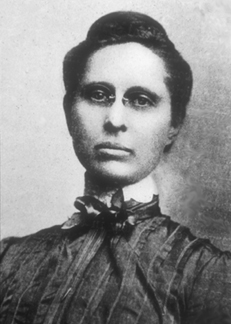
- Born: 1872; Fernandina Beach, Florida, United States
- Died: 1947 (aged 74–75)
- Education: Massachusetts Institute of Technology (1899)
- Occupation: Architect

Henrietta Cuttino Dozier (1872–1947) was an American architect in Atlanta, Georgia, and Jacksonville, Florida. She is considered the first female architect in the state of Georgia and was the first woman in the Southern United States to receive formal architectural training from a national school of architecture. She designed churches, schools, government buildings, apartments and houses.

== Early life and education ==
Dozier was born in Fernandina Beach, Florida, the third and last child of Henry Cuttino Dozier (who died a few months before she was born) and Cornelia Ann (Scriven) Dozier, both originally from South Carolina. She had a brother, Scriven, and a sister, Louise. From an early age, she knew she wanted to be an architect, and after high school she apprenticed in an architect's office before spending two years at Pratt Institute in Brooklyn, New York. She then went to the Massachusetts Institute of Technology, from which she graduated with an architectural degree in 1899, one of three women in a class of 176.

== Architectural career ==
Dozier worked in Atlanta for 13 years before moving to Jacksonville in 1914. She worked for the Jacksonville Engineering Department during World War I and then went out on her own, opening an architectural practice in 1918. She used various gender-neutral or male-sounding variants on her name throughout her career, including 'H.C. Dozier' and 'Harry' Dozier.

Although she disliked modernism in architecture, considering it a fad, she had some unusual opinions on other aspects of her field. In a 1939 interview, Dozier, then in her 60s, discussed "the earth-rammed house" and her belief that this energy-efficient, vermin-resistant, comparatively inexpensive form of housing was right for the Southern climate and would eventually catch on.

In 1905, Dozier became the third woman member of the American Institute of Architects.

== Selected buildings ==
- G.W. Gignilliat House, Seneca, S.C. (1898).
- John C. Cooper House, Jacksonville, Florida (1902).
- St. Philip's Episcopal Church, 801 N. Pearl St., Jacksonville, Florida (1903), plus a 1914 addition.
- All Saints Episcopal Chapel, Atlanta, Georgia (1903). Damaged by fire and eventually incorporated into a bigger structure.
- John Blackmar House, alterations, Columbus, GA. (1909)
- Federal Reserve Bank of Atlanta Jacksonville Branch, with Atlanta architect A. Ten Eyck Brown (1923–1924).
- Lampru Court Apartments (1924).
- Welshan-Palmer House, Riverside, Jacksonville (1925).

== See also ==
- Architecture of Jacksonville
