= Federal Reserve Bank of Atlanta =

Member Bank of Federal Reserve

Coordinates: 33°46′57″N 84°23′7″W

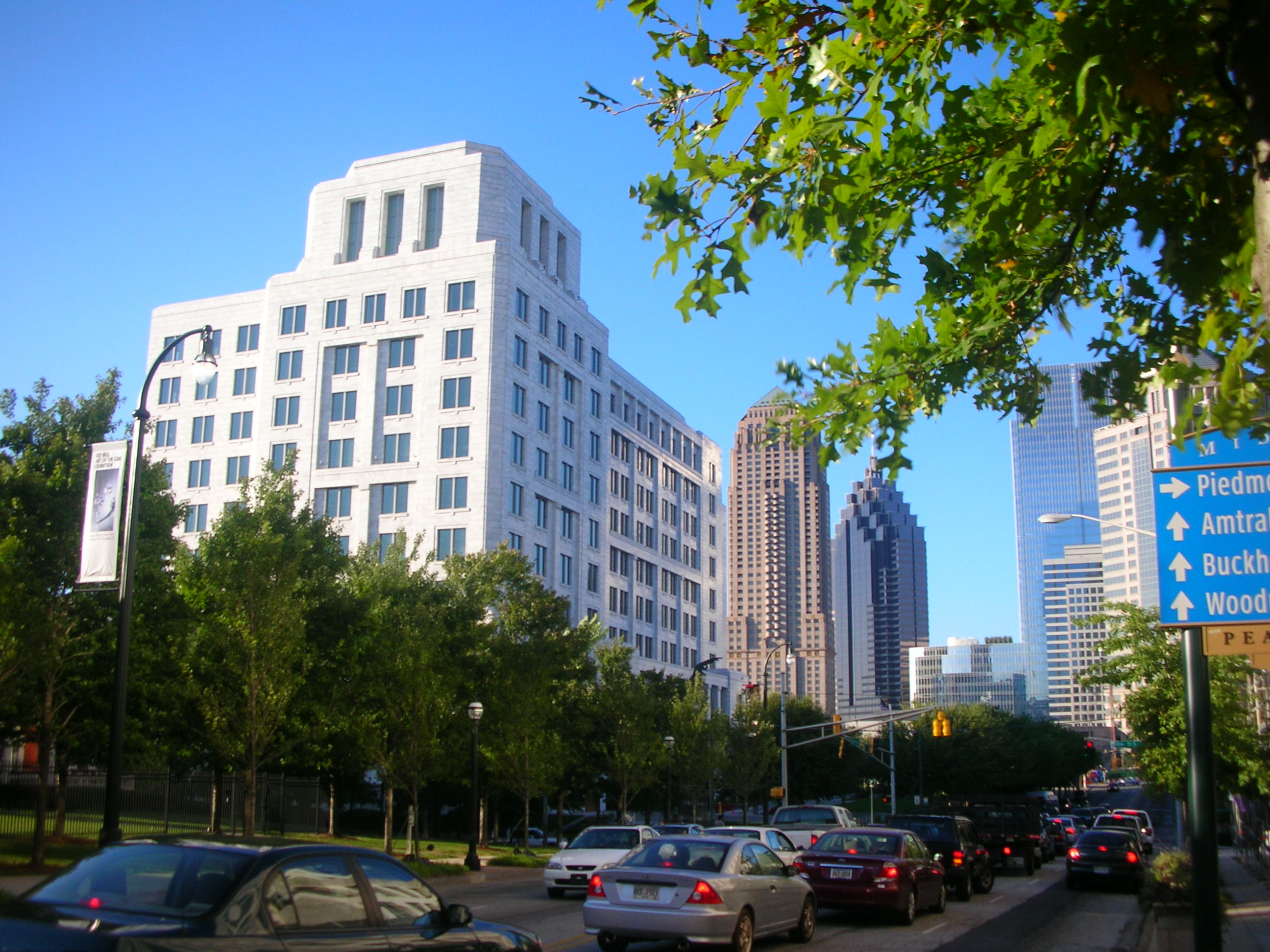
- The Federal Reserve Bank of Atlanta in 2006
- Central bank of: Sixth District: Alabama; Florida; Georgia Parts of: Louisiana; Mississippi; Tennessee
- Headquarters: 1000 Peachtree St NE; Atlanta, Georgia, U.S.
- Established: May 18, 1914 (112 years ago)
- President: Cheryl Venable (interim)
- Website: atlantafed.org
- The Federal Reserve Bank of Atlanta is one of 12 regional banks that make up the Federal Reserve System

The Federal Reserve Bank of Atlanta (informally the Atlanta Fed and the Bank) is one of the twelve Federal Reserve Banks of the United States. It is responsible for the Sixth District of the Federal Reserve System, which encompasses Alabama, Florida, and Georgia, the eastern two-thirds of Tennessee, the southern portion of Louisiana, and southern Mississippi. Along with its Midtown Atlanta headquarters, the bank operates five branches in Birmingham, Jacksonville, Miami, Nashville, and New Orleans. These branches provide cash to banks, savings and loans, and other depository institutions; transfer money electronically; and clear millions of checks.

In addition to supporting the U.S. financial system, the Atlanta Fed carries out the supervision and regulation of the banks operating within the sixth district. It also is a source of research and expertise for public and private decision makers within the district. The Atlanta Fed is currently led by interim president and CEO Cheryl Venable, who assumed the role in 2026.

== History ==
The Federal Reserve Act, signed by President Woodrow Wilson on December 23, 1913, created the Federal Reserve System with the original objective of providing the nation with a safer, more flexible, and stable monetary and financial system. A Reserve Bank Organization Committee selected Atlanta as the site for the Sixth District's Reserve Bank, announcing the decision in April 1914. The bank opened for business on November 16, 1914, operating from rented space in Atlanta's Hurt Building. In its early years, the Atlanta Fed focused on strengthening the cotton economy of the Sixth District and reducing the region's dependence on New York banks, while also working to enroll member banks in the Federal Reserve System.

Enrolling banks in the Sixth District proved challenging. Many smaller state-chartered banks resisted joining, in part due to the Federal Reserve's requirement that checks be cleared at par value rather than with the exchange fees many southern banks customarily charged. This nonpar banking dispute persisted in the District long after it had been resolved elsewhere in the country.

During the Great Depression, the Atlanta Fed worked to stabilize the regional banking system as dozens of banks across the Southeast closed. The bank assumed the assets of many failed institutions and made emergency loans to prevent wider economic damage.

The 1950s brought expansion across the district, with branch offices in Jacksonville, Nashville, and Birmingham constructing new buildings to accommodate growing check volumes. In 1964, the Atlanta Fed built a new headquarters at the same Marietta Street site it had occupied since its early years. The bank moved to its current headquarters at 1000 Peachtree Street NE in Midtown Atlanta in 2001.

During the financial crisis of 2007–2008, which produced the worst recession in the United States since the Great Depression, the Atlanta Fed created its Regional Economic Information Network (REIN) in 2008 to more systematically gather data on economic conditions across the Southeast.

The COVID-19 pandemic that began in 2020 caused severe economic disruption across the Sixth District, particularly affecting the leisure and hospitality industries concentrated in the region. The Atlanta Fed closely studied the pandemic's effects on the southeastern economy and produced research intended to inform the policy response.

== Responsibilities and functions ==
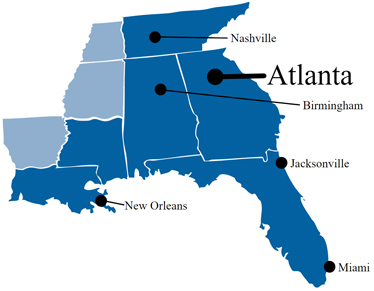
Federal Reserve System's Sixth District

The Atlanta Fed's footprint covers the southeastern U.S., including the states of Alabama, Florida, and Georgia, 74 counties in the eastern two-thirds of Tennessee, 38 parishes of southern Louisiana, and 43 counties of southern Mississippi as part of the Federal Reserve System.

The Atlanta Fed, along with the other 11 regional district banks, has three primary functions: assisting with monetary policy, operation of nationwide payment system, and administering bank supervision and regulation. Its job is to decide the interest rates, and the president meets with other bank presidents and board members. The bank's board of directors makes recommendations on the levels of discount rates.

Secondarily, the Atlanta Fed is a source of research and expertise for public and private decision makers within the district. Researchers within the Atlanta Fed have innovated new tools to gauge the health of the macro U.S. economy, the two most notable are GDPNow and the Wage Growth Tracker. The Atlanta Fed's GDPNow is a "nowcasting" model for gross domestic product (GDP) growth that synthesizes the related GDP subcomponents with monthly source data prior to the formal GDP release by the Bureau of Economic Analysis, and is widely followed by financial markets. The Wage Growth Tracker is a measure of the nominal wage growth of individuals, using microdata from the Current Population Survey from the Bureau of Labor Statistics.

== Leadership ==
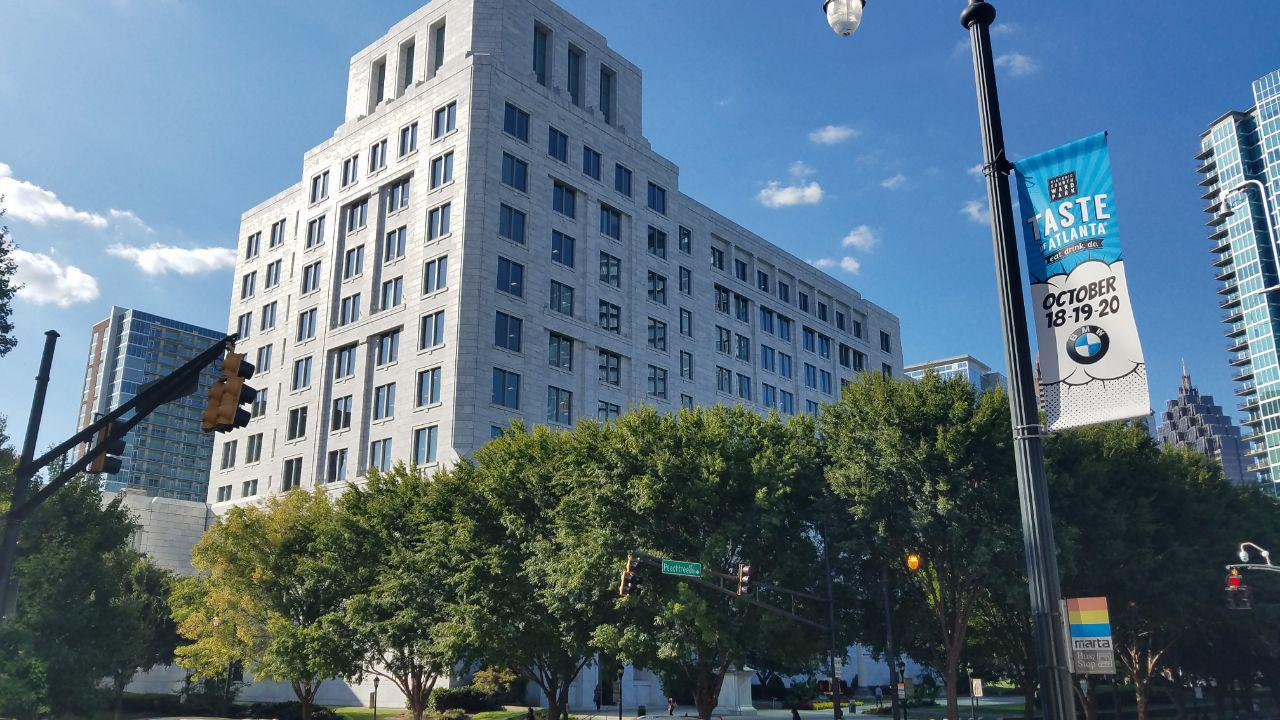
Federal Reserve Bank of Atlanta headquarters, designed by the 2011 Driehaus Prize winner Robert A. M. Stern

The bank is governed by a board of directors, which is drawn from the sixth district's business community, banks, and labor and consumer organizations, and makes recommendations every two weeks on the level of the discount rate, which is the rate at which the bank lends to commercial banks.

Following the retirement of Raphael Bostic on February 28, 2026, the bank is led by interim president and CEO Cheryl Venable, who also serves as first vice president and chief operating officer.

=== Governors and presidents ===
There have been 15 chief executive officers of the Atlanta Fed. The title of Reserve Bank chief executive officer was changed to president by the Banking Act of 1935.

#	CEO	Life span	Term start	Term end
Governors
1	Joseph A. McCord	1857-1943	October 19, 1914	January 10, 1919
2	Max Wellborn	1862-1957	March 1, 1919	January 1, 1928
3	Eugene R. Black	1873-1934	January 13, 1928	May 19, 1933
-	W.S. Johns	-	May 19, 1933	August 16, 1934
4	Eugene R. Black*	1873-1934	August 16, 1934	December 19, 1934
5	Oscar Newton*	1877-1939	January 10, 1935	—
Presidents
(5)	Oscar Newton*	1877-1939	—	February 13, 1939
6	Robert S. Parker*	1884-1941	February 18, 1939	March 28, 1941
7	William S. McLarin Jr.	1889-1960	May 9, 1941	March 1, 1951
8	Malcolm H. Bryan	1902-1967	April 1, 1951	September 30, 1965
9	Harold T. Patterson	1903-1971	October 1, 1965	January 31, 1968
10	M. Monroe Kimbrel	1903-1971	February 1, 1968	March 31, 1980
11	William F. Ford	-	August 1, 1980	October 1, 1983
12	Robert P. Forrestal	1931-2004	December 7, 1983	December 31, 1995
13	George C. "Jack" Guynn	1943-	January 1, 1996	September 30, 2006
-	Patrick K. Barron	-	October 1, 2006	February 28, 2007
14	Dennis P. Lockhart†	1947-	March 1, 2007	February 28, 2017
-	Marie C. Gooding	-	March 1, 2017	June 4, 2017
15	Raphael Bostic	1966-	June 5, 2017	February 28, 2026
-	Cheryl Venable	-	March 1, 2026	Incumbent

	Denotes acting officeholder
†	Stepped down due to reaching retirement age
*	Died in office

=== Board of directors ===
The following people are on the board of directors as of June 2026:

Class A
Name	Title	Term expires
Rajinder P. Singh	Chairman, President, and CEO, BankUnited Inc.	2026
William Y. Carroll Jr.	President and CEO, SmartBank Inc.	2027
Cynthia N. Day	President and CEO, Citizens Trust Bank	2028

Class B
Name	Title	Term expires
Michael E. Longo	Former President and CEO, Hibbett Inc.	2026
G. Janelle Frost	President and CEO, AMERISAFE Inc.	2027
Nicole B. Thomas	Hospital President, Baptist Medical Center Jacksonville	2028

Class C
Name	Title	Term expires
Gregory A. Haile (Chair)	CEO, Upwardly Global	2026
Ana M. Menendez	CFO and Treasurer, Watsco Inc.	2027
James O. Etheredge (Deputy Chair)	Former CEO, Accenture North America	2028

== Headquarters ==
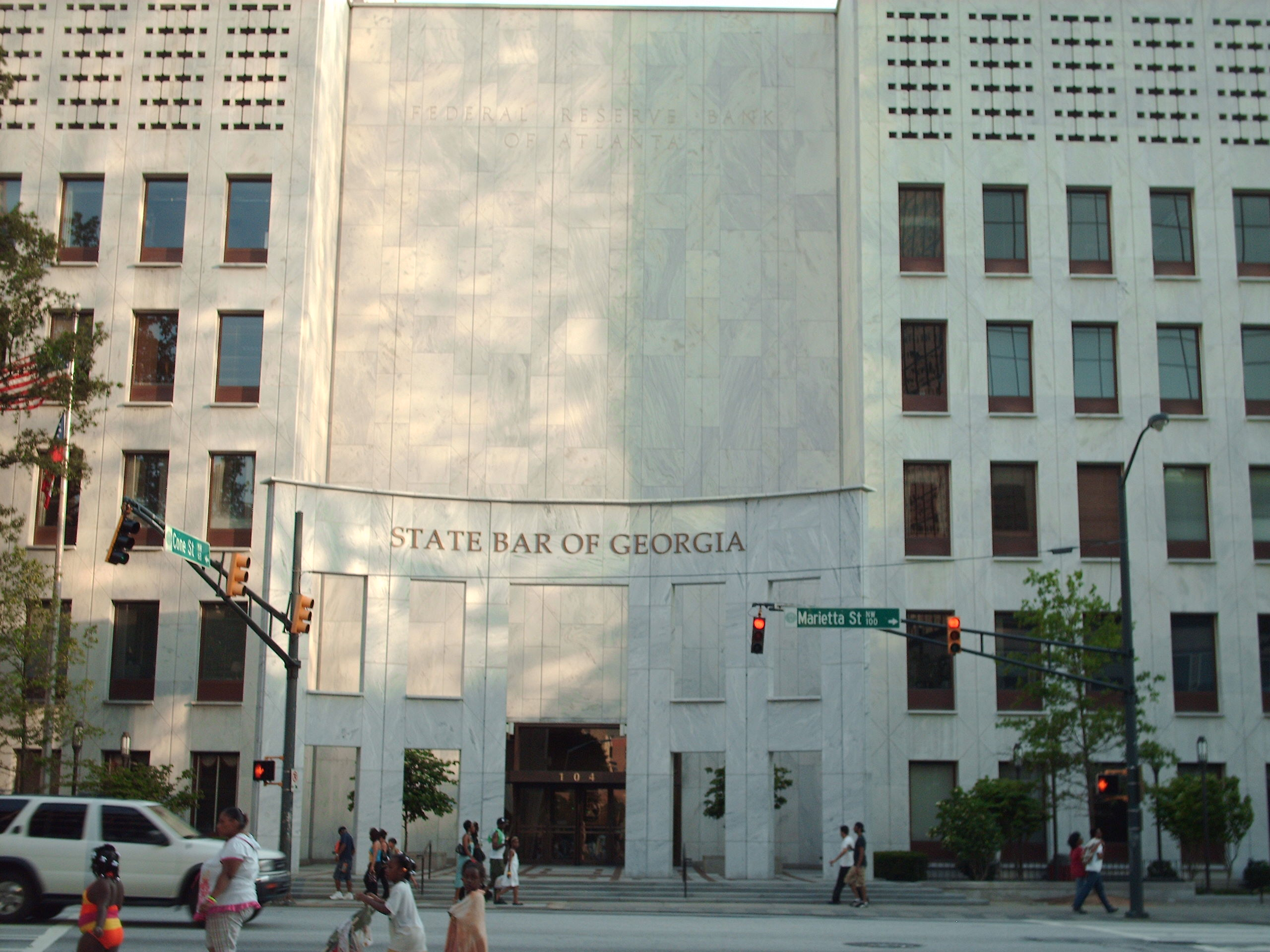
The former Federal Reserve Bank of Atlanta building at 104 Marietta Street NW in downtown Atlanta, now home to the State Bar of Georgia.

The Atlanta Fed is headquartered at 1000 Peachtree Street NE in Midtown Atlanta, occupying a ten-story building completed in 2001. The former headquarters at 104 Marietta Street NW in downtown Atlanta is now occupied by the State Bar of Georgia.

The current headquarters houses the Atlanta Monetary Museum, which features exhibits on the history of money, interactive multimedia exhibits on the Federal Reserve's role in the economy, and a view of the bank's automated vault and cash-processing areas.

== Branches ==
- Federal Reserve Bank of Atlanta Birmingham Branch Office
- Federal Reserve Bank of Atlanta Jacksonville Branch Office
- Federal Reserve Bank of Atlanta Miami Branch Office
- Federal Reserve Bank of Atlanta New Orleans Branch Office
- Federal Reserve Bank of Atlanta Nashville Branch Office

== See also ==
- Federal Reserve Act
- Federal Reserve Bank
- Federal Reserve Branches
- Federal Reserve Districts
- Federal Reserve System
- Structure of the Federal Reserve System
