= Federal Reserve Bank of Atlanta Jacksonville Branch =

Branch of the Federal Reserve Bank of Atlanta

Agency overview
- Jurisdiction: Sixth Federal Reserve District
- Headquarters: 800 Water Street; Jacksonville, Florida 32204
- Parent agency: Federal Reserve Bank of Atlanta
- Website: www.atlantafed.org/who-we-are/visit/jacksonville-branch

The Federal Reserve Bank of Atlanta Jacksonville Branch Office is one of the five branch offices of the Federal Reserve Bank of Atlanta. The Jacksonville branch is part of the Sixth Federal Reserve District.

Federal Reserve System Sixth District

The Jacksonville Branch currently conducts tours by appointment. Admission is free.

== History ==
The Jacksonville branch opened in 1918, the same year as the Birmingham branch, making both among the earliest branches established in the Sixth Federal Reserve District following the pioneering New Orleans branch of 1915. Since its founding, the branch has relocated four times, each move into successively larger quarters to accommodate growth in its operations.

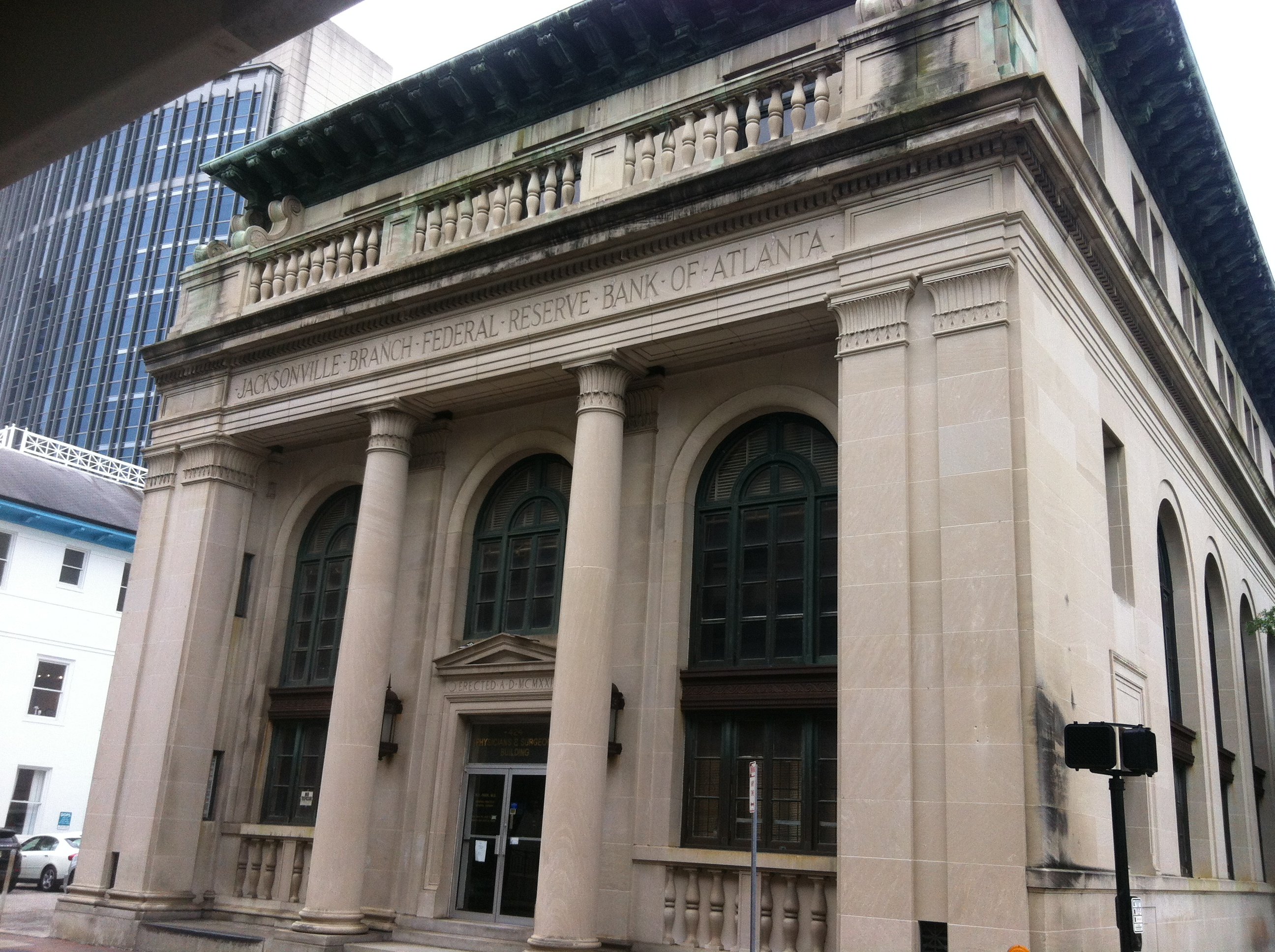
1924 Federal Reserve Bank of Atlanta Jacksonville Branch Office, located at the corner of Hogan and Church Street. Designed by Henrietta Cuttino Dozier and A. Ten Eyck Brown

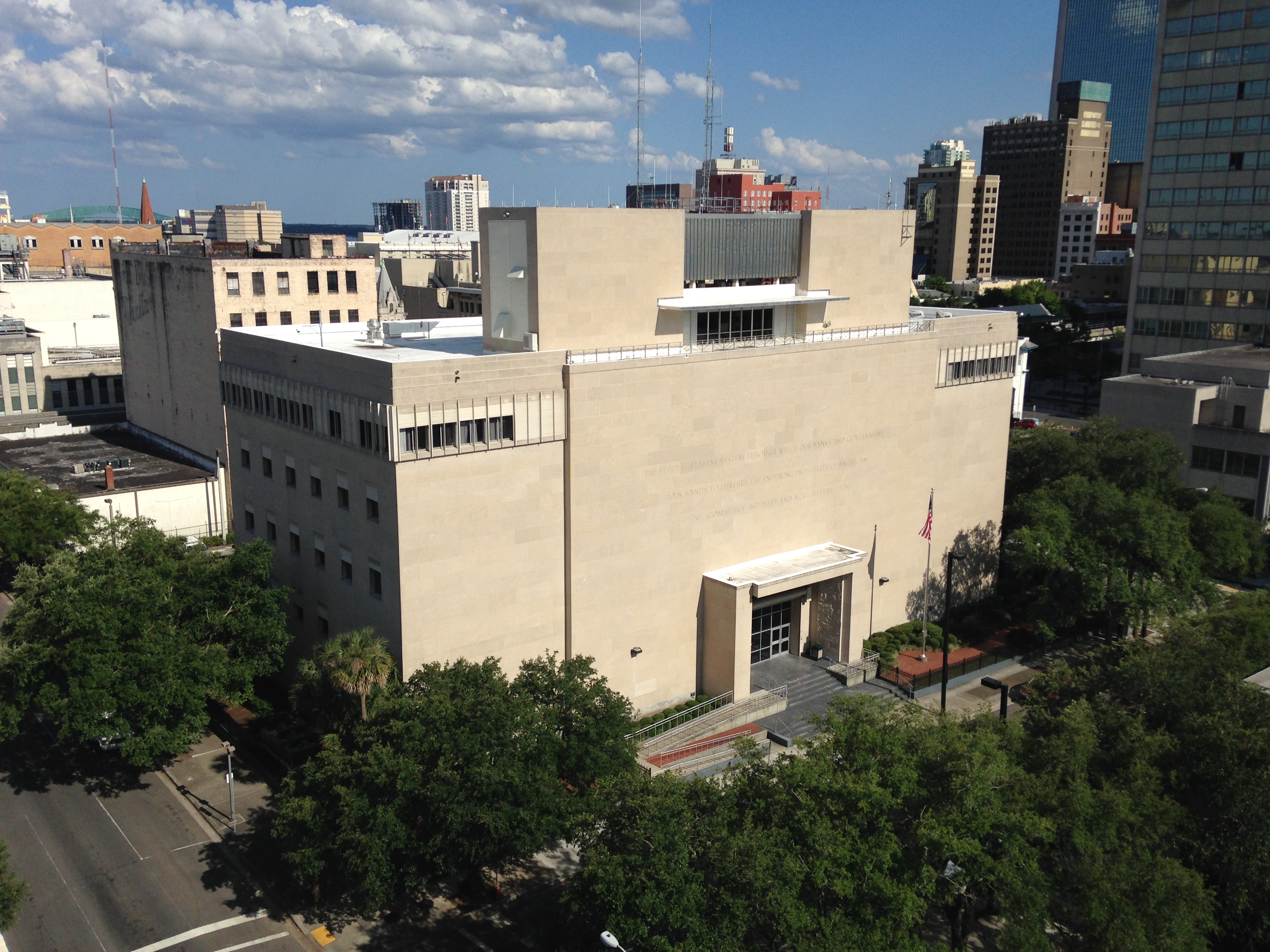
Former Federal Reserve Bank of Atlanta Jacksonville Branch Office, located at the corner of Julia and Ashley Streets

A purpose-built facility at the corner of Hogan and Church Streets, designed by architects Henrietta Cuttino Dozier and A. Ten Eyck Brown, opened in 1924. The branch vacated that building in 1952 when a newer facility was constructed. In 1927, the branch appointed Mary E. Mahon as assistant cashier, making her the first woman officer in the history of the Federal Reserve Bank of Atlanta.

== Board of directors ==
The Jacksonville Branch board of directors has seven members: four appointed by the Atlanta board of directors, and three appointed by the Board of Governors. Branch directors provide economic information from their industries and the branch territory to the Atlanta Fed's president and head office directors, who use that information in discussing monetary policy options and making discount rate recommendations. The following people are on the board of directors as of June 2026:

=== Appointed by the Board of Governors ===
Name	Title	Term expires
Edward A. Moratin	President, Lift Orlando, Orlando	2026
Bemetra Simmons	President and CEO, Tampa Bay Partnership, Tampa	2027
Lisa Palmer	President and CEO, Regency Centers Corporation, Jacksonville	2028

=== Appointed by the Atlanta board of directors ===
Name	Title	Term expires
Dana Kilborne	CEO, Cypress Capital Group; President and CEO, Cypress Bank and Trust, Melbourne	2026
Brian Wolfburg	President and CEO, VyStar Credit Union, Jacksonville	2027
Christy Budnick	Chair, Berkshire Hathaway HomeServices Florida Network Realty, Atlantic Beach	2027
R. Andrew Watts	Executive Vice President, CFO, and Treasurer, Brown & Brown Inc., Daytona Beach	2028

== See also ==
- Federal Reserve Act
- Federal Reserve System
- Federal Reserve Bank
- Federal Reserve Districts
- Federal Reserve Branches
- Federal Reserve Bank of Atlanta
- Federal Reserve Bank of Atlanta Birmingham Branch Office
- Federal Reserve Bank of Atlanta Miami Branch Office
- Federal Reserve Bank of Atlanta New Orleans Branch Office
- Federal Reserve Bank of Atlanta Nashville Branch Office
- Architecture of Jacksonville
