= Cheryl Venable =

American business executive

- Born: Missouri, United States
- Education: Saint Louis University (BBA, MBA)
- Occupations: Business executive, central banker
- Employer: Federal Reserve System
- Title: Interim President and CEO and First Vice President and Chief Operating Officer of the Federal Reserve Bank of Atlanta
- Term: March 1, 2026 – present
- Predecessor: Raphael Bostic

Cheryl Venable is an American business executive and central banker serving as the interim president and chief executive officer, as well as the first vice president and chief operating officer, of the Federal Reserve Bank of Atlanta. Her professional career spans over three decades within the Federal Reserve System, where she has specialized in financial technology, central bank payment operations, and macroprudential policy.

Venable is notable for her national operational leadership during the deployment of the FedNow instant payment infrastructure, as well as her assumption of the Atlanta Fed's seat on the Federal Open Market Committee (FOMC) as a nonvoting alternate member during the 2026 cycle.

== Early life and education ==
Venable is a native of Missouri. She attended Saint Louis University, where she earned both a Bachelor of Business Administration and a Master of Business Administration.

== Career ==
=== Early Federal Reserve career (1991–2010) ===
Venable entered the Federal Reserve System in 1991 as a management trainee within the Accounting and Payment System Risk Department at the Federal Reserve Bank of St. Louis. In 1996, she transferred to the Federal Reserve Bank of Minneapolis, taking on roles of increasing responsibility including senior vice president over FedACH operations and automation. During her tenure in Minneapolis, she also led the Ninth District's Information Technology Division and served on its management committee.

=== Payments operations and FedNow rollout (2010–2024) ===
In 2010, Venable joined the Federal Reserve Bank of Atlanta as the chief information officer for the Retail Payments Office (RPO). She was promoted to senior vice president and RPO product manager in 2011, and was named an executive vice president in 2016.

In 2021, Venable was appointed executive vice president and chief of payments operations for Federal Reserve Financial Services (FRFS). In this system-wide capacity, she led the operational teams responsible for the central bank's retail and wholesale payment frameworks, including FedACH, check processing, and wholesale services (comprising the Fedwire Funds Service, Securities, and the National Settlement Service). Her tenure directly coincided with the final structural design, testing, and 2023 public rollout of the FedNow Service, which marked the Federal Reserve's first major new payments rail infrastructure since the 1970s. Concurrently, she chaired the Federal Reserve’s System-wide Business Technology Council for two and a half years.

=== Atlanta Fed executive leadership (2024–present) ===
Venable was named first vice president and chief operating officer of the Atlanta Fed effective August 1, 2024, succeeding the retiring André T. Anderson and taking over day-to-day corporate operations across the Sixth District's Atlanta headquarters and its five regional branches.

Following the retirement of Raphael Bostic, Venable assumed the duties of interim president and chief executive officer of the Atlanta Fed effective March 1, 2026, while a comprehensive national search for a permanent successor was conducted by the bank's board of directors. In this capacity, she assumed responsibilities for monetary policy and represents the Sixth District on the Federal Open Market Committee as a nonvoting alternate member. CNBC reported that the search had extended into its seventh month as of June 2026, citing people familiar with the process who said it had been paused in part to allow newly appointed Federal Reserve Chairman Kevin Warsh to oversee the appointment.

On May 12, 2026, Venable published her first major policy message as interim president, titled "Welcome to the Whirlwind," in which she advocated for a macroprudential "wait-and-see" approach to interest rates, citing renewed global supply chain and oil disruptions originating from the Middle East that risked stoking inflation while impacting structural balance in the domestic labor market.

== Board and civic memberships ==
Outside of her central banking responsibilities, Venable served on the board of directors for the Visiting Nurse Health System in Atlanta for nearly a decade, including a term as the non-profit organization's board chair from 2019 through 2021. According to her mandatory system disclosures, she joined the board of directors for the Midtown Improvement District in Atlanta in April 2025 and maintains active civic involvement with the Grady Health Foundation.
