= Nashville Financial Historic District =

Historic district (NRHP) in Nashville, Tennessee

- U.S. National Register of Historic Places
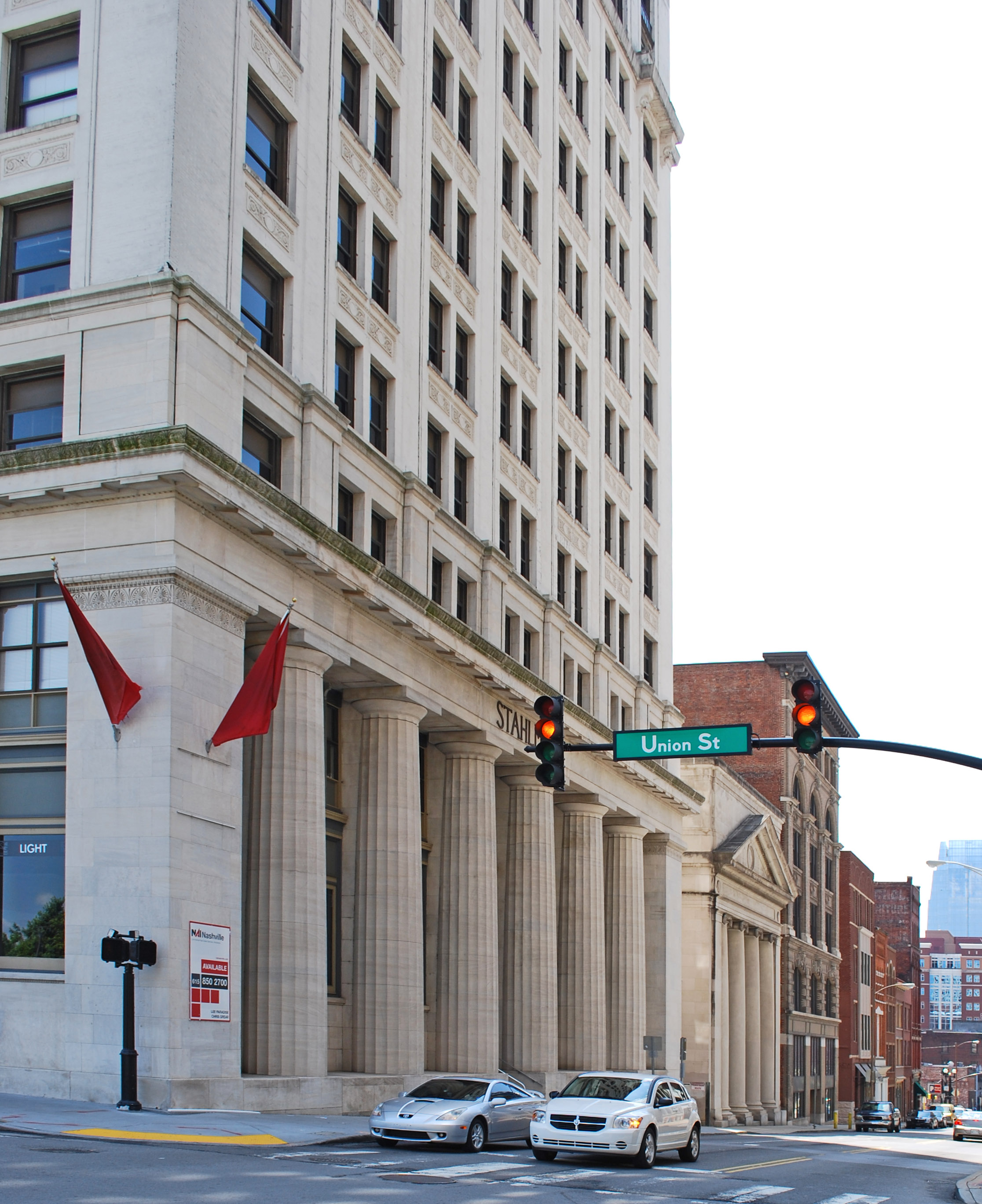
- Nashville Financial Historic District

- Location within Tennessee Location within the United States
- Location: Nashville, Tennessee
- Coordinates: 36.165833°N 86.778333°W
- Built: 1900-1924; 1925-1949; 1950-1974
- Architect: Asmus & Clark, A. Ten Eyck Brown; Henry C. Hibbs
- Architectural style: Classic revival
- Website: Old Financial District
- NRHP reference No.: 02000232
- Added to NRHP: March 20, 2002

The Nashville Financial Historic District or Wall Street of the South is a historic district in downtown Nashville, Tennessee. It was listed on the National Register of Historic Places listings in Davidson County, Tennessee (NRHP) on March 20, 2002.

== History ==
Buildings in the district were constructed from 1900-1974. The district boundaries are Third Avenue North and Union Street. The district was once known as the Wall Street of the South because it has four large bank buildings. The buildings are: the 1926 Nashville Bank and Trust Company building designed by architectural firm Asmus & Clark, The opulent Nashville Trust building, the 1926 American Trust Building designed by Henry C. Hibbs and the 1922 Federal Reserve Bank Building. The district helped Nashville to become a regional banking center.
