= Small Enterprise Assistance Funds =

SEAF
- Formerly: Small Enterprise Assistance Funds
- Industry: Impact Investing
- Founded: 1989; 37 years ago
- Founder: Hubertus van der Vaart; Tom Gibson
- Headquarters: Washington, D.C., United States
- Number of locations: 20+ offices (2017)
- Area served: Worldwide
- Key people: Hubertus van der Vaart (Executive Chairman)
- AUM: ▲$600+ million (2017)
- Number of employees: 145 (2017)
- Website: seaf.com

SEAF (Small Enterprise Assistance Funds) is an international investment management group that provides growth capital and business assistance to small and medium enterprises (SMEs) in emerging and transition markets underserved by traditional sources of capital.

== History ==
Founded in 1989 as the private equity investment subsidiary of the international development organization CARE International, Small Enterprise Assistance Funds ("SEAF") evolved in 1995 into an independent organization specializing in the sponsorship and management of investment funds targeting growth-oriented, emerging enterprises located in countries underserved by traditional sources of capital.

SEAF has managed or is managing 36 Funds across more than 30 countries with over US$1 billion in aggregate committed capital, of which over US$600 million has been invested through over 400 investments in SMEs, with more than 300 completed exits (through December 31, 2017). Investors in SEAF-sponsored funds represent a cross-section of public and private institutions, including multilateral financial institutions, private foundations, pension funds, insurance companies, family offices, banks, and other independent financial institutions.

SEAF employs over 140 investment professionals worldwide within a network of 20+ regional offices.

== Impact on development ==
Small and medium enterprises (SMEs) are often overlooked and referred to as the "missing middle" in the developing world. Data results, analysis, and case highlights (reports can be found below in the "Publications" section) demonstrate how SMEs can generate employment opportunities in their local communities, serve as links to regional and international markets for smaller local suppliers, and address market deficiencies and customer needs that would otherwise go unaddressed.

== Funds ==
Below is a list of SEAF's active and historic funds and the countries in which they operate:

=== Global ===
- SEAF Flex Fund
- SEAF SME Debt Facility
- SEAF Global SME Fund

=== Central and Eastern European Funds ===
- Caresbac Polska (Closed)
  - Poland
- Baltics Small Equity Fund (Closed)
  - Estonia
  - Latvia
  - Lithuania
- SEAF Macedonia (Closed)
- SEAF Macedonia II Fund
- Central/Eastern Europe Growth Fund
- SEAF Trans-Balkan Fund (Closed)
  - Bulgaria through the Trans-Balkan Bulgaria Fund (Closed)
  - Romania through the Trans-Balkan Romania Fund (Closed)
  - Croatia through the SEAF Croatia (Closed)
- SEAF South Balkan Fund
  - Serbia
  - Montenegro
  - Macedonia
- Georgia Regional Development Fund
- SEAF Impact Serbia Fund
- SEAF Caucasus Growth Fund
  - Armenia
  - Azerbaijan
  - Georgia

=== Latin American Funds ===
- SEAF Colombia Agribusiness Fund (Dual Fund Structure)
- Trans-Andean Fund (Closed)
  - Peru through the Fondo Transandino Peru Fund (Closed)
  - Colombia through the Fondo Transandino Colombia Fund
- Latam Growth Fund (Closed)
- Latam Peru Fund (Closed)

=== Asian Funds ===
- Central Asia Small Enterprise Fund (Closed)
  - Uzbekistan
  - Kazakhstan
  - Kyrgyz Republic
  - Tajikistan
  - Turkmenistan
- Sichuan Small Investment Fund
  - China
- SEAF India Investment Growth Fund (Closed)
- SEAF India Agribusiness Fund (Dual Fund Structure)
- SEAF Bangladesh Ventures LLC
- SEAF Blue Waters Growth Fund Limited
  - Vietnam
  - Cambodia
- Afghan Growth Finance
  - Afghanistan

== CEED ==
In 2006, SEAF set up the Center for Entrepreneurship and Executive Development (CEED), a legacy institution of United States Agency for International Development (USAID) and SEAF, born out of USAID grant funding in SME equity investments made by SEAF throughout the Balkans, and EBRD in Slovenia. CEED centers provide business development training and technical assistance to entrepreneurs in emerging markets.

== Notes ==
As of this edit, this article uses content from "Our history", which is licensed in a way that permits reuse under the Creative Commons Attribution-ShareAlike 3.0 Unported License, but not under the GFDL. All relevant terms must be followed.
