= John C. Williams (economist) =

American economist (born 1962)

John Williams
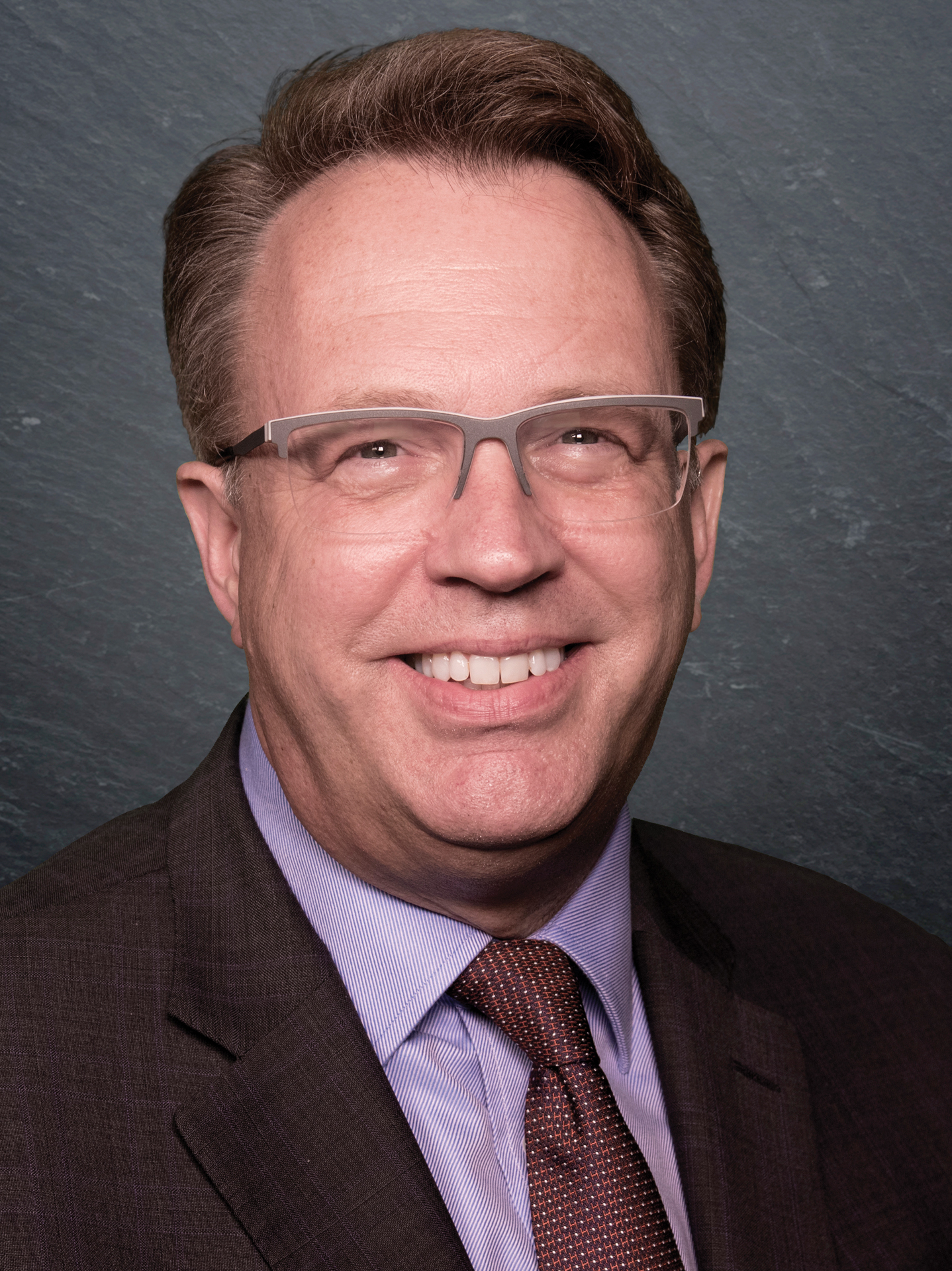

11th President of the Federal Reserve Bank of New York
- Incumbent
- Assumed office June 18, 2018
- Vice President: Michael Strine; Naureen Hassan; Sushmita Shukla
- Preceded by: William C. Dudley

12th President of the Federal Reserve Bank of San Francisco
- In office March 1, 2011 – June 18, 2018
- Preceded by: Janet Yellen
- Succeeded by: Mary C. Daly

Personal details
- Born: John Carroll Williams; June 12, 1962 (age 64) Sacramento, California, U.S.
- Education: University of California, Berkeley (BA); London School of Economics (MSc); Stanford University (PhD)

John Carroll Williams (born June 12, 1962) is an American economist. He has been the president and CEO of the Federal Reserve Bank of New York since June 2018. He previously served as president and CEO of the Federal Reserve Bank of San Francisco from 2011 to 2018. As president of the Federal Reserve Bank of New York, he is ex officio vice chairman of the Federal Open Market Committee.

== Early life and education ==
Williams was born in 1962 in Sacramento, California. His father was a state attorney. Williams attended Encina High School in Sacramento County.

He earned a B.A. from the University of California, Berkeley, in 1984. He received a Master of Science in economics from the London School of Economics in 1989. He completed a Ph.D. in economics at Stanford University in 1994.

== Career ==
Williams began his career in 1994 as an economist at the Board of Governors of the Federal Reserve System.

In 2002 he joined the Federal Reserve Bank of San Francisco as a research advisor, and by 2009 had become its executive vice president and director of research. He took office as president and CEO of the Federal Reserve Bank of San Francisco in 2011.

Williams became president and CEO of the Federal Reserve Bank of New York on June 18, 2018.

Williams' public speaking often focuses on the natural rate of interest (also called "R-star"), sustainable growth, and the "new normal" of economics.

== Other positions held ==
From 2001 to 2005, Williams was associate editor of the Journal of Economic Dynamics and Control. From 2005 to 2008, he was associate editor of the American Economic Review. From 2011 to 2016, he was the managing editor of the International Journal of Central Banking.

Additionally, from 1999 through 2000 he served as senior economist at the Council of Economic Advisers, and in 2008 he was a lecturer at Stanford University Graduate School of Business.

== Personal life ==
Williams is married to Audrey Lyndon, professor of health equity and associate dean of faculty affairs at the Rory Meyers College of Nursing at New York University. They have two sons and reside in New York City.

Other offices
Preceded by Janet Yellen	President of the Federal Reserve Bank of San Francisco; 2011–2018	Succeeded by Mary C. Daly
Preceded by William C. Dudley	President of the Federal Reserve Bank of New York; 2018–present	Incumbent
