= Federal Reserve Bank of San Francisco =

Member Bank of Federal Reserve

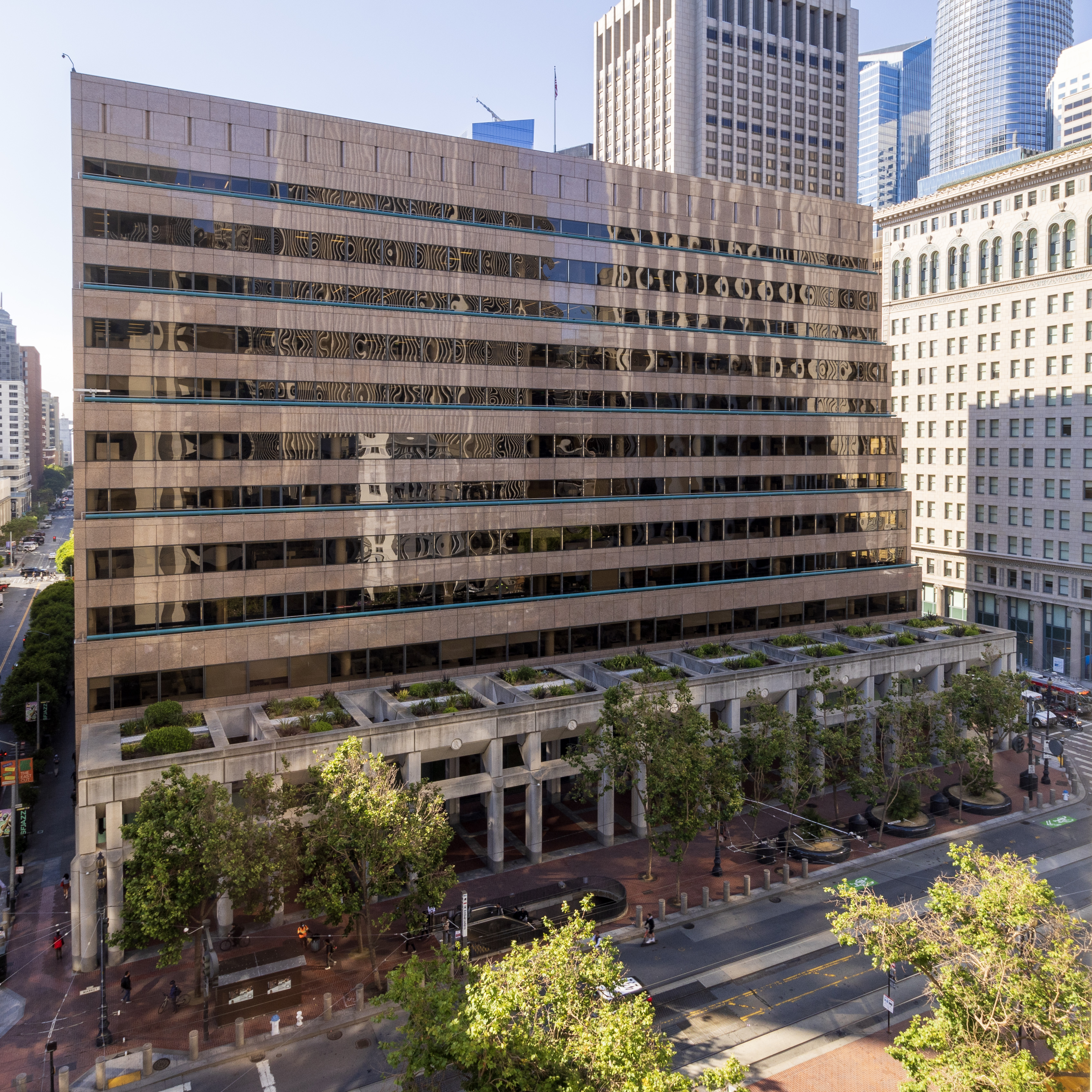
- The Federal Reserve Bank of San Francisco in 2025
- Central bank of: Twelfth District: Alaska; American Samoa; Arizona; California; Guam; Hawaii; Idaho; Nevada; Northern Mariana Islands; Oregon; Utah; Washington
- Headquarters: 101 Market Street; San Francisco, California, U.S.
- Established: May 18, 1914 (112 years ago)
- President: Mary C. Daly
- Website: frbsf.org
- The Federal Reserve Bank of San Francisco is one of 12 regional banks that make up the Federal Reserve System

The Federal Reserve Bank of San Francisco (informally referred to as the San Francisco Fed) is one of the twelve Federal Reserve Banks of the United States. It is responsible for the Twelfth District of the Federal Reserve System, which encompasses nine western states—Alaska, Arizona, California, Hawaii, Idaho, Nevada, Oregon, Utah, and Washington—plus the Northern Mariana Islands, American Samoa, and Guam. The San Francisco Fed has branch offices in Los Angeles, Portland, Salt Lake City, and Seattle. It also has a cash processing center in Phoenix.

The twelfth district is the nation's largest by area and population, covering 1.3 million sq mi (3.4 million km^{2}), or 36% of the nation's area, and 60 million people. The Federal Reserve Bank of San Francisco is the second-largest by assets held, after New York. In 2004 the San Francisco Fed processed 20.8 billion currency notes and 1.5 billion commercial checks.

The San Francisco Fed's online American Currency Exhibit includes examples ranging from a 1776 Continental one-third-dollar note to a 1914 $10,000 Federal Reserve note.

Mary C. Daly serves as the president and CEO as of October 1, 2018. Notable former Presidents include John C. Williams (2011–2018), who now holds the same role at the Federal Reserve Bank of New York and is Vice Chairman of the Federal Open Market Committee, as well as Janet Yellen (2004–2010), who held the role of Chair of the Board of Governors from 2014 to 2018.

== History ==
The San Francisco Federal Reserve Bank opened for business in rented quarters at the rear of the Merchants National Bank on November 16, 1914, in order to make the reserve provisions of the Federal Reserve Act. In 1924, the San Francisco staff moved out of temporary locations and into the Bank's newly built headquarters at 400 Sansome Street, a location that it would occupy for the next 60 years. In 1983, the bank relocated to 101 Market Street.

Federal reserve districts, of which the 12th is largest and most populous

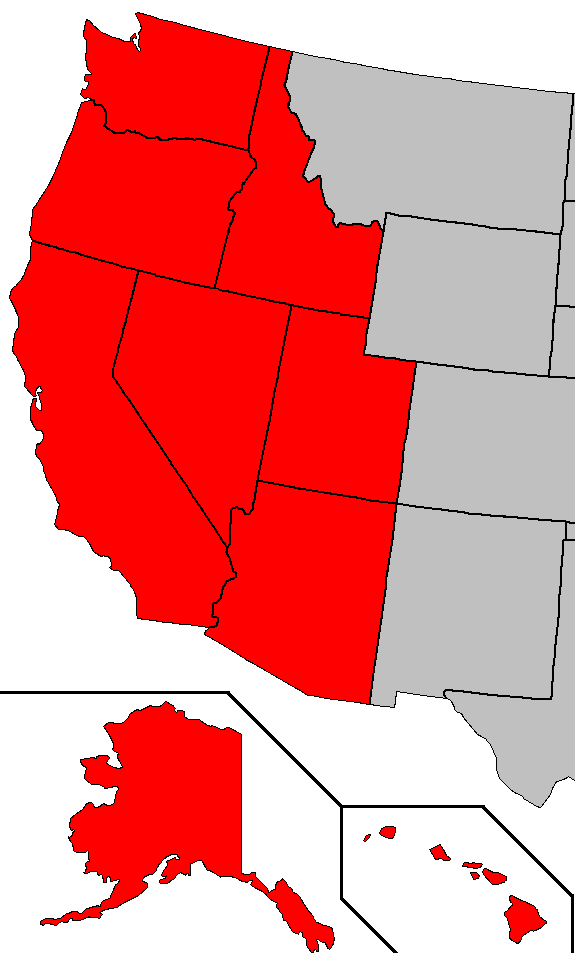
Map of the Twelfth District

=== Branches ===
After the bank's creation, a number of branches were opened to provide services across the district.

- Spokane branch (opened July 26, 1917; closed 1938)
- Seattle branch (opened September 19, 1917)
- Portland branch (opened October 1, 1917; ceased cash operations 2005; currently a depot site)
- Salt Lake City branch (opened April 1, 1918)
- Los Angeles branch (opened January 2, 1920)

Although not a stand-alone branch, the bank opened the Phoenix Cash Processing Center in 2001.

== Buildings ==
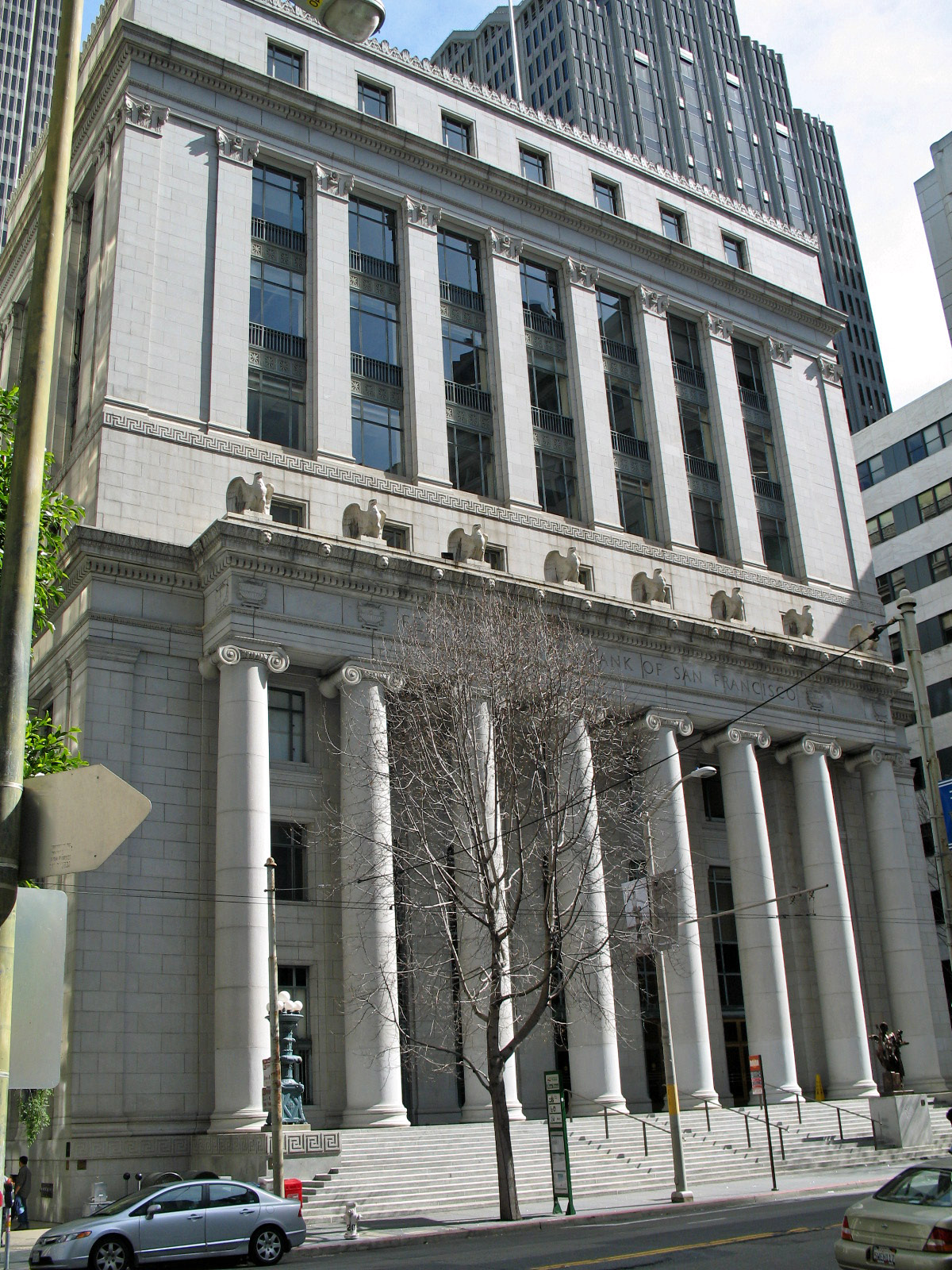
The façade of the old Federal Reserve Bank of San Francisco at 400 Sansome Street

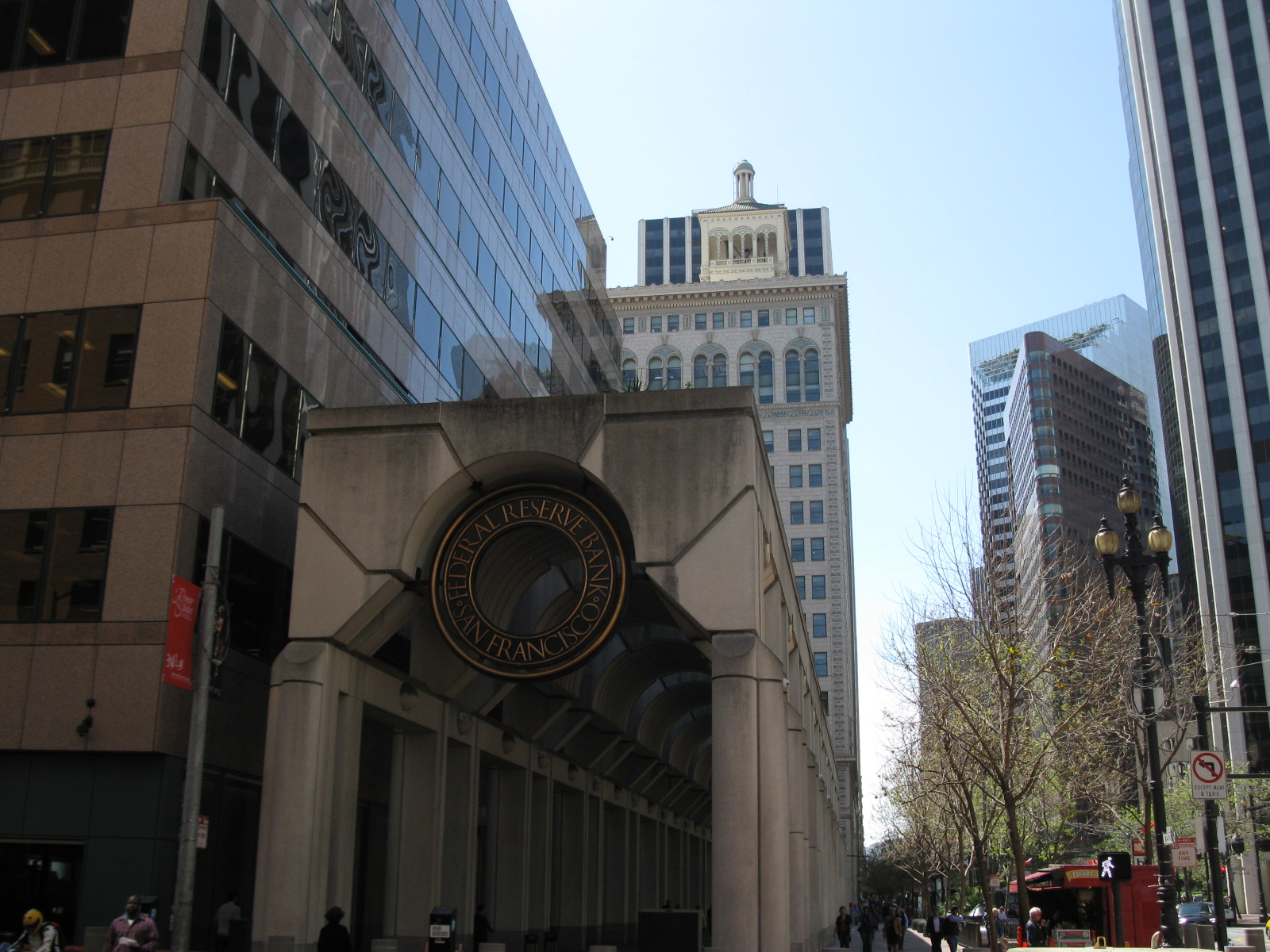
Arcade of the current building along Market Street

The old headquarters building of the bank, designed by George W. Kelham, has an Ionic colonnade that is pure Beaux-Arts, while the upper building is in the new Moderne fashion of 1924. The lobby with murals by Jules Guerin who created the palette for the 1915 Panama-Pacific International Exhibition. In 1983 the bank relocated to larger and more modern facilities on 101 Market Street as the 400 Sansome Street location was sold to private developers who rented out the space. Prominent law firm Orrick Herrington & Sutcliffe was headquartered in the building until 2002 when the firm moved out of the space. The building continues to be owned by private developers and current tenants include the Bar Association of San Francisco. It is listed on the National Register of Historic Places (NRHP).

The old 1929 Los Angeles branch building is also NRHP-listed. In 1987 the branch relocated to an adjacent new building at the corner of South Grand Ave and Olympic Blvd.

From 1951 to 2008, the Seattle branch was headquartered at the Federal Reserve Bank Building in Downtown Seattle, which had been built in 1951 for the branch and is listed on the NRHP.

== Board of directors ==
The following people serve on the board of directors as of June 2025:

Name	Title	Class	Term Expires
Jeffrey Newgard	Chairman, president, and CEO, Bank of Idaho, Idaho Falls, Idaho	A	2025
Clint Stein	CEO, Umpqua Bank, Tacoma, Washington	A	2027
Laura Lee Stewart	President and CEO, Sound Community Bank and Sound Financial Bancorporation, Seattle, Washington	A	2026
Maritza Diaz	CEO, ITJ USA, San Diego, California	B	2025
Karin Kimbrough	Chief Economist, LinkedIn, Sunnyvale, California	B	2026
Jack Sinclair	CEO, Sprouts Farmers Market, Phoenix, Arizona	B	2024
Russell Childs (chair)	President and CEO, SkyWest, Inc., St. George, Utah	C	2026
Mario Cordero	CEO, Port of Long Beach, Long Beach, California	C	2025
Pallavi Mehta Wahi (deputy chair)	Seattle Managing Partner, K&L Gates LLP, Seattle, Washington	C	2027

== Governors and presidents ==
The position was installed under the title of "Governor" until the Banking Act of 1935 abolished the dual role of governor and agent and created a single leadership role – president.

#	Portrait	CEO	Life span	Term start	Term end	Tenure length	Ref
Governors
1		Archibald C. Kains	1865–1944	November 25, 1914	July 5, 1917	2 years, 222 days	
2		James K. Lynch*	1857–1919	August 7, 1917	April 26, 1919	1 year, 262 days	
3		John U. Calkins	1863–1954	May 6, 1919	February 29, 1936	16 years, 299 days	
Presidents
4		William A. Day	1876–1951	April 1, 1936	December 31, 1945	9 years, 274 days	
5		Ira Clerk*	1885–1946	January 1, 1946	September 28, 1946	270 days	
6		C. E. Earhart	1890–1982	October 17, 1946	February 28, 1956	9 years, 134 days	
7		Hermann N. Mangels	1897–1961	March 1, 1956	February 28, 1961	4 years, 364 days	
8		Eliot J. Swan	1911–1998	March 1, 1961	June 1, 1972	11 years, 30 days	
9		John J. Balles†	1921–2005	September 25, 1972	February 1, 1986	13 years, 129 days	
10		Robert T. Parry†	1939-	February 4, 1986	June 1, 2004	18 years, 118 days	
11		Janet Yellen	1946–	June 14, 2004	October 4, 2010	6 years, 112 days	
12		John C. Williams	1962–	March 1, 2011	June 17, 2018	7 years, 108 days	
13		Mary C. Daly	1962-	October 1, 2018	Incumbent	7 years, 359 days	

†	Stepped down due to reaching retirement age
*	Died in office

== See also ==
- Federal Reserve Act
- Federal Reserve System
- Federal Reserve Bank
- Federal Reserve Districts
- Federal Reserve Branches
- Federal Reserve Bank of San Francisco Building (San Francisco, California)
- Structure of the Federal Reserve System
