= Mary C. Daly =

American economist

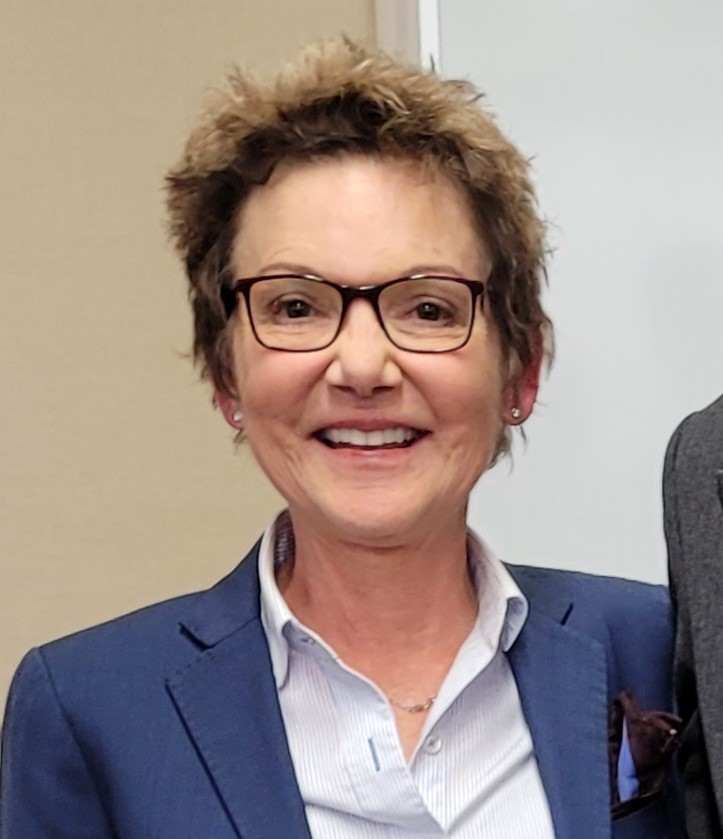

13th President of the Federal Reserve Bank of San Francisco
- Incumbent
- Assumed office October 1, 2018
- Preceded by: John C. Williams

Personal details
- Born: 1962 or 1963 (age 63–64) Ballwin, Missouri, U.S.
- Education: University of Missouri, Kansas City (BA); University of Illinois, Urbana-Champaign (MA); Syracuse University (PhD)

Mary Colleen Daly (born 1962/1963) is an American economist, who became the 13th president and chief executive officer of the Federal Reserve Bank of San Francisco on October 1, 2018. She serves on the Federal Reserve's rate-setting Federal Open Market Committee on a rotating basis. Previously, Daly was the executive vice president and director of research of the Federal Reserve Bank of San Francisco, which she joined as an economist in 1996.

Her research is in the fields of macroeconomics and labor economics and focuses on labor force dynamics and on the impacts of monetary and fiscal policy. Her research has examined employment and wage trends, economic growth, economic shocks, Social Security, and disability policy.

== Education and early life ==
Daly was born in Ballwin, Missouri. Her father was a postal worker and her mother was a homemaker. She said, "we were not poor, but we weren't very wealthy, either. And at some point my family just, sort of, imploded. And my siblings went to live with my grandparents and I went to live with friends. And I dropped out of high school." At the time, she was 15 years of age. By age 16, she was living on her own, working at doughnut shops and retailer Target, struggling to scrape together a full-time salary.

Daly went on to earn a GED and eventually a bachelor's degree in economics and philosophy from the University of Missouri-Kansas City in 1985. She later received a master's degree from the University of Illinois Urbana-Champaign in 1987 and a Ph.D in economics from the Maxwell School at Syracuse University in 1994. She completed a post-doctoral fellowship at National Institute of Aging at Northwestern University in 1996.

== Career ==
In 1996, Daly joined the San Francisco Fed as a research economist. She steadily rose through the ranks of the research department, becoming executive vice president and director of research in 2017. Her research has focused on labor market dynamics and the aggregate and distributional impacts of monetary and fiscal policy. She has published work on economic inequality, wage and unemployment dynamics, increasing output through workforce development, and disability and retirement policy.

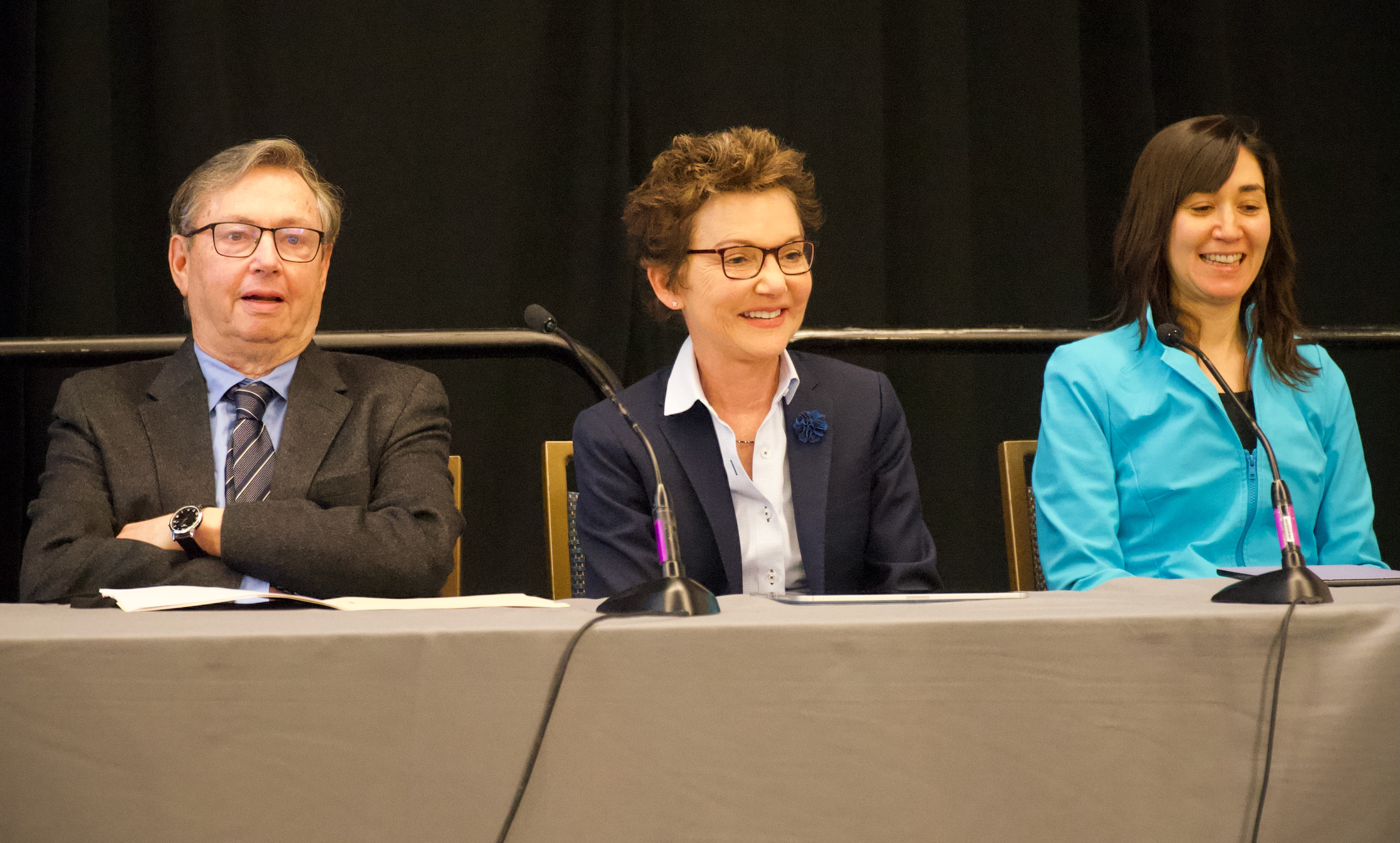
Gertler, Daly, Nakamura at AEA 2025 in San Francisco

Daly considers Janet Yellen a mentor, stating that her career "just kind of exploded" after Yellen was named president of the San Francisco Fed in 2004. (Yellen went on to become the Fed's vice chair in 2010, and later its chair in 2014.)

On October 1, 2018, Daly became the 13th president and chief executive officer of the Federal Reserve Bank of San Francisco, succeeding John C. Williams, who left in June 2018 to become the president and chief executive officer of the Federal Reserve Bank of New York.

=== Other ===
In May 2019, Daly served as the commencement speaker at the 165th commencement of Syracuse University.

== Selected publications ==
- Daly, Mary C., Greg J. Duncan, George A. Kaplan, John W. Lynch (1998). "Macro-to-Micro Linkages in the Relation between Income Inequality and Mortality", The Milbank Quarterly, 76(3), 315–339, doi:10.1111/1468-0009.00094.
- Daly, Mary C., Bart Hobijn, Ayşegül Şahin, Robert G Valletta (2012). "A Search and Matching Approach to Labor Markets: Did the Natural Rate of Unemployment Rise?", Journal of Economic Perspectives, 26(3), 3-26, doi:10.1257/jep.26.3.3.
- Daly, Mary C., Bart Hobijn (2017). "Composition and Aggregate Real Wage Growth", American Economic Review (Papers and Proceedings), 105(7), 349–352, doi:10.1257/aer.p20171075.

== Books ==
- Lifecycle Events and Their Consequences: Job Loss, Family Change, and Declines in Health, Stanford University Press, 2013 (co-edited with Kenneth A. Couch and Julie Zissimopoulus), ISBN 9780804785853.
- The Declining Work and Welfare of People with Disabilities: What Went Wrong and a Strategy for Change, American Enterprise Institute Press, Washington, DC, 2011 (with Richard Burkhauser), ISBN 978-0-8447-7215-8.
- Income Mobility and the Middle Class, American Enterprise Institute Press, Washington, DC, 1996 (with Richard Burkhauser, Amy D. Crews, and Stephen Jenkins), ISBN

== Personal life ==
Daly is the first openly gay woman to lead a regional Federal Reserve bank, joining Federal Reserve Bank of Atlanta President Raphael Bostic, who is also openly gay. She is the second woman to lead the San Francisco Fed.

Daly is married and resides in the San Francisco Bay area.

== See also ==
- Federal Reserve System

Other offices
Preceded by John C. Williams	President of the Federal Reserve Bank of San Francisco; 2018–present	Incumbent
