= Federal Reserve Bank of San Francisco Seattle Branch =

Coordinates: 47°27′14″N 122°14′22″W

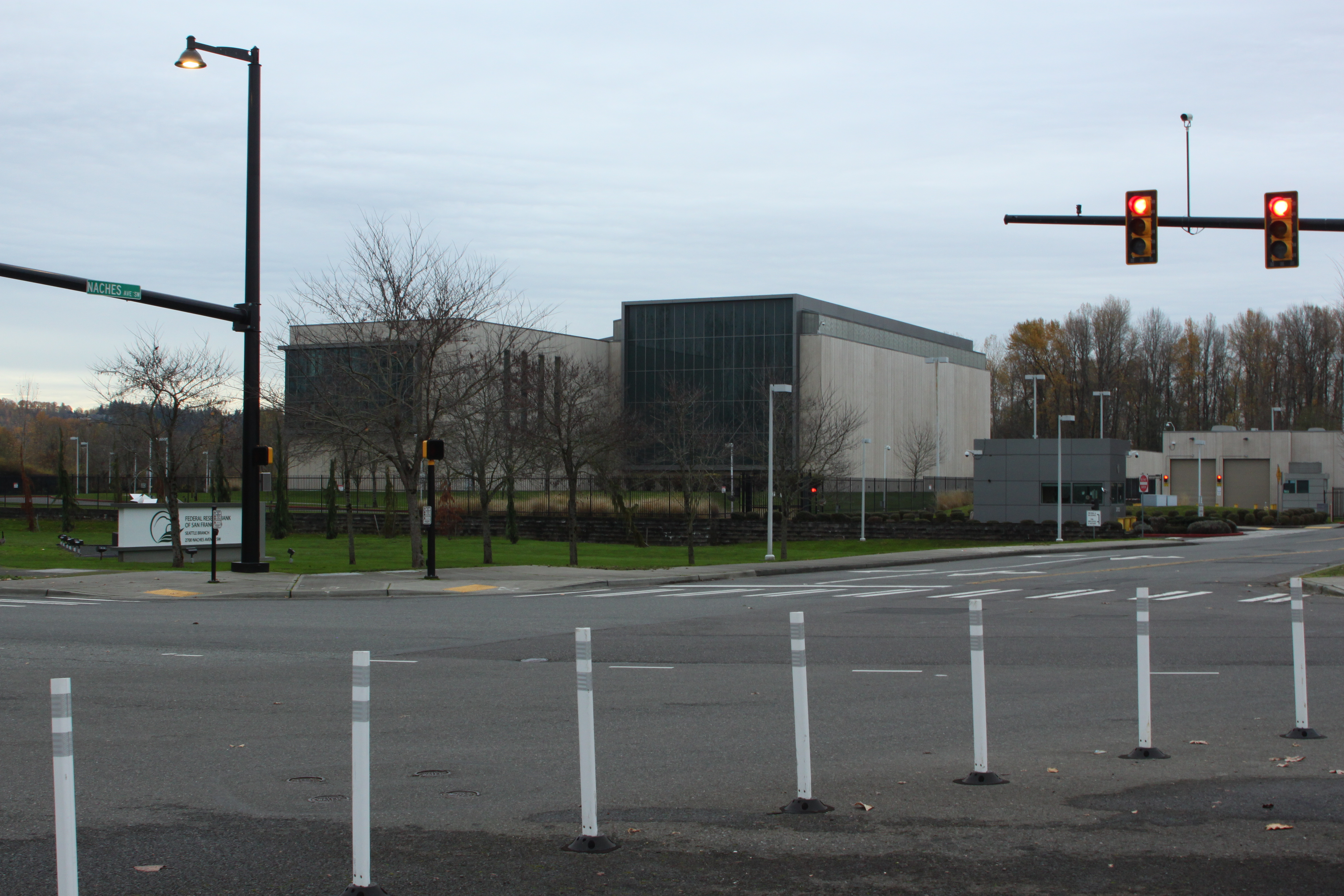
The current headquarters of the branch in Renton

The Federal Reserve Bank of San Francisco Seattle Branch is one of four branches of the Federal Reserve Bank of San Francisco. The branch opened September 19, 1917. In 1938, it absorbed the operations of the Spokane branch and in 2005 took over cash operations from the Portland branch.

The branch is located at 2700 Naches Ave SW in Renton, Washington, a suburb south of Seattle. Until 2008, the branch was headquartered at the Federal Reserve Bank Building in Downtown Seattle, which had been built in 1951 for the branch.

== Current board of directors ==
The following people are on the board of directors as of June 2026:

=== Appointed by the Board of Governors of the Federal Reserve System ===
Appointed by the Board of Governors of the Federal Reserve System
Name	Title	Term expires
Elizabeth Wako (chair of the board)	President and CEO, Swedish Health Services Seattle, Washington	2027
Ryan Gee	CEO, Gee Automotive Companies; Liberty Lake, Washington	2028
John Wolfe	CEO, Northwest Seaport Alliance Tacoma, Washington	2026

=== Appointed by the San Francisco Board of Directors ===
Appointed by the San Francisco Board of Directors
Name	Title	Term expires
Gabriel Kompkoff	President and CEO, Grant Aviation Anchorage, Alaska	2026
Matthew Mullet	President and CEO, FS Bancorp, Inc. and 1st Security Bank of Washington Mountlake Terrace, Washington	2026
Michael Senske	Chairman and CEO, Pearson Packaging Systems Spokane, Washington	2027
Heather Redman	Managing Partner, Flying Fish Partners Seattle, Washington	2028

== See also ==
- Federal Reserve Act
- Federal Reserve System
- Federal Reserve Bank
- Federal Reserve Districts
- Federal Reserve Branches
- Federal Reserve Bank of San Francisco Los Angeles Branch
- Federal Reserve Bank of San Francisco Portland Branch
- Federal Reserve Bank of San Francisco Salt Lake City Branch
- Federal Reserve Bank of San Francisco Building (San Francisco, California)
- Structure of the Federal Reserve System
