= Federal Reserve Bank of San Francisco Portland Branch =

Coordinates: 45°30′43″N 122°40′34″W

The Federal Reserve Bank of San Francisco, Portland Branch, was a branch of the Federal Reserve Bank of San Francisco. The branch ceased cash operations in 2005, after they were absorbed by the Seattle Branch. The Portland location is now a depot site for the storage and transfer of cash. The branch was located in Portland, Oregon, at 907 SW Harvey Milk St.

== See also ==
- Federal Reserve Act
- Federal Reserve System
- Federal Reserve Bank
- Federal Reserve Districts
- Federal Reserve Branches
- Federal Reserve Bank of San Francisco
- Federal Reserve Bank of San Francisco Los Angeles Branch
- Federal Reserve Bank of San Francisco Salt Lake City Branch
- Federal Reserve Bank of San Francisco Seattle Branch
- Federal Reserve Bank of San Francisco Building (San Francisco, California)
- Structure of the Federal Reserve System
