= Naureen Hassan =

American finance executive

CEO at DriveWealth
- Incumbent
- Assumed office August 20, 2025

Personal details
- Education: Princeton University (BA); Stanford University (MBA)

Naureen Hassan is an American finance executive who is the Chief Executive Officer of DriveWealth, a B2B brokerage-as-a-service platform providing investing infrastructure for companies in more than 30 countries. Prior to joining DriveWealth, she was president of UBS Americas. She also was the first vice president and chief operating officer of the Federal Reserve Bank of New York. In this capacity, she was an alternate voting member of the Federal Open Market Committee. Earlier in her career, she was Chief Digital Officer for Morgan Stanley Wealth Management and an Executive Vice President at Charles Schwab, where she led Investor Services segments and was COO of Schwab Bank. She began her career at McKinsey & Company.
