= Federal Reserve Bank Building (Seattle) =

Historic bank building in Seattle, Washington

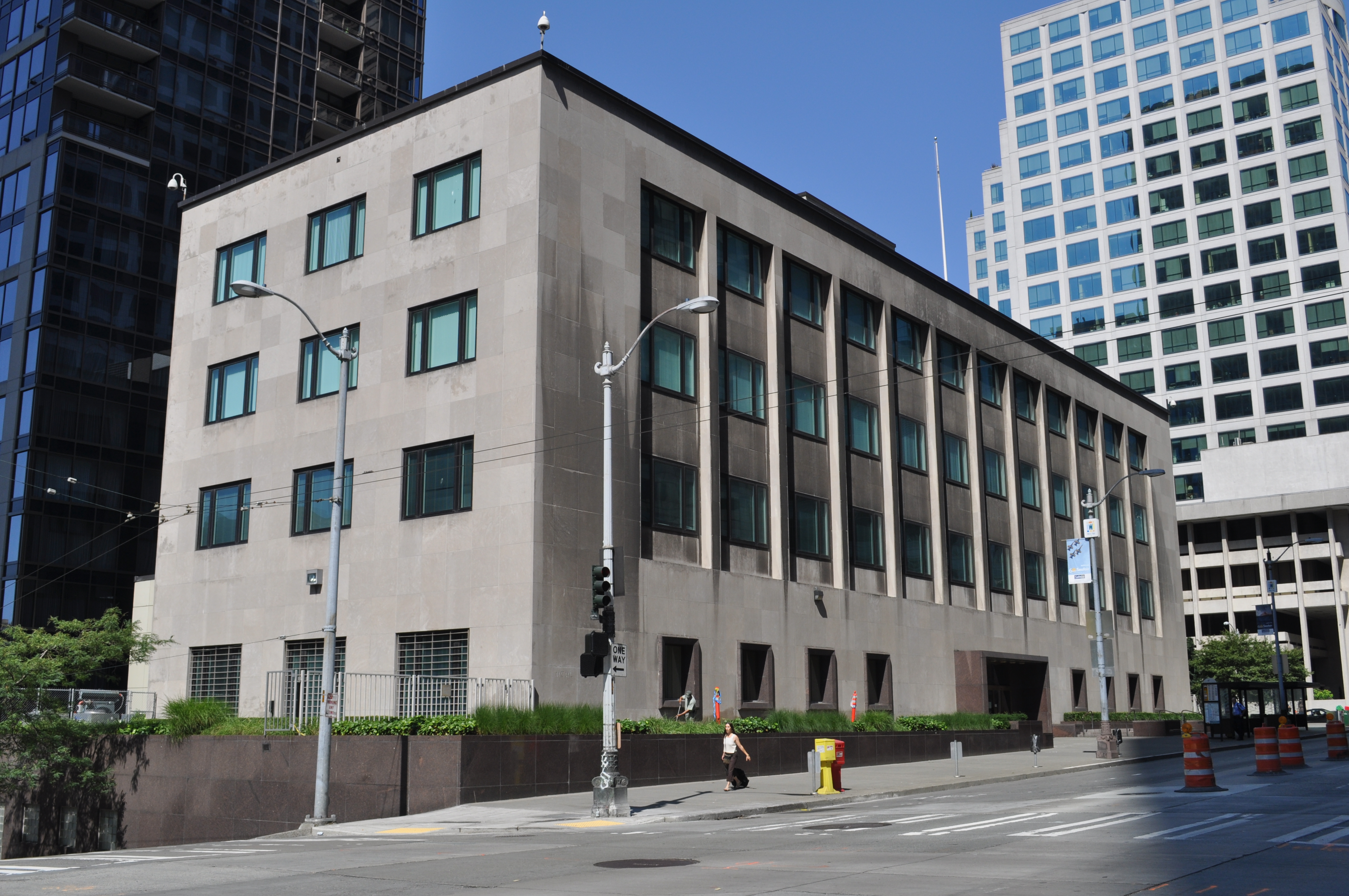
- Looking northwest from Madison Street, 2009

- Location within Downtown Seattle
- Alternative names: Federal Reserve Bank of San Francisco, Seattle Branch

General information
- Status: Completed
- Type: Bank branch
- Architectural style: Modernist
- Location: 1015 2nd Avenue; Seattle, Washington
- Groundbreaking: April 20, 1950
- Completed: 1950
- Opened: January 2, 1951
- Renovated: 2018–2020
- Closed: February 20, 2008
- Client: Federal Reserve Bank of San Francisco
- Owner: Martin Selig Real Estate

Technical details
- Structural system: Steel
- Material: Reinforced concrete
- Floor count: 6
- Floor area: 119,452 sq ft (11,097.5 m^{2})
- Grounds: 25,920 sq ft (2,408 m^{2})

Design and construction
- Architect: William J. Bain
- Architecture firm: NBBJ
- Main contractor: Kuney Johnson Company
- Federal Reserve Bank of San Francisco, Seattle Branch
- U.S. National Register of Historic Places
- Location: Seattle, Washington
- Coordinates: 47°36′19.37″N 122°20′8.86″W
- Built: 1950
- Architect: Naramore, Bain, Brady & Johanson
- Architectural style: Modernist
- NRHP reference No.: 11000985
- Added to NRHP: February 4, 2013

The Federal Reserve Bank Building, also known as the Federal Reserve Bank of San Francisco, Seattle Branch, served as the offices of the Seattle branch of the Federal Reserve Bank of San Francisco for over 50 years, from 1951 to 2008.

The building site has been the subject of several recent redevelopment proposals, including a 2008 plan to demolish the building that was halted after a U.S. District Court ruling. After ownership of the Federal Reserve Bank Building was transferred to the General Services Administration in 2013, it was auctioned to Martin Selig Real Estate in 2015 for $16 million; the firm later announced plans to build a 48-story mixed-use skyscraper atop the existing building, but scaled back the project to only seven floors. The addition was completed in 2020.

The building has been listed on the National Register of Historic Places since 2013.

== Architecture and design ==
The Federal Reserve Bank Building is located on a half-block on the west side of 2nd Avenue between Madison Street and Spring Street. The Modernist building consists of six stories, four above street level and two below, and is composed of structural steel and reinforced concrete. The main facade, facing 2nd Avenue, is clad partially in light gray Indiana limestone; the basement's exterior walls are clad in reddish-brown granite. A small plaza on 2nd Avenue in front of the building's main entrance, setback from the street by 18 feet (5.5 m), features terraced planters finished with polished granite and serve as a plinth.

The two basement floors of the building, located below street level, housed a vault measuring 56 by 56 feet (17 m × 17 m), behind 30-inch-thick (76 cm) reinforced concrete walls and stainless steel doors in the southeast corner; the 5,000-square-foot (460 m^{2}) vault used 335 tonnes (330 long tons; 369 short tons) of material during its construction and once included a circular staircase that was removed in 2005. The basement floors also contained a small parking garage and secure truck lobby accessible via an alleyway, workspaces, and a shooting range for use by security personnel. The first floor features the only public spaces in the building, mainly the lobby and former teller stands, as well as the main entrance to 2nd Avenue; a small rentable space on the first floor was formerly occupied by the Federal Bureau of Investigation in the 1950s and has remained unoccupied since 1990. The upper floors of the building contained open offices and check processing areas, along with employee amenities such as a cafeteria and lounges.

The Federal Reserve Bank Building is one of the earliest surviving works of Seattle-based architecture firm NBBJ, founded in 1943; the lead architect of the project was William J. Bain, one of the firm's founding partners. The building was built to withstand the impact of an atomic bomb and was later retrofitted to be resistant to strong earthquakes. Designed in the Modernist style by Bain, the building recalls the pre-war Moderne style with its solid features and simple facade. The Federal Reserve Bank Building shares some features with the William Kenzo Nakamura United States Courthouse, another federal building in Seattle that was built a decade earlier. The bank building's design has been described as one of "permanence and security", with its "austerity and visual weight [standing out] among the many Modern skyscrapers in the surrounding financial district."

== History ==
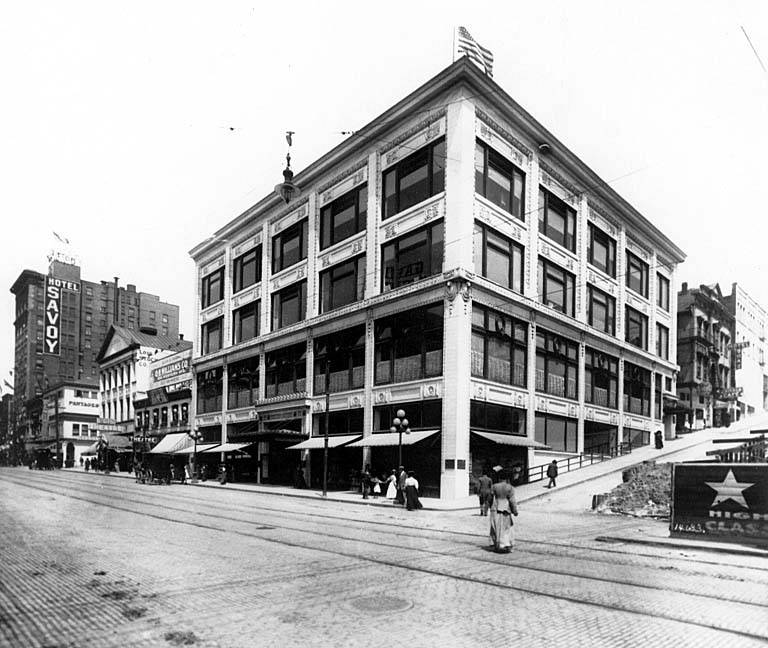
The Baillargeon Building at 2nd and Spring, the former Federal Reserve Bank branch

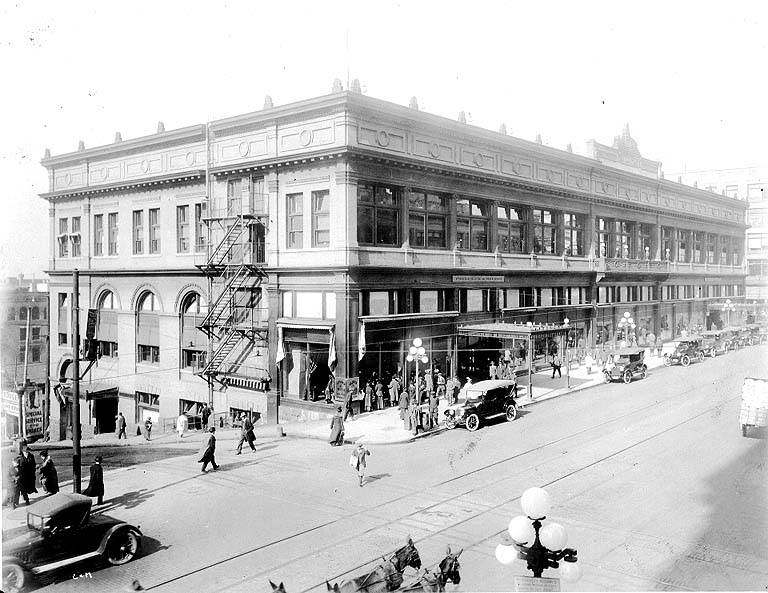
The Rialto Building at 2nd and Madison, demolished for the construction of the new bank building in 1949

The Seattle branch of the Federal Reserve Bank of San Francisco was opened in 1917 and spent its first three decades in leased space at the Baillargeon Building in downtown Seattle. Plans for a permanent building for the Federal Reserve were drawn up in 1948 and approved for construction by the San Francisco board on February 28, 1949. The site at 2nd and Madison was chosen because of its proximity to the city's financial district and would replace the bank-owned Rialto Building, built in 1894 and formerly home to the Seattle Public Library as well one of the first Frederick and Nelson department stores. Designed by local architecture firm NBBJ in the post-war Modernist style, the six-story, steel-frame building would cost $2.5 million (equivalent to $33.45 million in 2025) to construct.

The cornerstone of the building was laid on April 20, 1950, marking the beginning of nine months of construction by the Kuney Johnson Company. The Federal Reserve Bank Building opened on January 2, 1951, with the Federal Reserve sharing the new building with the Federal Bureau of Investigation.

The building underwent some minor alterations during its 50 years of use by the Federal Reserve, consisting mostly of routine maintenance and upgrades. In 1958, the exterior was cleaned and waterproofed at the recommendation of architect William J. Bain, resulting in the discoloring of the limestone cladding. In the 1980s, the building's roof and windows were replaced under the direction of HNTB. Portions of the building were renovated in the 1990s to add new employee amenities, including a cafeteria and conference room.

The 2001 Nisqually earthquake on February 28, 2001, caused minor damage to the structure that was lessened by a seismic retrofit completed in 1996. After the September 11, 2001 attacks, the building was closed to public access and several security features were added to the surrounding perimeter.

The Federal Reserve announced plans in 2004 to move its Seattle branch offices to the Longacres area of Renton on 11 acres (4.5 ha) formerly owned by Boeing. The Seattle building was closed on February 20, 2008, with Federal Reserve vice chairman Donald Kohn noting at the Renton facility's dedication that the old building was "no longer adequate for efficient operations" and did not meet post-2001 security standards. Ownership of the building was transferred to the General Services Administration in April 2012 to prepare for a possible sale.

== Redevelopment ==
During development of the Seattle Monorail Project in the early 2000s, an elevated monorail station at Madison Street on 2nd Avenue was proposed in the plaza of the Federal Reserve Bank Building but was ultimately not built.

=== Initial plan and lawsuit over preservation ===
After the building was vacated in 2008, the Tukwila-based developer Sabey Corporation negotiated a deal with the Federal Reserve Bank to purchase the property for $19.75 million. The sale was opposed by local preservationists, who formed the "Committee for the Preservation of the Seattle Federal Reserve Bank Building" and filed a suit against the Federal Reserve Bank in U.S. District Court on November 21, 2008, to halt the proposed sale. Federal judge Robert S. Lasnik ruled in favor of the preservationists group on March 19, 2010, finding that the Federal Reserve Bank had not followed proper federal disposal procedures for surplus property.

On February 4, 2013, the Federal Reserve Bank Building was placed on the National Register of Historic Places. In 2008, the Federal Reserve Bank sought to designate the building as a Seattle city landmark, but were unable to gain approval from the City of Seattle Landmarks Preservation Board. A second attempt at the city landmark nomination, led by Martin Selig Real Estate, began in 2016.

=== Auction and skyscraper proposal ===
A rendering of Selig's original proposal for a 48-story skyscraper atop the existing Federal Reserve Bank Building, since scaled back.

The General Services Administration (GSA) attempted to dispose of the Federal Reserve Bank Building through its surplus federal property procedures, but by November 2014 received no compelling applications from government agencies and organizations with a public function. A public auction began on December 5, 2014, with a starting bid set at $5 million, and was initially set to end on January 28, 2015; in late January, bids rose to near $10 million between the eight bidders and forced the auction's deadline to be extended into the following month. Bidding closed on February 7, 2015, with a high bid of $16 million submitted by an undisclosed bidder.

In April 2015, it was announced that the winning bidder of the auction was Martin Selig Real Estate. The firm announced plans to build a 31-story office tower, designed by Perkins and Will, and incorporating the existing building as the skyscraper's podium with a 3-story winter garden separating the historic building from the addition.

One of the unsuccessful bids came from Seattle Public Schools, who had proposed renovating the building into an elementary school in 2014, the first downtown school in 65 years. Initially, the district applied to the GSA in July 2014 through the United States Department of Education to acquire the property, but were rejected by the latter over the tentative nature of the application; the school board later voted in November 2014 against submitting a second application over the $50 million cost and 3-year deadline for renovations. The district was, however, allowed to participate in the January 2015 auction and submitted an opening bid of $1 million; Seattle Public Schools was the first bidder to drop out of the auction when the price passed the district's final bid of $5.8 million.

The Compass Housing Authority, a homeless advocacy group, also proposed renovating the building into a downtown homeless shelter and services center in 2014, but were rejected by the United States Department of Health and Human Services over a lack of funding.

In December 2015, Selig announced updated plans to include 12 additional stories of housing, bringing the total height of the skyscraper to 664 feet (202 m) and 48 stories, which would make it the fifth-tallest building in the city. The skyscraper is scheduled to begin construction in 2018 and open in 2020. After the April 2015 purchase, Selig paid for the cleaning of the building's exterior and plaza and some interior demolition of the first and fourth floors.

After the acquisition of Fernando Botero's "Adam and Eve", a pair of Rubenesque statues, by Martin Selig in early 2016, it was announced that the 12.5-foot-tall (3.8 m) "Adam" would be displayed on a pedestal in front of the Federal Reserve Bank Building.

=== Seven-story addition ===
In June 2016, Selig announced that he would scale back plans after facing opposition from historic preservation groups over the alterations to the historic structure. The new proposed eight-story addition would have 125,000 square feet (11,600 m^{2}) of office space and include a two-story penthouse; parts of the new structure would be illuminated at night. The addition is being designed by a team with William Bain Jr. and John Bain, the son and grandson, respectively, of original architect William Bain. A third design released in late November lowered the height to seven stories and add an opaque west facade after complaints from a neighboring condominium tower. Construction on the addition began in late 2018 and was completed in 2020 with no major office tenant announced.

The Consulate-General of India in Seattle opened in the building in August 2025. They occupy the first and eleventh floors.

=== Handover to Acore Capital ===
In April 2025, the Federal Reserve Building had 82% of its 215,567 square feet (20,026.8 m^{2}) of office space available for lease. Martin Selig Real Estate, which had hundreds of millions of dollars in loans that it was having difficulty repaying, finalized a deal to hand over the Federal Reserve Building and one other building to its lender, Acore Capital. Urban Renaissance Group will take over management of these properties.
