= Adam (Botero) =

Sculpture by Fernando Botero

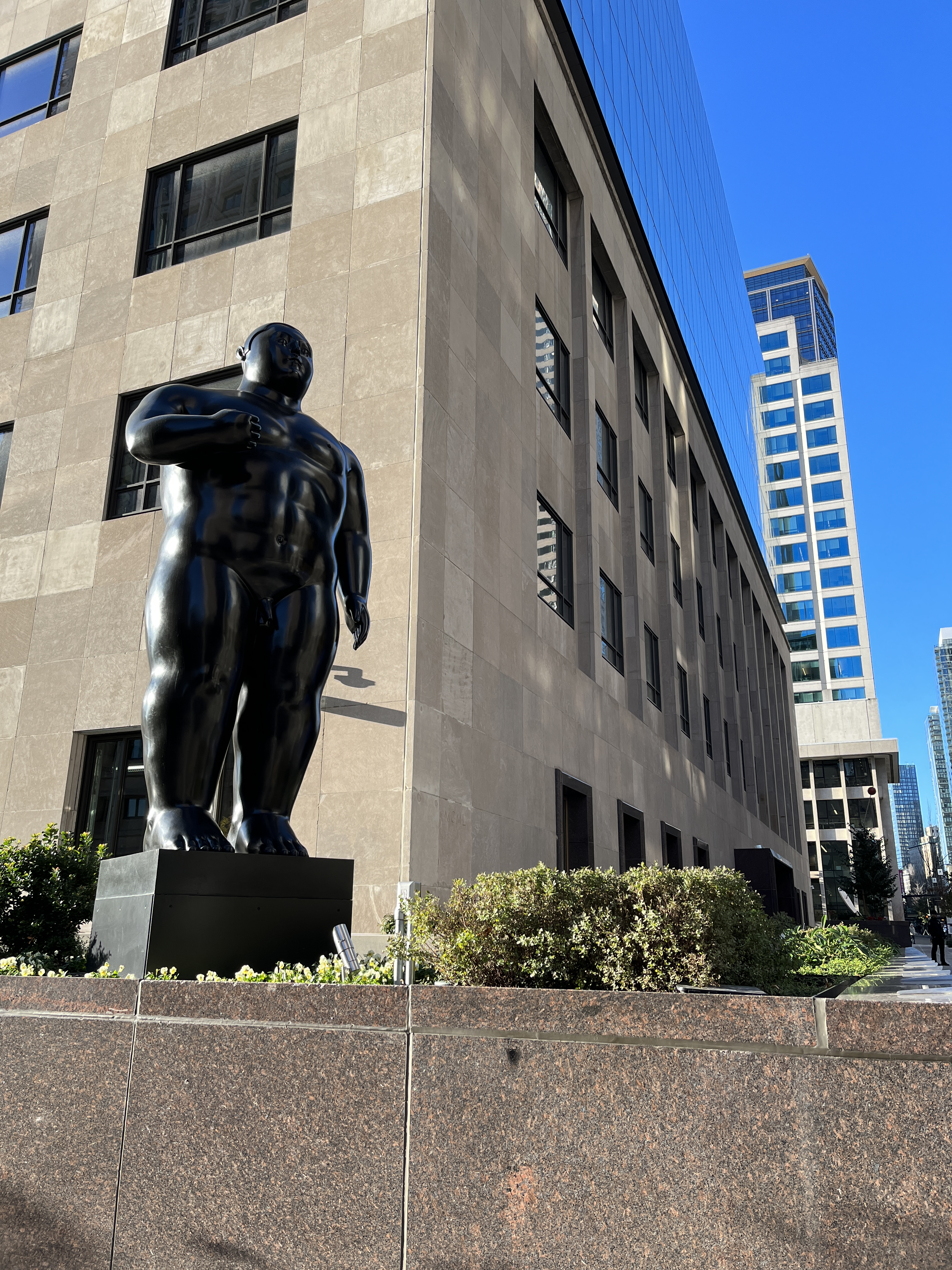
- The statue in 2022
- Artist: Fernando Botero
- Location: Seattle, Washington, U.S.; 47°36′18.6″N 122°20′7.5″W

Adam is a bronze sculpture by Colombian artist Fernando Botero, installed outside Seattle's Federal Reserve Bank Building at the intersection of 2nd and Madison, in the U.S. state of Washington. The statue is approximately 12 feet tall and covered in a brown patina.

Part of Martin Selig's art collection, the work was created in 1996 and acquired in 2016. Botero has created three pairs of statues depicting Adam and Eve (sometimes called Adam and Eve); the sculpture of Eve owned by Martin Selig is in an unknown location, and the other pairs are installed at the Time Warner Center in New York City and at Hotel Michael in Singapore.

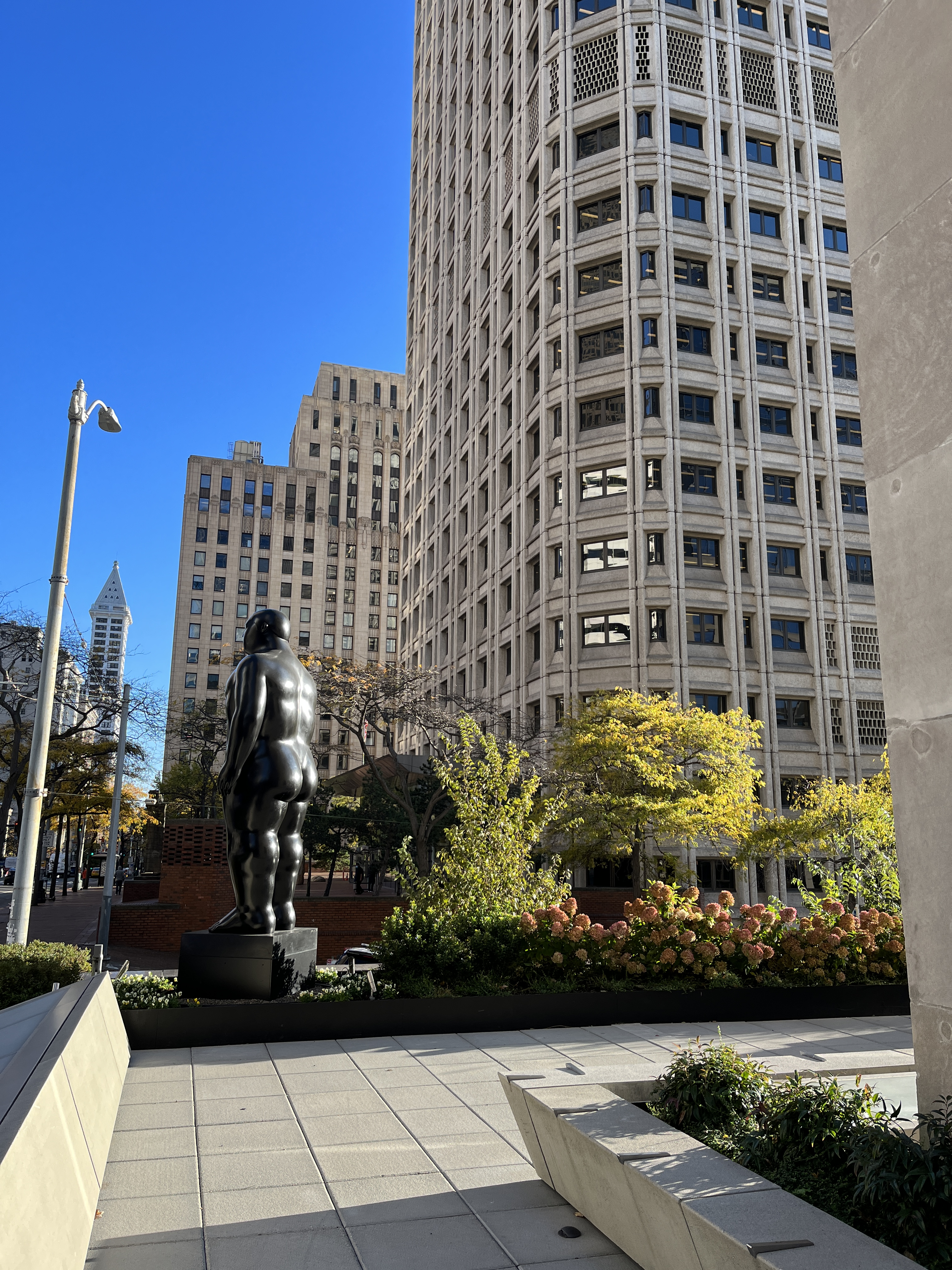
Rear view, 2022

== See also ==
- 1996 in art
