= Michael Strine =

Michael Strine has spent over two decades in COO and CFO roles across the government, education, health and financial services sector, applying his knowledge and experience toward making complex organizations better at what they do for who they serve.

== Career ==
Most recently, he served for over five years at the Federal Reserve Bank of New York as COO and First Vice President from 2015-2021. This position made him an alternate voting member of the Federal Open Market Committee. He joined the New York Federal Reserve as Executive Vice President, CFO, and head of the Corporate Group in 2013.

Strine began his career as a professor, doing teaching and research on the intersection of law, policy, politics and organization at the University of Denver and the University of Colorado-Boulder. He then served two governors of Delaware as chief of policy and operations (a position now known as Deputy Secretary) in the Department of Finance for the State of Delaware. After that, he became Chief Financial Officer for New Castle County, a county with over half a million residents, from 2005 to 2008. Strine returned to his alma mater, Johns Hopkins, in 2008, rising to become Vice President for Finance, Chief Financial Officer and Treasurer of the University, while also serving in numerous directors roles for the joint LLCs of the university and health system. Strine left Hopkins to accept to join University of Virginia as Executive Vice President and Chief Operating Officer In that role, his portfolio included finance, operations, compliance and audit, real estate, public safety and emergency preparedness for both the University and the UVA Health System. In this role, he also served on the boards of the University of Virginia Investment Management Company (UVIMCO), the Medical Center Operating Board, the Board of the UVA Foundation, among other directors' roles.

== Education ==
Strine earned his M.A. and Ph.D. in political science with an emphasis on public law and organizations] from Johns Hopkins University after completing his undergraduate degree magna cum laude at the University of Delaware.
