= Federal Reserve Bank of San Francisco Los Angeles Branch =

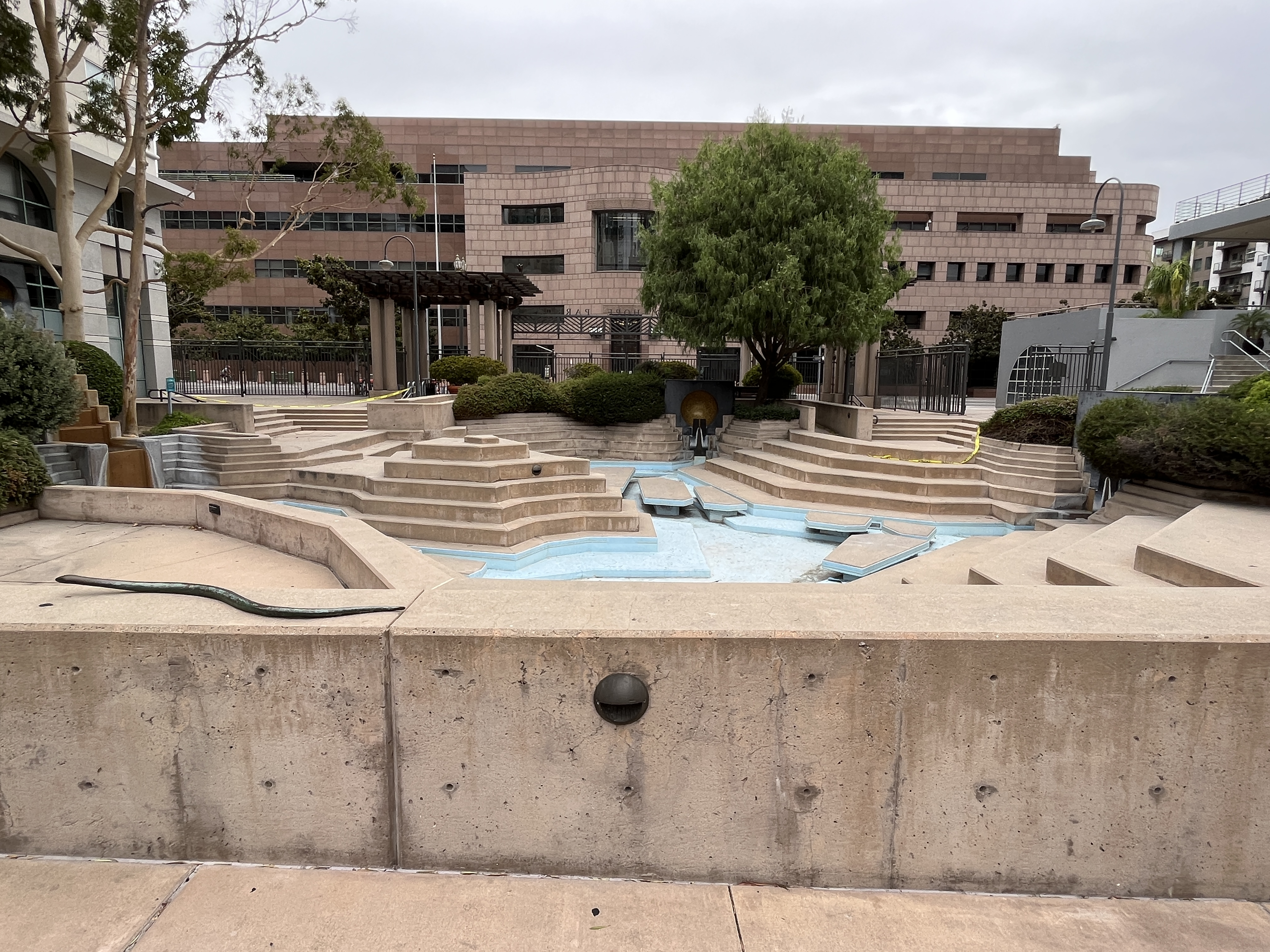
The current Federal Reserve building viewed from Grand Hope Park

The Federal Reserve Bank of San Francisco Los Angeles Branch is one of four branches of the Federal Reserve Bank of San Francisco. The branch is located in Los Angeles, and opened in January 1920.

== Buildings ==
The Los Angeles Branch has been housed in two buildings. The first is a historic building located on West Olympic Boulevard and South Olive Street in southern Downtown Los Angeles. The current building is immediately adjacent to the original one.

=== Original building ===
- Federal Reserve Bank of San Francisco, Los Angeles Branch
- U.S. National Register of Historic Places
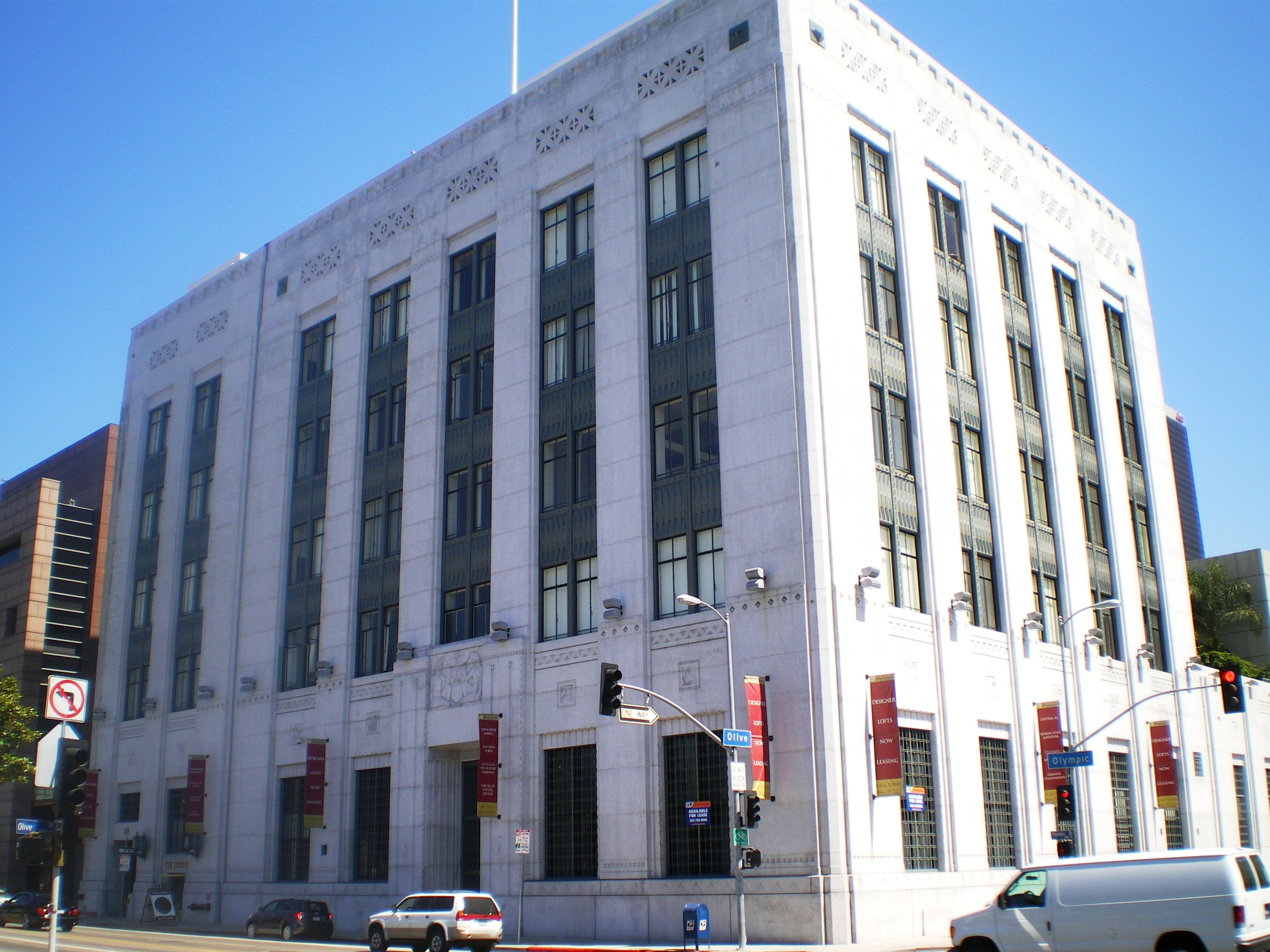
- Former Federal Reserve Bank of San Francisco, Los Angeles Branch building

- Location within the Los Angeles metropolitan area Location within California Location within the United States
- Location: 409 W. Olympic Blvd., Los Angeles, California
- Coordinates: 34°2′34″N 118°15′35″W
- Area: 0.6 acres (0.24 ha)
- Built: 1929
- Architects: Parkinson & Parkinson; P.J. Walker Construction Co.
- Architectural style: Classical Moderne, Streamline Moderne
- NRHP reference No.: 84000843
- Added to NRHP: September 20, 1984

The original 1929 building was designed by John and Donald Parkinson in a Classical Moderne style with elements of Zigzag Moderne. It was listed on the National Register of Historic Places in 1984.

The original building has since been converted to residential lofts.

=== Current building ===
The adjacent 304,000 square feet (28,200 m^{2}) new branch structure with architectural design by Dan Dworsky, interiors by Gensler, construction by Swinerton & Walberg, and project Management by JLH Consulting, was completed in 1987 and dedicated in 1988. The project cost was approximately $50 million. It now houses all operations of the Los Angeles Branch.

== Current board of directors ==
The following people are on the board of directors as of June 2025:

Name	Title	Appointed by	Term expires
Selena S. Cuffe	Co-Founder, Heritage Link Brands and Chief Growth Officer, Blackstone Consulting, Los Angeles	Fed Board of Governors	2027
Carlos Gonzalez	Division President, Clark Construction, Irvine, California	San Francisco Board of Governors	2026
Maria F. Hollandsworth	President and COO, El Pollo Loco, Costa Mesa, California	Fed Board of Governors	2027
Michael D. Jones	President and CEO, Delta Dental of Arizona, Scottsdale, Arizona	Fed Board of Governors	2026
Chang Liu	President and CEO, Cathay Bank and Cathay General Bancorp, Los Angeles	Fed Board of Governors	2025
Rosemary Vassiliadis	Director of Aviation, Harry Reid International Airport, Las Vegas	San Francisco Board of Governors	2025
Vacancy		San Francisco Board of Governors	2027

== See also ==
- Federal Reserve Act
- Federal Reserve System
- Federal Reserve Bank
- Federal Reserve Districts
- Federal Reserve Branches
- Federal Reserve Bank of San Francisco
- Federal Reserve Bank of San Francisco Portland Branch
- Federal Reserve Bank of San Francisco Salt Lake City Branch
- Federal Reserve Bank of San Francisco Seattle Branch
- Federal Reserve Bank of San Francisco Building (San Francisco, California)
- Structure of the Federal Reserve System
