= Karin Kimbrough =

American economist

Karin Janel Kimbrough
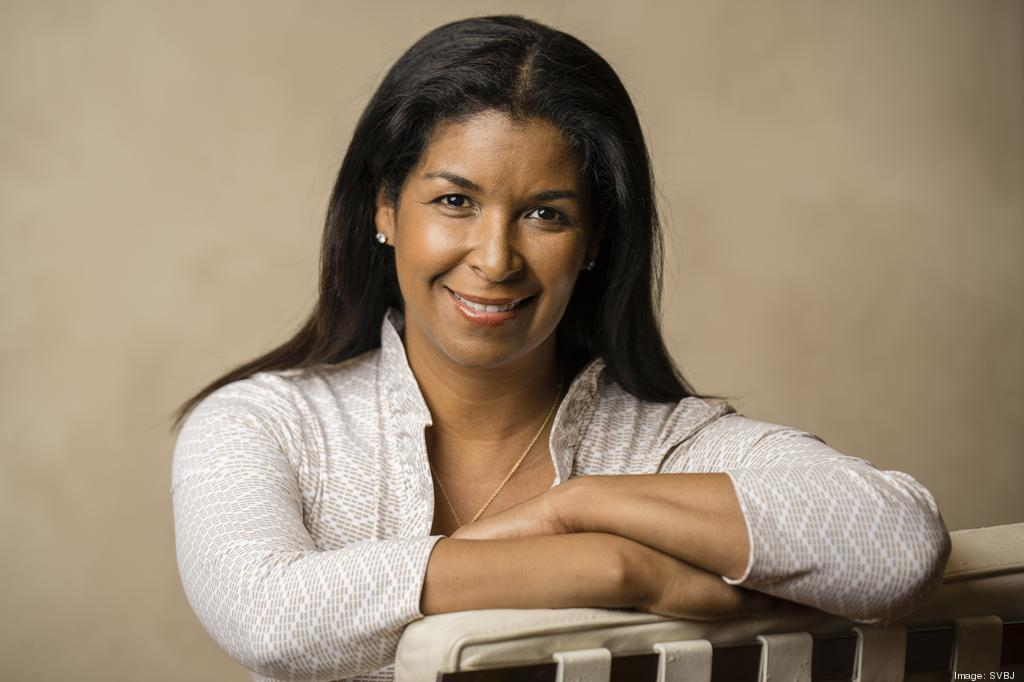
- Karin Kimbrough in 2020
- Education: University of Oxford; Harvard Kennedy School; Stanford University
- Scientific career
- Workplaces: LinkedIn; Federal Reserve Bank of New York; Bank of America; Google
- Thesis: Monetary union, real exchange rates and trade in the West African Economic and Monetary Union (1999)

Karin Janel Kimbrough is an American economist and Chief Economist at LinkedIn. She serves on the board of directors at Fannie Mae, and has previously worked at Google and Bank of America. She was named one of the world's most Powerful Women in Business in 2017.

== Early life and education ==
Kimbrough was an undergraduate student at Stanford University. She moved to the Harvard Kennedy School for her graduate studies, where she specialised in public policy. Kimbrough was a doctoral researcher at the University of Oxford, where she studied the West African Economic and Monetary Union.

== Research and career ==
During the financial crisis Kimbrough was Vice President of Markets at the Federal Reserve Bank. At the Federal Reserve Bank she worked on Vice President and Director for Financial Stability and Analytical Development.

In 2014 she was appointed lead on Macroeconomic Policy at Bank of America, where she spent three years before joining Google as a treasurer.

In January 2020 Kimbrough was appointed the Chief Economist at LinkedIn. Her vision at LinkedIn is to create economic opportunities for the global workforce. She uses LinkedIn Economic Graph, a digital representation of the global economy, for research. She studies workplace trends and career opportunities. She has spoken about the need for Americans to gain more skills in artificial intelligence (AI). She believes that AI will transform the majority of jobs and enhance job mobility. Alongside AI, Kimbrough has argued for skills first hiring, i.e., selecting for competencies over degrees or institutions. She has recommended that congress reauthorise the Workforce Innovation and Opportunity Act, increase work experience opportunities and encourage state-wide skills-first hiring.

In 2019 she joined the board of directors at Fannie Mae, and in 2021 the Board at AllianceData.

=== Awards and honours ===
2017 Black Enterprise Most Powerful Women in Business
