= Ayşegül Şahin =

Turkish-American economist

Ayşegül Şahin is a Turkish American economist whose research focuses on labor markets, unemployment dynamics, and macroeconomic fluctuations. She is a professor of Economics and Public Affairs at Princeton University.

She is the lead editor of the journal AEJ: Macroeconomics. Her works have generated over 10,000 citations. She is the 113th most cited female economist according to RePEC. She is a research associate at the NBER.

== Career ==
Şahin received her PhD in economics from the University of Rochester in 2002, after completing earlier degrees in electrical and electronics engineering at Bilkent University in Turkey.

She began her academic career as an assistant professor at Purdue University. In 2004, she joined the Federal Reserve Bank of New York, where she held several senior roles, including Vice President in the Research Department. At the New York Fed, she led labor market analysis and developed widely used measures of labor market conditions.

In 2018, she joined the University of Texas at Austin, where she held the Richard J. Gonzalez Regents Chair in Economics. She moved to Princeton University in 2024 as Professor of Economics and Public Affairs.

Şahin serves as an editor of the American Economic Journal: Macroeconomics. She is a research associate at the National Bureau of Economic Research and a research fellow at IZA. She has also advised several central banks and public institutions, including the U.S. Congressional Budget Office.

== Main publications ==
Şahin's research studies how workers move between jobs, unemployment, and inactivity over the business cycle. A central theme of her work is that labor market flows matter more than headline unemployment rates. Several of her papers develop new ways to measure labor market slack using job finding, job separation, and participation flows. This work has influenced how economists interpret tightness, maximum employment, and recovery after recessions.

She has written extensively on job search behavior, including how employed and unemployed workers look for jobs and how this affects wages and mobility. Her research also examines mismatches between workers and firms and their role in unemployment and productivity.

Her articles appear in leading journals such as the American Economic Review, Econometrica, Journal of Monetary Economics, Review of Financial Studies, and Journal of Economic Perspectives. In 2014, Ayşegül Şahin co-authored a paper with Nobel laureate Peter Diamond arguing that the Beveridge Curve provides little useful information about the future path of unemployment, a conclusion highlighted in The Wall Street Journal. Şahin has shown that long-term unemployment reflects different underlying mechanisms across countries, with generous unemployment benefits contributing to persistence in Sweden, while in the United Kingdom, Spain and Portugal long-term unemployment has been driven mainly by structural shifts away from construction.
