= Sushmita Shukla =

Sushmita Shukla (born in 1967 or 1968) is a woman of Indian-origin who has worked for many years in the insurance industry. She has been the First Vice President and COO of the Federal Reserve Bank of New York since March, 2023. She also serves as an alternate voting member of the Federal Open Market Committee. She has an MBA from New York University and a bachelor's degree in electrical engineering from the University of Mumbai.

Most recently, Ms. Shukla was Senior Vice President and COO for International Accident & Health at Chubb, the world's largest publicly traded property and casualty insurance company. Previously, Ms. Shukla led an enterprise-wide transformation program at Healthfirst, where she started as Vice President of Enterprise Business Solutions in 2016 and then served as interim Senior Vice President of Enterprise Transformation in 2017. Prior to that, Ms. Shukla spent 10 years at The Hartford. Ms. Shukla has also held positions at Liberty Mutual, Merrill Lynch, and GiantBear Inc., a wireless technology and application service provider in New York.
