= Federal Open Market Committee =

US body that sets national monetary policy

Federal Open Market Committee (FOMC)
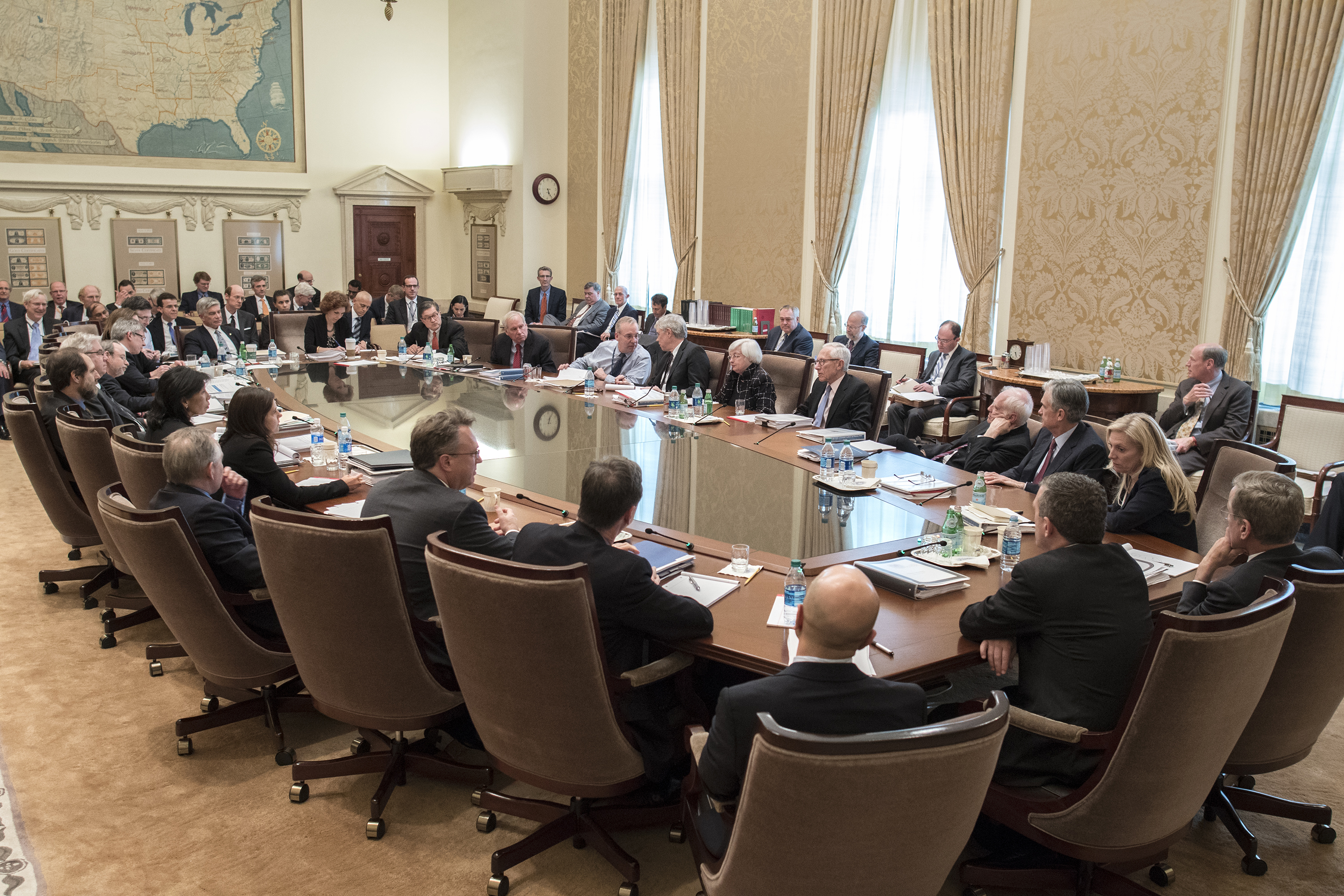
- 2016 meeting of the FOMC at the Eccles Building, Washington, D.C.

Agency overview
- Formed: June 16, 1933
- Jurisdiction: United States
- Headquarters: Eccles Building, Washington, D.C.
- Employees: 12 voting members
- Agency executives: Kevin Warsh, Chairman; John C. Williams, Vice Chairman
- Parent agency: Federal Reserve System
- Website: www.federalreserve.gov/monetarypolicy/fomc.htm

The Federal Open Market Committee (FOMC) is a committee within the Federal Reserve System (colloquially "the Fed") that is charged under United States law with overseeing the nation's open market operations (e.g., the Fed's buying and selling of United States Treasury securities). This Federal Reserve committee makes key decisions about interest rates and the growth of the United States money supply. Under the terms of the original Federal Reserve Act, each of the Federal Reserve banks was authorized to buy and sell in the open market bonds and short term obligations of the United States government, bank acceptances, cable transfers, and bills of exchange. Hence, the reserve banks were at times bidding against each other in the open market. In 1922, an informal committee was established to execute purchases and sales. The Banking Act of 1933 formed an official FOMC.

The FOMC is the principal organ of United States national monetary policy. The committee sets monetary policy by specifying the short-term objective for the Fed's open market operations, which is usually a target level for the federal funds rate (the rate that commercial banks charge between themselves for overnight loans).

The FOMC also directs operations undertaken by the Federal Reserve System in foreign exchange markets, although any intervention in foreign exchange markets is coordinated with the U.S. Treasury, which has responsibility for formulating U.S. policies regarding the exchange value of the dollar.

== Membership ==
The committee consists of the seven members of the Federal Reserve Board, the president of the New York Fed, and four of the other eleven regional Federal Reserve Bank presidents, serving one-year terms. The chair of the Federal Reserve has been invariably appointed by the committee as its chair since 1935, solidifying the perception of the two roles as one.

The Federal Open Market Committee was formed by the Banking Act of 1933 (codified at 12 U.S.C. § 263) and did not include voting rights for the Federal Reserve Board of Governors. The Banking Act of 1935 revised these protocols to include the Board of Governors and to closely resemble the present-day FOMC and was amended in 1942 to give the current structure of twelve voting members.

Four of the Federal Reserve Bank presidents serve one-year terms on a rotating basis. The rotating seats are filled from the following four groups of banks, one bank president from each group: Boston, Philadelphia, and Richmond; Cleveland and Chicago; Atlanta, St. Louis, and Dallas; and Minneapolis, Kansas City, and San Francisco. The New York President always has a voting membership.

All of the Reserve Bank presidents, even those who are not currently voting members of the FOMC, attend committee meetings, participate in discussions, and contribute to the committee's assessment of the economy and policy options. The committee meets eight times a year, approximately once every six weeks.

== Meetings ==
By law, the FOMC must meet at least four times each year in Washington, D.C. Since 1981, eight regularly scheduled meetings have been held each year at intervals of five to eight weeks. If circumstances require consultation or consideration of an action between these regular meetings, members may be called on to participate in a special meeting or a telephone conference, or to vote on a proposed action by proxy. At each regularly scheduled meeting, the committee votes on the policy to be carried out during the interval between meetings. At the October 2026 meeting, ten FOMC members voted to keep interest rates unchanged, while two favored raising them by 0.25 percentage points.

Attendance at meetings is restricted because of the confidential nature of the information discussed and is limited to committee members, nonmember Reserve Bank presidents, staff officers, the manager of the System Open Market Account, and a small number of Board and Reserve Bank staff.

== Decision-making process ==
Before each regularly scheduled meeting of the FOMC, System staff prepare written reports on past and prospective economic and financial developments that are sent to committee members and to nonmember Reserve Bank presidents. Reports prepared by the manager of the System Open Market Account on operations in the domestic open market and in foreign currencies since the last regular meeting are also distributed. At the meeting itself, staff officers present oral reports on the current and prospective business situation, on conditions in financial markets, and on international financial developments.

In its discussions, the committee considers factors such as trends in prices and wages, employment and production, consumer income and spending, residential and commercial construction, business investment and inventories, foreign exchange markets, interest rates, money and credit aggregates, and fiscal policy. The manager of the System Open Market Account also reports on account transactions since the previous meeting.

After these reports, the committee members and other Reserve Bank presidents turn to policy. Typically, each participant expresses their own views on the state of the economy and prospects for the future and on the appropriate direction for monetary policy. Then each makes a more explicit recommendation on policy for the coming intermeeting period (and for the longer run, if under consideration).

Beyond the data the committee reviews directly, the FOMC also pays attention to how markets are reading the economy. Financial stress indicators and market-based forecasts feed into deliberations, giving policymakers a window into how investors weigh the same information.

== Market expectations and policy surprises ==
Before each FOMC meeting, traders and investors attempt to predict what the committee will decide, drawing on economic data and market signals. When the Fed's decision catches markets off guard, economists call this gap a "monetary policy surprise". These surprises are measured by how much federal funds futures contracts move in the minutes around an FOMC announcement.

=== Why surprises are predictable ===
Puzzlingly, these surprises turn out to be partly predictable from information available before meetings. Economists have offered three main explanations.

First, the Fed may know more about the economy than markets do. Under this view, the Fed's policy choices gradually reveal its private information to the public. Supporting this idea, stock prices often rise after surprise rate hikes, as if investors take the Fed's willingness to tighten as a positive signal about the economy.

Second, markets may underestimate how strongly the Fed reacts to economic news, especially during downturns. Variables like the slope of the yield curve, stock returns, and commodity prices all help predict policy surprises, possibly because they capture incoming information that the Fed responds to more aggressively than markets expect.

Third, the Fed may not react directly to individual data releases at all. Instead, it may watch how those releases ripple through financial markets before deciding what to do. If markets expect a more immediate response, surprises become predictable. This view is consistent with findings that financial stress indices, such as those published by the Office of Financial Research and the Federal Reserve Bank of St. Louis, help forecast FOMC decisions.

=== Role of financial conditions ===
Fed Chair Jerome Powell touched on this issue during his May 3, 2023 press conference. He noted that the Fed does "look at financial conditions very broadly" because "they're important for the achievement of our goals", but added that the Fed does not target financial conditions directly. Instead, it treats them as "an important piece of information in assessing the likely path of the economy". Similar remarks appear in FOMC meeting minutes and other Fed communications.

One study finds that the Fed tends to wait before acting on new economic data, especially data released within two weeks of a meeting. Rather than responding right away, the committee appears to let the news settle into broader market conditions first. This pattern is consistent with how the Fed describes its own approach: watching how data affects the overall economic outlook rather than reacting mechanically to any single release.

== Consensus ==
Finally, the committee must reach a consensus regarding the appropriate course for policy, which is incorporated in a directive to the Federal Reserve Bank of New York—the bank that executes transactions for the System Open Market Account. The directive is cast in terms designed to provide guidance to the manager in the conduct of day-to-day open market operations. The directive sets forth the committee's objectives for long-run growth of certain key monetary and credit aggregates.

It also sets forth operating guidelines for the degree of ease or restraint to be sought in reserve conditions and expectations with regard to short-term rates of growth in the monetary aggregates. Policy is implemented with emphasis on supplying reserves in a manner consistent with these objectives and with the nation's broader economic objectives.

== Congressional oversight ==
Under the Federal Reserve Act, the chairman of the Board of Governors of the Federal Reserve System must appear before congressional hearings at least twice per year regarding "the efforts, activities, objectives and plans of the Board and the Federal Open Market Committee with respect to the conduct of monetary policy". The statute requires that the chairman appear before the House Committee on Financial Services in February and July of odd-numbered years, and before the Senate Committee on Banking, Housing, and Urban Affairs in February and July of even-numbered years.

There is a very strong consensus against basing selection of committee members primarily on the candidate's political views.

== Interest rate targeting ==
The committee's practice of interest rate targeting has been criticized by some commentators who argue that it may risk an inflationary bias.

Possible alternative rules that enjoy some support among economists include the traditional monetarist formula of targeting stable growth in an appropriately chosen monetary aggregate, and inflation targeting, now practiced by many central banks. Under inflationary pressure in 1979, the Fed temporarily abandoned interest rate targeting in favor of targeting non-borrowed reserves. It concluded, however, that this approach led to increased volatility in interest rates and monetary growth, and reversed itself in 1982.

A related criticism is that the Fed's statements do not fully explain how it weighs incoming information. The committee's mandate focuses on employment and price stability, yet its decisions also appear shaped by financial market conditions. When traders expect the Fed to react more directly to jobs or inflation data, forecast errors arise that show up as predictable policy surprises.

Former Fed chairman Ben Bernanke spoke sympathetically as a governor in 2003 of the inflation targeting approach. He explained that even a central bank like the Fed, which does not orient its monetary policies around an explicit, published inflation target, nonetheless takes account of its goal of low and stable inflation in formulating its interest rate targets. Bernanke summed up his overall assessment of inflation targeting as follows:

Inflation targeting, at least in its best-practice form, consists of two parts: a policy framework of constrained discretion and a communication strategy that attempts to focus expectations and explain the policy framework to the public. Together, these two elements promote both price stability and well-anchored inflation expectations; the latter in turn facilitates more effective stabilization of output and employment. Thus, a well-conceived and well-executed strategy of inflation targeting can deliver good results with respect to output and employment as well as inflation. Although communication plays several important roles in inflation targeting, perhaps the most important is focusing and anchoring expectations. Clearly there are limits to what talk can achieve; ultimately, talk must be backed up by action, in the form of successful policies. Likewise, for a successful and credible central bank like the Federal Reserve, the immediate benefits of adopting a more explicit communication strategy may be modest. Nevertheless, making the investment now in greater transparency about the central bank's objectives, plans, and assessments of the economy could pay increasing dividends in the future.

In keeping with his 2003 speech as governor, Bernanke as chairman attempted to promote greater transparency in Fed communications. The Fed now publicly indicates the range within which it would like to see future inflation.

== Current members ==
Members of the FOMC as of May 22, 2026:

=== Members ===
- Kevin Warsh, Board of Governors, Chairman
- John C. Williams, New York, Vice Chairman
- Michael S. Barr, Board of Governors
- Michelle Bowman, Board of Governors (NB: Ms. Bowman is Vice Chair of the Federal Reserve for Supervision)
- Lisa D. Cook, Board of Governors
- Beth M. Hammack, Cleveland
- Philip N. Jefferson, Board of Governors (NB: Mr. Jefferson is the Vice Chairman of the Federal Reserve System, though not of the FOMC)
- Neel Kashkari, Minneapolis
- Lorie K. Logan, Dallas
- Anna Paulson, Philadelphia
- Jerome Powell, Board of Governors
- Christopher Waller, Board of Governors

=== Alternate members ===
- Thomas Barkin, Richmond
- Mary C. Daly, San Francisco
- Austan Goolsbee, Chicago
- Sushmita Shukla, First Vice President, New York
- Cheryl Venable, Atlanta (interim)

Federal Reserve Bank Rotation on the FOMC
Committee membership changes at the first regularly scheduled meeting of the year, which for 2026 is scheduled for January 27-28.

2027 Members – New York, Richmond, San Francisco, Chicago, Atlanta

2027 Alternate Members – New York†, Cleveland, Boston, St. Louis, Kansas City

†For the Federal Reserve Bank of New York, the First Vice President is the alternate for the President.

== See also ==
- Banking Act of 1933 and 1935 – created and gave voting rights to the 7 Federal Reserve Board of Governors appointed by the president, there are a total of 12 FOMC members.
- Federal funds rate
- Monetary Policy Committee, the equivalent organ of the United Kingdom's Bank of England, and modeled in part on the FOMC
- Money creation — private banks are the primary creators and retirement of money when issuing and collecting the principal on loans
- Sovereign money system
- Taylor rule
- Forward guidance
