= List of former employees of Goldman Sachs =

This list of former employees of Goldman Sachs catalogs notable alumni of the New York City-based investment bank in different fields.

- Jacob Aarup-Andersen – Danish head of banking for Danske Bank
- Bradley Abelow – Former Chief of Staff and Treasurer of New Jersey under Jon Corzine, and President of MF Global, Inc.
- Guy Adami – CNBC's Fast Money
- Olusegun Olutoyin Aganga – Former Nigerian Finance Minister, Nigerian Minister for Trade and Investments
- Sergey Aleynikov – Goldman Sachs computer programmer convicted of stealing Goldman's code
- Erik Åsbrink – Minister for Finance of Sweden (1996–1999)
- Cliff Asness – billionaire hedge fund manager, co-founder of AQR Capital Management
- Ziad Bahaa-Eldin – Deputy Prime Minister of Egypt (2013–2014)
- Steve Bannon – Former executive chairman of Breitbart News LLC, and chief executive officer of the Donald Trump presidential campaign, 2016
- Chetan Bhagat – Indian author
- Fischer Black – Co–author of the Black–Scholes equation and the Black-Derman-Toy model
- Lloyd Blankfein – investment banker, Senior Chairman of Goldman Sachs and former chairman and CEO of Goldman Sachs.
- Joshua Bolten – Former White House Chief of Staff
- António Borges – Portuguese economist and banker
- Diethart Breipohl – Head of Group Finance at Allianz
- Willem Buiter – Chief Economist of Citigroup (2010–)
- Erin Burnett – CNN host
- Mark Carney – Prime Minister of Canada (2025-), Governor of the Bank of England (2013–2020) and former Governor of the Bank of Canada (2008–2013)
- R. Martin Chavez – American investment banker and entrepreneur, former Goldman Sachs CFO
- Efthymios Christodoulou – Governor of the Bank of Greece (1991–1993)
- Petros Christodoulou – General Manager of the Public Debt Management Agency of Greece (2010–2012) and Deputy Chief Executive Officer of the National Bank of Greece (2012–)
- Gary Cohn – Director of the National Economic Council and chief economic advisor to President Donald Trump from 2017 to 2018, vice-chairman of IBM
- Michael Cohrs – Member of Court and the Financial Policy Committee at the Bank of England
- Leon Cooperman – billionaire investor, hedge fund manager
- Jon Corzine – Former CEO of MF Global, Inc., former Democratic Governor (2006–2010) and US Senator (2001–2006), New Jersey
- Jim Cramer – Founder of TheStreet.com, best-selling author, and host of Mad Money on CNBC
- Charles de Croisset – General Treasurer of Société des amis du Louvre
- Guillermo de la Dehesa – Secretary of State of Economy and Finance of Spain (1986–1988)
- Emanuel Derman – South African co-developer of the Black-Derman-Toy model
- Vladimír Dlouhý – Minister of Industry and Trade of the Czech Republic (1992–1997)
- Mario Draghi – Italian, President of the European Central Bank (2011–2019)
- William C. Dudley – President of the Federal Reserve Bank of New York
- Rahm Emanuel – Mayor of Chicago (2011–2019)
- Hafize Gaye Erkan - Governor of CBRT (2023-present), first female governor of the Central Bank
- Óscar Fanjul – Spanish founding chairman and CEO of Repsol
- Michael D. Fascitelli – president and trustee of Vornado Realty Trust
- Fang Fenglei – deputy chief executive of China International Capital Corporation
- Henry H. Fowler – Former United States Secretary of the Treasury (1965–1969)
- Alberto Maria Genovese - Italian entrepreneur, known as the "king of startups"
- Gary Gensler – Chairman of the US Commodity Futures Trading Commission (2009–2014) and chairman of the US Securities and Exchange Commission (2021-2025)
- Mark Gilbert – Major League Baseball player, and US Ambassador to New Zealand and Samoa
- Judd Gregg – Governor of New Hampshire (1989–1993) and United States Senator from New Hampshire (1993–2011)
- Chris Grigg – CEO of British Land (2009– )
- Charlie Haas – Wrestler, working for World Wrestling Entertainment
- Victor Halbertstadt – Professor of Public Sector Finance at the University of Leiden
- Guy Hands – English CEO of Terra Firma Capital Partners
- Jim Himes – member of the House of Representatives (2009–present), representing Connecticut
- Kazuo Inamori – Chairman of Japan Airlines (2010–)
- Reuben Jeffery III – Under Secretary of State for Economic, Business, and Agricultural Affairs (2007–)
- Philip Johnston - Co-Founder and CEO of Starcloud
- Neel Kashkari – Former Interim Assistant Secretary of the Treasury for Financial Stability (2008–2009)
- Paul B. Kazarian — Founder of Japonica Partners and President of Charles & Agnes Kazarian Foundation
- Jörg Kukies — German economist and Minister of Finance (2024–2025)
- Edward Lampert – Hedge fund manager of ESL Investments. Brought Kmart out of Bankruptcy, merged with Sears and serves as CEO
- Jason Lee – Founder of Dailypay and acquitted of rape
- Gianni Letta – Secretary to the Council of Ministers of Italy under the governments of Silvio Berlusconi
- Matt Levine – columnist for Bloomberg News
- Arthur Levitt – Chairman of the Securities and Exchange Commission (1993–2001)
- Klaus Luft – German businessman and Honorary Consul of Estonia to Bavaria
- Ian Macfarlane – Governor of the Reserve Bank of Australia (1996–2006)
- Stephen Mandel - billionaire investor, hedge fund manager, and philanthropist. He founded Lone Pine Capital
- Tito Mboweni – Governor of the Reserve Bank of South Africa (1999–2009)
- Evan McMullin – Independent candidate for President in the 2016 US presidential election
- Scott Mead – Photographer and an investment banker
- Karel Van Miert – European Commissioner for Transport and Consumer Protection (1989–1993) and European Commissioner for Competition (1993–1999)
- Carlos Moedas – Portuguese, European Commissioner for Research, Science and Innovation
- R. Scott Morris – Former CEO of Boston Options Exchange
- Dambisa Moyo – Zambian economist and author of Dead Aid: Why Aid is Not Working and How There is a Better Way For Africa
- Steven Mnuchin – Former United States Secretary of the Treasury (2017–2020), National Finance Chairman for the Donald Trump 2016 presidential campaign, and Former Chief Information Officer For Goldman Sachs
- Phil Murphy (D) – Current Governor State of New Jersey
- Ashwin Navin – Indian-American President and co-founder of BitTorrent, Inc.
- Daniel Och – billionaire investor, hedge fund manager, and philanthropist. He is the founder, chairman and former CEO of Och-Ziff Capital Management Group
- Dr. Ann Olivarius, American-British chair, McAllister Olivarius, employment and discrimination lawyer
- Prince Friso of Orange-Nassau – Younger brother of Willem-Alexander of the Netherlands
- Andrea Orcel – President of UBS Investment Bank (2014–2018)
- Lucas Papademos Greek economist
- Mark Patterson – Chief of Staff to the United States Secretary of the Treasury of the United States (2009–)
- Henry “Hank” Paulson – Former United States Secretary of the Treasury (2006–2009)
- Romano Prodi – Prime Minister of Italy (1996–1998, 2006–2008) and President of the European Commission (1999–2004)
- Justin B. Ries – scientist and inventor known for discoveries in the field of global climate change
- Robert Rubin – Former Secretary of the Treasury of the United States, ex–Chairman of Citigroup
- Anthony Scaramucci – Former White House Communications Director (2017)
- Harvey Schwartz – American investment banker, former Goldman Sachs CFO and co-COO.
- Robert F. Smith (investor) - Billionaire founder and CEO of private equity firm Vista Equity Partners. Wealthiest African-American.
- Robert Steel – Former Chairman and President, Wachovia
- Milojko Spajić – Prime Minister of Montenegro (2023–)
- Gene Sperling – Director of the National Economic Council (2011–2014)
- Rishi Sunak – Prime Minister of the United Kingdom (2022–2024)
- Peter Sutherland – UN representative for refugees; former EU commissioner; former attorney general of Ireland; Chairman Emeritus of GS International
- David Tepper – billionaire hedge fund manager and owner of NFL team Carolina Panthers
- John Thain – Former Chairman and CEO, Merrill Lynch, and former chairman of the NYSE
- Massimo Tononi – Treasury Undersecretary of the Ministry Of Economy and Finance of Italy (2006–2008)
- Malcolm Turnbull – Former Prime Minister of Australia (2015-2018)
- Phil Venables (computer scientist) - Former Chief Information Security Officer (CISO) of Goldman Sachs, current CISO of Google Cloud. Member of the President's Council of Advisors on Science and Technology
- Stephen Violago – Senior Vice President at Goldman Sachs (2011-2023), Director at Cantor Fitzgerald (2023-Present)
- George Herbert Walker IV – chairman and CEO at Neuberger Berman and member of the Bush family
- Thomas B. Walker, Jr. – established Goldman Sachs' presence in the Southwestern United States
- Elisha Wiesel – chief information officer of Goldman Sachs; hedge fund manager of the Niche Plus; son of Elie Wiesel
- Ryan Williams - founder of Cadre, technology entrepreneur
- Robert Zoellick – United States Trade Representative (2001–2005), Deputy Secretary of State (2005–2006), World Bank President (2007–2012)
- Alice Weidel – German politician, leader of the far-right Alternative for Germany (AfD) party (2002-Present)
