= Andrew Ross Sorkin =

American journalist and author (born 1977)

- Sorkin at the 2026 Status Summit
- Born: February 19, 1977 (age 49); New York City, U.S.
- Education: Cornell University (BS)
- Occupations: Journalist; television writer; producer
- Years active: 1996–present
- Known for: Too Big to Fail
- Spouse: Pilar Jenny Queen (m. 2007)
- Children: 3

Andrew Ross Sorkin (born February 19, 1977) is an American journalist and author. He is a financial columnist for The New York Times and a co-anchor of CNBC's Squawk Box. He is also the founder and editor of DealBook, a financial news service published by The New York Times. He wrote the bestselling book Too Big to Fail and co-produced a movie adaptation of the book for HBO Films. He is also a co-creator of the Showtime series Billions.

In October 2025, Sorkin published 1929: Inside the Greatest Crash in Wall Street History—and How It Shattered a Nation, a history of the Crash based on hundreds of documents, many previously unpublished.

== Early life and education ==
Sorkin was born in New York City, the son of Joan Ross Sorkin, a playwright, and Laurence T. Sorkin, a partner at the law firm Cahill Gordon & Reindel. Sorkin graduated from Scarsdale High School in 1995 and earned a Bachelor of Science in communication from Cornell University in 1999 where he was a member of Sigma Pi fraternity, Mu Chapter. He is not related to writer Aaron Sorkin, who also grew up in Scarsdale. He is of Jewish descent.

== Career ==
=== Journalist ===
Sorkin first joined The New York Times in 1995, at 18, as a student intern during his senior year in high school. He also worked for the paper while he was in college, with 71 articles published before he graduated. He began by writing media and technology articles while assisting the advertising columnist, Stuart Elliott. Sorkin spent the summer of 1996 working for Businessweek, before returning to The New York Times. While living in London in 1998, he covered European business and technology for The New York Times, and then returned to Cornell to complete his studies. At Cornell, he was vice president of the Sigma Pi fraternity.

==== Mergers and acquisitions reporter ====
Sorkin joined The New York Times full-time in 1999 as the newspaper's European mergers and acquisitions reporter, and was based in London. In 2000, Sorkin became the paper's chief mergers and acquisitions reporter, based in New York, a position he still holds. In 2001, Sorkin founded "DealBook," an online daily financial report published by the Times. As Editor-at-Large of "DealBook," Sorkin writes a weekly column of the same name. Sorkin is also an assistant editor of business and finance news for the paper.

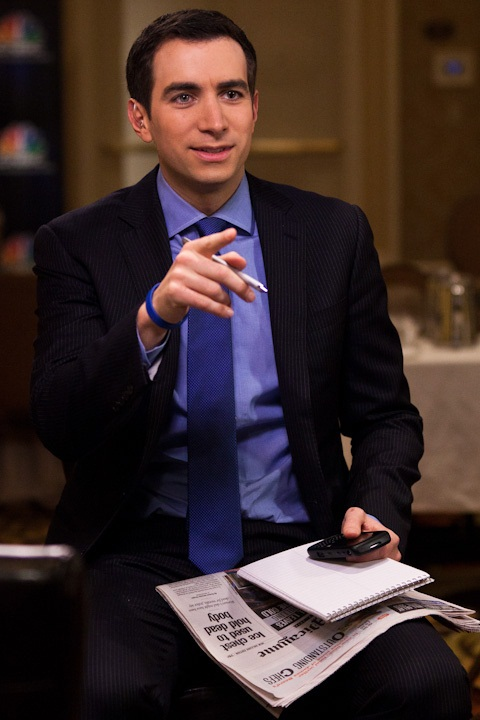
Sorkin in 2012

Sorkin has broken news of major mergers and acquisitions, including Chase's acquisition of J.P. Morgan & Co. and Hewlett-Packard's acquisition of Compaq. He also led The New York Times' coverage of the largest takeover in history, Vodafone's $183 billion hostile bid for Mannesmann. Additionally, he broke the news of IBM's sale of its PC business to Lenovo, Boston Scientific's $25 billion acquisition of Guidant and Symantec's $13 billion deal for Veritas Software, and reported on News Corp.'s acquisition of Dow Jones and The Wall Street Journal. Sorkin has reported on the Wall Street financial crisis, including the collapse of Bear Stearns and Lehman Brothers, and the government bailout of other major investment banks and AIG. He has also written about the troubled American auto industry.

In 2007, Sorkin was one of the first journalists to identify and criticize "carried interest", a tax loophole for private equity firms and hedge funds. He first wrote about the topic in a column in March 2007, calling the tax treatment a "charade", and later wrote about it on the front page of The New York Times. He has written at least a half dozen articles critiquing the tax practice by private equity firms and advocated for the government to end the loophole.

In 2014, Sorkin wrote a series of columns criticizing American corporations for trying to lower their US tax bill by merging with smaller foreign companies in a transaction known as an "inversion". He also criticized the Wall Street banks that advised US companies to pursue such deals, describing the banks as "corporate co-conspirators". Sorkin called on the government to end the practice. On September 22, 2014, the Obama administration changed the tax laws to make it more difficult for US companies to merge to avoid taxes.

On the PRISM surveillance program and Edward Snowden situation, Sorkin said, "I would arrest him and now I'd almost arrest Glenn Greenwald, the journalist who seems to be out there, he wants to help him get to Ecuador." The next day, Sorkin apologized for the comment; Greenwald accepted, tweeting "Thank you: accepted & appreciated".

=== DealBook ===
In October 2001, while a journalist at The New York Times, Sorkin started DealBook, a newsletter about deal-making and Wall Street. DealBook was one of the first financial news aggregation services on the Internet. In March 2006, Sorkin introduced a companion website published on The New York Times, with updated news and original analysis throughout the day. In 2007, DealBook won a Webby Award for Best Business Blog and it won a SABEW award for overall excellence. In 2008, the site won an EPpy Award for Best Business Blog.

== Television ==
In July 2011, Sorkin became a co-anchor on CNBC's Squawk Box in addition to his duties at The New York Times. Sorkin has appeared on NBC's Today show, Charlie Rose and The NewsHour with Jim Lehrer on PBS, MSNBC's Hardball and Morning Joe, ABC's Good Morning America, The Chris Matthews Show, HBO's Real Time with Bill Maher, the BBC World Service, Comedy Central's The Daily Show and The Colbert Report, and was a frequent guest host of CNBC's Squawk Box before joining the ensemble. Sorkin also hosted a weekly seven-part, half-hour PBS talk-show series called It's the Economy, NY, which focused on how the evolving economic crisis was affecting New Yorkers.

Along with Brian Koppelman and David Levien, Sorkin is a co-creator of the Showtime series Billions, an American television drama series starring Paul Giamatti and Damian Lewis. The series is loosely based on crusading federal prosecutor of financial crimes, Preet Bharara, the former U.S. Attorney for the Southern District of New York. The show premiered in January 2016.

Sorkin made a cameo appearance as himself in a 2023 episode of The Simpsons parodying Silicon Valley, where Sorkin interviews Mr. Burns and tech entrepreneur Persephone.

== Too Big to Fail ==
Sorkin's book on the Wall Street banking crisis, Too Big to Fail: The Inside Story of How Wall Street and Washington Fought to Save the Financial System—and Themselves, was published by Viking on October 20, 2009. It won the 2010 Gerald Loeb Award for best business book of the year, was on the shortlist for the 2010 Samuel Johnson Prize, shortlisted for the 2010 Financial Times and Goldman Sachs Business Book of the Year Award, and was on The New York Times Best Seller list (non-fiction hardcover and paperback) for six months.

The book was adapted as a movie by HBO Films and premiered on HBO on May 23, 2011. The film was directed by Curtis Hanson and the screenplay was written by Peter Gould. The cast included William Hurt as Hank Paulson, the Treasury Secretary; Paul Giamatti as Ben Bernanke, the chairman of the Federal Reserve; Billy Crudup as Timothy Geithner, the then-president of the New York Federal Reserve Bank; James Woods as Richard Fuld, the CEO of Lehman Brothers; Edward Asner as Warren Buffett, the CEO of Berkshire Hathaway; Cynthia Nixon as Michele Davis, assistant secretary for public affairs at Treasury; Bill Pullman as Jamie Dimon, CEO of JPMorgan Chase; as well as Topher Grace as Jim Wilkinson, Chief of Staff to the Treasury Secretary. Sorkin was a co-producer of the film and had a cameo appearance as a reporter.

== Awards ==
Sorkin shared the Gerald Loeb Award in 2005 for Deadline Writing and earned another for Business Book in 2010 for his book Too Big to Fail. He also won a Society of American Business Editors and Writers Award for breaking news in 2005 and again in 2006. In 2007, the World Economic Forum named him a Young Global Leader. Also in 2007, SiliconAlleyInsider.com named Sorkin one of New York's "most influential scribes". In 2008, Vanity Fair magazine named Sorkin as one of 40 new members of the "Next Establishment", and he appeared on the UJA Federation's 2013 list of 40 under 40 top "movers and shakers" in the Jewish community. Sorkin is a member of the Council on Foreign Relations.

In 2014, Sorkin received an honorary Doctor of Humane Letters degree from Marymount Manhattan College.

In 2022, Sorkin won an Emmy Award for his New York Times interview with WeWork founder Adam Neumann.

In 2026, Sorkin presented the commencement address at American University and received an honorary of Doctor of Humane Letters degree.

== In popular culture ==
In the penultimate episode of Breaking Bad, called "Granite State", Sorkin is briefly referenced. He is said to have written an op-ed in The New York Times accusing fictional entrepreneurs Gretchen and Elliott Schwartz of making donations to drug rehabilitation centers in the hopes of cleansing their company's image after the Walter White scandal. Sorkin later wrote the entire fictional article.

== Personal life ==
Sorkin married Pilar Jenny Queen on June 9, 2007.

Sorkin has a coloboma in his left eye that sometimes makes it appear as if he has two different colored eyes.

He is actively involved with the New York Public Library, having served as a co-chair of the Business Leadership Council from at least 2016–2020.

== Books ==
- Sorkin, Andrew Ross (2009). Too Big to Fail: The Inside Story of How Wall Street and Washington Fought to Save the Financial System—and Themselves (First hardcover ed.). New York: Viking/Penguin/PRH. ISBN 9780670021253. OCLC 317928209.
- Sorkin, Andrew Ross (2025). 1929: Inside the Greatest Crash in Wall Street History—and How It Shattered a Nation (First hardcover ed.). New York: Viking/Penguin/PRH. ISBN 9780593296967. OCLC 1540975842.

== See also ==
- New Yorkers in journalism
