= Luft =

Luft or Lufft is a surname. Notable people with the surname include:

- Arthur Luft (died 2009), Manx judge and politician
- Cara Luft, Canadian singer-songwriter
- Christa Luft (born 1938), German economist and politician
- Don Luft (1930–2002), American football player
- Friedrich Luft (1911–1990), German writer, screenwriter, newspaper columnist and theater and film critic
- Gal Luft (born 1966), Israeli lieutenant colonel, Israeli-American think-tank director, author, alleged unregistered foreign agent and fugitive
- Hans Lufft (1495–1584), German printer and publisher, first publisher of Luther's Bible
- Klaus Luft (born 1941), German businessman
- Lorna Luft (born 1952), American actress and singer
- Lya Luft (1938–2021), Brazilian writer and poet
- Mark Luft, 21st century American politician
- Molly Luft (1944–2010), German prostitute, talk show host and brothel owner
- Paul Luft (born 1934), German Islamic studies scholar
- Richard Luft (1938–2023), American politician
- Rob Luft (born 1993), English jazz guitarist and composer
- Setta Luft (1870–1910), German-born British social worker
- Sidney Luft (1915–2005), American film producer, third husband of Judy Garland
- Stanley J. Luft, American philatelist
- Wilbur Luft (1908–1991), American football player and coach
