= Too Big to Fail (film) =

2011 American biographical TV film

- Television release poster
- Genre: Biographical drama
- Based on: Too Big to Fail by Andrew Ross Sorkin
- Written by: Peter Gould
- Directed by: Curtis Hanson
- Starring: William Hurt; Edward Asner; Billy Crudup; Paul Giamatti; Topher Grace; Cynthia Nixon; Bill Pullman; Tony Shalhoub; James Woods
- Music by: Marcelo Zarvos
- Country of origin: United States
- Original language: English

Production
- Executive producers: Paula Weinstein; Jeffrey Levine; Curtis Hanson
- Producer: Ezra Swerdlow
- Cinematography: Kramer Morgenthau
- Editors: Barbara Tulliver; Plummy Tucker
- Running time: 98 minutes
- Production companies: Spring Creek Productions; Deuce Three Productions

Original release
- Network: HBO
- Release: May 23, 2011

Too Big to Fail is a 2011 American biographical drama television film directed by Curtis Hanson and written by Peter Gould, based on Andrew Ross Sorkin's 2009 non-fiction book Too Big to Fail. The cast includes William Hurt, Edward Asner, Billy Crudup, Paul Giamatti, Topher Grace, Cynthia Nixon, Bill Pullman, Tony Shalhoub, and James Woods. The film aired on HBO on May 23, 2011.

The film chronicles the 2008 financial crisis, focusing on the collapse of Lehman Brothers investment bank and the subsequent ripple effects on the global economy. As the firm's negotiations with potential buyers fail due to toxic assets and regulatory obstacles, the firm declares bankruptcy, triggering market chaos. Treasury Secretary Henry Paulson (Hurt) and Federal Reserve Chair Ben Bernanke (Giamatti) lead efforts to stabilize the system, including rescuing AIG and lobbying Congress to pass the Troubled Asset Relief Program (TARP).

It received 11 nominations at the 63rd Primetime Emmy Awards; Paul Giamatti's portrayal of Ben Bernanke earned him the Screen Actors Guild Award for Outstanding Performance by a Male Actor in a Miniseries or Television Movie at the 18th Screen Actors Guild Awards.

== Plot ==
In 2008, the subprime mortgage crisis is affecting investment banks holding massive real estate assets. In the midst of an election year, Treasury Secretary Henry Paulson is wary of funding more ‘bailouts’, after he guaranteed the sale of Bear Stearns at a fraction of its value to JPMorgan Chase. He refuses to step in after shares of investment bank, Lehman Brothers, lose significant value. Lehman CEO Richard Fuld makes a string of bad decisions, pushing Lehman's shares down into single-digits by Friday, September 12.

Timothy Geithner, Chairman of the Federal Reserve Bank of New York, wants Paulson to aid a Lehman-merger with Bank of America, but Paulson wants other affected banks to guarantee the deal. He calls an emergency meeting with major bank CEOs at the Federal Reserve. As they hash out terms, Bank of America shockingly announces the acquisition of Merrill instead. Lehman redirects its hopes to UK bank, Barclays, but British regulators "don't want to import [America’s] cancer." With no sale imminent, the bankruptcy of Lehman Brothers is filed on September 15.

Immediately, the stock market crashes and investors start pulling funds. Banks stop lending money, freezing the credit market for businesses to borrow for their operations. Faced with paying off large amounts of CDSs against failing mortgages, insurance giant AIG faces a liquidity crisis. French Finance minister, Christine Lagarde, urges Paulson to not let AIG fail too, as they are too interconnected in international business. The government complies by rescuing AIG with an $85-billion loan.

Meanwhile, Ben Bernanke fears a lack of credit in the system would lead to another Great Depression. Neel Kashkari proposes buying out toxic assets to restore confidence in financial institutions, but the $700-billion program will not work fast enough. Dan Jester, Paulson's former colleague and an advisor, suggests injecting capital into the banks, so that they can lend out to borrowers. Government intervention would trigger concerns of nationalisation, so few restrictions are placed on how banks use federal money. Noting the irony, advisor Michele Davis laments that banks can dictate terms to the government while not taking any blame for the financial crisis.

An epilogue reveals that credit conditions did not ease until 2009, when the market freefall was arrested. Meanwhile, banks misappropriated federal loans to facilitate new highs in Wall Street compensation, which rose to $135 billion by 2010.

== Cast ==
The cast includes the following:

- William Hurt as Henry Paulson (U.S. Treasury Secretary and former Chairman and CEO, Goldman Sachs)
- Edward Asner as Warren Buffett (Primary shareholder, Chairman and CEO, Berkshire Hathaway)
- Billy Crudup as Timothy Geithner (President of the Federal Reserve Bank of New York)
- Paul Giamatti as Ben Bernanke (Chair of the Federal Reserve)
- Topher Grace as Jim Wilkinson (Chief of Staff, U.S. Treasury Department)
- Matthew Modine as John Thain (Chairman and CEO, Merrill)
- Cynthia Nixon as Michele Davis (Assistant Secretary of the Treasury for Public Relations and Director of Policy Planning)
- Michael O'Keefe as Chris Flowers (Chairman and CEO, J.C. Flowers & Co.)
- Bill Pullman as Jamie Dimon (Chairman and CEO, JPMorgan Chase)
- Tony Shalhoub as John Mack (Chairman and CEO, Morgan Stanley)
- James Woods as Dick Fuld (Chairman and CEO, Lehman Brothers)
- Ayad Akhtar as Neel Kashkari (Assistant Secretary of the Treasury for International Economics and Development)
- Kathy Baker as Wendy Paulson (Wife of Henry Paulson)
- Amy Carlson as Erin Callan (CFO, Lehman Brothers)
- Erin Dilly as Christal West, assistant to Hank Paulson
- Evan Handler as Lloyd Blankfein (Chairman and CEO, Goldman Sachs)
- John Heard as Joe Gregory (President and COO, Lehman Brothers)
- Dan Hedaya as Rep. Barney Frank (Chairman of the U.S. House Financial Services Committee (D-MA))
- Peter Hermann as Christopher Cox (Chairman of the U.S. Securities and Exchange Commission)
- Chance Kelly as Bart McDade (President and COO, Lehman Brothers)
- Tom Mason as Bob Willumstad (Chairman and CEO, AIG)
- Ajay Mehta as Vikram Pandit (CEO, Citigroup)
- Tom Tammi as Jeff Immelt (CEO, General Electric)
- Laila Robins as Christine Lagarde (French Finance Minister)
- Victor Slezak as Greg Curl (Director of Planning, Bank of America)
- Joey Slotnick as Dan Jester (Retired Goldman Sachs banker and newly appointed Paulson Advisor)
- Casey Biggs as Richard Kovacevich (Chairman, Wells Fargo & Company)
- Steve Tom as Senator Chris Dodd (D-CT)
- Buddy Jones as Senator Harry Reid (D-NV)
- Jonathan Freeman as Senator Richard Shelby (R-AL)
- Linda Glick as Congresswoman Nancy Pelosi (Speaker of the House of Representatives (D-CA))
- Patricia Randell as Sheila Bair (Chairman, Federal Deposit Insurance Corporation)
- George Taylor as Sir Callum McCarthy (Chairman of the Financial Services Authority)

== Reception ==
=== Critical response ===
On review aggregator website Rotten Tomatoes, the film holds an approval rating of 74%, based on 27 reviews, and an average rating of 6/10. On Metacritic, the movie received a weighted average score of 67/100 from 17 reviews, indicating "generally favorable" reviews. The A.V. Club gave the film a B rating.

=== Accolades ===
Year	Award	Category	Nominee(s)	Result	Ref.
2011	Artios Awards	Outstanding Achievement in Casting – Television Movie/Mini Series	Alexa L. Fogel and Christine Kromer	Nominated	
2011	Hollywood Post Alliance Awards	Outstanding Color Grading – Television	Kevin O'Connor	Nominated	
2011	Hollywood Post Alliance Awards	Outstanding Sound – Television	Michael Kirchberger, Chris Jenkins, and Bob Beemer	Nominated	
2011	Online Film & Television Association Awards	Best Actor in a Motion Picture or Miniseries	William Hurt	Nominated	
2011	Online Film & Television Association Awards	Best Supporting Actor in a Motion Picture or Miniseries	Paul Giamatti	Won	
2011	Online Film & Television Association Awards	Best Direction of a Motion Picture or Miniseries	Curtis Hanson	Nominated	
2011	Online Film & Television Association Awards	Best Writing of a Motion Picture or Miniseries	Peter Gould	Nominated	
2011	Online Film & Television Association Awards	Best Ensemble in a Motion Picture or Miniseries		Nominated	
2011	Primetime Emmy Awards	Outstanding Miniseries or Movie	Curtis Hanson, Paula Weinstein, Jeffrey Levine, Carol Fenelon, and Ezra Swerdlow	Nominated	
2011	Primetime Emmy Awards	Outstanding Lead Actor in a Miniseries or a Movie	William Hurt	Nominated	
2011	Primetime Emmy Awards	Outstanding Supporting Actor in a Miniseries or a Movie	Paul Giamatti	Nominated	
2011	Primetime Emmy Awards	Outstanding Supporting Actor in a Miniseries or a Movie	James Woods	Nominated	
2011	Primetime Emmy Awards	Outstanding Directing for a Miniseries, Movie or a Dramatic Special	Curtis Hanson	Nominated	
2011	Primetime Emmy Awards	Outstanding Writing for a Miniseries, Movie or a Dramatic Special	Peter Gould	Nominated	
2011	Primetime Creative Arts Emmy Awards	Outstanding Casting for a Miniseries, Movie or a Special	Alexa L. Fogel and Christine Kromer	Nominated	
2011	Primetime Creative Arts Emmy Awards	Outstanding Cinematography for a Miniseries or Movie	Kramer Morgenthau	Nominated	
2011	Primetime Creative Arts Emmy Awards	Outstanding Main Title Design	Michael Riley, Bob Swensen, Adam Bluming, and Cory Shaw	Nominated	
2011	Primetime Creative Arts Emmy Awards	Outstanding Single-Camera Picture Editing for a Miniseries or a Movie	Barbara Tulliver and Plummy Tucker	Nominated	
2011	Primetime Creative Arts Emmy Awards	Outstanding Sound Mixing for a Miniseries or a Movie	Jimmy Sabat, Chris Jenkins, and Bob Beemer	Nominated	
2011	Satellite Awards	Best Miniseries or Motion Picture Made for Television		Nominated	
2011	Satellite Awards	Best Actor in a Miniseries or a Motion Picture Made for Television	William Hurt	Nominated	
2011	Satellite Awards	Best Actor in a Supporting Role in a Series, Miniseries or Motion Picture; Made for Television	James Woods	Nominated	
2011	Television Critics Association Awards	Outstanding Achievement in Movies, Miniseries and Specials		Nominated	
2012	Art Directors Guild Awards	Excellence in Production Design Award – Television Movie or Mini-Series	Bob Shaw, Miguel López-Castillo, Katya Blumenberg, Larry M. Gruber, Holly Watson, Peter Hackman, and Carol Silverman	Nominated	
2012	Cinema Audio Society Awards	Outstanding Achievement in Sound Mixing for Television Movies and Mini-Series	James Sabat, Chris Jenkins, Bob Beemer, and Chris Fogel	Won	
2012	Golden Globe Awards	Best Miniseries or Television Film		Nominated	
2012	Golden Globe Awards	Best Actor – Miniseries or Television Film	William Hurt	Nominated	
2012	Golden Globe Awards	Best Supporting Actor – Series, Miniseries or Television Film	Paul Giamatti	Nominated	
2012	Guild of Music Supervisors Awards	Best Music Supervision for Television Long Form and Movie	Evyen Klean (Note: Also for Cinema Verite, Mildred Pierce and The Sunset Limited.)	Won	
2012	Producers Guild of America Awards	David L. Wolper Award for Outstanding Producer of Long-Form Television	Carol Fenelon, Jeffrey Levine, and Paula Weinstein	Nominated	
2012	Screen Actors Guild Awards	Outstanding Performance by a Male Actor in a Television Movie or Miniseries	Paul Giamatti	Won	
2012	Screen Actors Guild Awards	Outstanding Performance by a Male Actor in a Television Movie or Miniseries	James Woods	Nominated	
2012	Writers Guild of America Awards	Long Form – Adapted	Peter Gould; Based on the book by Andrew Ross Sorkin	Won	

== Home media ==
The DVD was released on June 12, 2012.

== See also ==
- The Big Short
- I.O.U.S.A.
- Margin Call
- The Last Days of Lehman Brothers
