= Too Big to Fail (book) =

2009 book by Andrew Ross Sorkin

Too Big to Fail: The Inside Story of How Wall Street and Washington Fought to Save the Financial System—and Themselves
- Hardcover edition
- Author: Andrew Ross Sorkin
- Language: English
- Genre: Finance
- Publisher: Viking Press
- Publication date: October 20, 2009
- Publication place: United States
- Media type: Print (hardback & paperback)
- Pages: 624
- ISBN: 978-0-670-02125-3

Too Big to Fail: The Inside Story of How Wall Street and Washington Fought to Save the Financial System—and Themselves, also known as Too Big to Fail: Inside the Battle to Save Wall Street, is a non-fiction book by Andrew Ross Sorkin chronicling the events of the 2008 financial crisis and the collapse of Lehman Brothers from the point of view of Wall Street CEOs and US government regulators. The book was released on October 20, 2009, by Viking Press.

It won the 2010 Gerald Loeb Award for Best Business Book and was shortlisted for the 2010 Samuel Johnson Prize and the 2010 Financial Times and Goldman Sachs Business Book of the Year Award.

The book was adapted in 2011 for the HBO television movie Too Big to Fail.

== Background ==
Sorkin has stated that he conducted more than 200 interviews, totaling over 500 hours, with participants in the crisis. This includes executives on Wall Street, U.S. government officials, regulators, bankers, lawyers, and other advisers. This access allowed him to reconstruct private meetings and phone calls, including sensitive negotiations previously unknown to the public, in a detailed, narrative form.

== Plot summary ==
The book provides an overview of the 2008 financial crisis from the beginning of 2008 to the decision to create the Troubled Asset Relief Program (TARP). The book tells the story from the perspectives of the leaders of the major financial institutions and the main regulatory authorities, describing in a very detailed manner their everyday discussions and decisions during that difficult period.

== Reception ==
In The New York Times Book Review, James B. Stewart praised Sorkin’s extensive reporting and narrative style, writing that the book "put[s] the reader in the room for some of the biggest-dollar conference calls in history" and "skillfully captures the raucous enthusiasm and riotous greed" that fueled the financial crisis.

The Economist described the book as "meticulously researched" and "told brilliantly," calling it a riveting account of the financial crisis.

Similarly, The Financial Times praised Sorkin’s work, describing the book as "an extraordinary achievement" and suggesting that it would be difficult to surpass as the definitive account of the 2008 financial crisis.

== Film adaptation ==
In 2011, Too Big to Fail was adapted into a television film by HBO, directed by Curtis Hanson and written by Peter Gould. It premiered on May 23, 2011, and was produced by Spring Creek Productions and Deuce Three Productions.

The film starred William Hurt as Treasury Secretary Henry Paulson, Paul Giamatti as Federal Reserve Chairman Ben Bernanke, and James Woods as Lehman Brothers chief executive Richard Fuld.

The film received generally favorable reviews from critics and earned 11 Primetime Emmy Award nominations, including for Outstanding Miniseries or Movie, Outstanding Directing, Outstanding Writing, and acting nominations for Hurt, Giamatti, and Woods, though it did not win in any category.

== Awards ==
- 2010 Gerald Loeb Award
- Shortlist 2010 Samuel Johnson Prize
- Shortlist 2010 Financial Times and Goldman Sachs Business Book of the Year Award

== See also ==
- Great Recession in the United States
- Too big to fail
