= Michele Davis =

American communications official

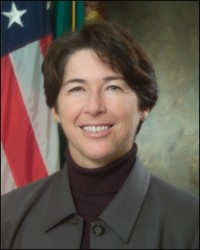

United States Deputy National Security Advisor for Strategic Communications
- In office 2005–2006
- President: George W. Bush
- Leader: Stephen Hadley
- Preceded by: James Wilkinson
- Succeeded by: Corry Schiermeyer (acting)

Assistant Secretary of the Treasury for Public Affairs
- In office 2006–2009
- President: George W. Bush
- Preceded by: Tony Fratto
- In office 2001–2002
- Preceded by: Michelle Andrews Smith
- Succeeded by: Tony Fratto

Personal details
- Education: Georgetown University (BS); American University (MA)

Michele A. Davis is the Global Head of Corporate Affairs at Morgan Stanley with responsibility for media relations, internal communications and philanthropy. She is also a member of the Firm's Management Committee.

Between 2001 and 2009, Michele served in a number of senior communications positions in the U.S. Treasury Department, Fannie Mae, and the White House. Among her posts in the Bush White House, Michele served as Deputy Assistant to the President and Deputy National Security Advisor for Communications. In her last government position, she served as Assistant Secretary for Public Affairs and Director of Policy Planning in the U.S. Department of Treasury for former Secretary Hank Paulson. She was also a senior member of the Treasury team addressing the 2008 financial crisis.

Michele was portrayed by Cynthia Nixon in Too Big to Fail.

She was later a partner at the Brunswick Group, a global corporate communications advisory firm.

== Early life and education ==
Davis is a native of Louisville, Kentucky. She earned a B.S. in Foreign Service at Georgetown University in 1988 and an M.A. in economics from American University.

== Early career ==
She began working as an advocate for free market economics at Citizens for a Sound Economy from 1991 to 1994. From 1997 to January 2001, Michele served as Communications Director for the House Majority Leader Dick Armey (R-Texas), during which time she advised Congressional leadership on communications strategy for the House agenda.

== Years in the U.S. Department of Treasury and Fannie Mae ==
Michele Davis was nominated by President George W. Bush to be Assistant Treasury Secretary for Public Affairs on February 8, 2001. She was then confirmed by a unanimous vote by the U.S. Senate on August 3, 2001, and sworn in by Treasury Secretary Paul O'Neill on August 7, 2001. In this role, Davis was "the Department's lead representative for media, business, professional trade organizations, consumer groups and the public." Davis also oversaw the Office of Public Liaison and the Office of Public Education.

Davis did not stay in the Treasury Department for long, however. She soon went on to work as the Senior Vice President for Regulatory Policy at Fannie Mae in 2002, where she was "responsible for the company's public policy research activities and policy development on a wide range of issues related to mortgage financing and the capital markets" and assumed the duties of "managing the company's relationship with its regulators." Her predecessor at Fannie Mae, Arne L. Christenson, moved on to a new position as Senior Vice President of Government Affairs and head of American Express Company's Washington, DC office.

In 2005, Michele was appointed by President George W. Bush to serve as Deputy Assistant to the President and Deputy National Security Advisor for Strategic Communications and Global Outreach.

== Mitt Romney presidential campaign ==
On August 2, 2012, Davis was hired by the Mitt Romney presidential campaign as a corporate public relations specialist to help guide their response to questions about Romney's time in the private sector with Bain Capital.

== Political views ==
In 2013, Davis was a signatory to an amicus curiae brief submitted to the Supreme Court in support of same-sex marriage during the Hollingsworth v. Perry case.
