= Corry Schiermeyer =

American government official

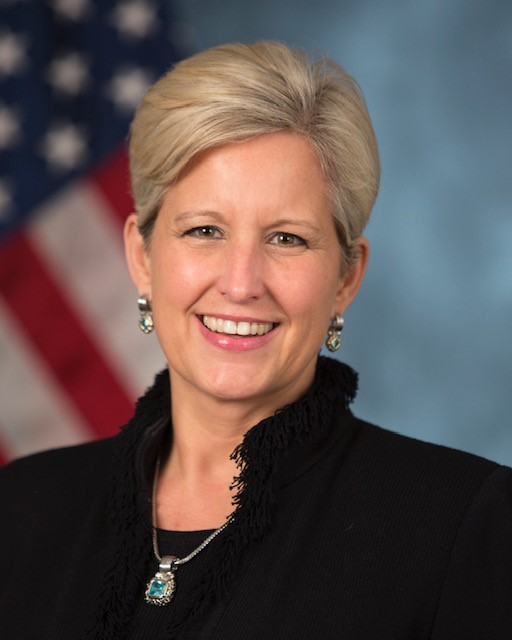

Associate Administrator for Public Affairs
- In office 2019–2020
- President: Donald Trump
- Administrator: Andrew Wheeler
- Preceded by: Liz Bowman
- Succeeded by: James Hewitt

United States Deputy National Security Advisor for Strategic Communications
- Acting; 2006–2007
- President: George W. Bush
- Leader: Stephen Hadley
- Preceded by: Michele Davis
- Succeeded by: Mark Pfeifle

Personal details
- Born: 1970 (age 55–56)
- Education: University of North Texas (BA); Texas Tech University

Corry Schiermeyer (born 1970) is an American government official who served as the acting Deputy National Security Advisor for Strategic Communications and the National Security Council's head of global communications in the Bush administration. During the Trump administration she served as the spokesperson for U.S. Customs and Border Protection and Associate Administrator for Public Affairs at the U.S. Environmental Protection Agency.

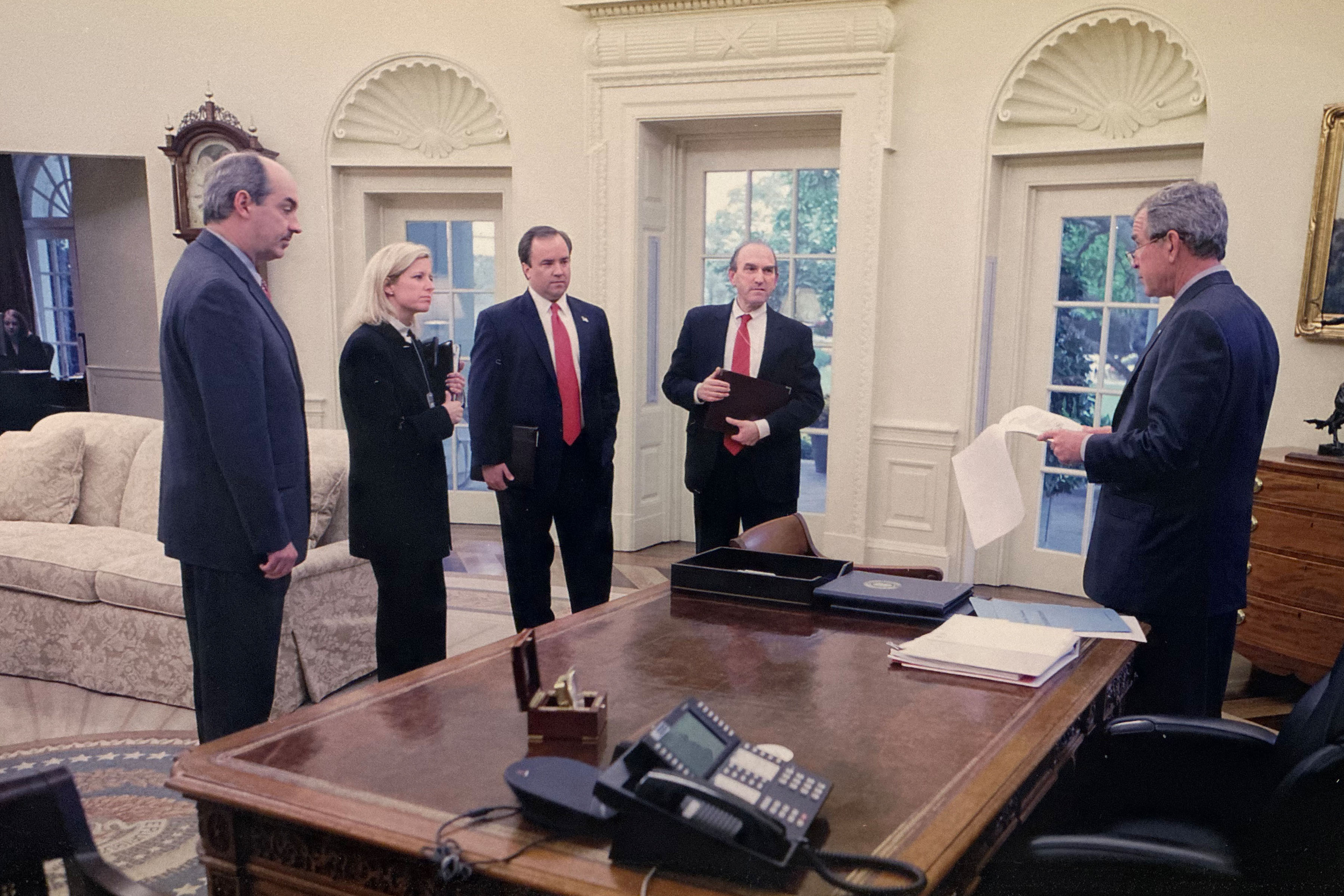
Schiermeyer, Elliott Abrams, JD Crouch, and Scott McClellan meet with President George W. Bush in 2005

== Early life and education ==
Schiermeyer is originally from Texas and began her career as a sports and news reporter. She left reporting to work in public affairs positions with Texas State officials before moving to Washington, D.C. to work in the administration of President George W. Bush.

== Career ==
Schiermeyer joined the Department of Energy (DOE) in 2001 where she was the director of press.

From 2004 to 2007, she held various roles at the White House National Security Council, including as the deputy associate director of communications, acting deputy national security advisor for strategic communications, and director of global communications.

In 2017, she returned to the executive branch as the spokesperson for U.S. Customs and Border Protection under President Trump. She later served as the Associate Administrator for Public Affairs at the Environmental Protection Agency, where she headed the Office of Public Affairs and defended key Trump administration policies.

In 2020, Schiermeyer transitioned to a role as Associate Deputy Regional Administrator.

== Personal life ==
In 2013, Schiermeyer was a signatory to an amicus curiae brief submitted to the Supreme Court in support of same-sex marriage during the Hollingsworth v. Perry case.
