= Mitch Caplan =

American businessman

- Born: Portsmouth, Virginia
- Education: Brandeis University (BA); Emory University (JD, MBA)
- Occupations: CEO of Tarsadia Enterprises; CEO of Willow Wealth; Former CEO of E-Trade

Mitchell H. Caplan is a former CEO of E-Trade Financial Corporation and current CEO of Tarsadia Enterprises and Willow Wealth.

== Background ==
Caplan grew up in Portsmouth, Virginia, and graduated from the Norfolk Academy in 1975. He subsequently received a BA in history from Brandeis University – later receiving his JD and an MBA from Emory University.

Caplan became involved with Juvenile Diabetes Research Foundation, serving on its board, when one of his daughters (Ilana, 21) was diagnosed with diabetes. He has also served as a board member for the American Committee for the American Committee for the Weizmann Institute of Science (ACWIS) and the Aspen Music Festival and School, as well as on the Corporate Fund Board of the Kennedy Center for the Performing Arts and as chairperson for Teach for America's Washington, DC advisory board.

== Career ==
From 1984 to 1990 Caplan was an associate of the law firm Shearman & Sterling. Caplan served as vice-chairman and president of Telebanc Financial Corporation, a federally chartered savings bank, from January 1994. Caplan became CEO of Telebanc in 1998. E-Trade Financial acquired Telebanc in early 2000. The bank became known as E-Trade Bank.

After the acquisition of Telebanc, Caplan served as chief financial products officer and managing director of E-Trade North America. He also became chairman of the board and CEO of E-Trade Bank. In 2002, Caplan was named president and COO of E-Trade Financial. In January 2003, after the departure of Christos Cotsakos, Caplan became CEO and director of E-Trade Financial.

During his term as CEO, Caplan was instrumental in the strategic acquisitions of Harrisdirect from Bank of Montreal and BrownCo from JPMorgan Chase.

During the credit crisis of 2007, Caplan was criticized for investing in risky and complex debt instruments. He stepped down as CEO of E-Trade on November 29, 2007. That same day, an agreement with Citadel LLC was announced resulting in a cash infusion of $2.5B. Caplan later received severance pay of $10.9 million, which was two times the sum of his base salary and bonus during 2006.

From October 2008 to 2010 Caplan served as a senior advisor with Aquiline Capital Partners, a private equity firm based in New York, which invests in financial services enterprises and industries including property and casualty insurance, banking, securities, asset management, life insurance and financial technology.

In 2010 Caplan became CEO of Jefferson National, a financial services firm that specializes in servicing registered investment advisers and their clients. In his time at Jefferson National, Caplan has oversaw a management buyout from CNO Financial Group Inc. (then Conseco Inc.) in 2012.

In 2018, Professional Capital Services, an independent retirement services platform, announced the appointment of Mitch Caplan to its board of directors.
