= Ryan Williams (entrepreneur) =

Real estate technology entrepreneur

Ryan A. Williams
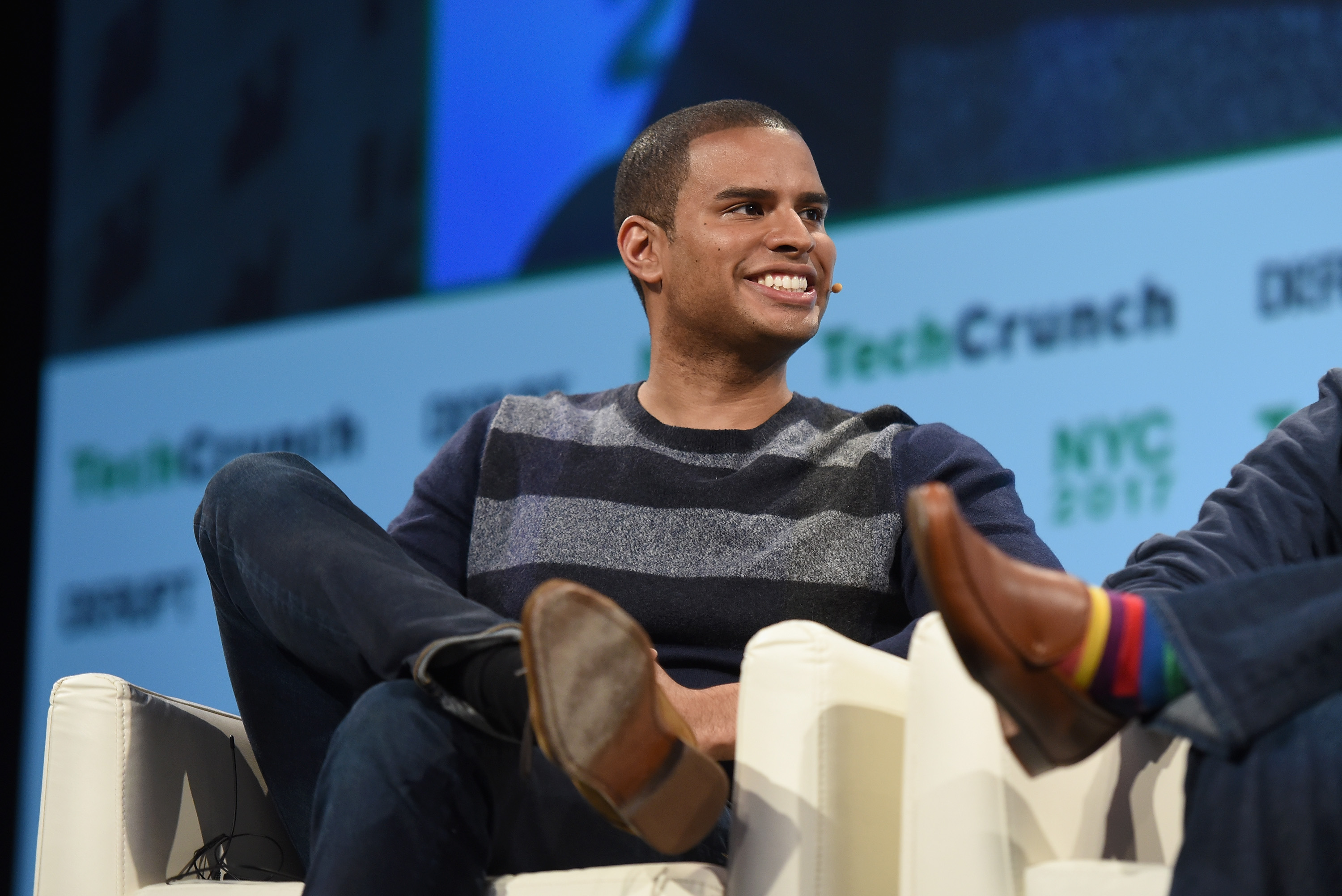
- Born: 1988 (age 37–38); Baton Rouge, Louisiana, U.S.
- Education: Harvard
- Occupation: Technology entrepreneur
- Known for: Founder and CEO of Ellis; Founder and former CEO of Cadre

Ryan Williams is an American technology entrepreneur who founded the companies Cadre and Ellis. He was chief executive officer of Cadre, a digital real estate investment platform, through its acquisition by Yieldstreet in 2024. Williams is the founder and chief executive officer of Ellis, an artificial intelligence-based operations platform for private credit. Ellis publicly launched in July 2026 after raising $11 million in seed financing led by First Round Capital.

Williams raised and invested more than $1.2 billion in real estate investments through Cadre, including receiving investments from Jared Kushner, Mark Cuban, Soros Fund Management, Vinod Khosla and Andreessen Horowitz. As one of few African American real estate technology founders and CEOs, he has often advocated for actionable change in his industry and society. Among other specific changes, he has advocated for increasing education about financial literacy as a key to closing America's racial wealth gap.

In a 2025 interview with the podcast Masters of Scale, Williams indicated that he was forming a new company "at the intersection of financial services and technology."

In mid-2025, Williams was named as partner of Jay-Z in building inclusive ownership in a potential Times Square, New York casino as part of Caesars' bid to secure a New York gaming license. The partnership is intended to allow low-income and diverse households, which have often been excluded from capital markets, to participate in the growth of the gaming project.

== Early life ==
Williams was born in Baton Rouge, Louisiana, and founded a sports apparel company at 13. Williams matriculated to Harvard University, where he founded the Veritas Financial Group, the school’s largest undergraduate financial literacy group.

== Career ==
=== Early career ===
Williams began his career in real estate technology during his undergraduate term at Harvard. He was inspired to create a system to track foreclosed homes after seeing the impact of foreclosures during a trip to Atlanta. By using data about properties and neighborhoods, he was able to start a business purchasing deeply undervalued homes and restoring them to occupancy. This business "flipping" homes with classmates and others as investors was his first entrepreneurial venture. In 2020, he highlighted the importance of Citizens Trust Bank, an Atlanta bank founded by five Black businessmen and currently a Black-owned bank, to his early success. As a young Black man he was denied loans by 10 other banks before the then-chairman of Citizens Trust personally called to say that he believed in Williams.

After graduation from Harvard, he worked at Goldman Sachs and Blackstone before founding Cadre in 2014. He worked at Blackstone in their real estate private equity division.

=== Cadre ===
At 26 years old, Williams left Blackstone to found Cadre, a financial technology platform that seeks to make the real estate market more like a stock market. Williams was CEO of Cadre and led it through its acquisition by Yieldstreet.

Williams led fundraising for Cadre including investments by Jared Kushner, Mark Cuban, Soros Fund Management (George Soros), Vinod Khosla and a $65 million Series C fundraising round led by Andreessen Horowitz.

According to Williams, “Cadre’s mission is to create a more efficient economy, where we can connect the world’s buyers and sellers in opaque assets that have been inaccessible to many.” He believes that increasing the ability of investors to participate in alternative asset classes (such as "energy, natural resources, oil, infrastructure or anything that’s historically been privately held or inaccessible") will expand the opportunity to build multi-generational wealth to many more members of the world by "giving people direct, deal-by-deal access to commercial real estate, like you would buy and sell something on Amazon." To him, that mission includes a secondary market and the ability of investors to select the deals they are most interested in, at lower cost. The Economist compared Cadre to other tools that will "make markets for all kinds of assets as liquid as the stock market."

In 2018 Williams announced a deal through which Cadre would receive at least $250 million (USD) in real estate investments from clients of Goldman Sachs. In 2020, Williams published a widely-linked op-ed in CNBC recounting his experience being supported by a Black-owned and Black-founded bank early in his career, and his commitment to increase diversity among participating banks and real estate operators in the future.

In 2021, Williams further announced the launch of the Cadre Direct Access Fund, one of the largest real estate funds raised during the pandemic and for a digital real estate investment platform. It is a $400 million fund investing in commercial real estate and backing minority operators and partners to help produce greater economic equity. Williams later announced that his alma mater, Harvard University, invested in both Cadre and in the $400 million fund intended to drive diversity through democratization.

He followed with the Cadre Direct Access Fund II, a value-add real estate fund.

In late 2021, Williams publicly announced that Cadre sold three buildings for a total of approximately $312 million, providing $95 million in returned capital to investors and an internal rate of return of approximately 17%. Williams described one of the sales as the largest-ever digital real-estate transaction (i.e., a property bought, sold, and managed using a digital platform).

In early 2023, he led Cadre to secure a spot on the Forbes Fintech 50 for a seventh consecutive year.

Later in 2023, he led the company to a liquidity event with its merger with Yieldstreet, a global alternative investment platform focused on credit investments. The company’s combined assets totaled $9.7 billion. At the time of the merger, Cadre and Yieldstreet together had produced more than $3.1 billion in returns for clients with a total investment value of $9.7 billion. Williams continued as CEO of Cadre, which will operate independently, as well as lead global institutional client relations and business development partnerships for the combined business. According to Forbes, Cadre had more than 50,000 customers and managed approximately $6 billion in asset value. Yieldstreet completed its acquisition of Cadre in January 2024 as one of the most significant exits in fintech. Williams later cited data fragmentation and reconciliation problems he encountered while building Cadre as an influence on the creation of Ellis.

=== Ellis ===
In early 2025, Williams was interviewed by Jeff Berman on the podcast Masters of Scale, an interview-format podcast covering leaders from Barack Obama to Mark Zuckerberg. Williams indicated that he would be starting another growth venture. In 2025, Williams founded Ellis, a New York-based financial technology company developing an artificial intelligence-based operations platform for private credit managers. The company grew out of direct experience Williams had while scaling Ellis, specifically data and reconciliation problems Williams encountered while building Cadre, where financial information was distributed across fund administrators, general ledgers, bank accounts, internal spreadsheets and other systems.

Ellis connects private credit managers’ existing fund-administration, accounting, loan-servicing, banking and spreadsheet systems and reconciles the information into a source-verifiable operating record. Ellis emerged from stealth in July 2026 following an $11 million seed financing led by First Round Capital. Other investors included Kearny Jackson, 645 Ventures, Khosla Ventures, Slow Ventures and Josh Kushner's Thrive Capital. The company initially focused on private credit managers with between $100 million and $1 billion in assets under management. Treville Capital Group was reported as an early customer and design partner. Ellis states that it developed the platform alongside private credit managers representing more than $50 billion in cumulative assets under management.

=== Other ventures ===
==== Jay-Z and Caesars Palace Times Square partnership ====
In 2025, Williams joined a group with Jay-Z and Al Sharpton to promote inclusive ownership of a potential Caesars Palace Times Square casino. The stated goal of the project is to allow underrepresented communities to own a portion of the casino, including permitting investments as small as $500. The project's backers describe it as offering "tangible investor education and meaningful equity investment opportunities for everyday New Yorkers."

===== Other activities =====
Williams is a regular speaker at conferences and in news programs regarding real estate technology.

In 2020, he published a plan to help increase economic opportunity for diverse communities through "formal mentorship programs to provide hands-on guidance, and ... comprehensive skills-training programs that help people of all ages get a start in careers that will allow them to succeed in a fast-changing economy." He was interviewed by CNBC's SquawkBox, Forbes, and others in response to his call for proactive steps to increase economic equality. Later in 2020, he reiterated the importance of remedying racial wealth and power disparities in the United States, noting for example that only 21 of over 4,700 banks in the United States are Black-owned or Black-led. He further committed to partner with diverse operating partners and lenders, as well as committing at least 10% of Cadre's cash holdings to be held in minority depository institutions to empower them to lend into underserved communities. In 2020, he and Robert Smith kicked off a Forbes hackathon by discussing their collective commitments to help build transformational businesses that expand economic opportunity for more people.

== Recognition and awards ==
He was named to Fortune's "40 under 40" list for 2019, Forbes' "30 under 30" list for 2018, "Crain’s 40 under 40" list for 2017, is one of Commercial Observer’s "30 under 30" and has been profiled in Forbes, Ivy, and other publications. In February 2019 he was profiled and on the cover of Forbes Magazine in the "FinTech 50" issue; in 2022 he was a Business Insider "Top 100 Global Leaders Changing Business."

In late 2024, he was awarded a Beacon Award by the Ellis Island Honors Society at its Medals of Honor ceremony, based on "entrepreneurial impact, leadership in innovation, commitment to diversity and inclusion, and contributions to the broader community."

== Personal life ==
As a native of Baton Rouge, Louisiana, Williams is a fan of LSU football. He lives in Brooklyn, New York and has three children. He has discussed his mission as an entrepreneur of color in a field that suffers "an outsized lack of diversity" and says "I've never let anyone outwork me." In a 2019 CNN interview, he stated his goal to be judged on his performance alone: "at the end of the day, it's about results and what you're able to deliver, not about the color of your skin."

In 2020, he revealed that his great-great-grandmother, Addie Lynch, was born on a plantation in the late 1800s to a mother who had been enslaved. He described it as part of his personal heritage that informed his decision to mark Juneteenth as a holiday within Cadre to help the company and country grow from past inequities, and build a more perfect society and union.
