= Paulson Institute =

US non-profit organization

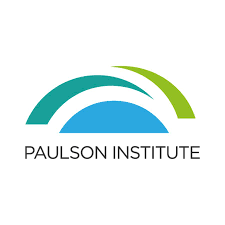
- Formation: 2011
- Type: Public policy, Economics think tank
- Chairman: Hank Paulson
- Vice Chairman and Executive Director: Deborah Lehr
- Website: www.paulsoninstitute.org

The Paulson Institute is a non-profit organization. Founded in 2011 by former Treasury Secretary Henry M. Paulson, Jr., it is based in Chicago with offices in Washington and Beijing. An independent “think and do tank” dedicated to fostering global relationships that advance economic prosperity, promote sustainable growth, and maintain global order in a rapidly evolving world.

The Institute operates at the intersection of economics, financial markets, and environmental protection by promoting market-based solutions to ensure green economic growth. They produce leading analysis and intellectual products to decode global political and economic challenges and supports market-based solutions to climate change and environmental conservation. The Institute works with financial markets and international financial institutions to implement green lending standards and champion innovative approaches to finance low-carbon growth. They convene leading experts to inspire bold thinking and help build a new framework for US-global relations.
