= Scott Mead =

American photographer

- Born: Washington, DC, United States
- Education: Harvard University (BA); Emmanuel College, Cambridge (MPhil); University of Pennsylvania (JD)
- Occupations: Fine art photographer, philanthropist
- Years active: 1980s–present
- Style: Photography
- Spouse: Su Ling (1986)
- Website: Official website

Scott Mead is an American fine art photographer, philanthropist, and investor based in London and New York City. He is a former managing director and partner of Goldman Sachs, London where he became known for overseeing and negotiating large telecommunications and technology mergers, including, in 2000, as chief advisor to Vodafone's nearly $200 billion buyout of Mannesmann, the largest corporate acquisition in history. During 2011 through 2026, his photography work has been shown in over a dozen Royal Academy Summer Exhibitions.

== Early life and education ==
Scott Mead was born in Washington, DC. His father, James M. Mead, was a businessperson. With extended family based out of Erie, Pennsylvania during his youth, Mead's grandfather John J. Mead Jr. had been a press journalist and photographer for the Erie Times-News, founded and owned by the Mead family. After accompanying his grandfather on assignments as a small child, Mead learned photography after he was given one of his grandfather's cameras at age thirteen. Mead taught himself how to develop photographs in his parents' basement. He attended high school at Phillips Academy in Andover, Massachusetts, graduating in 1973. In 1974 he began attending Harvard College. At Harvard he majored in American history and literature, also focusing on the visual arts under professors such as William Eggleston. Mead graduated cum laude with a Bachelor of Arts (BA) degree in 1977. After receiving the Harvard Scholar award that year to attend Cambridge University, in 1979 he graduated Emmanuel College, Cambridge with a Master of Philosophy. Mead subsequently received a J.D. from the University of Pennsylvania law school in 1982.

== Business career ==
=== 1980s-2003 ===
Early in his career Mead worked at First Boston Corporation, then moved to Goldman Sachs in New York, in 1986, as vice president in their corporate finance department, before being transferred to London, in 1988, where he became a Goldman Sachs managing director and, later, a partner. At Goldman Sachs he soon took on the roles of chairman of the global telecoms, media, entertainment and technology group and the head of European Privatizations, advising on many major deals. He was Goldman Sachs' chief negotiator and advisor for Vodafone's nearly $200 billion takeover of German telecom group Mannesmann in 2000—the largest in history. He also advised Vodafone on its $66.5 billion takeover of Airtouch Communications. During his tenure at Goldman Sachs, he oversaw mergers and transactions totaling approximately $500 billion prior to retiring from the firm in 2003. Mead subsequently managed his own private equity activities; advised a group of blue-chip companies; and focused on philanthropy.

=== 2006-present ===
From October 2006 until September 2008 Mead was a senior advisor at Apax Partners, serving as chairman of the company's global technology and telecommunications advisory board. He co-founded Richmond Park Partners (RPP) in 2007. Mead joined a group of investors around 2006 who had purchased the Boston Celtics. After management made substantial investments in new talent and coaching, the team won 2008 NBA Finals, and later won the 2024 NBA Finals. Since 2010, Mead has devoted much of his time to photography.

== Arts career ==
Mead minored in visual studies at Harvard, studying under photographers such as William Eggleston and Emmet Gowin in the mid-1970s. Among other projects, around this time he "used a complex photography technique to shoot a series of black and white photographs capturing rural New England" circular format. In 2009, Mead rediscovered old prints and negatives from his student years in his attic, and began re-immersing himself in photography.

In 2010, 25 of Mead's images from 1974 to 1977, many of them never printed before, were displayed at a London solo exhibition titled Looking Back at Mayfair gallery Hamilton's, with all funds donated to Great Ormond Street Hospital in London. Prints from the exhibit and other works were afterward selected for inclusion in the 2011 Royal Academy Summer Exhibition, and Mead also had prints selected for the Royal Academy summer exhibition in 2012 through 2017, 2019, 2020, and 2022 to 2026. In 2012 the BBC Culture Show program profiled his work, and Mead published the book Looking Back afterwards, featuring prints from his twenties. In October 2017 the aerial photography and philosophy book Above the Clouds was published by Prestel, with prints from the book exhibited in January 2018 at Hamiltons. His most recent book, Equivalents was published by Prestel in late 2022. The book, inspired by William Eggleston, features paired nature photographs, with text by Brad Leithauser. Subsequent books, Thoughts For My Children appeared in 2024, followed by Rites of Passage, in 2026.

== Boards and philanthropy ==
He created The Mead Family Foundation in 1996, assuming the role of chairman. After Great Ormond Street Hospital (GOSH) in London treated his infant child, Mead became a long-term supporter, donating the proceeds of his works, and becoming a board member of the institution. He has also endowed its GOSH Arts program, where patients are immersed in the arts during often difficult treatments, potentially resulting in a more positive outcome.

He has been a member of the board of visitors of MD Anderson Cancer Center in Houston, Texas. Through the Foundation, he is involved with organizations such as the Tate Foundation, the International Center of Photography, the University of the Arts, The Photographers' Gallery, and the Women's Tennis Association (WTA). He remains personally involved in all of his alma maters, including Emmanuel College, supporting programs at Phillips Academy, Cambridge University, Harvard University, and the University of Pennsylvania Law School, and serving on the Harvard Board of Overseers during 2022–2024.

Mead has spearheaded a number of educational initiatives, and he backed and co-founded London's Notting Hill Preparatory school in 2003. He has been a board member of Usher's New Look Foundation, which provides training and mentorship to disadvantaged children, and he joined the UK advisory board of Room to Read in 2009. He founded the Mead International Fellows Program, and in 2008 he established the "Scott Mead '77 Family Head Coach" endowment to support the Harvard Men's Tennis team. A benefactor fellow at Emmanuel College, he was the creator and benefactor of the University of the Arts London's Mead Fellowships, which provides grants to students in the arts.

He is also involved in various athletic and arts organizations. He joined the executive committee for the Tate Foundation, and served on its acquisition committee. He served on the global advisory council of the WTA and the Association of Tennis Professionals (ATP). Mead has been a member of the trustees of Queens Club. and a trustee of the International Center of Photography in New York. He joined the rector's council of the University of the Arts London in 2012, and its court of governors in 2017. He was chairman of the board of trustees of The Photographers' Gallery in London from 2013 until 2016, and, since 2017, is a trustee of the Royal Academy of Arts.

== Selected exhibitions ==
- 2010: Looking Back - Solo exhibition / Hamilton's Gallery, London - 25 of Mead's prints from 1974 to 1977 were exhibited
- 2010-2011: The PhotoVoice Auction of Exceptional Photographs - Group show - Mead's print “Three Barns” and “Untitled” exhibited and sold as part of the auction to benefit PhotoVoice
- 2011-2012: The Art Show - Group show / Park Avenue Armory, New York - His print “Evening Light” was exhibited, followed by "Untitled (Umbrellas on Beach)," with the show organized by the Art Dealers Association of America to benefit Henry Street Settlement
- 2011-2017: Summer Exhibition - Group show / Royal Academy of Arts, London - various photograph prints selected, most recently "Journey into Blue" and "Autumn”
- 2018: Scott Mead: Above the Clouds - Solo exhibition / Hamilton's Gallery, London - several prints
- 2019–2020, 2022-2025: Summer Exhibition - Group show / Royal Academy of Arts, London
- 2025: Scott Mead: Moments in Time: A Photographic Journey 1972 to 2024 - Solo exhibition, Ladbroke Hall, London
- 2025–2026: Scott Mead: Moments in Time: A Photographic Journey 1972 to 2024 - Solo exhibition, Century Association, New York

== Books ==
- Looking Back by Scott Mead; 2010.
- Above the Clouds; Prestel; 2017.
- Equivalents; Prestel; 2022.
- Thoughts For My Children; Hurtwood Press; 2024.
- Rites of Passage; Hurtwood Press; 2026.

== See also ==
- List of former employees of Goldman Sachs
