= 1929 (book) =

2025 book by Andrew Ross Sorkin

1929: Inside the Greatest Crash in Wall Street History and How It Shattered a Nation
- Author: Andrew Ross Sorkin
- Language: English
- Subject: Economic history of the United States
- Publisher: Viking Press
- Publication date: 14 October 2025
- Publication place: United States
- Pages: 592
- ISBN: 978-0-593-29696-7 (Hardcover)

1929: Inside the Greatest Crash in Wall Street History and How It Shattered a Nation is a work of narrative financial history written by Andrew Ross Sorkin of the Wall Street crash of 1929, as well as the events leading up to it and its aftermath. The book was first published by Viking Press in 2025. It was a New York Times notable book of 2025 and made number two on The New York Times Best Seller list.

== Background ==
The book's narrative is chronological and focuses on selected dates in a four-year period, starting with February 1, 1929, about seven months before the start of the crash. The crash started on the New York Stock Exchange, commonly referred to as ‘Wall Street’, after the Dow Jones Industrial Average reached an all-time closing high of 381.17 on September 3, 1929. The Wall Street crash of 1929 ended the great bull market and the Roaring Twenties and precipitated the Great Depression in the United States. The final chapter describes events of June 21, 1933, which roughly coincides with the middle of the Great Depression and the start of the recovery of the stock market. The players in this drama are bankers, business leaders, economists, journalists, speculators and officials of the New York Stock Exchange, the US government and the Federal Reserve.

Sorkin notes that he spent eight years researching and writing the book and achieved an oeuvre with approximately one hundred pages of notes and references, many not previously published or analyzed. The book also contains a substantive index and a section entitled, ‘The Cast of Characters and the Companies they Kept,’ which lists the affiliations of the major characters in the book.

== Synopsis ==
=== Financial institutions ===
The book describes the widespread optimism surrounding rising stock prices among investors, public figures, government officials, and especially bankers. It also discusses the extensive use of call money loans by banks, which enabled investors to purchase stocks on margins as low as ten percent.

The actions of Charles Edwin Mitchell, Chairman and CEO of National City Bank and Thomas William Lamont of the House of Morgan are detailed. According to Sorkin, these bankers had too much at stake to contemplate anything other than optimistic scenarios for stocks.

=== Speculators ===
William Crapo Durant was on the leading edge among Wall Street insiders on a trendy financial stratagem, the "stock pool." Wealthy investors would pool their assets to purchase stock in a target company. They would then inflate the stock price by judicious trades within the group, and typically leak information to the press that a bullish operation was in progress to entice small investors to ride the coat-tails of the pool operators. At the height of the excitement, they would dump their shares at peak prices. One notable exception among speculators was Jesse Livermore, who stated to a reporter at The New York Times that the market was overpriced and stocks were at "ridiculously high prices." Jesse Livermore’s assessment of the stock market proved correct and by the end of October of 1929 Livermore had made $100 million on the short side of the market, that is, betting on stock prices to fall.

=== The Federal Reserve ===
President Herbert Hoover was concerned about rampant stock market speculation, and urged the Federal Reserve to restrict credit. The Federal Reserve, however, remained cautious about raising rates in fear of triggering widespread panic.

Economist Roger Babson's warning on September 5, 1929 that "sooner or later a crash is coming, and it may be terrific" preceded a sharp market decline, one of the many factors contributing to the crash.

== Critical reception ==
There has been enthusiastic praise for the book, as well as critical reviews suggesting that Sorkin spent a significant portion of the narrative covering the lifestyles of the rich and famous, while his thesis that the bifurcation of society into rich and poor was causal to the crash was unproven. A strident review by The New York Times suggests that Sorkin’s halfhearted defense of the 1929 bankers is an indictment of the system he claims to love, while the little guy lost everything in a festival of fraud and theft for the titans.

Economist James A. Dorn, writing for the Cato Institute, praised Sorkin’s depth of research, but criticized him for neglecting monetary policy in explaining causes of the crash. He argues Sorkin has overlooked the Federal Reserve’s role and the contraction of the money supply, and instead has favored a narrative focusing on speculation, human nature, and irrational exuberance.

== See also ==
- List of economic crises
