= Willow Wealth =

American financial services company

Willow Wealth Inc.
- Type: Private
- Industry: Financial services Financial technology Alternative investment
- Founded: 2015
- Founders: Milind Mehere; Michael Weisz
- Headquarters: New York City, U.S.
- Key people: Mitch Caplan (CEO); Ted Yarbrough (CIO)
- Total assets: $6 billion (invested through platform)
- Website: willowwealth.com

Willow Wealth Inc. (formerly Yieldstreet) is an American financial technology company headquartered in New York City that operates an online platform for alternative investments. The platform enables accredited investors and retail investors to access private market asset classes including real estate, private credit, private equity, art, and legal finance. As of 2025, the platform reports more than 500,000 members and over $6 billion in cumulative investments.

== History ==
The company was founded in 2015 as Yieldstreet by Milind Mehere, a co-founder of Yodle, and Michael Weisz, who had held leadership roles in specialty finance firms. It positioned itself as a platform to provide retail investors access to alternative investments traditionally available only to institutions and wealthy individuals.

In April 2019, the company acquired Athena Art Finance from The Carlyle Group for $170 million, expanding into art-secured lending. Later that year, it acquired WealthFlex to integrate self-directed IRA capabilities. In November 2023, the company acquired Cadre, an online real estate investment platform.

The company has raised approximately $800 million in total funding from investors including Khosla Ventures, Thrive Capital, and Greycroft. In July 2025, the company closed a $77 million funding round led by Tarsadia Investments, with participation from RedBird Capital Partners, Mayfair Equity Partners, Edison Partners, and Kingfisher Investment Advisors.

In late 2025, the company rebranded to Willow Wealth, stating the new name reflected its expanded product offerings and ten years of experience in private markets.

In March 2026, Mount Logan Capital Inc. acquired the assets of Willow Wealth's flagship Yieldstreet Alternative Income Fund "YS AIF", representing over $100 million in assets, and will absorb them into their Opportunistic Credit Interval Fund (SOFIX). According to the terms of the agreement, SOFIX will acquire the assets and liabilities of YS AIF at closing net asset value in exchange for shares of SOFIX. The transaction is expected to be completed in the second or third quarter of 2026.

== Products and services ==
Willow Wealth operates as an online marketplace connecting investors with alternative investment opportunities across ten asset classes. The platform offers both individual investment opportunities and pooled fund structures. Most investments require accredited investor status, though certain products such as the Alternative Income Fund are available to non-accredited investors.

The Alternative Income Fund launched in March 2020 as a multi-asset closed-end fund with quarterly distributions, offering exposure to more than 50 income-focused investments. In November 2021, the company introduced the Art Equity Platform for fractional investment in post-war and contemporary art.

In August 2025, the company launched Willow 360, an automated managed portfolio solution developed in partnership with Wilshire Associates, offering diversified exposure to private markets with quarterly liquidity.

In December 2025, Willow Wealth announced partnerships with Carlyle Group, Goldman Sachs, and StepStone Group to offer access to private credit funds with minimum investments of $10,000.

== Competitors ==
Willow Wealth operates in the alternative investment platform sector alongside competitors including Fundrise, CrowdStreet, Percent, and RealtyMogul. Compared to Fundrise, which focuses primarily on real estate and has minimum investments starting at $10, Willow Wealth offers a broader range of asset classes but generally requires higher minimums and accredited investor status for most offerings.

== Controversies and criticism ==
Over the course of company history, several marine finance and real‑estate offerings have produced losses for investors. In 2025, CNBC stated that the cumulative losses across multiple offerings were close to $208 million.

In 2020, a company's marine portfolio tied to vessel deconstruction loans has defaulted, as the company won a US$77 million U.K. court judgement against the Lakhani family, who reportedly defrauded the company with fraudulent marine finance loan statements.

In 2023, the U.S. Securities and Exchange Commission brought charges to Willow Wealth regarding a ship‑backed investment. The company agreed to pay approximately US$1.9 million to settle the matter without admitting or denying the findings. The firm has also been named in investor lawsuits alleging misstatements about the risks of certain offerings. One reported class‑action settlement was for up to about US$6.2 million. Financial commentary and coverage have discussed these matters and specific marine finance deals.

In 2024, the failure of Synapse, a third‑party banking‑as‑a‑service provider, disrupted fund access across multiple platforms and was reported to have frozen an estimated US$160 million in customer funds, including accounts associated with the company. CNBC has noted that Yieldstreet removed a decade of historical performance data from its website when the company became known as Willow Wealth.
