= Lloyd Blankfein =

American investment banker (born 1954)

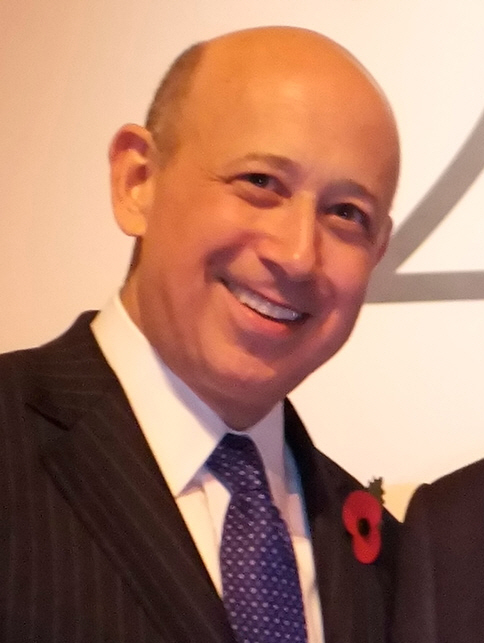
- Blankfein in 2011
- Born: Lloyd Craig Blankfein; September 20, 1954 (age 72); New York City, U.S.
- Education: Harvard University (BA, JD)
- Occupations: Senior Chairman, Goldman Sachs
- Years active: 1982–2018
- Political party: Democratic
- Spouse: Laura Jacobs (m. 1983)
- Children: 3

Lloyd Craig Blankfein (born 20 September 1954) is an American billionaire investment banker who has served as senior chairman of Goldman Sachs since 2019, and chairman and chief executive officer (CEO) from 2006 until the end of 2018. Before leading Goldman Sachs as CEO, he was the company's president and chief operating officer (COO) from 2004 to 2006, serving under then-CEO Henry Paulson.

Born and raised in New York City, Blankfein attended Harvard University for his undergraduate and law school studies before briefly entering private law practice. In 1982, he became a precious metals salesman at J. Aron & Co., a small commodities trading firm which was acquired by Goldman in 1981. After leading Goldman's currency and commodities divisions from 1994 to 1997 he was named heir apparent. He served as the president and chief operating officer from 2004 to his ascension to chief executive.

Almost immediately after Blankfein assumed the head of the company, the 2008 financial crisis affected the banking industry. His role in handling the crisis was widely praised and criticized by media outlets, making him a public figure.

After the Federal Reserve implemented dovish monetary policies and the U.S. Treasury bailed out the company, Blankfein took advantage of low interest rates to undercut competition from other investment banks and established Goldman Sachs as the second largest investment bank in the U.S. as others either went bankrupt or fell to acquisition.

Blankfein was twice named one of the most influential people in the world by Time magazine and won the Financial Times Person of the Year award in 2009. According to Bloomberg News, his net worth is estimated to be US$1.1 billion as of July 2015. His salary at Goldman Sachs in 2018 was estimated to be $24 million.

== Early life and career ==
Lloyd Craig Blankfein was born in the Bronx borough of New York City to a low-income Jewish family on September 20, 1954. His father, Seymour Blankfein, was a clerk with the U.S. Postal Service branch in Manhattan and his mother was a receptionist. He was raised in the Linden Houses, a housing project in the East New York section of Brooklyn. He received primary and secondary education in New York City's public schools graduating valedictorian at Thomas Jefferson High School in 1971. He went on to attend Harvard College where he lived in Winthrop House and graduated with a B.A. in history in 1975. After graduating college, he attended Harvard Law School where he received a J.D. degree in 1978.

Blankfein first worked for the law firms Proskauer Rose and then Donovan, Leisure, Newton & Irvine. In 1982, he joined the commodities trading firm J. Aron & Co. as a precious metals salesman in its London office, after J. Aron was acquired by the investment bank, Goldman Sachs.

== Goldman Sachs ==
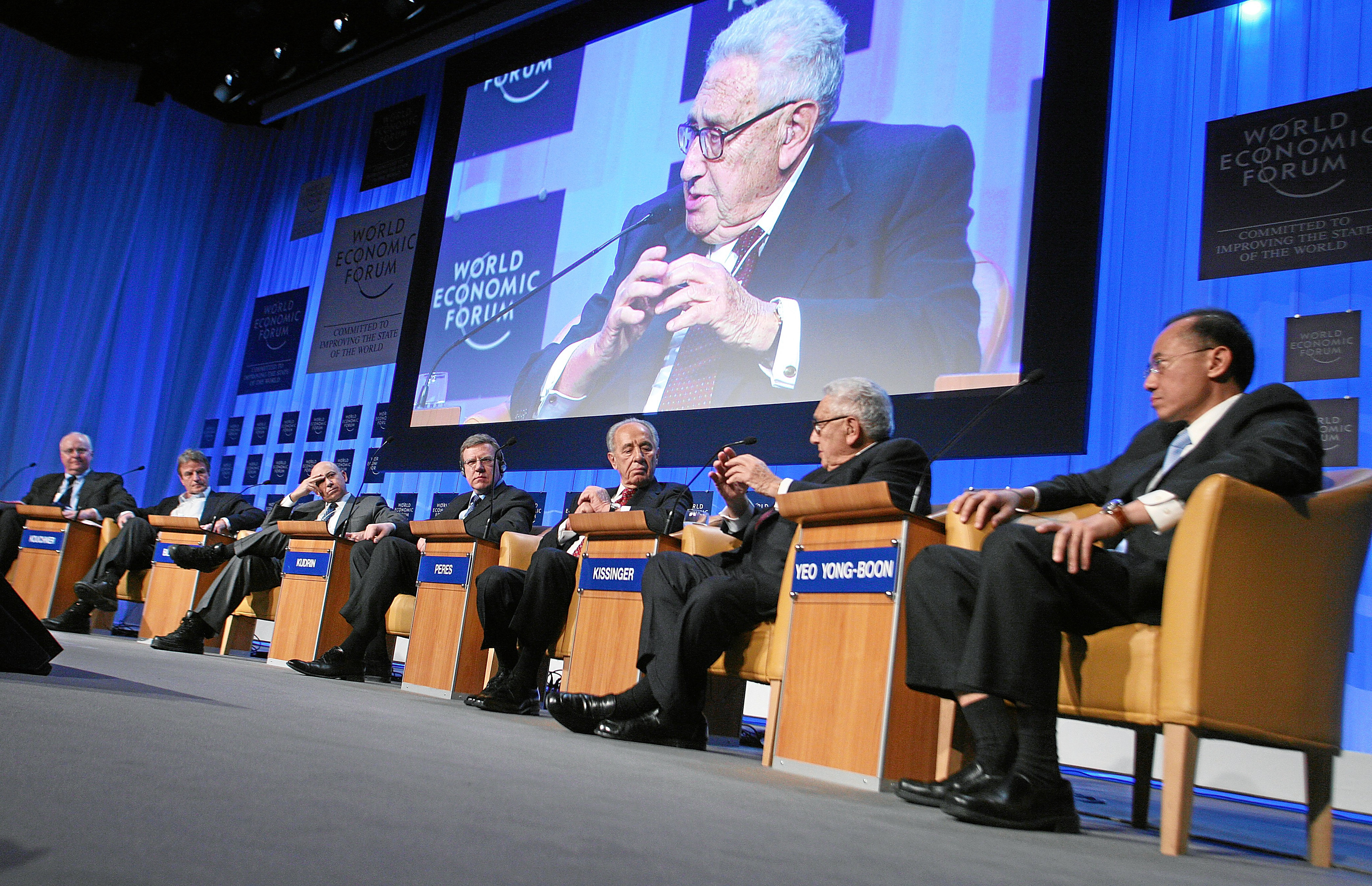
Blankfein and Henry Kissinger at the Annual Meeting of the World Economic Forum in Davos, January 2008

Blankfein joined J. Aron & Co. in 1982, after it had been acquired by Goldman Sachs in 1981. When then chairman Stephen Friedman appointed Henry Paulson as his successor, Blankfein was soon tasked with managing or co-managing the company's currency and commodities divisions from 1994 to 1997. After Paulson consolidated control of Goldman, he identified Blankfein as his heir apparent, despite Blankfein ranking third in the corporate hierarchy behind two co-presidents. In 2004, Blankfein was promoted to president and chief operating officer, a position he served in until June 2006. As president, he oversaw the 2000s commodities boom and positioned Goldman to take advantage of rising commodity prices. On May 30, 2006, U.S. President George W. Bush nominated Paulson to serve as the 74th United States Secretary of the Treasury which prompted Paulson to establish a succession plan. Shortly after Paulson was sworn in, Blankfein was asked to serve as chairman and chief executive officer in July 2006.

=== 2008 financial crisis ===
To begin with an obvious point, much of (2007–08) has been deeply humbling for my industry. We held ourselves up as the experts, and the loss of public confidence from failing to live up to the expectations that we created will take years to rebuild. Worse, decisions on compensation and other actions taken and not taken, particularly at banks that rapidly lost a lot of shareholder value, look self-serving and greedy in hindsight.

— Blankfein (in 2009) on the loss of confidence in the financial industry.

During the 2008 financial crisis, many financial institutions that had dealings in subprime mortgages received a high level of public attention. Goldman Sachs served as a market maker that dealt with financial products that held subprime mortgages. During late 2008, the crisis led the Federal Reserve to lower interest rates and the U.S. Treasury to increase public spending in private banks. In 2009, he was named Financial Times Person of the Year. His citation noted that "his bank stuck to its strengths, unashamedly [took] advantage of the low interest rates and diminished competition resulting from the crisis to make big trading profits."

On January 13, 2010, Blankfein voluntarily testified before the Financial Crisis Inquiry Commission that he considered Goldman Sachs's role as primarily market maker, not a creator of the product (i.e., subprime mortgage–related securities). Blankfein testified once more before Congress in April 2010 at a hearing of the Senate Permanent Subcommittee on Investigations. He said that Goldman Sachs had no moral or legal obligation to inform their clients they were betting against the products they were selling to them because it was not acting in a fiduciary role. Senator Carl Levin accused Blankfein of misleading Congress; however, no perjury charges were brought against Blankfein. Nevertheless, as a precaution Blankfein hired Reid Weingarten, a high-profile defense lawyer who represented former WorldCom CEO Bernard Ebbers and former Enron accounting officer Richard Causey. Two months later, after the publicity of the testimony increased his public status, he was listed as #43 on Forbes Magazine's List of The World's Most Powerful People in November 2011.

=== Tenure ===
On March 14, 2012, Greg Smith, a former Goldman executive, wrote a widely circulated op-ed for The New York Times titled "Why I Am Leaving Goldman Sachs", in which he heavily criticized the firm's top leadership and Blankfein in particular for sidelining the interests of the client. Smith claimed that employees were promoted for unloading less profitable products on clients, for trading products that maximized Goldman Sachs' profits, not their clients, and trading illiquid, opaque products. Smith's op-ed was criticized by many, particularly because he worked at Goldman for 12 years before deciding to quit because of moral objections.

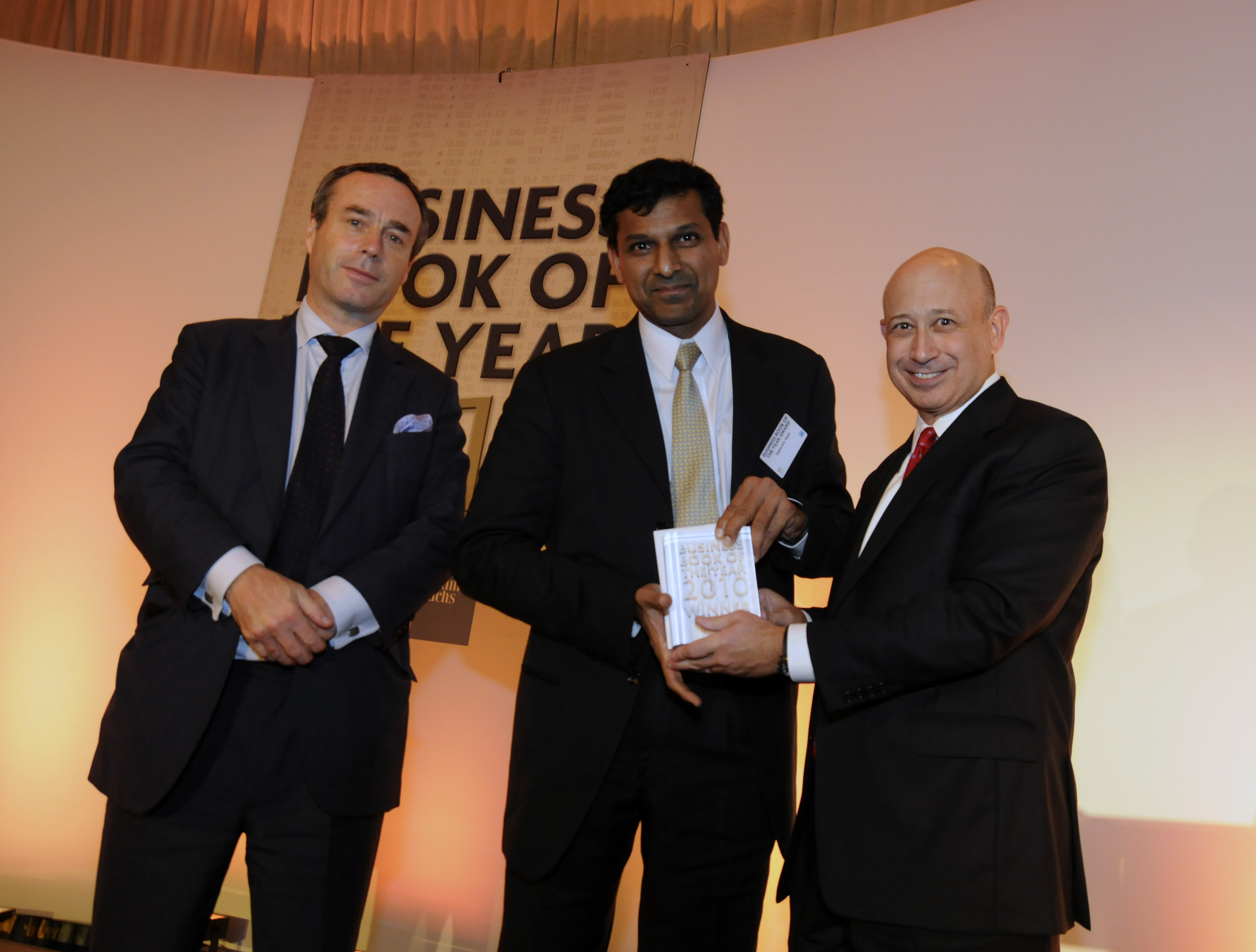
Blankfein, with Lionel Barber and Raghuram Rajan, at the FT and Goldman Sachs Business Book of the Year Award ceremony in 2010.

In February 2018, to counter low sales and trading profits, Blankfein instituted new hiring priorities. He instructed human resource managers at the firm to focus on employment candidates who were "strategists" or "strats," i.e., highly quantitative and technologically proficient.

On March 15, 2018, Blankfein issued an internal memo advocating for complete gender parity among its workforce. He stated: "At Goldman Sachs we pay women and men in similar roles with similar performance equally. However, the real issue for our firm and many corporations is the under-representation of women and diverse professionals both in magnitude and levels of seniority. We have made some progress, but we have significant work to do, and we, as leaders of our firm, are committed to doing this critical work."

=== Compensation ===
Blankfein's compensation at Goldman Sachs has been at the center of controversy and interest to financial reporters and the general public. He was paid a base salary of $600,000 with a total compensation package of $54.4 million in 2006 as the highest-paid executive on Wall Street. His bonus reflected the performance of Goldman Sachs, which reported record net earnings of $9.5 billion. The compensation included a cash bonus of $27.3 million, with the rest paid in stock and options. A year later, he received total compensation of $53.9 million, which included a base salary of $600,000, a cash bonus of $26.9 million, stocks granted of $15.5 million and options granted of $10.4 million. On April 7, 2009, he recommended guidelines to overhaul executive compensation. According to The New York Times, he said that lessons from the 2008 financial crisis included the need to "apply basic standards to how we compensate people in our industry". He received US$23 million in salary and bonuses in 2015, which was slightly down from the US$24 million he earned in 2014 from Goldman Sachs. According to the Financial Times, Blankfein earned an estimated $22.3 million in 2016.

=== Succession ===
On March 9, 2018, The Wall Street Journal reported that Blankfein would step down from leading Goldman Sachs by the end of the year. Later that day, Blankfein tweeted "It's the @WSJ's announcement...not mine. I feel like Huck Finn listening to his own eulogy." On March 12, Goldman announced that Harvey Schwartz, the company's co-chief operating officer and president would be resigning, leaving David Solomon as the second-in-command. Hours after the announcement, media outlets–both domestic and international–informally designated Solomon as Blankfein's heir apparent. It was announced in July 2018 that Solomon would become CEO on October 1, 2018 and chairman by the end of 2018.

== Political positions ==
Blankfein has self-identified as "a registered Democrat, and a Rockefeller Republican ... conservative on fiscal issues and more liberal on social issues". Blankfein donated $4,600 to Democratic Party candidate Hillary Clinton in 2007, and to the Senate re-election campaigns for the Republicans Rob Portman and Roy Blunt in 2015. On July 18, 2012 after meeting with Barack Obama's chief of staff, Jack Lew, he was asked whether he had any aspiration to go into government like predecessors Hank Paulson and Robert Rubin. "I have aspirations to be desired," he replied.

During the 2016 presidential election, presidential candidate Bernie Sanders named Blankfein as an example of corporate greed in January 2016. Blankfein responded that Sanders' campaign had "the potential to be a dangerous moment." Blankfein endorsed Democratic candidate Hillary Clinton, citing her willingness to be bipartisan, in the run-up for the 2016 U.S. presidential election.

=== Social issues ===
He is a supporter of gay marriage and has been a spokesman for the Human Rights Campaign, an advocacy group for LGBTQ civil rights.

In April 2022, Blankfein argued that revoking Disney's special status, enshrined in the Reedy Creek Improvement Act, due to the company objecting to Governor Ron DeSantis' view on Florida House Bill 1557 represents a form of government retaliation for "exercising free speech." He also said it is a "bad look for a conservative."

=== British libor rates ===
At the start of 2012, an international inquiry into the average of interest rates of London known as the London Interbank Offered Rate (Libor), found that there was systemic manipulation by various bulge bracket banks for profit. The ensuing July 2012 Libor scandal prompted Blankfein to note that the general distrust of the financial world was worsened: "There was this huge hole to dig out of in terms of getting trust back and now it's just that much deeper."

=== Environment ===
On June 1, 2017, Blankfein posted his first ever tweet, despite joining Twitter in 2011. He condemned President Donald Trump's withdrawal from the Paris Accord, saying "Today's decision is a setback for the environment and for the U.S.'s leadership position in the world. #ParisAgreement".

=== Coronavirus pandemic ===
During the coronavirus pandemic, Blankfein consistently and repeatedly called for loosening coronavirus response measures and reopening the economy. In March 2020, he said “extreme measures to flatten the virus ‘curve’” were sensible “for a time” but that they could crush the economy. He said, “Within a very few weeks let those with a lower risk to the disease return to work.” In May 2020, amid reopenings of the economy, Blankfein said that the U.S. would have to suffer through a spike in coronavirus cases because the U.S. could not provide additional coronavirus-related stimulus. At the time, he wrote, "Is the public health benefit from broad lockdowns at this point worth such extreme damage to livelihoods?" CBS News described Blankfein as "a leading spokesperson" for the "reopen the economy" movement.

=== Wealth tax ===
Blankfein opposes a wealth tax on billionaires. In 2019, while criticizing Elizabeth Warren's wealth tax, he alluded to her claimed Native American heritage, saying "Maybe tribalism is just in her DNA." Under her wealth tax proposal, Blankfein would have owed more than $30 million per year in taxes on his estimated $1.1 billion wealth.

Blankfein who earned $24 million from Goldman Sachs in 2018 criticized the notion that CEOs are overpaid. In 2019, he said he felt a "lack of appreciation" in society for Wall Streeters.

DEI initiatives

In 2026, Blankfein said DEI programs which were previously employed at Goldman Sachs were "counterproductive".

== Philanthropy ==
From 2000 to 2009, Blankfein personally donated $11 million (4.58% of his total compensation) to charitable organizations. His joint charity foundation, the Lloyd and Laura Blankfein Foundation, donated $620,000 to Harvard Law School, $500,000 to the Ethical Culture Fieldston School, $50,000 to Barnard College, $46,500 to the Robin Hood Foundation, and $10,000 to Carnegie Hall in fiscal year 2010.

Blankfein formerly served on the board of directors of the Partnership for New York City and currently serves on the board of overseers of the Weill Cornell Medical College.

== Personal life ==
Blankfein is married to Laura Jacobs, an attorney and the daughter of Norman S. Jacobs, the editor-in-chief of the Foreign Policy Association publications. The couple has two sons and a daughter.

On September 22, 2015, Blankfein was diagnosed with a form of lymphoma. He received multiple rounds of treatment of chemotherapy and by October 2016 was in remission.

== See also ==
- List of employees of Goldman Sachs
- List of Harvard University people

Business positions
New title	Senior Chairman of Goldman Sachs; 2019–present	Incumbent
Preceded by Henry Paulson	Chairman of Goldman Sachs; 2006–2018	Succeeded by David M. Solomon
Preceded by Henry Paulson	CEO of Goldman Sachs; 2006–2018	Succeeded by David M. Solomon
