= Diethart Breipohl =

German banker (born 1939)

- Born: August 23, 1939 (age 85); Königsberg, East Prussia, Germany
- Education: University of Hamburg; University of Münster; University of Tübingen (Doctor of Law)
- Occupation: Banker
- Years active: 1970–2008
- Employer: Allianz (1970–1999)
- Title: Former Chief Financial Officer, Allianz
- Board member of: Allianz (Supervisory Board, 2000–2002), Atos Origin (until 2008)

Diethart Breipohl (born 23 August 1939) is a German banker.

== Early life and education ==
Breipohl was born on 23 August 1939 in Königsberg.

Breipohl studied Business Administration and Law at the Universities of Hamburg, Münster and Tübingen, and is a Doctor of Law. He completed a bank apprenticeship at Bankhaus Hermann Lampe KG. He also took the "1st and 2nd state examination in law".

== Career ==
After completing his studies, he worked at Compagnie du Soleil, a French insurance company, as well as for the private bank Varin-Bernier.

Since 1970, he served as a Member of the Management Board of Allianz Lebensversicherungs-AG, Stuttgart. Since 1985, he served as Deputy Member of the Board of Management of Allianz Versicherungs-AG, Munich and is responsible for Asset Management since 1986. Since 1990 he was responsible for Human Resources of Allianz Versicherungs-AG, Munich. From 1991 to 1999, he was responsible for Group Finance as Member of the Board of Management of Allianz AG. He has been a Member of the Supervisory Board of Allianz AG (Munich) since 2000, and a Member of the Supervisory Board of Allianz AG (Germany), since April 17, 2002.

On 31 December 1999, Breipohl, then the board member responsible for finance at Allianz AG, retired at his own request. His area of responsibility was divided into two posts: one of "Finance" (a traditional chief financial officer position, held by Paul Achleitner), and one of "Asset Management and Other Financial Services" (which deals with third-party asset-management for private clients, held by Joachim Faber). He had been part of the financial department of Allianz AG from 1991 to 1999, and was the chief financial officer there as of 1999.

Breipohl has been a Director of a large number of European companies. As Head of Group Finance at Allianz, Breipohl was designated by Euromoney as "Europe's biggest investor". He is an International Advisor of Goldman Sachs.

On 29 June 2003, the Società Metallurgica Italiana announced that Breipohl was the new chairman of the supervisory board of KME AG (a German industrial company wholly owned by GIM-SMI, an Italian group).

At the end of the Annual General Meeting of Atos Origin on 12 June 2008 (an event held in Paris), Breipohl tendered his resignation, as in accordance with an agreement signed with Centaurus Capital and Pardus Capital Management on 28 May 2008. In June 2008, Breipohl resigned from the Supervisory Board of Atos Origin.

An organization named the "Dr. Diethart Breipohl Asset Club", named after him, was founded in Munich on 2 December 1999.

== Personal life ==
Breipohl is married.
