= Michael D. Fascitelli =

American businessman and investor (born c. 1957)

Michael D. Fascitelli (born c. 1957) is a billionaire American businessman. He is a member of the Vornado Realty Trust board of trustees and former CEO and president of the company before stepping down from day-to-day responsibilities on February 26, 2013. He is a co-owner of the Milwaukee Bucks as well as the Leeds United Football Club, and in 2017 founded a $500 million SPAC, Landscape Acquisitions, with Noam Gottesman where they are co-chairman. Since stepping back from day-to-day responsibilities at Vornado, Fascitelli has formed MDF Capital, a family-office investment firm, Landscape Acquisitions, a hospitality and real estate focused SPAC, and Imperial Companies.

== Education ==
Fascitelli is a member of the Class of 1978 of the University of Rhode Island where he received his B.S. in Industrial Engineering, Summa Cum Laude. He also received his MBA in 1982 with high distinction from the Harvard Business School. In May 2008, he received his Doctor of Laws from the University of Rhode Island.

== Career ==
After graduating from URI, Fascitelli joined the Bristol-Myers Squibb in 1978 as an engineer and manufacturing supervisor. Subsequent to graduating from Harvard Business School in 1982, Fascitelli joined McKinsey & Company, a management-consulting firm.

In 1985, he joined Goldman, Sachs & Co. in the Real Estate Department. He became partner in 1992 and was head of the real estate investment banking business. He also was on the Investment Committee for the Real Estate Funds. In December 1996, he became President of Vornado Realty Trust. He subsequently became Chief Executive Officer of Vornado in May 2009. During Fascitelli's 16-year tenure at Vornado (four as CEO), the company expanded and made several acquisitions, including buying Merchandise Mart building in Chicago and numerous office buildings surrounding Madison Square Garden in Manhattan. Under Fascitelli, Vornado also developed the Bloomberg L.P. headquarters in Manhattan. In 2012, Fascitelli was the 3rd highest paid CEO in the country earning $64.4 million.

Fascitelli also is the head of the investment committee for the real estate technology startup, Cadre, in which he was an angel investor. The company was founded by Jared and Josh Kushner, along with CEO Ryan Williams and has been backed by George Soros, Jack Ma, Peter Thiel and other high-profile investors.

Fascitelli is a Trustee and Director of the Urban Land Institute. He is past Chairman of the Wharton Real Estate Center and still os on the Executive Committee. He is on the board of the Child Mind Institute, The Rockefeller University Board of Trustees, the Port Authority of New York and New Jersey, Cadre, Harvard Business School, and St. Bernard's board of trustees. He is an officer and a member of the Executive Board for the National Association of Real Estate Investment Trusts. Fascitelli also is on the Real Estate Round Table Board of Directors. Additionally, he is on both the Harvard Business School Board of Overseers and the URI Foundation Board.

In 2015, Fascitelli was nominated by Governor Andrew Cuomo to serve a six-year term on the Board of Commissioners of the Port Authority of New York and New Jersey.

== Charitable work and political contributions ==
Fascitelli was the recipient of the 2012 Child Advocacy Award for his transformative philanthropic contributions to the cause of children's mental health and the establishment of the Child Mind Institute.

From the Greater New York Councils Boy Scouts of America he received the Good Scout Award and the James E. West Fellowship Award in 1997 and he received the Silver Beaver Award in 2003. Fascitelli was one of the recipients of CPE's Executive of the Year award in November 2012. He was also the recipient of the Best Present Award in January 2013. In 2008, he received the Business Statesman of the Year award from The Harvard Business School Club of New York.

Fascitelli is a large donor to Republican campaigns. In 2016, he fundraised and gave thousands to Donald Trump.

== Personal life ==
Fascitelli is married to Elizabeth Fascitelli (née Cogan), a partner at Goldman Sachs.

Fascitelli is a prominent wine collector who owns vineyards around the world. He was among the notable victims of wine fraud perpetrated by Rudy Kurniawan, a convicted wine counterfeiter. This incident highlighted the vulnerabilities even experienced collectors face in the high-end wine market. Fascitelli's experience brought attention to the broader issue of wine fraud, which has impacted numerous collectors and institutions worldwide.
