= Wilbur Luft =

American football player and coach (1908–1991)

Biographical details
- Born: June 1, 1908
- Died: December 20, 1991 (aged 83)

Playing career
- 1930–1932: Washington State
- Position: Quarterback

Coaching career (HC unless noted)
- 1933–1935: Sunnyside HS (WA)
- 1936–1947: Renton HS (WA)
- 1948–1949: Central Washington

Head coaching record
- Overall: 8–9–1 (college)

Wilbur "Shorty" Luft (June 1, 1908 – December 20, 1991) was an American football player and coach. He served as the head football coach at Central Washington University from 1948 to 1949, compiling a record of 8–9–1. Luft was a quarterback at Washington State University in the early 1930s and was named the starter for the 1931 Rose Bowl.

== Head coaching record ==
=== College ===
Year	Team	Overall	Conference	Standing	Bowl/playoffs
Central Washington Wildcats (Evergreen Conference) (1948–1949)
1948	Central Washington	5–3–1	2–3–1	T–4th	
1949	Central Washington	3–6	2–4	T–5th	
Central Washington:		8–9–1	4–7–1		
Total:		8–9–1			
