= Cadre (company) =

American financial technology company

RealCadre LLC
- Type: Subsidiary
- Industry: Financial technology Real estate
- Founded: 2014; 12 years ago in New York, New York, United States
- Founder: Ryan Williams
- Headquarters: New York City, New York, United States
- Key people: Ryan Williams, CEO, Founder & Executive Chairman Dan Rosenbloom, Chief Investment Officer Michael Fascitelli, Investment Committee Co-Chair
- Number of employees: Over 100
- Parent: Yieldstreet (2023–present)
- Website: cadre.com

RealCadre LLC, commonly Cadre, is an American financial technology company that provides individuals and institutions direct access to real estate investment properties, including commercial properties based in New York. The business and financial press describe it as a platform that "makes the real estate market more like the stock market" by allowing investors to select the individual transactions in which they participate, while investing a smaller amount than would be required to fully fund a transaction. For example, 12 institutional investors (such as family offices and endowments) participated in a $60 million office building purchase. The firm was named to Forbes' "FinTech50" for 7 years in a row starting in 2016. In 2019, Cadre was the cover story of the Forbes "FinTech 50" issue. In 2018, a partnership with Goldman Sachs was announced through which Goldman Sachs' private wealth clients committed at least $250 million (USD) real estate investments through Cadre. In 2020, Cadre announced its "Direct Access" fund intended to include smaller investors with a $400 million target raise. The company also offers a managed portfolio service and a real estate secondary market, as well as a cash holdings account called "Cadre Cash". The company has announced plans to address racial injustice in the United States by investing at least 10% of its Direct Access fund investments with minority-owned operators and increasing its cash held in black-owned banks.

In 2023, Cadre launched Cadre Direct Access Fund II, a value-add fund aiming to raise $500mm to invest in opportunistic assets resulting from the capital markets dislocation. Most of its investors in the fund were expected to be institutional in nature. In 2023, Cadre was acquired by Yieldstreet, a global alternative investment platform. Cadre CEO Ryan Williams continues to serve as the CEO of Cadre, which operates as an independent subsidiary. Prior to the acquisition, Cadre received venture capital investment from several sources.

== History ==
Founder and then-CEO Ryan Williams started the company with Thrive Capital and General Catalyst, which together invested $18 million in a 2015 fundraising round. Startup capital included a $250 million line of credit from the family of George Soros. That round also included a $250 million backstop liquidity commitment from an unnamed family office. Vornado CEO Michael Fascitelli also invested in this round and joined the board. Jared Kushner advised the firm for approximately 18 months.

Williams was named one of Forbes' "30 Under 30" for 2018. Former Vornado Realty Trust CEO Michael D. Fascitelli leads the investment committee. Other team members were hired from Silicon Valley firms, such as the former head of engineering from Mint.com.

In 2016, the firm raised another $50 million, which included Michael Fascitelli joining Cadre's investment committee. In 2017, it was named an "Inc. New York start-up to watch", to Equities.com's Pioneer 250, and to Fast Company's "5 FinTech startups to watch". The firm raised an additional $65 million in 2017 in a round led by Andreessen Horowitz. A 2018 deal permits private wealth clients of Goldman Sachs to invest through the Cadre platform.

In early 2018, it was reported that the company planned to expand to include residential real estate loans by investing in loans issued by others.

In 2018 the company announced the "Cadre Secondary Market," which permits users to sell positions after a one-year holding period. It also announced the "Cadre Managed Portfolio" service, which allows users to create a diversified account with a $250,000 minimum.

In late 2018, the company launched an opportunity zone fund based on tax changes established in the Tax Cuts and Jobs Act of 2017, which were designed to encourage investment in low-income areas. Investors who invest in qualified projects and meet holding-period requirements face reduced capital gains taxes and may defer other capital gains taxes.

In 2019, CEO Ryan Williams said that Cadre's ability to disrupt the industry was because "real estate is a Jurassic industry. It's antiquated." In late 2019 it was reported the Cadre had returned more than $100 million to investors.

In 2020, Cadre announced that it hired Allen Smith, former CEO of Four Seasons Hotels and Resorts, as president. Smith previously worked as the CEO of Prudential Real Estate Investors.

Also in 2020, CEO Ryan Williams announced plans for Cadre to increase its support for equality. The company made Juneteenth a company holiday and Williams, who shared his personal ancestry story including former enslaved persons, also published a plan to help increase economic opportunity for diverse communities through "formal mentorship programs to provide hands-on guidance, and ... comprehensive skills-training programs that help people of all ages get a start in careers that will allow them to succeed in a fast-changing economy."

In October 2020, Cadre added the "Cadre Cash" platform, allowing investors to earn a cash reward on qualifying cash balances held in the platform.

In early 2021, Cadre announced a new $400 million "Direct Access" fund targeting individual investors, financial institutions and wealth advisors, with a minimum investment of $50,000, which lowers the implied per-property allocation to $5,000 or less. The fund will permit investors to seek liquidity after a mandatory hold period through the company's secondary market, where investors can post interests in sale to potential buyers. Cadre also announced a plan for at least 10% of all investments through its Direct Access fund to be made with minority-owned operators, and at least 5% of cash to be held in black-owned banks.

In 2022, Jared Kaplan was hired as CEO; founder Ryan Williams became Executive Chairman and Co-Chairman of Cadre's Global Investment Committee. Kaplan is the former CEO of OppFi and the founder of Insureon.

Since this time, Ryan Williams has returned to the CEO role and led the launch of multiple new investment products, including Cadre Direct Access Fund II.

=== Yieldstreet merger ===
In late 2023, Cadre closed a merger with Yieldstreet, a company that provides a platform for global alternative investments. Both companies will continue to operate as separate divisions, with Ryan Williams continuing to helm Cadre.

Fortune Magazine described the merger as creating conditions for a future IPO. At the time of the merger, Cadre and Yieldstreet together had produced more than $3.1 billion in returns for clients, based on a total investment value of $9.7 billion across 500,000 clients. Williams stated, "Together with Yieldstreet, we look forward to helping expand institutional distribution and broadening its offering of institutional-caliber products and innovative solutions that reduce friction for investors in private markets."

== Platform ==
Traditional real estate investment funds vest all decision-making with a paid manager; individual participants have no ability to select transactions in which to participate. By contrast, Cadre permits investors to choose what investments to make on a building or project level. Cadre curates investment opportunities, and uses an electronic platform to make these qualified opportunities available to investors. Individual investors can then buy a stake in any project. The company performs diligence using its data analysis software and data analysis team. For sellers, the company claims higher speed and lower fees as advantages. CEO Williams claims that real estate "builds multi-generational wealth", and, "Cadre provides access to more members of the global economy with the opportunity to build wealth". Secondary sales and managed portfolios are also supported. In the future, the firm intends to use its data analytics platform to allow investment in opaque, illiquid asset classes beyond real estate (such as "energy, natural resources, oil, infrastructure, or anything that's historically been privately held or inaccessible"). The platform also offers a cash reward on qualifying balances in the "Cadre Cash" program.
