= Jim Wilkinson (communications) =

American political advisor

- Born: 1970 (age 55–56); Tenaha, Texas, U.S.
- Education: University of Texas at Arlington (BBA); Johns Hopkins University (MS)

Jim Wilkinson (born 1970) is an American political advisor who served as the chief of staff to Treasury Secretary Hank Paulson during the George W. Bush administration. He had previously served in the White House as deputy communications director and as an aide to then National Security Advisor Condoleezza Rice. Overall, Wilkinson was a "well-traveled utility man for the Bush administration's PR team".

In 2011, he was portrayed in the HBO film Too Big to Fail by actor Topher Grace.

Wilkinson works as chairman and CEO of TrailRunner International, as well as the chairman of Mountain Lion Aviation, an airline based in Sierra Nevada region. He was previously the senior vice president and head of international corporate affairs for the Alibaba Group.

== Early life and education ==
Wilkinson was born in 1970 and grew up in Tenaha, Texas. He initially planned to be an undertaker. Wilkinson received his BBA in finance from University of Texas at Arlington in 1993 and his Master of Science in government from Johns Hopkins University.

== Career ==
Wilkinson began his career on the staff of Republican Congressman Dick Armey, serving from 1992 to 2000. He then worked as the spokesman for the National Republican Congressional Committee.

In 1999, during George W. Bush's campaign for president, Wilkinson helped sell the idea that Al Gore claimed to have "invented the Internet".

In 2000, Wilkinson traveled to Florida to support Republican activists during the recount. Wilkinson joined the Bush administration and worked as "White House deputy director of communications and spokesman for Defense Secretary Donald Rumsfeld's transition team".

Wilkinson served as an officer in the United States Navy Reserves. His mentors have included former R.N.C. chairman Ed Gillespie and former G.W. Bush adviser Karen Hughes. As Karl Rove's choice, Wilkinson left the Bush administration to work as the communications director for the 2004 Republican National Convention before returning to the White House under Rice.

Wilkinson likes to stay behind the scenes. When asked personal questions by The New York Observer Wilkinson declined answering, saying "Staff should be seen and not heard. And biographical pieces amount to nothing more than climbing out on the seat of a dunking booth and handing out baseballs all over town." Wilkinson, who has run marathons, has been described as hyperactive and media-savvy.

As of 2010, Wilkinson was working as Managing Partner of Brunswick Group LLP, a public relations firm.

Jim Wilkinson was listed on PRWeek's list of the most powerful 50 communicators in the world.

He played a role in Alibaba's IPO.

=== Bush administration ===
Wilkinson was head of the "war room", or Coalition Information Center for the Afghanistan War. He highlighted efforts to improve living conditions for Afghan women. In public relations preparations for 2003 invasion of Iraq, Wilkinson was part of the White House Iraq Group under Karl Rove and Scooter Libby. The goal of the group was to "get the country on the page that the White House wanted everybody to believe: that Iraq, with its weapons of mass destruction, was an imminent threat to the United States".

For the Iraq war, Wilkinson was the chief spokesman for Gen. Tommy Franks under CENTCOM in Doha. Many reporters were unhappy in Doha, and the atmosphere was tense; Ben Smith of The New York Observer mentioned three theories on the source of the tension: that stationed reporters were jealous of their embedded colleagues, that Wilkinson helped execute an operation that controlled the information well, or that Wilkinson was inept. Ron Suskind, writing in The Washington Post, called Wilkinson the "spinmeister for the Iraq war". When Wilkinson faced questions from reporters he found lacking in support for the Iraq War, he would rebuke them.

=== Jessica Lynch ===
In original editions of the book Where Men Win Glory: The Odyssey of Pat Tillman, Wilkinson was described as a "master propagandist". The book stated that Wilkinson concocted details regarding the Jessica Lynch story and "arranged to give The Washington Post exclusive access to classified intelligence that was the basis for the now-discredited 'She Was Fighting to the Death' story that ran on the front page of the newspaper" on 3 April 2003. When interviewed by the United States House Committee on Oversight and Government Reform, Wilkinson said that he did not know the identity of the "U.S. officials" cited in the 3 April story. Wilkinson could not explain why erroneous news reports emerged about Private Lynch's capture and rescue.

The congressional report, titled Misleading Information from the Battlefield: The Tillman and Lynch Episodes states that, "As the Committee investigated the Tillman and Lynch cases, it encountered a striking lack of recollection. In Private Lynch's case, Jim Wilkinson...told the Committee he did not know where the false information originated or who disseminated it."

During media coverage of Lynch, Wilkinson said, "America does not leave its heroes behind". Tommy Franks, in his book American Soldier, writes that Wilkinson was too eager to pass along the night-vision video of Lynch to the media.

=== National Security Council and State Department ===
Wilkinson was the spokesman for the United States National Security Council. In an op-ed titled "Smear Without Fear", Paul Krugman of The New York Times attributed to Wilkinson a smear on Richard Clarke broadcast on CNN, writing that,

"Wilkinson seems to have questioned Mr. Clarke's sanity, saying: 'He sits back and visualizes chanting by bin Laden, and bin Laden has a mystical mind control over U.S. officials. This is sort of "X-Files" stuff.' Really? On Page 246 of "Against All Enemies," Mr. Clarke bemoans the way the invasion of Iraq, in his view, played right into the hands of Al Qaeda: 'Bush handed that enemy precisely what it wanted and needed.. .. It was as if Usama bin Laden, hidden in some high mountain redoubt, were engaging in long-range mind control of George Bush.' That's not '"X-Files" stuff': it's a literary device, meant to emphasize just how ill-conceived our policy is. Mr. Blitzer should be telling Mr. Wilkinson to apologize."

As a senior aide to then Secretary of State Condoleezza Rice, Wilkinson was credited with an image-making strategy that elevated Rice to "rock star status". Wilkinson employed specific strategies to counter notions Rice was cold and did not care about diplomacy. While Chief of Staff in the U.S. Treasury department, Wilkinson worked under Henry Paulson. A Wilkinson September 2008 email regarding the government's approach to Lehman Brothers appeared in a 2010 Financial Crisis Inquiry Commission document. Wilkinson emailed "can't stomach us bailing out lehman. Will be horrible in the press." Wilkinson declined to comment on his emails.

== In other media ==
Wilkinson was portrayed in the 23 May 2011 HBO film Too Big to Fail by actor Topher Grace.

== Bibliography ==
- Krakauer, Jon (2009). Where Men Win Glory: The Odyssey of Pat Tillman. Doubleday. p. 349. ISBN 978-0-385-52226-7.
- Massing, Michael (2004). Now they tell us: the American press and Iraq. New York, NY: The New York Review of Books. p. 7. ISBN 1-59017-129-2. "Jim Wilkinson."
- Committee Website on Investigation Misleading Information from the Battlefield: The Tillman and Lynch Episodes United States House of Representatives Committee on Oversight and Government Reform.
