= Paul Luft =

German scholar of Islam

- Born: 1934 (age 91–92)
- Scientific career
- Fields: Islamic Studies
- Workplaces: Durham University

J. Paul Luft (born 1934) is a German Islamic studies scholar and Emeritus Professor at Durham University where he is Honorary Research Fellow in the School of Government and International Affairs and Honorary Lecturer in the Institute for Middle Eastern and Islamic Studies. From 1977 to 1980, he was a fellow of the German Historical Institute. He taught Middle Eastern Studies and Persian History and Literature at the University of Manchester and also taught at the Oriental School, Durham University. He retired in 1999.

== Works ==
- Luft, J. P. & Turner, Colin. (2008). Shi'ism: Critical Concepts in Islamic Studies. London: Routledge
- Luft, J. P. (2000). Die Islamische Revolution 1979. In Grosse Revolution der Geschicte. Wende, Peter (ed.). München: C. H. Beck
- Luft, J. P. (1994). Gottesstaat und hoefische Gesellschaft. In Asien in der Neuzeit, 1500-1950. Dabringhaus, Sabine; Freitag, Ulrike & Air, Paul Frankfurt (eds.)
- Luft, J. P. (1986). The Persian Railway Syndicate and British Railway Policy in Iran. In The Gulf in the Early 20th Century. Lawless, R. I. (ed.)
