= Klaus Luft =

German executive and entrepreneur (born 1941)

- Born: October 22, 1941 (age 84); Karlsruhe, Germany
- Occupations: Entrepreneur, business executive
- Known for: Former CEO of Nixdorf Computer and founder of Artedona
- Children: 2

Klaus Siegfried Luft (born October 22, 1941) is a German business executive and entrepreneur. He is the founder and chairman of the Supervisory Board of Artedona and also known for being a board member of a number of major technology companies.

== Career ==
From March 1986 to November 1989, Klaus Luft was Chief Executive Officer of Nixdorf Computer AG, where he served for more than 17 years in a variety of executive positions in marketing, manufacturing, and finance. He served as Board Member of Dell Inc. from March 1995 through October 2013.

In 1999, Klaus Luft founded Artedona, an exclusive mail order e-commerce company, offering tableware and home décor products of well-known luxury brands. He also became the owner and President of Munich-based MATCH — Market Access Services GmbH & Co. KG.

From 1990 until 2010, Luft served as Vice Chairman and International Advisor to Goldman Sachs Europe Limited. Luft is the Honorary Consul of the Republic of Estonia in the State of Bavaria.

== Philanthropy ==
In March 2000, Klaus Luft established the Klaus Luft Foundation, which focuses on supporting young students’ causes in education, performing arts, and science, as well as partly contributing to other foundations with the same mission in Germany, India, Venezuela, and the United States.
