= Henry Paulson =

American investment banker and financier (born 1946)

Hank Paulson
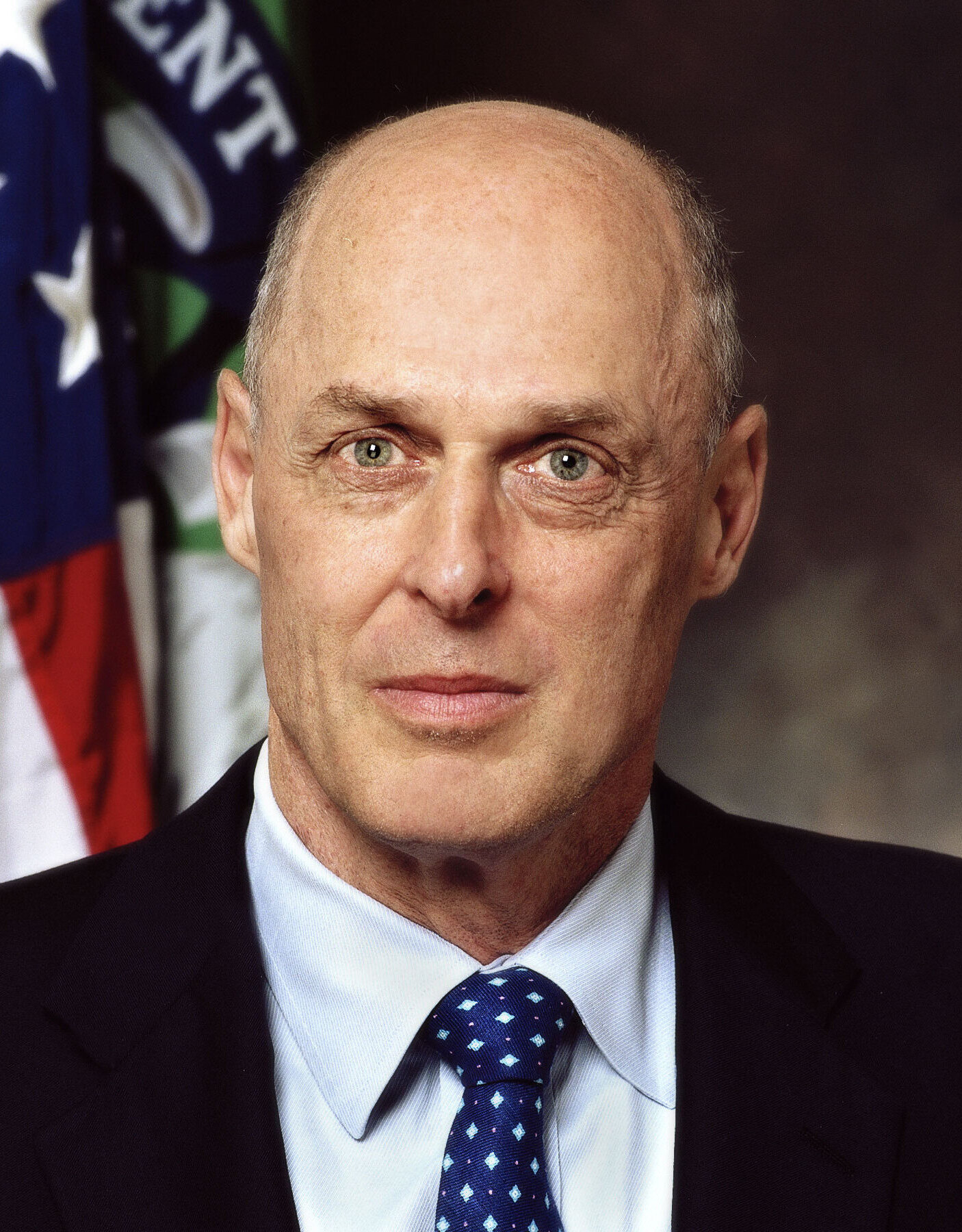
- Official portrait, 2006

74th United States Secretary of the Treasury
- In office July 10, 2006 – January 20, 2009
- President: George W. Bush
- Deputy: Robert M. Kimmitt
- Preceded by: John W. Snow
- Succeeded by: Timothy Geithner

Personal details
- Born: Henry Merritt Paulson Jr. March 28, 1946 (age 80) Palm Beach, Florida, U.S.
- Party: Republican
- Spouse: Wendy Judge
- Children: 2, including Merritt
- Education: Dartmouth College (BA); Harvard University (MBA)
- Paulson's voice Paulson announcing the Troubled Asset Relief Program; Recorded September 19, 2008

Henry Merritt "Hank" Paulson Jr. (born March 28, 1946) is an American investment banker and financier who served as the 74th United States secretary of the treasury from 2006 to 2009. Prior to his role in the Department of the Treasury, Paulson was the chairman and chief executive officer (CEO) of major investment bank Goldman Sachs.

He served as Secretary of the Treasury under President George W. Bush. Paulson served through the end of the Bush administration, leaving office on January 20, 2009. He is now the chairman of the Paulson Institute, which he founded in 2011 to promote sustainable economic growth and a cleaner environment around the world, with an initial focus on the United States and China. He also works as executive chairman of the global fund, TPG Rise Climate.

== Early life and education ==
Paulson was born in Palm Beach, Florida, the son of Marianne (née Gallauer) and Henry Merritt Paulson, a wholesale jeweler. He was raised as a Christian Scientist on a farm in Barrington, Illinois. He has Norwegian, German, and English Canadian ancestry. Paulson attained the rank of Eagle Scout in the Boy Scouts of America and is a recipient of the Distinguished Eagle Scout Award.

Paulson was an athlete at Barrington High School, participating in wrestling and football. He graduated in 1964. Paulson went on to attend Dartmouth College, where he graduated Phi Beta Kappa in 1968 with a degree in English. At Dartmouth, he was a member of Sigma Alpha Epsilon and he was an All-Ivy, All-East, and honorable mention All-American as an offensive lineman. Paulson received his Master of Business Administration degree from Harvard Business School in 1970. He was offered a scholarship to study at the University of Oxford following his graduation from Dartmouth, but chose not to accept it.

== Early career ==
Paulson was Staff Assistant to the Assistant Secretary of Defense at the Pentagon from 1970 to 1972. He then worked for the administration of U.S. president Richard Nixon, serving as assistant to John Ehrlichman from 1972 to 1973.

== Goldman Sachs ==
Paulson joined Goldman Sachs in 1974, working in the firm's Chicago office under James P. Gorter, covering large industrial companies in the Midwest. He became a partner in 1982. From 1983 until 1988, Paulson led the Investment Banking group for the Midwest Region, and became managing partner of the Chicago office in 1988. From 1990 to November 1994, he was co-head of Investment Banking, then Chief Operating Officer from December 1994 to June 1998, eventually succeeding Jon Corzine as chief executive. His compensation package, according to reports, was $37 million in 2005, and $16.4 million projected for 2006. His net worth has been estimated at over $700 million. Paulson earned an estimated $480 million in total compensation from Goldman Sachs.

Paulson has personally built close relations with China during his career. In July 2008, The Daily Telegraph reported "Treasury Secretary Hank Paulson has intimate relations with the Chinese elite, dating from his days at Goldman Sachs when he visited the country more than 70 times."

Before becoming Treasury Secretary, he was required to liquidate all of his stock holdings in Goldman Sachs, valued at over $600 million in 2006, in order to comply with conflict-of-interest regulations. Due to a tax provision passed under President George H. W. Bush, Paulson was able to defer his capital gains tax, saving himself an estimated $50 million.

== U.S. Secretary of the Treasury ==
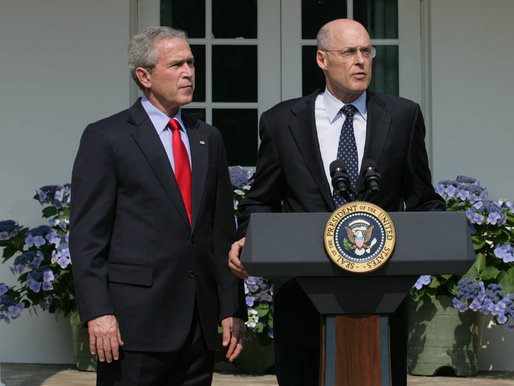
Paulson (right) with President George W. Bush as his nomination to become Treasury Secretary is announced

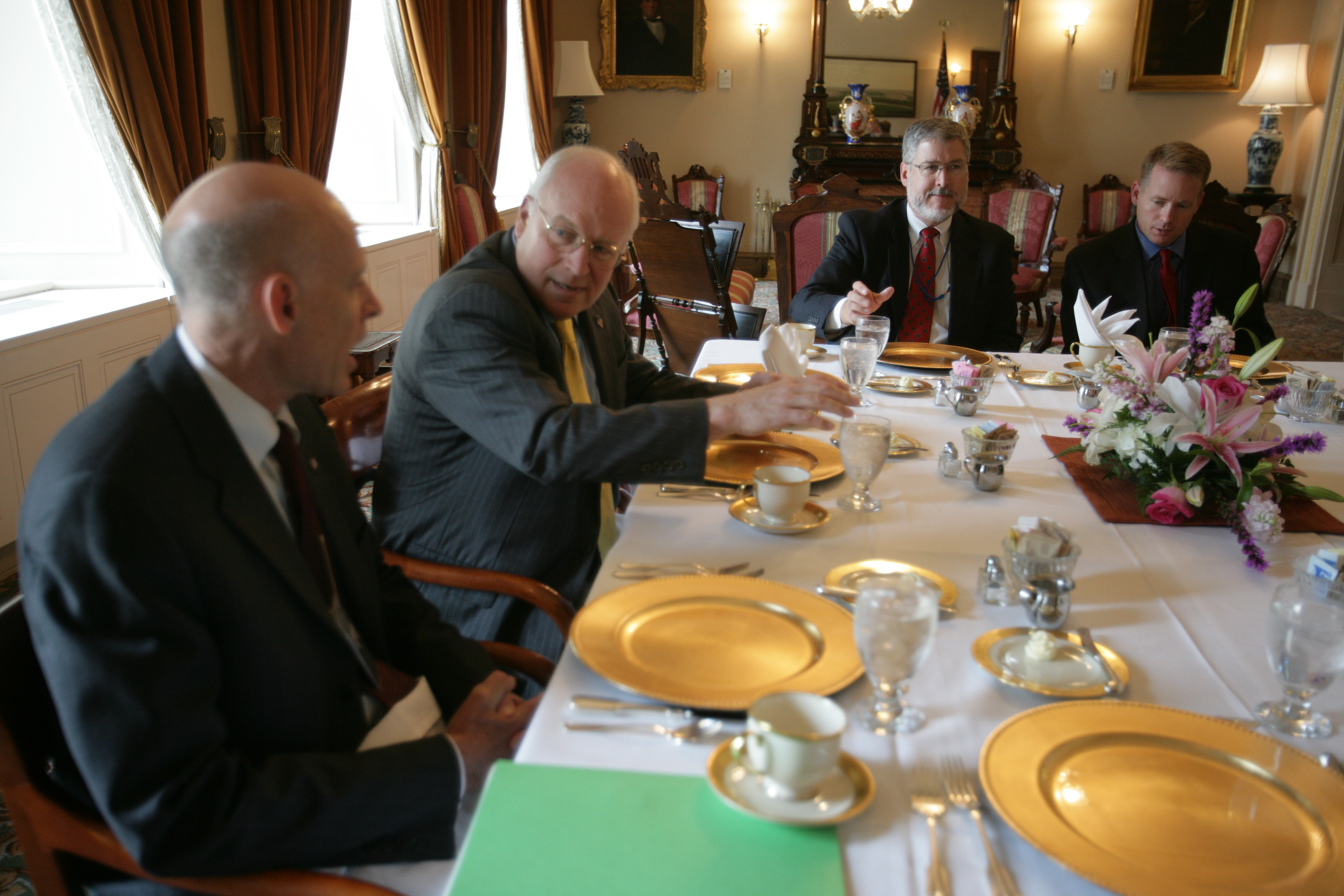
Paulson with Dick Cheney, July 12, 2006

Paulson was nominated on May 30, 2006, by U.S. president George W. Bush to succeed John Snow as the Treasury Secretary. On June 28, 2006, he was confirmed unanimously by the United States Senate to serve in the position. Paulson was sworn in at a ceremony held at the Treasury Department on the morning of July 10, 2006.

Paulson identified the wide gap between the richest and poorest Americans as an issue on his list of the country's four major long-term economic issues to be addressed, highlighting the issue in one of his first public appearances as Secretary of Treasury.

Paulson conceded that chances were slim for agreeing on a method to reform Social Security financing, but said he would keep trying to find bipartisan support for it.

He also helped to create the Hope Now Alliance to help struggling homeowners during the subprime mortgage crisis.

Paulson was known to have persuaded President George W. Bush to allow him to spearhead U.S.–China relations and initiated and led the U.S.–China Strategic Economic Dialogue, a forum and mechanism under which the two countries addressed global areas of immediate and long-term strategic and economic interest. In spring 2007, Paulson warned an audience at the Shanghai Futures Exchange that China needed to free up capital markets to avoid losing potential economic growth, saying: "An open, competitive, and liberalized financial market can effectively allocate scarce resources in a manner that promotes stability and prosperity far better than governmental intervention." In September 2008, in light of the economic crisis experienced by the U.S. in the interim, Chinese leaders evidenced hesitation to follow Paulson's advice. When the U.S. needed to issue a huge volume of bonds to stabilize the financial market, it relied on China, the top holder of US debt.

=== Notable statements ===
In April 2007, he delivered an upbeat assessment of the economy, saying growth was healthy and the housing market was nearing a turnaround. "All the signs I look at" show "the housing market is at or near the bottom," Paulson said in a speech to a business group in New York. The U.S. economy is "very healthy" and "robust," Paulson said.

In August 2007, Secretary Paulson explained that U.S. subprime mortgage fallout remained largely contained due to the strongest global economy in decades.

On March 26, 2008, Secretary Paulson said in remarks at the U.S. Chamber of Commerce,

As we work our way through this turbulence, our highest priority is limiting its impact on the real economy. We must maintain stable, orderly and liquid financial markets and our banks must continue to play their vital role of supporting the economy by making credit available to consumers and businesses. And we must of course focus on housing, which precipitated the turmoil in the capital markets, and is today the biggest downside risk to our economy. We must work to limit the impact of the housing downturn on the real economy without impeding the completion of the necessary housing correction. I will address each of these in turn. Regulators and policy makers are vigilant; we are not taking anything for granted.

In May 2008, The Wall Street Journal wrote that Paulson said U.S. financial markets are emerging from the credit crunch that many economists believe has pushed the country to the brink of recession. "I do believe that the worst is likely to be behind us," Paulson told the newspaper in an interview.

On July 20, 2008, after the failure of Indymac Bank, Paulson reassured the public by saying, "it's a safe banking system, a sound banking system. Our regulators are on top of it. This is a very manageable situation."

On August 10, 2008, Secretary Paulson told NBC's Meet the Press that he had no plans to inject any capital into Fannie Mae or Freddie Mac. On September 7, 2008, both Fannie Mae and Freddie Mac went into conservatorship.

On November 18, in testimony before the United States House Committee on Financial Services, Secretary Paulson told lawmakers,

There is no playbook for responding to turmoil we have never faced. We adjusted our strategy to reflect the facts of a severe market crisis always keeping focused on Congress's goal and our goal – to stabilize the financial system that is integral to the everyday lives of all Americans.

On November 20, 2008, during remarks at the Ronald Reagan Presidential Library, Secretary Paulson said,

We are working through a severe financial crisis caused by many factors, including government inaction and mistaken actions, outdated U.S. and global financial regulatory systems, and by the excessive risk-taking of financial institutions. This combination of factors led to a critical stage this fall when the entire U.S. financial system was at risk. This should never happen again. The United States must lead global financial reform efforts, and we must start by getting our own house in order.

== 2008 financial crisis ==
=== "Blueprint for a Modernized Financial Regulatory Structure" ===
On March 31, 2008, Paulson released "The Department of the Treasury Blueprint for a Modernized Financial Regulatory Structure". In remarks announcing the release of the report, Paulson cited the need to overhaul the financial regulatory system, saying:

But capital markets and the financial services industry have evolved significantly over the past decade. Globalization and financial innovation, such as securitization, have provided benefits to domestic and global economic growth; while highlighting new risks to financial markets. We should and can have a structure that is designed for the world we live in, one that is more flexible, one that can better adapt to change, one that will allow us to more effectively deal with inevitable market disruptions and one that will better protect investors and consumers.

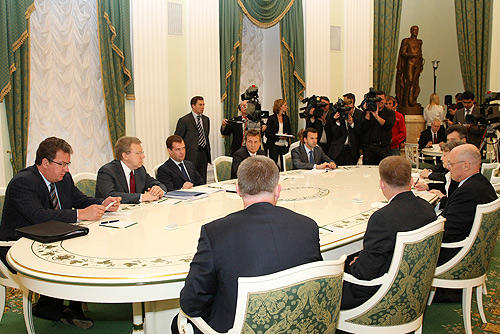
Paulson with Russian President Dmitry Medvedev, June 30, 2008

=== Lehman's bankruptcy ===
The support given by the Federal Reserve Board, under Ben Bernanke, and the U.S. Treasury with Paulson at the helm, in the acquisition of Bear Stearns by JPMorgan Chase and the $200 billion facility made available to Fannie Mae and Freddie Mac attracted a great deal of criticism in congress by both Republicans and Democrats. Paulson and Geithner made every effort to enable Barclays to acquire Lehman Brothers, including convincing other large Wall Street firms to commit their own funds to support the deal. In light of the recent Bear Stearns criticism, Paulson was against committing public funds towards a bailout, for fear of being labelled “Mr. Bailout”. When British regulators indicated they would not approve the purchase, Lehman went into bankruptcy, and Paulson and Geithner worked to contain the systemic impact.

"Well, as you know, we're working through a difficult period in our financial markets right now as we work off some of the past excesses. But the American people can remain confident in the soundness and the resilience of our financial system," Paulson said soon after the Lehman Brothers bankruptcy.

In the aftermath of Lehman's failure and the simultaneous purchase of Merrill Lynch by Bank of America, already fragile credit markets froze, so that companies that had nothing to do with banking but needed financing (e.g. General Electric) could not get daily funding requirements which had the effect of sending the U.S. equity and bond markets into turmoil between September 15 and 19, 2008.

=== U.S. government economic bailout of 2008 ===
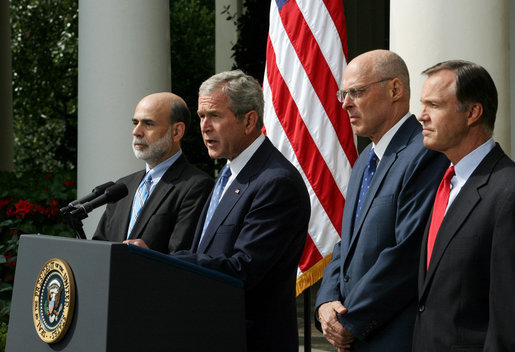
Paulson, Ben Bernanke and Christopher Cox in September 2008 as President Bush speaks about the economy

Through unprecedented intervention by the U.S. Treasury, Paulson led government efforts which he said were aimed at avoiding a severe economic slowdown. After the Dow Jones dropped 30% and turmoil ensued in the global markets, Paulson pushed through legislation authorizing the Treasury to use $700 billion to stabilize the financial system. Working with Federal Reserve Chairman Ben Bernanke, he influenced the decision to create a credit facility (bridge loan and warrants) of $85 billion to American International Group so it would avoid filing bankruptcy, after having been told that AIG held teacher pension plans, 401k plans, $1.5 trillion in life insurance plans for Americans, and the French Finance Minister called to let Paulson know that AIG held the interests of many Eurozone countries.

On September 19, 2008, Paulson called for the U.S. government to use hundreds of billions of Treasury dollars to help financial firms clean up nonperforming mortgages threatening the liquidity of those firms. Because of his leadership and public appearances on this issue, the press labeled these measures the "Paulson financial rescue plan" or simply the Paulson Plan.

With the passage of H.R. 1424, Paulson became the manager of the United States Emergency Economic Stabilization fund.

As Treasury Secretary, he also was a member of the newly established Financial Stability Oversight Board that oversaw the Troubled Assets Relief Program.

Paulson agreed with Bernanke that the only way to unlock the frozen capital markets was to provide direct injections into financial institutions so investors would have confidence in these institutions. The government would take a non-voting share position, with 5% dividends for the first year on the money lent to the banks and 9% thereafter until the banks stabilized and could repay the government loans. According to the book Too Big To Fail, Paulson, Bernanke, New York Federal Reserve Chairman Timothy Geithner, and FDIC Chairman Sheila Bair attended the meeting on October 13, 2008, at which this plan was presented to the CEOs of nine major banks.

==== Time magazine on Henry Paulson ====
Time named Paulson as a runner-up for its 2008 Person of the Year, saying, with reference to the 2008 financial crisis, "if there is a face to this financial debacle, it is now his ..." before concluding that "given the ... realities he faced, there is no obviously better path [he] could have followed".

==== Conflict of interest claims ====
It has been pointed out that Paulson's plan could potentially have some conflicts of interest, since Paulson was a former CEO of Goldman Sachs, a firm that might benefit largely from the plan. Economic columnists called for more scrutiny of his actions. Questions remain about Paulson's interest, despite having no direct financial interest in Goldman, since he had sold his entire stake in the firm prior to becoming Treasury Secretary, pursuant to ethics law. The Goldman Sachs benefit from the AIG bailout was recently estimated as $12.9 billion and GS was the largest recipient of the public funds from AIG. Creating the collateralized debt obligations (CDOs) forming the basis of the current crisis was an active part of Goldman Sach's business during Paulson's tenure as CEO. Opponents argued that Paulson remained a Wall Street insider who maintained close friendships with higher-ups of the bailout beneficiaries. Some time after the passage of a rewritten bill, the press reported that the Treasury was now proposing to use these funds ($700 billion) in ways other than what was originally intended in the bill.

== Career after public service ==
After leaving his role as Treasury Secretary, Paulson spent a year at the Paul H. Nitze School of Advanced International Studies at Johns Hopkins University as a distinguished visiting fellow, and a fellow at the university's Bernard Schwartz Forum on Constructive Capitalism. His memoir, On the Brink: Inside the Race to Stop the Collapse of the Global Financial System, was published by Hachette Book Group on February 1, 2010.

On October 6, 2014, Paulson testified in Starr v. United States, a lawsuit alleging that the government cheated American International Group shareholders of $40 billion by demanding a 79.9% stake in the company."AIG, either fairly or unfairly, ... became a symbol for all that is bad on Wall Street," Paulson said. He acknowledged that the terms of the bailout were meant to be "punitive."

In September 2015, Paulson was awarded an honorary doctorate of laws and environmental policy by Washington College President and former FDIC Chair Sheila Bair.

In April 2016, he was one of eight former Treasury secretaries who called on the United Kingdom to remain a member of the European Union ahead of the June 2016 Referendum. In June, Paulson announced his support for the Never Trump movement and endorsed Hillary Clinton for the presidency. In his op-ed to The Washington Post Paulson wrote, "The GOP, in putting Trump at the top of the ticket, is endorsing a brand of populism rooted in ignorance, prejudice, fear and isolationism."

Paulson is a leader of the Climate Leadership Council, co-authoring along with James A. Baker III, Greg Mankiw, Martin Feldstein, Ted Halstead, George P. Shultz, Thomas F. Stephenson, and S. Robson Walton a carbon fee and dividend proposal for the United States in 2017 as a climate change mitigation policy.

=== The Paulson Institute ===
On June 27, 2011, Paulson announced the formation of the Paulson Institute, a non-partisan, independent "think and do tank" dedicated to fostering a US-China relationship that serves to maintain global order in a rapidly evolving world. Paulson was also named as a senior fellow at the University of Chicago's Harris School of Public Policy. His five-year appointment took effect July 1, 2011.

=== Author ===
In his memoirs, On the Brink, Paulson describes his experiences as Treasury Secretary fending off the near-collapse of the U.S. economy during the Great Recession. His second book, Dealing with China, details his career working with scores of China's top political and business leaders and witnessing the evolution of China's state-controlled capitalism. The book was chosen by Facebook founder Mark Zuckerberg for the Mark Zuckerberg book club.

== Civic activities ==
Paulson has been described as an avid nature lover. He has been a member of The Nature Conservancy for decades and was the organization's board chairman and co-chair of its Asia-Pacific Council. In that capacity, Paulson worked with former President of China Jiang Zemin to preserve the Tiger Leaping Gorge in Yunnan. Paulson co-chaired a group called Risky Business that raised awareness of the projected economic impact of climate change. He is a long-time supporter of Rare (conservation organization) where his wife Wendy is the Chair Emerita.

Paulson co-chairs the Aspen Economic Strategy Group with Erskine Bowles. He was the founding chairman of the advisory board of the School of Economics and Management of Tsinghua University in Beijing.

Notable among the members of Bush's cabinet, Paulson has said he is a strong believer in the effect of human activity on global warming and advocates immediate action to decrease this effect.

During his tenure as CEO of Goldman Sachs, Paulson oversaw the corporate donation of 680,000 acres (2,800 km^{2}) on the forested Chilean side of Tierra del Fuego, bringing criticism from Goldman shareholder groups. He further donated to conservancy causes US$100 million of assets from his wealth, and has pledged his entire fortune for the same purpose upon his death.

== Personal life ==
He met his wife, Wendy (née Judge), a Wellesley College graduate, during his senior year.

The couple has two adult children, sports-team owner Henry Merritt Paulson III, more commonly known as Merritt Paulson, and journalist Amanda Paulson, also a graduate of Dartmouth. The Paulsons became grandparents in June 2007.

They maintain homes in both Chicago and Barrington Hills, a suburb of Chicago. In 2016, Wendy Paulson expressed the importance of Christian Science teaching in their lives.

== In media ==
Paulson was portrayed by William Hurt in the 2011 HBO film Too Big to Fail and by James Cromwell in the 2009 BBC film The Last Days of Lehman Brothers.

In the 2010 documentary film Inside Job, Paulson is cited as one of the persons responsible for the economic meltdown of 2008 and named in Time as one of the "25 People to Blame for the Financial Crisis".

In September 2013, Bloomberg Businessweek released the documentary film Hank: Five Years From the Brink, directed by Oscar-nominated Joe Berlinger and distributed by Netflix.

Paulson is featured in the 2018 HBO documentary Panic: The Untold Story of the Financial Crisis.

== Honors and recognition ==
- 2007, Golden Plate Award of the American Academy of Achievement presented by Awards Council member Richard M. Daley, the Mayor of Chicago
- 2011, The Committee of 100's "Leadership Award for Advancing U.S.–China Relations"
- 2016, Environmental Law Institute's Environmental Achievement Award
- 2009, Harvard Business School's Alumni Achievement Award Recipient

== Bibliography ==
- Paulson, Hank and Hu, Fred: "Banking Reform in China: Mission Critical", in: Pamela Mar and Frank-Jürgen Richter: China – Enabling a New Era of Changes, New York: John Wiley, 2003, ISBN 0-470-82086-1
- Paulson, Henry M. (2013) [2010]. On the Brink: Inside the Race to Stop the Collapse of the Global Financial System (2nd ed.). Business Plus. ISBN 978-1455551903.
- Paulson, Henry M. (2016) [2015]. Dealing with China: An Insider Unmasks the New Economic Superpower (Reprint ed.). Twelve. ISBN 978-1455504206.
- Bernanke, Ben S.; Geithner, Timothy F.; Paulson, Henry M. (2019). Firefighting: The Financial Crisis and Its Lessons. Penguin Books. ISBN 978-0143134480.
- Bernanke, Ben S.; Geithner, Timothy F.; Paulson, Henry M. (2020). First Responders: Inside the U.S. Strategy for Fighting the 2007-2009 Global Financial Crisis. Yale University Press. ISBN 978-0300244441.

Business positions
Preceded by Jon Corzine	Chief Executive Officer of Goldman Sachs; 1999–2006	Succeeded by Lloyd Blankfein
Political offices
Preceded by John W. Snow	United States Secretary of the Treasury; 2006–2009	Succeeded by Timothy Geithner
U.S. order of precedence (ceremonial)
Preceded by Michael Chertoff as Former U.S. Cabinet Member	Order of precedence of the United States as Former U.S. Cabinet Member	Succeeded by Mary E. Peters as Former U.S. Cabinet Member
