= E. Gerald Corrigan =

American banker (1941–2022)

Gerry Corrigan
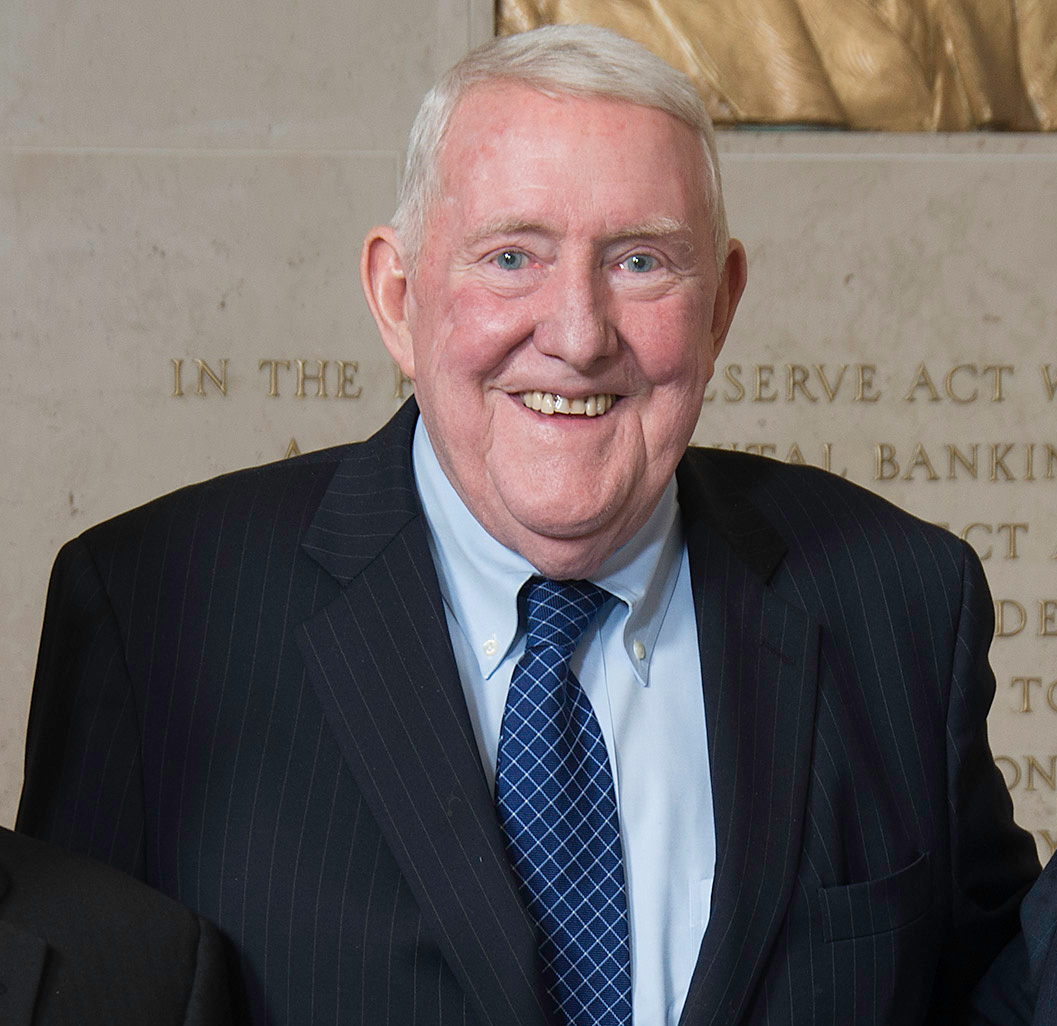
- Corrigan in 2014

7th President of the Federal Reserve Bank of New York
- In office January 1, 1985 – July 19, 1993
- Preceded by: Anthony M. Solomon
- Succeeded by: William McDonough

10th President of the Federal Reserve Bank of Minneapolis
- In office 1980–1984
- Preceded by: Mark H. Willes
- Succeeded by: Gary H. Stern

Personal details
- Born: Edward Gerald Corrigan; June 13, 1941 Waterbury, Connecticut, U.S.
- Died: May 17, 2022 (aged 80) Dedham, Massachusetts, U.S.
- Spouse: Cathy Minehan
- Education: Fairfield University (BA); Fordham University (MA, PhD)

Edward Gerald Corrigan (June 13, 1941 – May 17, 2022) was an American banker who was the seventh President of the Federal Reserve Bank of New York and vice-chairman of the Federal Open Market Committee. Corrigan served as a partner and managing director in the office of the chairman at Goldman Sachs and was appointed chairman of GS Bank USA, the bank holding company of Goldman Sachs, in September 2008 until retiring in 2016. He was also a member of the Group of Thirty, an influential international body of leading financiers and academics.

== Education ==
Corrigan earned a bachelor's degree in economics from Fairfield University in 1963. He received a master's degree in 1965 and a Ph.D. in 1971, both in economics, from Fordham University.

== Career ==
=== Federal Reserve ===
Corrigan began his career at the New York Federal Reserve in 1968 where he remained for twenty-five years, becoming vice president in 1976, and serving as a Special Assistant to Federal Reserve Board Chairman, Paul Volcker in Washington, D.C. He went on to serve as president of the Federal Reserve Bank of Minneapolis from 1980 to 1984 and President of the Federal Reserve Bank of New York from 1985 until 1993.

From 1991 to 1993 he was Chairman of the Basel Committee on Banking Supervision. From 1993 to 1995 he was director of the Council on Foreign Relations.

=== Post-Federal Reserve; Goldman Sachs ===
Corrigan joined Goldman Sachs in 1994 working as a Managing Director, and he has been a partner since 1996. He served as co-chair of both the Risk Committee and the Global Compliance and Controls Committee at Goldman Sachs. In 1994 Corrigan also joined the influential Washington-based financial advisory body, the Group of Thirty.

Since 1999, Corrigan has served as Chairman of the Counterparty Risk Management Policy Group (CRMPG). The CRMPG is a financial industry policy group designed to promote enhanced strong practices in counterparty credit risk and market risk management. In this capacity Corrigan testified before the Committee on Financial Services of the U.S. House of Representatives concerning hedge funds and systematic risk in the financial markets on March 13, 2007. In concluding his testimony, Corrigan foreshadowed the pending 2008 financial crisis by stating "[o]ne of the most difficult challenges in human endeavor is how we manage low probability events – such as financial shocks – that can cause so much damage. In the financial arena I believe we are making progress in meeting that challenge and we must continue the effort for we know that the future will bring new tests of the stability and resiliency of the financial system."

In 2005, the Global Association of Risk Professionals awarded their "Risk Manager of the Year" designation to Corrigan.

In a major article in April 2009 about Obama Administration Treasury Secretary Timothy Geithner and his role in the 2008 financial crisis, The New York Times writers traced the evolution of the AIG part in the crisis in September, 2008. A.I.G.'s chief executive at the time, Robert B. Willumstad, was seeking help raising capital from JP MorganChase, not using Goldman Sachs because it was "one of A.I.G.'s biggest trading partners" and, Mr. Willumstad believed, "the potential conflicts of interest ... were too great." However, on "Monday, Sept. 15, Mr. Geithner pushed A.I.G. to bring Goldman onto its team to raise capital," the article said, quoting Mr. Willumstad. "Mr. Geithner and Mr. Corrigan ... were close, speaking frequently and sometimes lunching together at Goldman headquarters. On [Sep. 15th], the company's chief executive, Lloyd C. Blankfein, was at the New York Fed. A Goldman spokesman [told the Times] 'We don't believe anyone at Goldman Sachs asked Mr. Geithner to include the firm in the assignment.' Mr. Geithner said he had suggested Goldman get involved because the situation was chaotic and 'time was running out,'" the article concluded relative to Mr. Corrigan's and Goldman's involvements with the then-NY Fed president Geithner.

The article went on, though, relative to the episode as a whole, "A.I.G.'s search for [private] capital was fruitless" and the Federal Reserve led by Chairman Ben Bernanke and the Treasury led by Secretary Hank Paulson (formerly of Goldman) had to come to the rescue. "By late Tuesday afternoon [Sep. 16], the government would step in with an $85 billion loan, the first installment of a bailout that now stands at $182 billion. As part of the bailout, A.I.G.'s trading partners, including Goldman, were compensated fully for money owed to them by A.I.G. Analysts say the New York Fed should have pressed A.I.G.'s trading partners to take a deep discount on what they were owed. But Mr. Geithner said he had no bargaining power because he was unwilling to threaten A.I.G.'s trading partners with a bankruptcy by the insurer for fear of further destabilizing the system. A recent report on the A.I.G. bailout by the Government Accountability Office found that taxpayers may never get their money back."

In February, 2010, Corrigan faced inquiry in the House of Commons Treasury committee in London, England for Goldman's involvement with currency swaps executed with the Greek government. The swaps, Corrigan acknowledged, "did produce a small reduction in the debt to GDP ratio at the time." The ratio in turn was a factor in the economic management of Greek finances within the European Union and the Euro currency, and during the euro area crisis. Corrigan's testimony continued, "With the benefit of hindsight, it seems very clear that standards of transparency could have been and should have been higher." The report on his testimony concluded, "Corrigan's key defence against the Greek allegations was that every bank was cooking up deals with European governments — not just Greece. It's no lie."

In the May 7, 2010, Goldman public stockholders' meeting, the company "announced the creation of an internal committee that will examine possible conflicts of interest and other issues such as transparency and disclosure. It's headed by Vice Chairman [Michael] Evans and ... Corrigan, chairman of Goldman Sachs Bank USA. No board members are involved." The report on this development was part of a larger analysis of the role of the board of directors in the oversight of the management, business and ethics of the company, in light of the intense scrutiny of the company's role in the 2008 financial crisis and related events.

== Philanthropic giving ==
Fairfield University honored Corrigan in 1981 with an Alumni Professional Achievement Award. And in 2008, Corrigan donated $5 million to Fairfield to establish the E. Gerald Corrigan '63 Chair in the Humanities and Social Sciences and the Mary Hardy Corrigan Reading Room, named for Corrigan's mother and located on the second level of the DiMenna-Nyselius Library.

In 2007, Corrigan donated $5 million to Fordham University to establish the Corrigan Chair in International Business and Finance at the Graduate School of Business Administration.

== Personal ==
Corrigan was married to Cathy Minehan, President of the Federal Reserve Bank of Boston from 1994 to 2007.

Corrigan died at the age of 80 on May 17, 2022, from complications of Alzheimer's disease at a facility in Dedham, Massachusetts.

== See also ==
- 2008 financial crisis

Other offices
Preceded by Mark H. Willes	President of the Federal Reserve Bank of Minneapolis; 1980–1984	Succeeded by Gary H. Stern
Preceded by Anthony M. Solomon	President of the Federal Reserve Bank of New York; 1985–1993	Succeeded by William McDonough
