= Allan Sproul =

American banker

President of the Federal Reserve Bank of New York
- In office January 1, 1941 – June 30, 1956
- Preceded by: George Harrison
- Succeeded by: Alfred Hayes

Personal details
- Born: March 9, 1896; San Francisco, California, U.S.
- Died: April 9, 1978 (aged 82); Kentfield, California, U.S.
- Education: University of California, Berkeley (BA); New York University (LLB)

Allan Sproul (March 9, 1896 – April 9, 1978) was an American banker. Widely regarded as one of the world's foremost central bankers, he served as President of the Federal Reserve Bank of New York from 1941 to 1956.

== Biography ==
He was born on March 9, 1896, in San Francisco, California. He graduated from the University of California at Berkeley and was awarded a J.D. from New York University. He joined the Federal Reserve System in 1920 as head of the division of analysis and research of the San Francisco Fed. In 1930, he came to the Federal Reserve Bank of New York as an assistant deputy governor and secretary, and six years later, when official titles changed, he was appointed first vice president.

As one of the leading central bankers in United States history, Sproul made major contributions in solving monetary problems. He was named vice chairman of the Federal Open Market Committee (the system's top monetary policymaking unit) when the New York Fed was given permanent representation on that committee in 1942.

In 1956, he resigned from the New York Fed and returned to California to serve as a director of Wells Fargo Bank. He was appointed a director of that bank's holding company in 1969. Sproul also served as a director of Kaiser Aluminum and Chemical Corporation.

He died of a heart attack at his home in California on April 9, 1978.

Other offices
Preceded by George Harrison	President of the Federal Reserve Bank of New York; 1941–1956	Succeeded by Alfred Hayes
