= Interim Committee =

Secret U.S. advisory group on nuclear energy (May–December 1945)

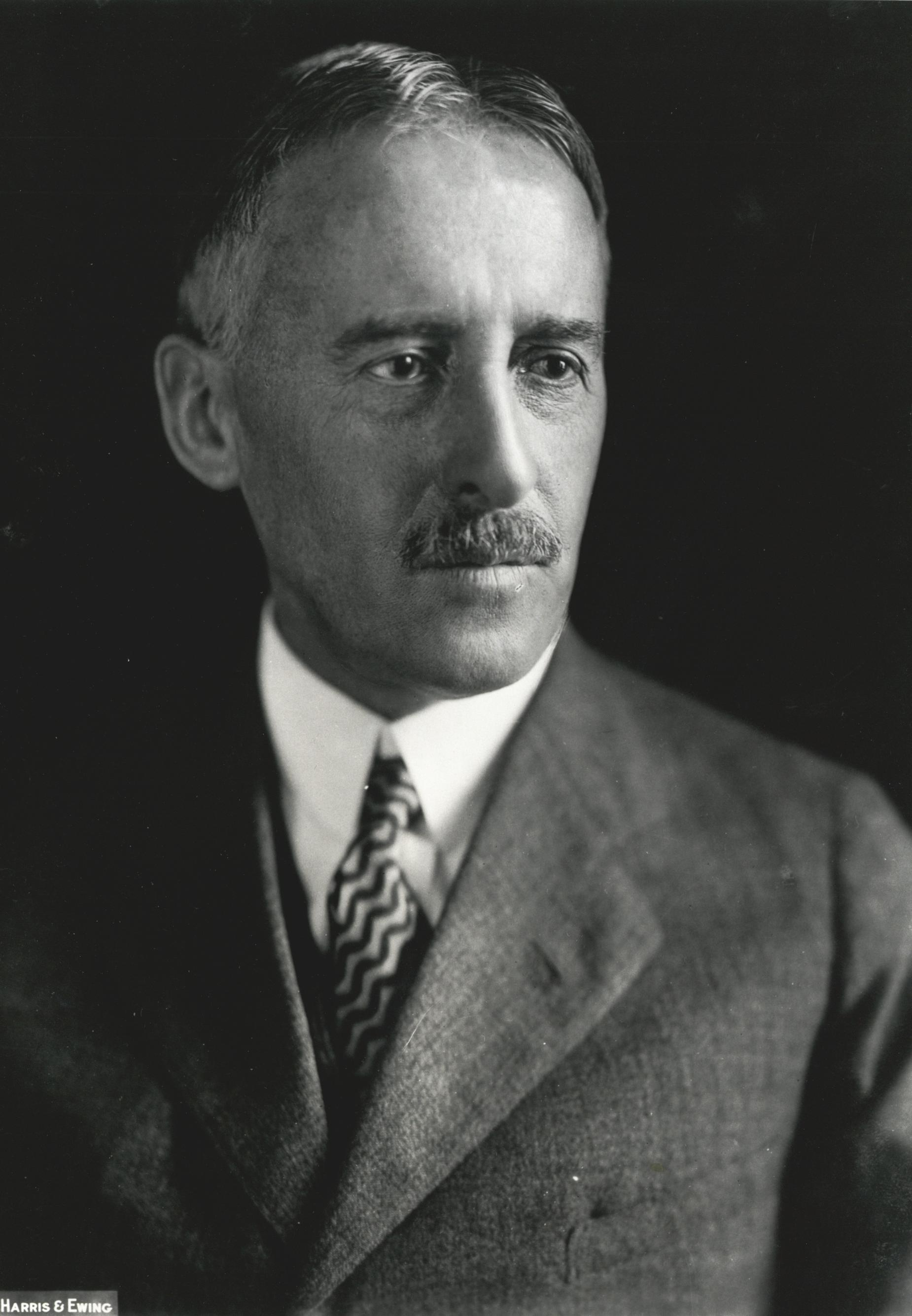
Henry L. Stimson

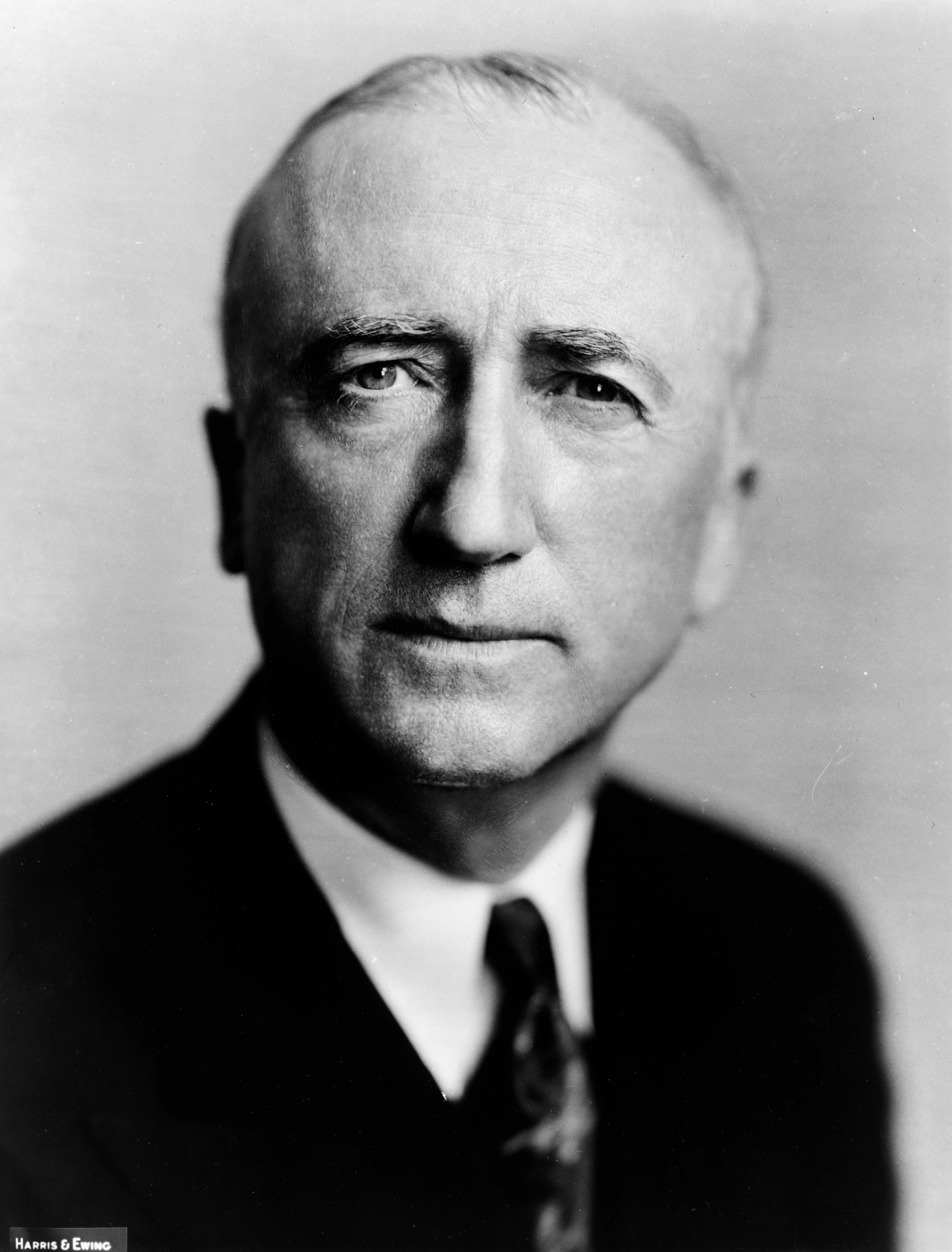
James F. Byrnes

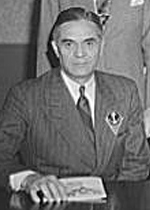
Ralph A. Bard

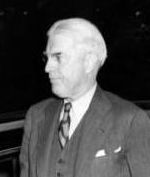
William L. Clayton

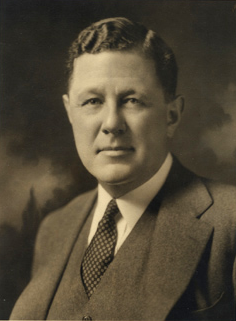
George L. Harrison

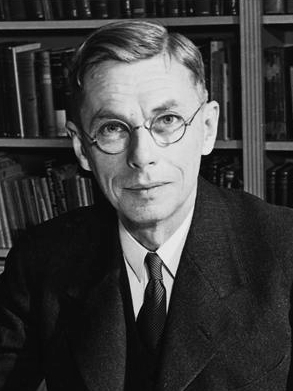
James B. Conant

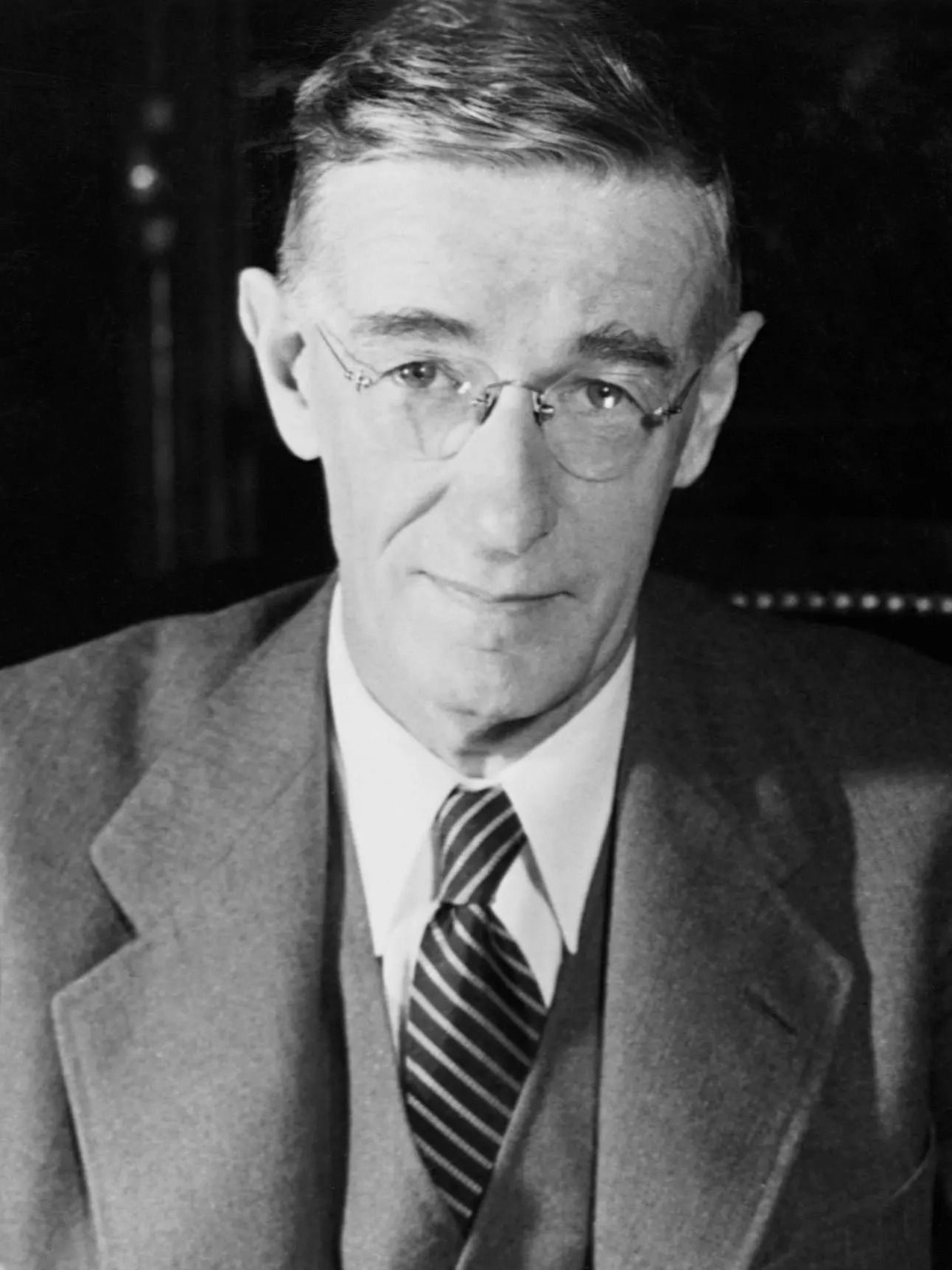
Vannevar Bush

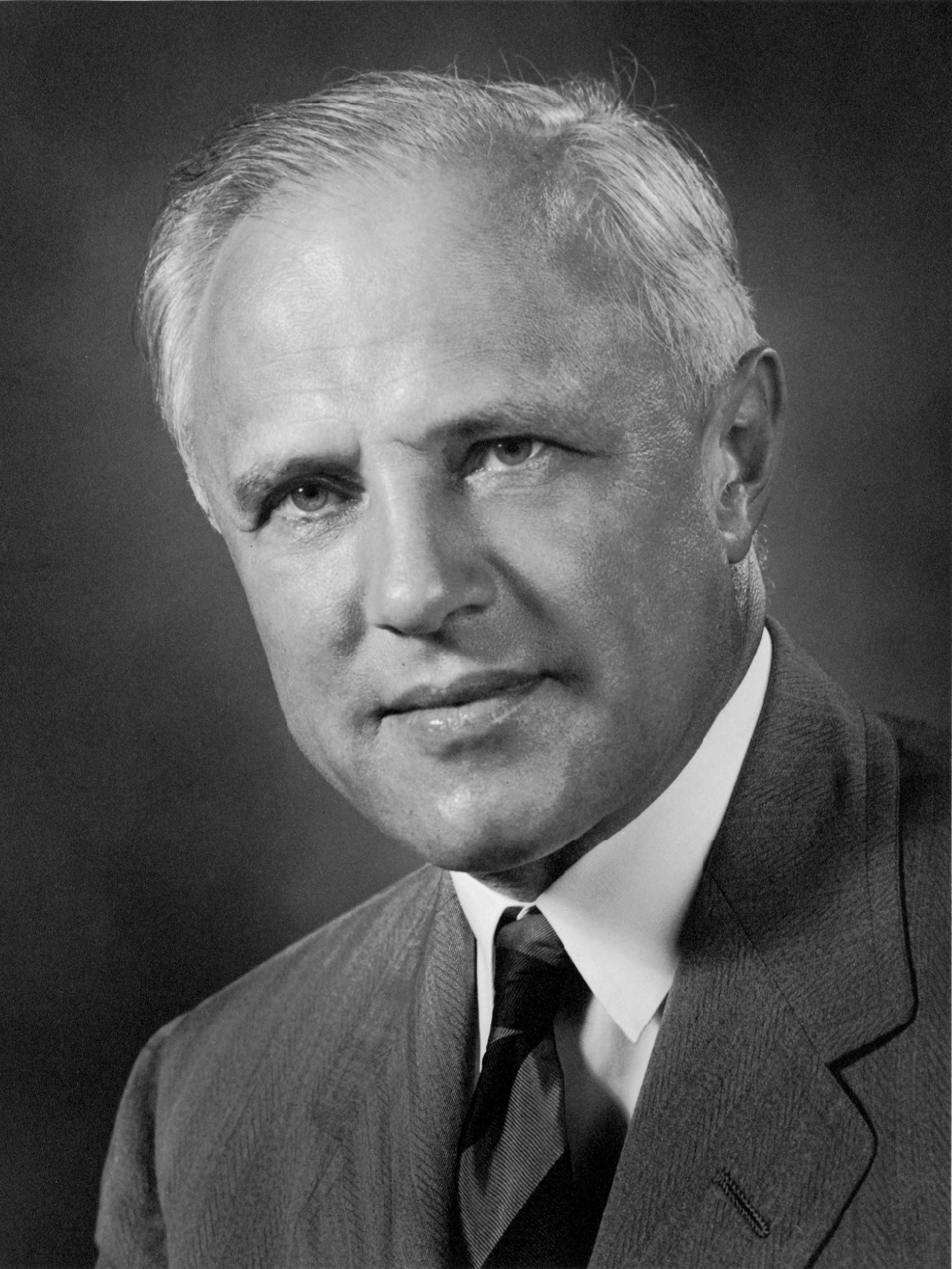
Karl T. Compton

The Interim Committee was a secret high-level group created in May 1945 by United States secretary of war Henry L. Stimson at the urging of leaders of the Manhattan Project and with the approval of President Harry S. Truman to advise on matters pertaining to nuclear energy, and replaced the Military Policy Committee.

Composed of prominent political, scientific and industrial figures, the Interim Committee had broad terms of reference which included advising the President on wartime controls and the release of information, and making recommendations on post-war controls and policies related to nuclear energy, including legislation. Its first duty was to advise on the manner in which nuclear weapons should be employed against Japan. Later, it advised on legislation for the control and regulation of nuclear energy. It was named "Interim" in anticipation of a permanent body that would later replace it after the war, where the development of nuclear technology would be placed firmly under civilian control. The Atomic Energy Commission was enacted in 1946 to serve this function.

== Composition ==
Stimson himself was chairman. The other members were: James F. Byrnes, former US senator and soon to be Secretary of State, as President Truman's personal representative; Ralph A. Bard, Under Secretary of the Navy; William L. Clayton, Assistant Secretary of State; Vannevar Bush, Director of the Office of Scientific Research and Development and president of the Carnegie Institution; Karl T. Compton, Chief of the Office of Field Service in the Office of Scientific Research and Development and president of Massachusetts Institute of Technology; James B. Conant, Chairman of the National Defense Research Committee and president of Harvard University; and George L. Harrison, an assistant to Stimson and president of the New York Life Insurance Company. Harrison chaired the committee when Stimson was absent, but Byrnes, as the President's personal representative, was probably its most influential member.

The Interim Committee held its first meeting on 9 May 1945. Stimson began by outlining its broad terms of reference, which included advising the President on wartime controls and the release of information, and making recommendations on post-war controls and policies related to nuclear energy, including legislation. The Interim Committee was not specifically charged with making recommendations on the military use of nuclear weapons but the composition of the committee and the close relationship between the wartime use of nuclear weapons and post-war policies regarding them inevitably led to the Interim Committee's involvement.

== Decision on use of atomic bombs ==
The most immediate of the committee's tasks, one that has been the focus of much subsequent controversy, was to make recommendations concerning the use of the atomic bomb against Japan. The committee's consensus, arrived at in a meeting held June 1, 1945, is described as follows in the meeting's log:

Mr. Byrnes recommended, and the Committee agreed, that the Secretary of War should be advised that, while recognizing that the final selection of the target was essentially a military decision, the present view of the Committee was that the bomb should be used against Japan as soon as possible; that it be used on a war plant surrounded by workers’ homes; and that it be used without prior warning.

One member, Bard, later dissented from this decision and in a memorandum to Stimson laid out a case for a warning to Japan before using the bomb.

In arriving at its conclusion, the committee was advised by a Scientific Panel of four physicists from the Manhattan Project: Enrico Fermi and Arthur H. Compton of the Metallurgical Laboratory at the University of Chicago; Ernest O. Lawrence of the Radiation Laboratory at the University of California at Berkeley; and J. Robert Oppenheimer, who directed the bomb assembly program at Los Alamos. Reinforcing the decision arrived at on June 1, the scientists wrote in a formal report on June 16:

The opinions of our scientific colleagues on the initial use of these weapons are not unanimous: they range from the proposal of a purely technical demonstration to that of the military application best designed to induce surrender. Those who advocate a purely technical demonstration would wish to outlaw the use of atomic weapons, and have feared that if we use the weapons now our position in future negotiations will be prejudiced. Others emphasize the opportunity of saving American lives by immediate military use, and believe that such use will improve the international prospects, in that they are more concerned with the prevention of war than with the elimination of this specific weapon. We find ourselves closer to these latter views; we can propose no technical demonstration likely to bring an end to the war; we see no acceptable alternative to direct military use.

Although the committee's recommendation was addressed to Stimson, Byrnes went directly from the June 1 meeting to brief Truman, who reportedly concurred with the committee's opinion. Reviewing the Scientific Panel's report on June 21, the committee reaffirmed its position:

...that the weapon be used against Japan at the earliest opportunity, that it be used without warning, and that it be used on a dual target, namely, a military installation or war plant surrounded by or adjacent to homes or other buildings most susceptible to damage.

== Press releases ==
The Interim Committee was given responsibility for the preparation of separate prepared statements for the President and the Secretary of War to be released when nuclear weapons were used. The job of drafting them was given to William Laurence. Laurence submitted them to Arthur W. Page for review, and he in turn passed them on to the Interim Committee. At its meeting on July 6, the Interim Committee considered and adopted a set of British suggestions. The final draft of President Truman's speech was handed to him at the Potsdam Conference on August 1. Following the dropping of an atomic bomb on the Japanese city of Hiroshima on August 6, Truman read out the press release, which declared that:

With this bomb we have now added a new and revolutionary increase in destruction to supplement the growing power of our armed forces. In their present form these bombs are now in production and even more powerful forms are in development.

It is an atomic bomb. It is a harnessing of the basic power of the universe. The force from which the sun draws its power has been loosed against those who brought war to the Far East.

== Post-war legislation ==
In July 1944, before the Interim Committee was formed, Bush, Conant, and Irvin Stewart had produced a proposal for legislation to control nuclear energy. Conant submitted the proposals to the Interim Committee at its meeting on July 9, 1945. Harrison brought in two experienced lawyers, Kenneth Royall and William L. Marbury, to take up the job of drafting the legislation. Their draft bill would have created a nine-man commission consisting of five civilian and four military members. It granted the commission broad powers to acquire property, to operate facilities, to conduct research and to regulate all forms of nuclear energy. The Royall-Marbury bill was reviewed by the Interim Committee at its July 19 meeting and revised in line with their suggestions. The bill was forwarded to the President in August. The Interim Committee met again on September 28 to discuss legislative strategy. The Royall-Marbury bill was introduced into the United States Congress by the chairman of the House Military Affairs Committee, Andrew J. May, and the ranking member of the Senate Committee on Military Affairs, Senator Edwin C. Johnson, on October 3. It then became known as the May-Johnson bill.

The May-Johnson bill soon ran into difficulties. Although the Interim Committee was discharged in November, it met one more time in December to discuss amendments to the May-Johnson bill. On December 20, 1945, Senator Brien McMahon introduced an alternative Senate bill on atomic energy, which quickly became known as the McMahon bill. This was initially a very liberal bill towards the control of scientific research, and was broadly supported by scientists. McMahon framed the controversy as a question of military versus civilian control of atomic energy, although the May-Johnson bill also provided for civilian control of atomic energy. In 1946, several major revisions were made to the McMahon bill to appease the more conservative elements in the Senate. The resulting bill passed both the Senate and the House without major modifications. On August 1, 1946, Truman signed the McMahon bill into law as the Atomic Energy Act of 1946.
