= George L. Harrison =

American banker, insurance executive and advisor

George Harrison
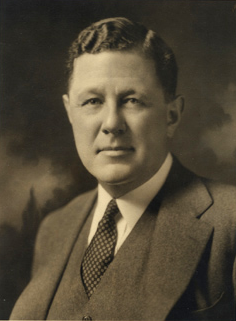

President of the Federal Reserve Bank of New York
- In office November 24, 1928 – December 31, 1940
- Preceded by: Benjamin Strong Jr.
- Succeeded by: Allan Sproul

Personal details
- Born: George Leslie Harrison; January 26, 1887 San Francisco, California, U.S.
- Died: March 5, 1958 (aged 71) New York City, New York, U.S.
- Resting place: Rock Creek Cemetery; Washington, D.C., U.S.
- Education: Yale University (BA); Harvard University (LLB)
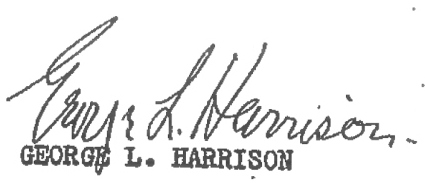
- Signature

George Leslie Harrison (January 26, 1887 – March 5, 1958) was an American banker, insurance executive and advisor to Secretary of War Henry L. Stimson during World War II.

== Early life and education ==
Harrison was born in San Francisco, California, on January 26, 1887. In 1909, at Yale University, he was elected to the Skull and Bones secret society. He graduated from Yale University in 1910 and Harvard Law School in 1913.

== Career ==
After earning his law degree, Harrison became law clerk for one year to U.S. Supreme Court Justice Oliver Wendell Holmes.

After serving as general counsel to the Federal Reserve Board, Harrison served as president of the Federal Reserve Bank of New York for 13 years, starting in 1928. A year after he became president of the New York branch, the U.S. economy went into a recession. Harrison tried to curb an emerging stock bubble and persuaded the Federal Reserve board to raise interest rates, instead of letting the stock market react naturally to economic conditions. In October 1929, the stock market crashed, starting the Great Depression. The Federal Reserve raised interest rates again following the crash and also failed to increase the money supply to combat deflation, thereby allowing conditions to deteriorate further.

Harrison left the Federal Reserve in 1941 to become president of New York Life Insurance Company.

During World War II, Harrison was War Secretary Henry L. Stimson's special assistant for matters relating to the development of the atomic bomb called the Manhattan Project. He served with Stimson on the eight-member Interim Committee which examined problems expected to result from the bomb's creation and which recommended direct military use of the bomb against Japan without specific warning. Harrison chaired the committee when Stimson was absent, including at the Potsdam Conference.

One of Harrison's notable moments in this role was when he informed Secretary Stimson of the successful first test of the atomic bomb in New Mexico. Specifically, he cabled to him that:

"Doctor has just returned most enthusiastic and confident that the little boy is as husky as his big brother. The light in his eyes discernible from here to high hold and I could have heard his screams from here to my farm."

Harrison and Stimson had not worked out a code for describing the test results ahead of time, so Harrison improvised the above, knowing Stimson would understand it to mean General Leslie Groves ("Doctor") had returned from New Mexico to Washington, D.C., and had reported that the tested "Fat Man" implosion-type atomic bomb (fueled by of plutonium-239) was as successful as the untested "Little Boy" bomb (fueled by uranium-235) was expected to be (prior to the test, the implosion design was expected to be much less powerful in its present form than the gun-type bomb). The light from here to high hold refers how the detonation was visible from "here" in Washington, D.C. to Stimson's Highhold estate nearly 250 miles away on Long Island. The bomb was so loud that Harrison could hear the detonation from "here" in Washington, D.C. to his farm on Upperville, VA, nearly 50 miles away.

Harrison returned to his position at New York Life after the war, becoming chair of the company's board in 1948.

== Personal life ==
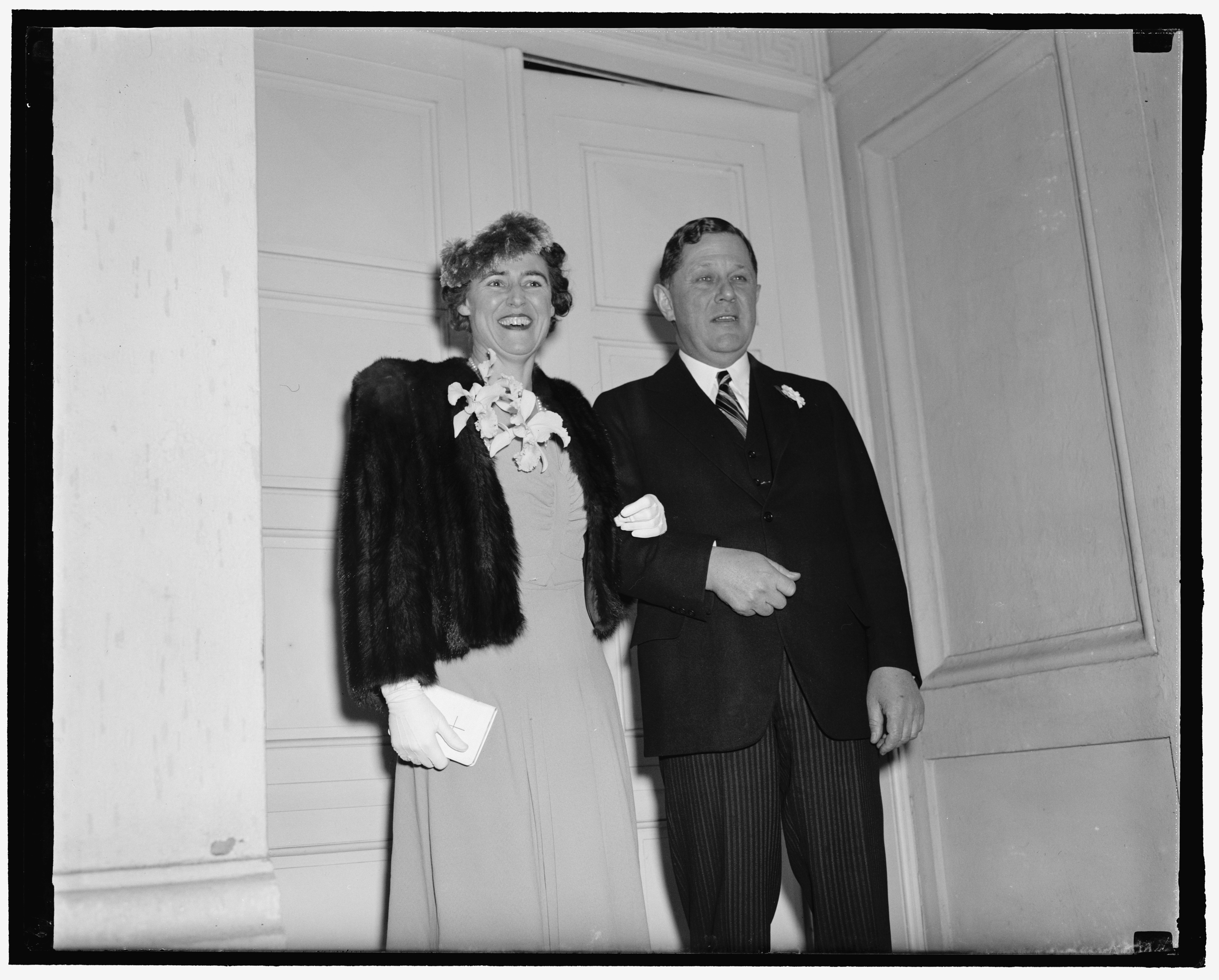
Harrison and his bride Alice at their wedding in 1940

Harrison married the widow of Rear Admiral Cary T. Grayson, who was the former Alice Gertrude Gordon.

Harrison died of a cerebral hemorrhage in New York City in 1958 and is buried in Rock Creek Cemetery in Washington, DC.

== See also ==
- List of law clerks for the second seat of the Supreme Court of the United States

Other offices
Preceded by Benjamin Strong Jr.	President of the Federal Reserve Bank of New York; 1928–1940	Succeeded by Allan Sproul
