= Alfred Hayes (banker) =

American banker and economist

President of the Federal Reserve Bank of New York
- In office August 1, 1956 – August 1, 1975
- Preceded by: Allan Sproul
- Succeeded by: Paul Volcker

Personal details
- Born: July 4, 1910; Ithaca, New York, U.S.
- Died: October 21, 1989 (aged 79); New Canaan, Connecticut, U.S.
- Spouse: Bebba Chalmers
- Children: 2
- Education: Yale University (BA); Harvard University; New College, Oxford

Alfred Hayes Jr. (July 4, 1910 – October 21, 1989) was an American banker and an expert in international finance. As president of the Federal Reserve Bank of New York from 1956 to 1975, Hayes was known as a conservative money manager who took a strong stand against inflation. He also had a reputation as a lightning-fast mathematician.

== Early life and education ==
Hayes was born on July 4, 1910, in Ithaca, New York, the son of Christine (Robertson) and Alfred Hayes. He was a student at Harvard College before transferring to Yale, where he completed a Bachelor of Arts degree in chemistry. He then studied for a year at the Harvard Business School before attending New College, Oxford as a Rhodes Scholar. At Oxford, Hayes studied economics.

== Career ==
In 1933, Hayes became an analyst for the investment department of City Bank Farmers Trust Co. In 1940 he transferred to the bond department of the National City Bank. Two years later he became assistant secretary in the investment department of the New York Trust Company. During World War II, Hayes served for two years in Washington, D.C., and Rome as a U.S. Navy lieutenant in the office of financial planning for military government and later in the office of the Foreign Liquidation Commissioner. After the war, Hayes returned to New York Trust, where he became assistant vice president (1947). From 1949 to 1955 Hayes served as vice president in charge of the Trust's foreign division.

Hayes served from 1956 to 1975 as president of the Federal Reserve Bank of New York and vice chairman of the Federal Open Market Committee. He was opposed to the de-monetisation of gold.

After leaving the Federal Reserve, Hayes served as chairman of Morgan Stanley International. He retired in 1981. He died on October 21, 1989.

Hayes was married to Vilma, daughter of Thomas Hardie Chalmers.

Other offices
Preceded by Allan Sproul	President of the Federal Reserve Bank of New York; 1956–1975	Succeeded by Paul Volcker
