= William C. Dudley =

American banker

Bill Dudley
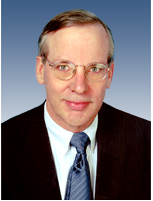

10th President of the Federal Reserve Bank of New York
- In office January 27, 2009 – June 18, 2018
- Preceded by: Tim Geithner
- Succeeded by: John Williams

Personal details
- Born: 1953 (age 71–72)
- Spouse: Ann Darby
- Education: New College of Florida (BA); University of California, Berkeley (MA, PhD)

William C. Dudley (born 1953) is an American economist who served as the president of Federal Reserve Bank of New York from 2009 to 2018 and as vice-chairman of the Federal Open Market Committee. He was appointed to the position on January 27, 2009, following the confirmation of his predecessor, Timothy F. Geithner, as United States Secretary of the Treasury.

== Early life and education ==
Dudley attended the Williston Northampton School in Easthampton, Massachusetts. He spent his freshman year at Columbia University and subsequently earned a B.A. degree from New College of Florida in 1974, and a PhD in economics from the University of California, Berkeley in 1982.

== Career ==
Dudley worked at Goldman Sachs from 1986 to 2007 where he held the position of chief U.S. economist. In 2007 he was hired by then-president of the New York Federal Reserve Timothy Geithner to oversee the Markets Group, the department in charge of executing monetary policy on behalf of the Federal Open Market Committee. When Timothy Geithner became the Secretary of Treasury in 2009, Dudley became the 10th President of the Federal Reserve Bank of New York.

In 2019, Dudley joined the Griswold Center for Economic Policy Studies at Princeton University as a senior research scholar. He is currently the Chair of the Bretton Woods Committee. He is a member of the Group of Thirty and the Council on Foreign Relations. He was a member of the Bank for International Settlements Board of Directors from 2009 to 2018 and chaired the BIS Committee on Payment and Settlement Systems (2009-2012) and the Committee on the Global Financial System (2012-2018).

Dudley worked closely with Chairman Bernanke, Chair Yellen, and Chairman Powell as Vice-Chairman of the FOMC during 2009–2018.

== Economic views ==
Dudley pioneered the importance of financial conditions in assessing the appropriate stance of monetary policy. He also led an effort by the NY Fed to highlight the importance of improving culture and conduct in the financial services industry. He has stressed the importance of incentives. Incentives drive conduct and behavior and this helps establish the social norms that define culture.

In 2002, Dudley wrote the Federal Reserve should have "tightened policy earlier and more aggressively during the 1996-1999 period", with the hope that the downward forces would not have been so intense after the collapse of the stock market that began in 2000.

Dudley was criticized for remarks over food inflation in 2011 when he argued that you have to look at all prices when looking at inflation. He noted that some prices like the iPad were effectively falling as the next generation was twice as powerful at the same price. A member of the crowd shouted "I can't eat an iPad".

When asked about the drop in the stock market on February 8, 2018, Dudley said, "So far, I'd say this is small potatoes."

In December 2020, Dudley noted that an inflation scare was likely. Base effects and supply chain disruptions were likely to push inflation well above 2%. Dudley also highlighted the flaws in the Fed’s new long-term monetary framework, pointing out that how the Fed operationalized its new 2% average inflation targeting regime meant that it would be slow to tighten monetary policy. The likely result would be the Fed forced to respond more aggressively later, resulting in higher short-term rates and, ultimately, a greater risk of a hard landing and recession.

He led the Group of Thirty team that published: Bank Failures and Contagion: Lender of Last Resort, Liquidity and Risk Management (January 2024). He also was the author of the Bretton Woods Committee report: A Dual Strategy to Transform Cross-Border Payments (December 2024). In addition, he has been a Bloomberg opinion columnist since 2019.

== Personal ==
Together with his wife Ann, Dudley has been a resident of Cranford, New Jersey, where his wife has been an active community volunteer.

Other offices
Preceded by Tim Geithner	President of the Federal Reserve Bank of New York; 2009–2018	Succeeded by John Williams
