= Federal Reserve Bank of New York Buffalo Branch =

Former Federal Reserve branch

Coordinates: 42°53′20″N 78°52′41″W

The Federal Reserve Bank of New York Buffalo Branch was a branch of the Federal Reserve Bank of New York that was closed on 31 October 2008 (17 years ago). It was located in the Federal Reserve Building at 160 Delaware Avenue, which has now been inhabited by the New Era Cap Company since November 21, 2006.

== See also ==
- Federal Reserve Act
- Federal Reserve System
- Federal Reserve Districts
- Federal Reserve Branches
- Federal Reserve Bank of New York
