= List of presidents of the Federal Reserve Bank of New York =

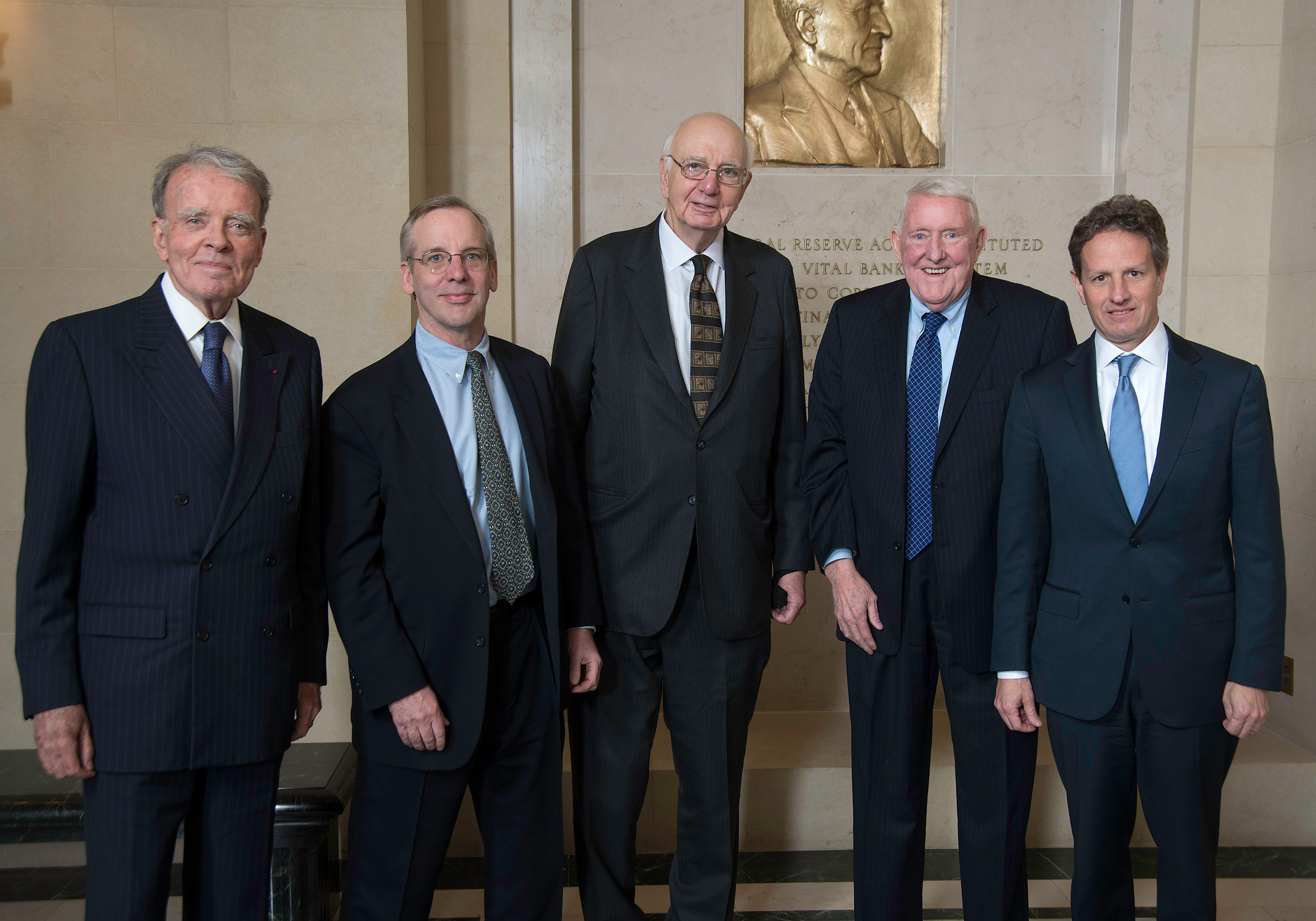
Left to Right: William J. McDonough (1993–2003), William C. Dudley (2009–2018), Paul Volcker (1975–1979), E. Gerald Corrigan (1985–1993), Timothy Geithner (2003–2008)

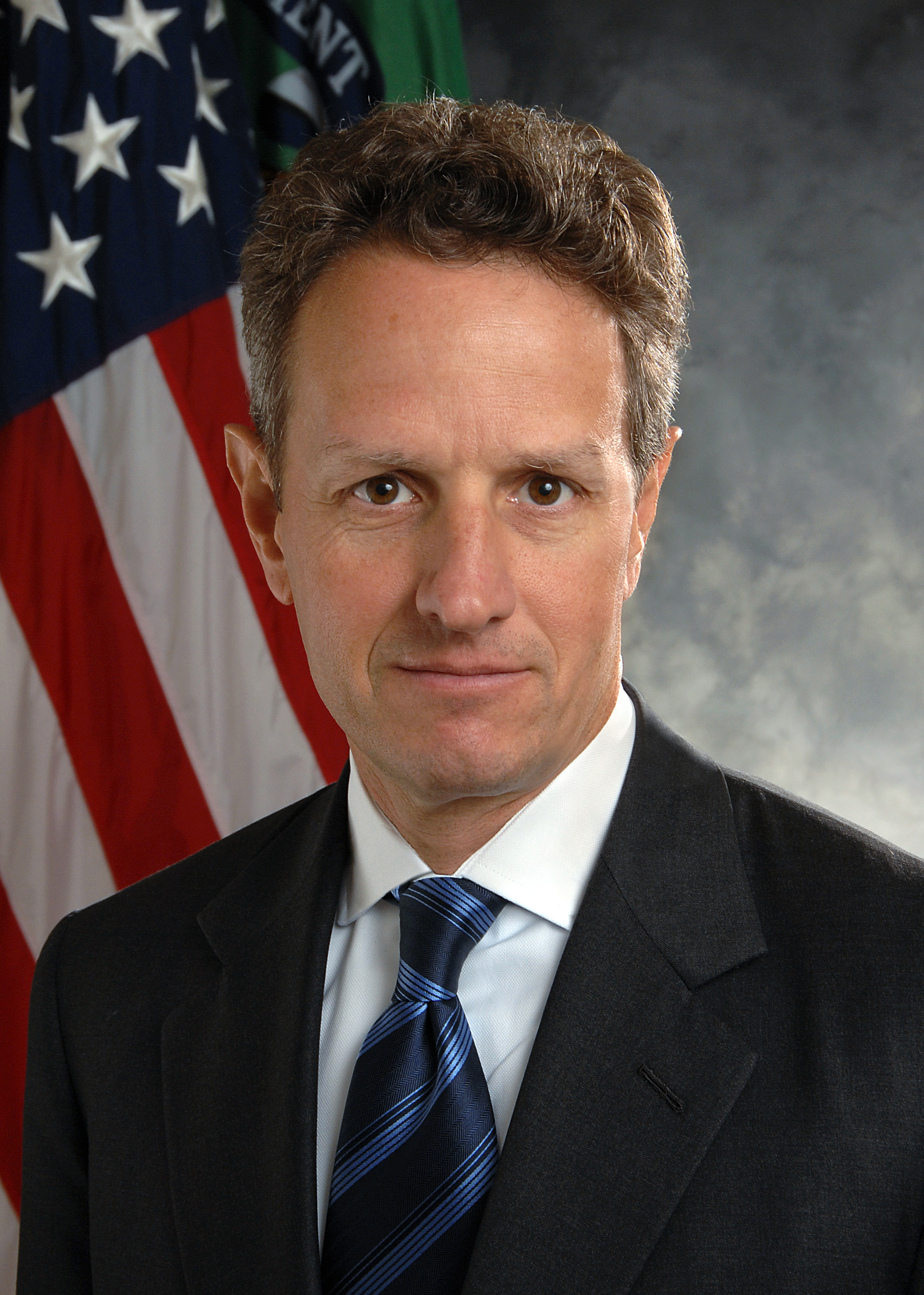
The ninth president of the New York Fed, Timothy Geithner, who subsequently served as Secretary of the Treasury

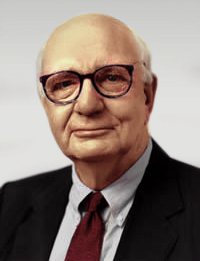
Paul Volcker, the fifth president of the New York Fed and later Chairman of the Federal Reserve

The Federal Reserve Bank of New York (New York Fed) is one of 12 regional reserve banks of the Federal Reserve System, which is the American central bank. It is described as being the most important of the banks, due to it being in the world's center of finance and serving as the Federal Open Market Committee's operating arm. This is also due to its conducting of open market operations and foreign exchange market intervention.

== History ==
The former title for the chief executive officer of the New York Fed was governor and was renamed to president due to the Banking Act of 1935. Akin to all other reserve bank presidents, the president of the New York Fed is nominated by the Board of Directors of the New York Fed and is approved by the Board of Governors of the Federal Reserve System. The Federal Reserve Act states that the president of a Federal Reserve Bank is the chief executive officer of the bank in question and has a term that ends the last day in February in years ending in 1 or 6. Reserve Bank presidents must retire when they reach the age of 65, nevertheless, if the Board of Governors allows, a president who assumed his position after age 55 may serve until they have served 10 years or reached age 70, whichever is attained first. The areas of the bank involved in business report to both the president and first vice president of the New York Fed. They in turn report to the Board of Directors of the New York Fed. The president of the New York Fed is a permanent member of the Federal Open Market Committee, which is responsible for open market operations.

The Federal Reserve Bank of New York has had ten presidents since its inception, of which some have gone on to hold positions in government. Benjamin Strong, Jr., who had been the president of Bankers Trust Company, became the first president of the New York Fed on October 5, 1914. He said the bank at that point "consisted of little more than a copy of the Federal Reserve Act", but it consumed 100 million U.S. dollars from 211 member banks during the course of that day.

Some presidents have gone on to serve in higher offices. President Jimmy Carter appointed former New York Fed President Paul Volcker as Chairman of the Federal Reserve in 1979 and President Ronald Reagan reappointed him in 1983. President Barack Obama later appointed Volcker to be the first Chairman of the President's Economic Recovery Advisory Board in 2009. President Obama also appointed former New York Fed President Timothy Geithner to be the United States Secretary of the Treasury in his first Cabinet.

== Governors and presidents ==
#	Photo	CEO	Life span	Term start	Term end	Ref
Governors
1		Benjamin Strong, Jr.*	1872–1928	October 5, 1914	October 16, 1928	
2		George L. Harrison	1887–1958	November 24, 1928	—	—
Presidents
(2)		George L. Harrison	1887–1958	—	December 31, 1940	
3		Allan Sproul	1896–1978	January 1, 1941	June 30, 1956	
4		Alfred Hayes	1910–1989	August 1, 1956	August 1, 1975	
5		Paul Volcker	1927–2019	August 1, 1975	August 5, 1979	
6		Anthony M. Solomon†	1919–2008	April 1, 1980	December 31, 1984	
7		E. Gerald Corrigan	1941–2022	January 1, 1985	July 19, 1993	
8		William J. McDonough	1934–2018	July 19, 1993	June 10, 2003	
9		Timothy Geithner	1961–	November 17, 2003	January 26, 2009	
10		William C. Dudley	1953–	January 27, 2009	June 18, 2018	
11		John Williams	1962–	June 18, 2018	Incumbent	

*	Died in office
†	Stepped down due to reaching retirement age
