= Benjamin Strong Jr. =

American banker (1872–1928)

Benjamin Strong
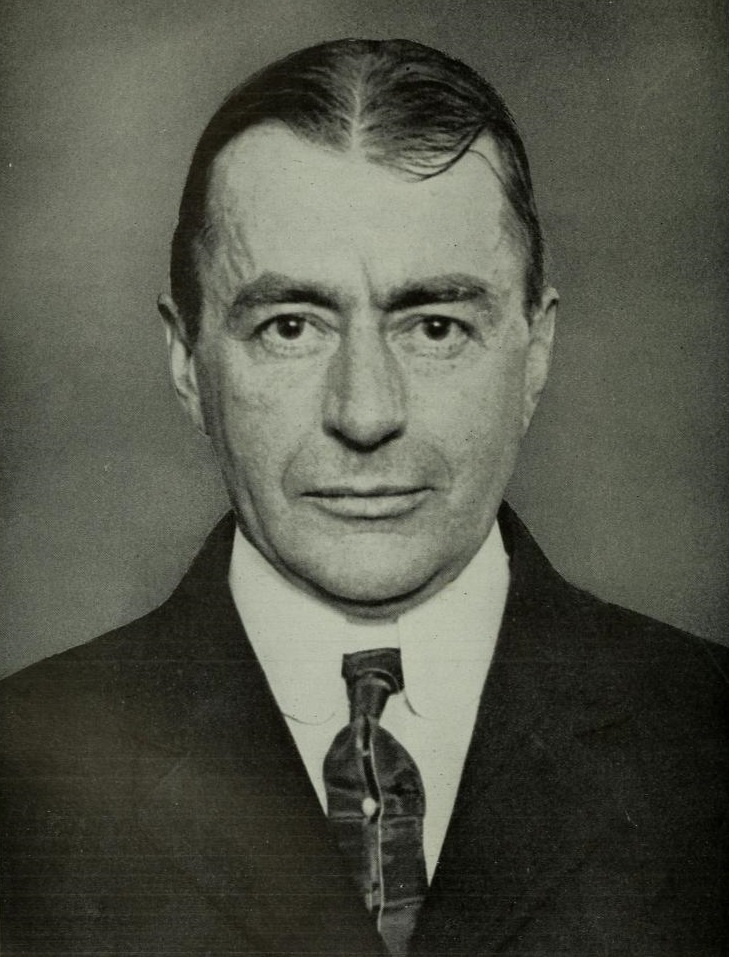

Governor of the Federal Reserve Bank of New York
- In office October 5, 1914 – October 16, 1928
- Preceded by: Position established
- Succeeded by: George L. Harrison

Personal details
- Born: December 22, 1872 Fishkill, New York, U.S.
- Died: October 16, 1928 (aged 55) New York City, New York, U.S.
- Spouse(s): Margaret LeBoutillier (1874–1905) m. 1895; Katherine Converse (1887–1937) m. 1907
- Children: Benjamin Strong (1896–1986); Margaret McIntyre Strong (1898–1906); Philip Grandin Strong (1901–1971); Barbara Strong Leggett (1912–1970)
- Parent(s): Benjamin Strong (1834–1915); Adeline Schenck Strong (1844–1933)

Benjamin Strong Jr. (December 22, 1872 – October 16, 1928) was an American banker. He served as Governor of the Federal Reserve Bank of New York for 14 years until his death. He exerted great influence over the policy and actions of the entire Federal Reserve System and indeed over the financial policies of all of the United States and Europe.

== Early life ==
Strong was born in Fishkill, New York in the Hudson Valley, and was raised in Montclair, New Jersey. His father's family were primarily merchants and bankers, descended from a British immigrant who had arrived in Massachusetts in 1630.

Strong had hopes of attending Princeton University after an older brother, but his family experienced temporary financial difficulties when he graduated from Montclair High School. Strong opted to go to work and became a clerk at a Wall Street investment and financial management firm associated with his father's employer.

== Corporate banking career ==
In 1900, Strong joined a trust company to work as an assistant to a corporate officer and eventually succeeded his boss. A trust company is one that primarily administers the financial matters of legal trusts in which the trust company acts on behalf of others, including both individuals (living or dead) and corporations. Trusts can be set up for many reasons, such as for historic and natural site preservation or for legal heirs too young to manage their own finances. For large corporations, trust companies can act for the corporation's bondholders, including accepting the corporation's payments on the bonds and distributing them to the bondholders. At the time, many commercial banks were forbidden by law to administer trusts; however, trust companies could carry out most commercial bank activities. Commercial banks thus saw trust companies as luring away their customers with the attraction of being able to accomplish both commercial and trust activities at one company.

In 1904, Strong moved to Bankers Trust, which had been founded the year before by a consortium of commercial banks on the premise that it would not lure commercial bank customers away. In addition to offering the usual trust and commercial banking functions, it also acted as a "bankers' bank" by holding the reserves of other banks and trust companies and loaning them money when they needed additional reserves due to unexpected withdrawals. Bankers Trust quickly grew to be the second largest US trust company and a dominant Wall Street institution. Despite technically having numerous stockholders, the voting power was held by three associates of J.P. Morgan. Thus, it was widely viewed as a Morgan company. During the Panic of 1907, Bankers Trust, including Strong, worked closely with J.P. Morgan to help avoid a general financial collapse by lending money to sound banks.

Strong became a vice-president of Bankers Trust in 1909 and then its president in January 1914.

== Aldrich Plan and Federal Reserve Act ==
The experience of working with Morgan to alleviate the effects of the Panic of 1907 made Strong an ardent advocate of banking reform because he realized that the voluntary cooperation organized by Morgan was not an adequate means of preventing or dealing with banking crises. He was not the only one worried since a great public debate ensued after the panic about banking and financial reform. Even sound banks had problems because their depositors demanded their money, causing the banks to run low on cash and gold. The US public had been previously opposed to the establishment of a central bank, but many leading bankers urged the US Congress to create a central bank that could help sound banks meet the demands of their depositors during a bank run by temporarily lending them money.

In 1908, Congress established the National Monetary Commission to evaluate viable alternatives for a long-term solution to the cycles of financial boom and bust. At the time, Republicans dominated Congress. The chair of the committee was a leading Senate Republican, Nelson Aldrich of Rhode Island. (Nelson Rockefeller was named after Aldrich, his maternal grandfather.)

Strong was one of those selected to attend a secret ten-day conference at the luxurious Jekyll Island Hunt Club retreat in November 1910. Also in attendance were Aldrich, chair of the National Monetary Commission; A. Piatt Andrew, Assistant Secretary of the Treasury and Special Assistant to the National Monetary Commission (the only other commission member besides Aldrich); Paul Warburg, a recent immigrant from a prominent German banking family who was a partner in the New York banking house of Kuhn, Loeb & Co.; Frank A. Vanderlip, president of the National City Bank of New York; Henry P. Davison, senior partner of J.P. Morgan & Co.; and Charles D. Norton, president of the Morgan-dominated First National Bank of New York.

What came to be known as the Aldrich Plan was drafted by these men during the conference. The plan was written in secrecy, as the public would never approve of a banking reform bill written by bankers, much less of a plan for a central bank. In addition, the bankers involved were prominent New York City bankers. The US public had been anti-banker since the Panic of 1907, and New York City bankers were particularly distrusted in the West and the South. Thus, members of Congress from these states would find it hard to support a plan drawn up by New York City bankers. The Aldrich Plan carefully avoided calling its proposed new organization a "central bank" in the hope of reducing concerns about central control. Warburg and others had warned against that. It instead carefully worded its proposal as the establishment of a National Reserve Association. The bankers' plan, but not its origin, was publicized on January 16, 1911, as the Aldrich Plan, which was submitted to Congress on January 9, 1912. However, it was not popular among those who wanted a public-controlled plan or who opposed the concept of a central bank in any form. Thus, it was followed by much debate but never came to a vote.

In the November 1912 elections, Democrats won in a national landslide with Woodrow Wilson elected as president, and the party gaining control of both houses of Congress. The platform favored a public-controlled plan. Thus, the Aldrich banker-controlled plan was effectively dead.

Wilson made the issue one of his top priorities even before he took office. He asked Carter Glass of Virginia, one of the leading Democratic representatives on the House Committee on Banking and Currency, to work with banking experts and develop a compromise bill. Glass worked with Robert Latham Owen, and they introduced the Glass-Owens bill in December 1912. To implement the Democrats' desire for a public-controlled plan, the bill proposed a central public-appointed body in control. To address the Western and Southern distrust about powerful New York City banks, the bill decentralized the system into districts to limit the power of the New York City banks. However, the bill also had many features of the banker-controlled plan to broaden its political appeal. Thus, the general outline of the Aldrich Plan eventually served as the model upon which the Federal Reserve System was based, but there were significant changes. A degree of public control was exerted via the Federal Reserve Board, the equivalent of today's Board of Governors, selected by the US president. Also, the role of professional bankers was, to some extent, limited by confining their overt control to the operation of the Federal Reserve banks of the various regions. The Aldrich Plan met with Warburg's satisfaction, as he said that minor changes could be adjusted administratively later.

After much debate, Congress passed this bill, with some minor modifications, as the Federal Reserve Act on December 23, 1913.

== Federal Reserve career ==
Strong had concerns about the Federal Reserve Act and campaigned for changes because of the alterations made from the original Aldrich Plan. His concerns included the following:

- The political appointees of the central board would not necessarily have banking knowledge and expertise
- The district banks operated virtually independently of the central board and thus there was no effective central control, which Strong argued simply perpetuated the "fragmentation and diffusion of authority that had so bedeviled American banking and would only lead to conflict and confusion."

With the formation of the Federal Reserve System in November 1914, Strong was persuaded (despite his reservations) to become the executive officer (then called the "governor"; today the term would be "president") of the Federal Reserve Bank of New York. As the leader of the Federal Reserve's largest and most powerful district bank, Strong became a dominant force in US monetary and banking affairs. One biographer has termed him the "de facto leader of the entire Federal Reserve System." That was not only because of Strong's abilities but also because the central board's powers were ambiguous and, for the most part, limited to supervisory and regulatory functions under the 1913 Federal Reserve Act because so many Americans were antagonistic to centralized control.

When the United States entered World War I, Strong was a major force behind the campaigns to fund the war effort via bonds owned primarily by US citizens, which enabled the country to avoid many of the postwar financial problems of the European belligerents. Strong gradually recognized the importance of open market operation, or the purchases and sales of government securities, as a means of managing the quantity of money in the US economy and thus affecting interest rates. That was particularly important at the time because gold had flooded into the United States during and after the war. Thus, its gold-backed currency was well-protected, but prices had been pushed up substantially by the currency expansion due to the gold standard-imposed expansion of currency. In 1922, Strong unofficially scrapped the gold standard and instead began aggressively pursuing open market operations as a means of stabilizing domestic prices and thus internal economic stability. Thus, he began the Federal Reserve's practice of buying and selling government securities as monetary policy. John Maynard Keynes, a prominent British economist who had previously not questioned the gold standard, used Strong's activities as an example of how a central bank could manage a nation's economy without the gold standard in his book "A Tract on Monetary Reform" (1923). To quote one authority, "It was Strong more than anyone else who invented the modern central banker. When we watch... [central bankers of today] describe how they are seeking to strike the right balance between economic growth and price stability, it is the ghost of Benjamin Strong who hovers above him. It all sounds quite prosaically obvious now, but in 1922 it was a radical departure from more than two hundred years of central banking history." His policy of maintaining price levels during the 1920s by open market operation and his willingness to maintain the liquidity of banks during panics have been praised by monetarists and harshly criticized by Austrian economists.

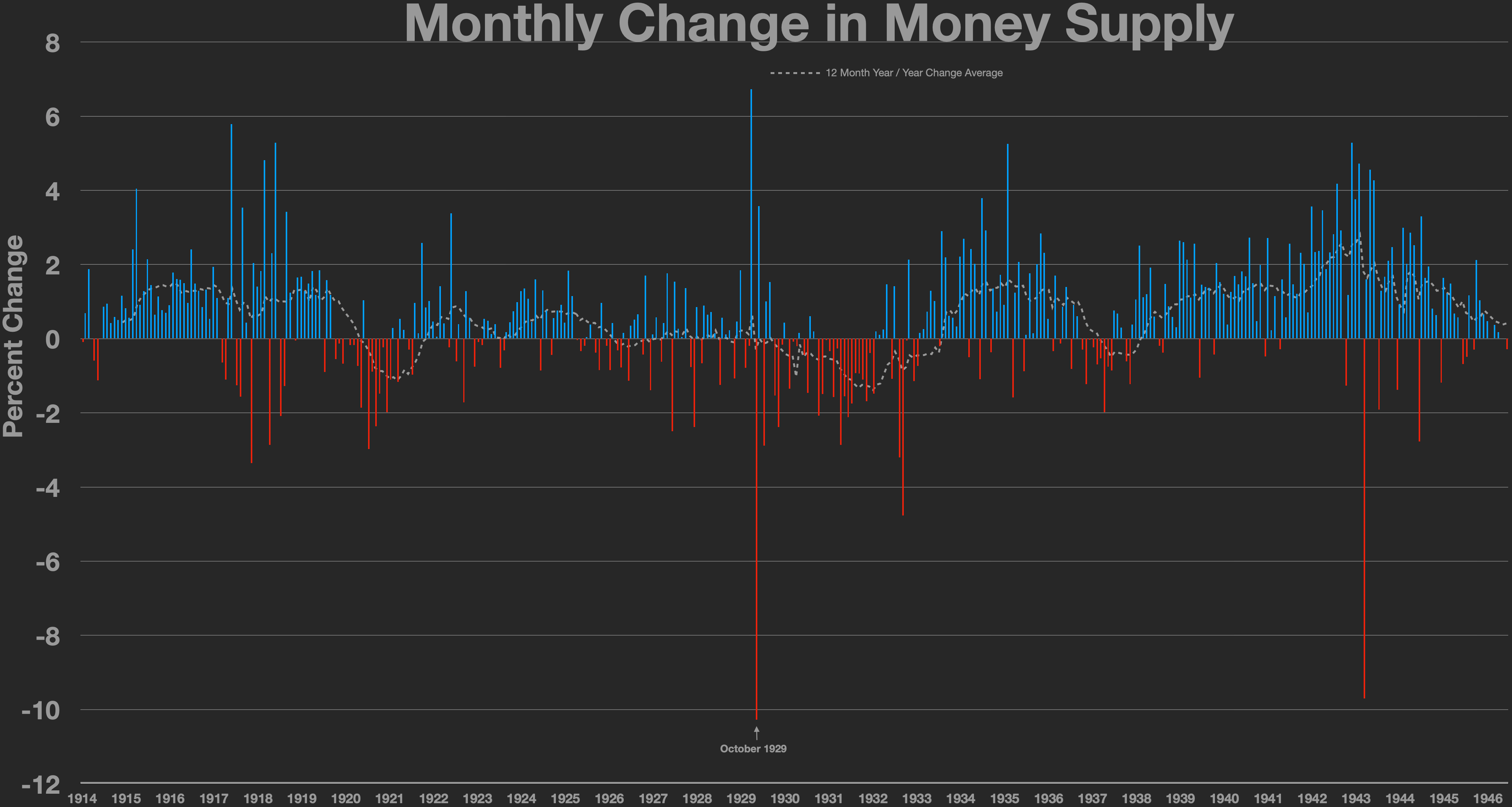
Total money supply contracted -10.28% in October 1929 a year after Strong's death, monetary policy became very volatile after his death.

With the European economic turmoil of the 1920s, Strong's influence became worldwide. He was a strong supporter of European efforts to return to the gold standard and economic stability. Strong's new monetary policies stabilized US prices and encouraged both US and world trade by helping to stabilize European currencies and finances. However, with virtually no inflation, interest rates were low and the US economy and corporate profits surged, fueling the stock market increases of the late 1920s. That worried him, but he also felt he had no choice because the low interest rates were helping the Europeans (particularly the British) in their effort to return to the gold standard. He earned the scorn of some congressional leaders who believed that he was too Eurocentric.

The economic historian Charles P. Kindleberger states that Strong was one of the few US policymakers interested in the troubled financial affairs of Europe in the 1920s and that had he not died in 1928, just a year before the Great Depression, he might have been able to maintain stability in the international financial system. However, the economist Murray Rothbard claimed that it was Strong's manipulations that caused the Depression in the first place. The author Bill Bryson specifically claims that Strong's insistence on cutting the Fed's discount rate 0.5% in 1927, made US President Herbert Hoover furious, fueled the market bubble of 1928, and led to the disastrous market collapse in 1929.

Strong was diagnosed with tuberculosis in 1916 and struggled with the disease and its complications for the remainder of his life. On October 6, 1928, at the New York Hospital, he underwent surgery for an abscess for diverticulitis and spent a week recovering when he suffered a relapse, resulting in his death at 55.

== Personal life ==
He was married twice:

- Margaret LeBoutillier: They married around 1896 and had four children: Benjamin III, Philip, Margaret, and Katherine. Margaret passed away in 1905.
- Katherine Peabody Converse: They married around 1907 and had a daughter named Barbara.

At the time of his death in 1928, he was survived by four of his children.

Other offices
New office	President of the Federal Reserve Bank of New York; 1914–1928	Succeeded by George L. Harrison
