= Anthony M. Solomon =

American economist (1919–2008)

Anthony Solomon

President of the Federal Reserve Bank of New York
- In office January 21, 1980 – December 31, 1984
- Preceded by: Paul Volcker
- Succeeded by: E. Gerald Corrigan

8th Assistant Secretary of State for Economic Affairs
- In office 1965–1969
- Preceded by: Gove Griffith Johnson Jr.
- Succeeded by: Philip H. Trezise

Personal details
- Born: Anthony Morton Solomon; December 27, 1919 Arlington, New Jersey, U.S.
- Died: January 15, 2008 (aged 88) New York City, New York, U.S.
- Spouse: Constance Kaufman
- Education: University of Chicago (BA); Harvard University (MA, PhD)

Anthony Morton Solomon (December 27, 1919 – January 15, 2008) was Undersecretary of the Treasury for Monetary Affairs during the Carter administration, and President of the Federal Reserve Bank of New York between 1980 and 1984.

== Early life and education ==
Born in Arlington, New Jersey, Solomon was educated at the University of Chicago, receiving a B.A. in economics in 1941. He later received his master's degree and doctorate degrees from Harvard University in, respectively, 1948 and 1950.

== Career ==
Solomon's affiliation with government service began with an appointment by President Franklin Roosevelt to be a consultant on economic affairs in Iran. When he was drafted into the Army, a letter from the President's office excused him. Under John F. Kennedy he headed an economic group scouting the Trust Territory of Micronesia in the early 1960s.

Solomon served as Assistant Secretary of State for Economic Affairs in the Johnson administration between 1965 and 1969, and again as Undersecretary of the Treasury for Monetary Affairs from 1977 to 1980. During the Carter administration he helped organize the freezing of Iranian assets following Ayatollah Ruhollah Khomeini's overthrow of Shah Mohammad Reza Pahlavi.

He was appointed President of the Federal Reserve Bank of New York on January 21, 1980.

== Personal life ==
In 1950, Solomon married Constance Kaufman. They moved to Mexico, where Solomon started a food company that sold dehydrated soups. The company was bought by General Foods nine years later. They had a son, Adam, and two daughters, Adele and Tracy. Their son Adam Sanders Solomon (1952–2008) was a vice president for corporate finance at Salomon Brothers and was married to Eve Slater, a physician who served as Assistant Secretary for Health from 2002 to 2003.

Solomon was a major donor to the Peterson Institute in 2006. He died of kidney failure on January 18, 2008.

Other offices
Preceded by Paul Volcker	President of the Federal Reserve Bank of New York; 1980–1984	Succeeded by E. Gerald Corrigan
