= Carmen Segarra =

Carmen Segarra was a US New York Federal Reserve–appointed regulator to Goldman Sachs for seven months from October 2011. She discovered that Goldman Sachs did not have any policy on conflict of interest when it advised El Paso Corporation on selling itself to Kinder Morgan, a company in which Goldman Sachs owned a US$4 billion stake, and with several former Goldman Sachs employees who had previously worked for Kinder Morgan on the El Paso team. She was pressured by her superiors at the Federal Reserve to alter her report, but stated that her professional view of the situation did not change, and refused to do so. She was dismissed shortly after.

Segarra filed suit against the Federal Reserve in the United States District Court for the Southern District of New York, alleging that she was terminated due to reporting to her superiors that the Goldman Sachs Group did not have a firmwide conflict-of-interest policy. Segarra alleged that her termination violated the whistleblower protection provisions of the Federal Deposit Insurance Act, 12 U.S.C. § 1831j. Also included as defendants were Jonathan Kim, Segarra's supervisor, and two employees who were responsible for managing the relationship between Goldman and the Federal Reserve. The case was dismissed because Segarra "failed to allege that she was terminated because she 'reported' violations of anything other than SR 08-08." (Emphasis in original.) Because SR 08-08 is an advisory letter and does not carry the force of law, the court found, an allegation that she was fired for reporting its violation did not entitle Segarra to bring a claim under the whistleblower protection provision of 12 U.S.C. § 1831j. Segarra also brought several state law claims, but the court declined to exercise jurisdiction over the claims once it found that there could be no claim under the Federal Deposit Insurance Act.

Segarra appealed the district court's dismissal to the United States Court of Appeals for the Second Circuit in May 2014. Her brief was filed on December 9, 2014, and defendant-appellees reply brief is due December 30, 2014.

After her dismissal, Segarra in September 2014 released audio recordings about another issue in which the Federal Reserve did not properly regulate Goldman Sachs. After the European Banking Authority required European banks to increase their capital holdings to make them more robust to shocks, Spanish Santander Bank arranged for Goldman to hold some of its shares in its Brazilian subsidiary for some years, for a payment of about $40 million, a practice that was considered by Federal Reserve to be "legal but shady." Segarra said that she had pointed out that there was a requirement, which was not followed, for Goldman to check that the FR had no objection to the terms. Opinions were published about the ineffectual behaviour of a government agency supposed to hold to account an organisation, rather than make minor criticism but take no action on being presented with disturbing or threatening information. Excerpts of the recordings were featured in a lengthy report on the radio show This American Life.

She graduated from Harvard College, Columbia University, and Cornell Law School.

== See also ==
- Regulatory capture
