= Mark H. Willes =

Mark Willes

President of the Federal Reserve Bank of Minneapolis
- In office April 16, 1977 – June 30, 1980
- Preceded by: Bruce MacLaury
- Succeeded by: Gary H. Stern

Personal details
- Born: Mark Hinckley Willes; July 16, 1941 (age 85) Salt Lake City, Utah, U.S.
- Education: Columbia University (BA, MA, PhD)

Mark Hinckley Willes (born July 16, 1941) is a business leader who was most recently the chief executive officer of Deseret Management Corporation from 2009 to 2012.

== Early life and education ==
Willes was born in Salt Lake City, Utah, to Joseph S. Willes and Ruth Hinckley. His mother was a sister of Gordon B. Hinckley, the 15th president of the Church of Jesus Christ of Latter-day Saints (LDS Church). Willes graduated from West High School in Salt Lake City. He received a bachelor's degree and Ph.D. from Columbia University. Monetary policy was the focus of his dissertation.

== Career ==
After graduating from Columbia, he worked for the Banking and Currency Committee of the US House of Representatives as a research economist. Next Willes became a professor at the Wharton School of Business and a researcher with the Philadelphia Branch of the Federal Reserve Bank. In 1967 he left Wharton to become a consulting economist at the Philadelphia Federal Reserve.

Willes served a term as president of the Federal Reserve Bank of Minneapolis from 1977 to 1980. While in this position he pushed for researchers to examine rational expectations theory. He also was often a dissenting vote in meetings of the Fed's Federal Open Market Committee.

In 1980 he joined General Mills as chief financial officer, and later served as president, Chief Operating Officer, and vice chairman of the Board of Directors. For his cost-cutting and elimination of many jobs, he was widely dubbed "The Cereal Killer".

Willes was CEO of Times Mirror Company from 1995 to 2000. He took over a company that in its central property, the Los Angeles Times (Times), had been struggling through downsizing and declines since the start of 1990. In 1997, Willes took on the additional duty of being publisher of the Times. In this position he tried to expand the newspaper's outreach by starting a section aimed at Latino readers. At the same time, he cut staffing and the extent of international coverage. Willes also pushed to end the wall of separation between the business and news sides of the newspaper. He majorly increased the level of profits of the Times while he ran it.

After the Tribune Company purchased Times Mirror, Willes retired. He then worked for about a year as a business professor at Brigham Young University (BYU). He then served from 2001 to 2004 as president of the LDS Church's Hawaii Honolulu Mission. Beginning in 2005, Willes served as chairman of the board of the Polynesian Cultural Center, having first became a member of the board in 1996. He was a major donor to the construction of the canoe learning compound. BYU-Hawaii renamed their Center for International Entrepreneurship as the Mark and Laura Willes Center for International Entrepreneurship.

Willes donated to BYU's Neal A. Maxwell Center for Religious Scholarship, which led to the 2007 establishment of the Laura F. Willes Center for Book of Mormon Studies, as part of the center.

== Personal life ==
Willes is a member of LDS Church. Willes served for almost a decade as president of the church's Minneapolis Minnesota Stake. Willes and his wife, Laura, are the parents of five children.
