= Paul Volcker =

American economist (1927–2019)

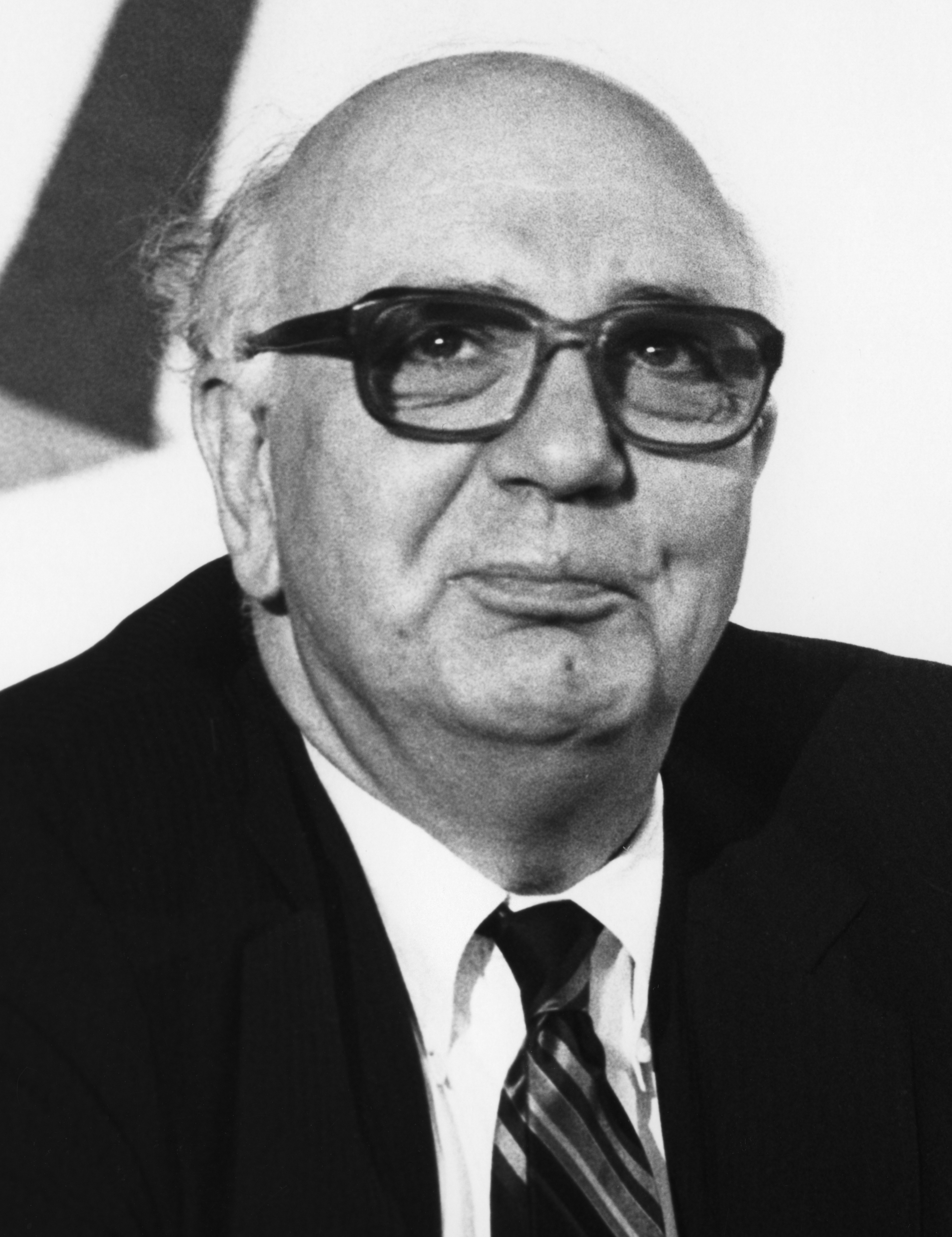
- Volcker in 1989

Chair of the President's Economic Recovery Advisory Board
- In office February 6, 2009 – February 6, 2011
- President: Barack Obama
- Preceded by: Position established
- Succeeded by: Jeffrey R. Immelt (Council on Jobs and Competitiveness)

12th Chair of the Federal Reserve
- In office August 6, 1979 – August 11, 1987
- President: Jimmy Carter; Ronald Reagan
- Deputy: Frederick H. Schultz; Preston Martin; Manuel H. Johnson
- Preceded by: G. William Miller
- Succeeded by: Alan Greenspan

Member of the Federal Reserve Board of Governors
- In office August 6, 1979 – August 11, 1987
- President: Jimmy Carter; Ronald Reagan
- Preceded by: William Miller
- Succeeded by: Alan Greenspan

President of the Federal Reserve Bank of New York
- In office May 2, 1975 – August 5, 1979
- Preceded by: Alfred Hayes
- Succeeded by: Anthony M. Solomon

Personal details
- Born: Paul Adolph Volcker Jr. September 5, 1927 Cape May, New Jersey, U.S.
- Died: December 8, 2019 (aged 92) New York City, New York, U.S.
- Party: Democratic
- Spouses: Barbara Bahnson (m. 1954; died 1998); Anke Dening (m. 2010)
- Children: 2
- Education: Princeton University (BA); Harvard University (MA); London School of Economics (attended)

Paul Adolph Volcker Jr. (September 5, 1927 – December 8, 2019) was an American economist who served as the 12th chairperson of the Federal Reserve from 1979 to 1987. During his tenure as chairman, Volcker was widely credited with having ended the high levels of inflation seen in the United States throughout the 1970s and early 1980s, with measures known as the "Volcker shock". He previously served as the president of the Federal Reserve Bank of New York from 1975 to 1979.

President Jimmy Carter nominated him to succeed G. William Miller as Fed chairman and President Ronald Reagan renominated him once. Volcker did not seek a third term at the Fed and was succeeded by Alan Greenspan. After his retirement from the Board, he chaired the Economic Recovery Advisory Board under President Barack Obama from 2009 to 2011 during the subprime mortgage crisis.

== Early life and education ==
Volcker was born in Cape May, New Jersey, the son of Alma Louise (née Klippel, 1892–1990) and Paul Adolph Volcker (1889–1960). All his grandparents were of ethnic German origin. Volcker grew up in Teaneck, New Jersey, where his father was the township's first municipal manager. Paul Sr. thrived in the role for 20 years as he improved the burgeoning town's economic stability and the local government's effectiveness. Paul Jr. had four older sisters: Ruth (1916–1991), Louise (1918–1966), Elinor (1922–1923) and Virginia Streitfeld (1924–2011). As a child, he attended his mother's Lutheran church, while his father went to an Episcopal church. Volcker graduated from Teaneck High School in 1945, where he participated in several student groups and impressed his peers and teachers with his knowledge of politics.

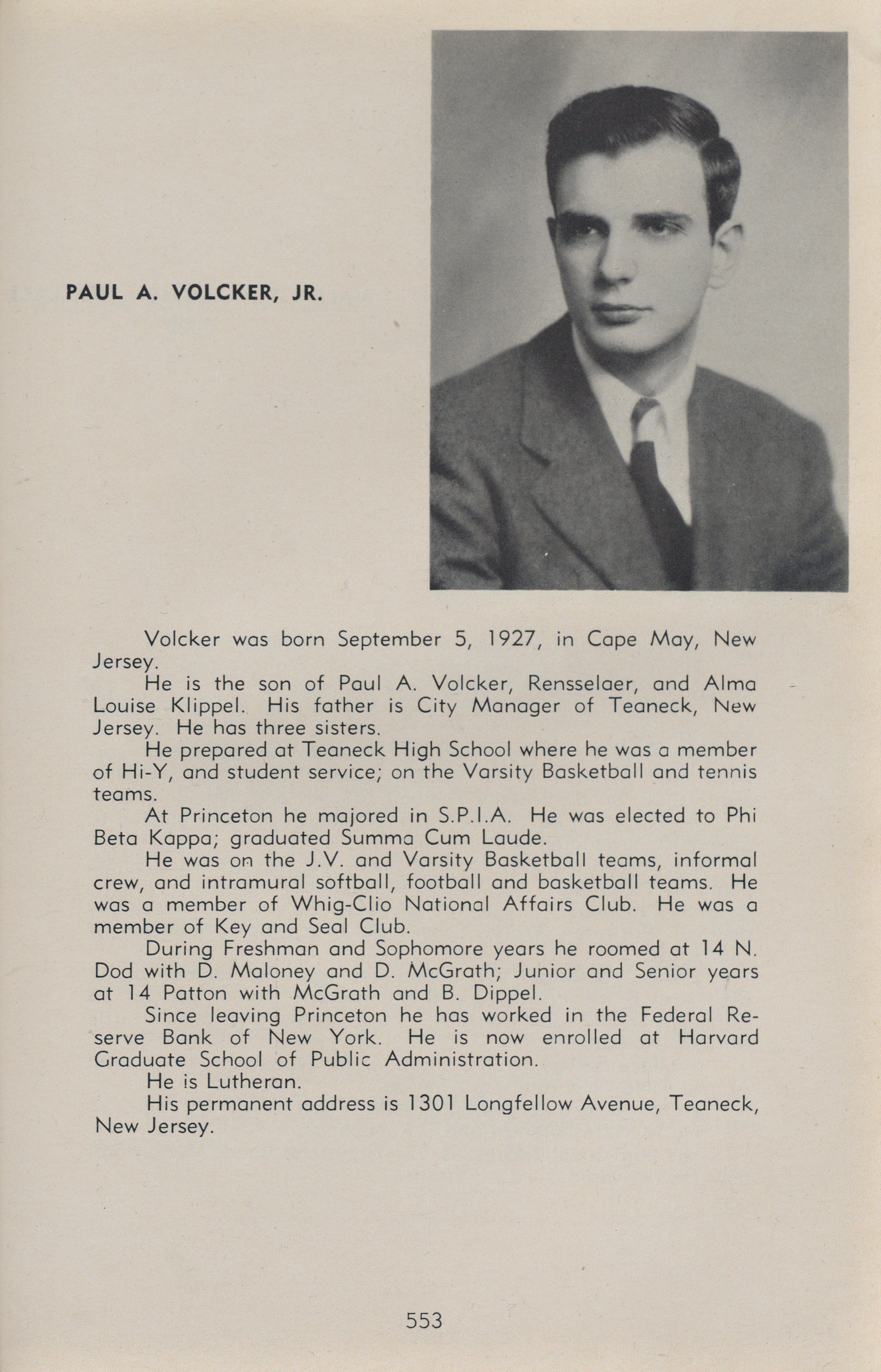
Volcker in the Princeton University yearbook, 1949

Volcker attended Princeton University as an undergraduate student and graduated with highest honors from the Woodrow Wilson School of Public and International Affairs (now the Princeton School of Public and International Affairs) in 1949. In his senior thesis, titled "The Problems of Federal Reserve Policy since World War II", Volcker criticized the Federal Reserve's post-WWII policies for failing to curb inflationary pressures, writing, "a swollen money supply presented a grave inflationary threat to the economy. There was a need to bring this money supply under control if the disastrous effects of a sharp price rise were to be avoided." Following a summer as a research assistant at the Federal Reserve Bank of New York, he moved to Harvard University to earn an M.A. in political economy from its Graduate School of Arts and Sciences and Graduate School of Public Administration. He worked a second summer as a New York Fed research assistant before graduating in 1951. After Harvard, Volcker attended the London School of Economics from 1951 to 1952 as a Rotary Foundation Ambassadorial Fellow under Rotary's Ambassadorial Scholarships program.

== Career ==
In 1952, Volcker joined the staff of the Federal Reserve Bank of New York as a full-time economist. He left that position in 1957 to become a financial economist with the Chase Manhattan Bank. In 1962, Robert Roosa, who had been his mentor at the Federal Reserve, hired him at the Treasury Department as director of financial analysis. In 1963, he became deputy under secretary for monetary affairs. He returned to Chase Manhattan Bank as vice president and director of planning in 1965.

Appointed by the Nixon Administration, Volcker served under secretary of the Treasury for international monetary affairs from 1969 to 1974. He played an important role in President Richard Nixon's decision to suspend the dollar's convertibility into gold on August 15, 1971, which resulted in the collapse of the Bretton Woods system. Volcker considered the suspension of gold convertibility "the most significant single event" of his career." Because of his position as under secretary, Volcker served as a board member for OPIC and Fannie Mae. Across the policies he worked on, he acted as a moderating influence on policy, advocating the pursuit of an international solution to monetary problems and acting as a negotiator with other nations' policymakers. After leaving the U.S. Treasury, he spent a year as a senior fellow at Princeton's Woodrow Wilson School (his alma mater). In 1975, he became President of the Federal Reserve Bank of New York, and he retained that role until he became Federal Reserve Chairman in August 1979.

=== Chairman of the Federal Reserve ===
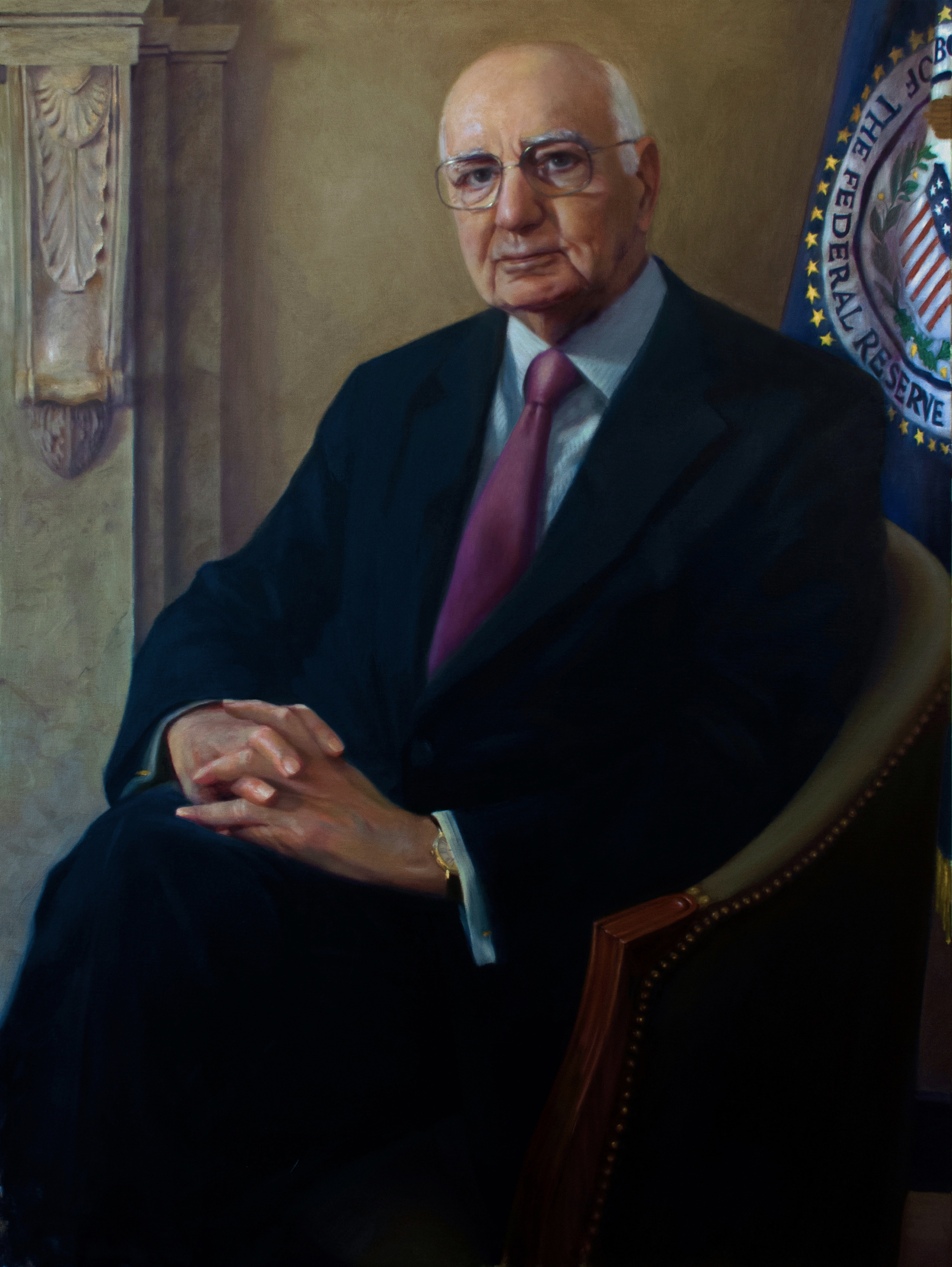
Portrait of Paul A. Volcker by Luis Alvarez Roure

After G. William Miller's confirmation as Secretary of the Treasury, President Jimmy Carter's confirmation of Vice Chairman of the Federal Reserve Frederick H. Schultz's role as Acting Chairman sent markets panicking. Carter resultingly sought a reassuring, qualified nominee who would confront inflation head-on, and nominated Paul Volcker to serve as chairman of the Board of Governors of the Federal Reserve System on July 25, 1979. He was confirmed by the U.S. Senate on August 2, 1979, and took office on August 6, 1979. President Ronald Reagan renominated Volcker to a second term in 1983.

Inflation emerged as an economic and political challenge in the United States during the 1970s. The monetary policies of the Federal Reserve board, led by Volcker, were widely credited with curbing the rate of inflation and expectations that inflation would continue. US inflation, which peaked at 14.8 percent in March 1980, fell below 3 percent by 1983. The Federal Reserve board led by Volcker raised the federal funds rate, which had averaged 11.2% in 1979, to a peak of 20% in June 1981. The prime rate rose to 21.5% in 1981 as well, which helped lead to the 1980–1982 recession, in which the national unemployment rate rose to over 10%. In addition to the rises in key interest rates, the so-called 'Volcker shock' included monetarist-inspired policies, such as targeting the money supply. Despite the fact that monetarist economists did not recognize Volcker policies to be totally monetarist, some members of the Federal Open Market Committee (FOMC) claimed to follow monetarist principles.

Volcker's Federal Reserve board elicited the strongest political attacks and most widespread protests in the history of the Federal Reserve (unlike any protests experienced since 1922), due to the effects of high interest rates on the construction, farming, and industrial sectors, culminating in indebted farmers driving their tractors onto C Street NW in Washington, D.C. and blockading the Eccles Building. Aggrieved homebuilders mailed the Fed pieces of 2x4 lumber in protest. The 'Volcker shock' also entailed strong disturbances within the European Monetary System and has therefore been deeply criticized in Europe. US monetary policy eased in 1982, helping lead to a resumption of economic growth.

In July 1984, Volcker was summoned to a meeting with President Reagan and then White House Chief of Staff James Baker. In the meeting, Baker ordered him not to raise rates in the lead-up to the 1984 presidential election. Volcker wrote in his memoir that he was "stunned," but since he had not intended to raise rates and felt the White House wouldn't publicize it, he did not speak of the meeting to the press.

The US account was in permanent deficit by the 1990s. Volcker himself tried to remedy the situation by the Plaza Accord in 1985, which called for Germany and Japan to revalue relative to the US dollar. The combination of the Fed's tight money policies and the expansive fiscal policy of the Reagan Administration (large tax cuts and a major increase in military spending) produced large federal budget deficits and significant macroeconomic imbalances in the U.S. economy. The combination of growing federal debt and high interest rates led to a substantial rise in federal net interest costs. The sharp rise of interest costs and large deficits led Congress to take some steps towards fiscal constraint. Nobel laureate Joseph Stiglitz said about him in an interview:

Paul Volcker, the previous Fed Chairman known for keeping inflation under control, was fired because the Reagan administration didn't believe he was an adequate de-regulator.

This statement by Joseph Stiglitz is technically inaccurate, as the “firing” was simply neither nominating nor appointing Paul Volcker for another term, unlike Ronald Regan’s actual firing of the air traffic controllers. Congressman Ron Paul, well known as a harsh critic of the Federal Reserve, offered qualified praise of Volcker:

Being in Congress in the late 1970s and early 1980s and serving on the House Banking Committee, I met and got to question several Federal Reserve chairmen: Arthur Burns, G. William Miller, and Paul Volcker. Of the three, I had the most interaction with Volcker. He was more personable and smarter than the others, including the more recent board chairmen Alan Greenspan and Ben Bernanke.

In 1983, Volcker received the U.S. Senator John Heinz Award for Greatest Public Service by an Elected or Appointed Official, an award given out annually by Jefferson Awards.

== Post–Federal Reserve ==
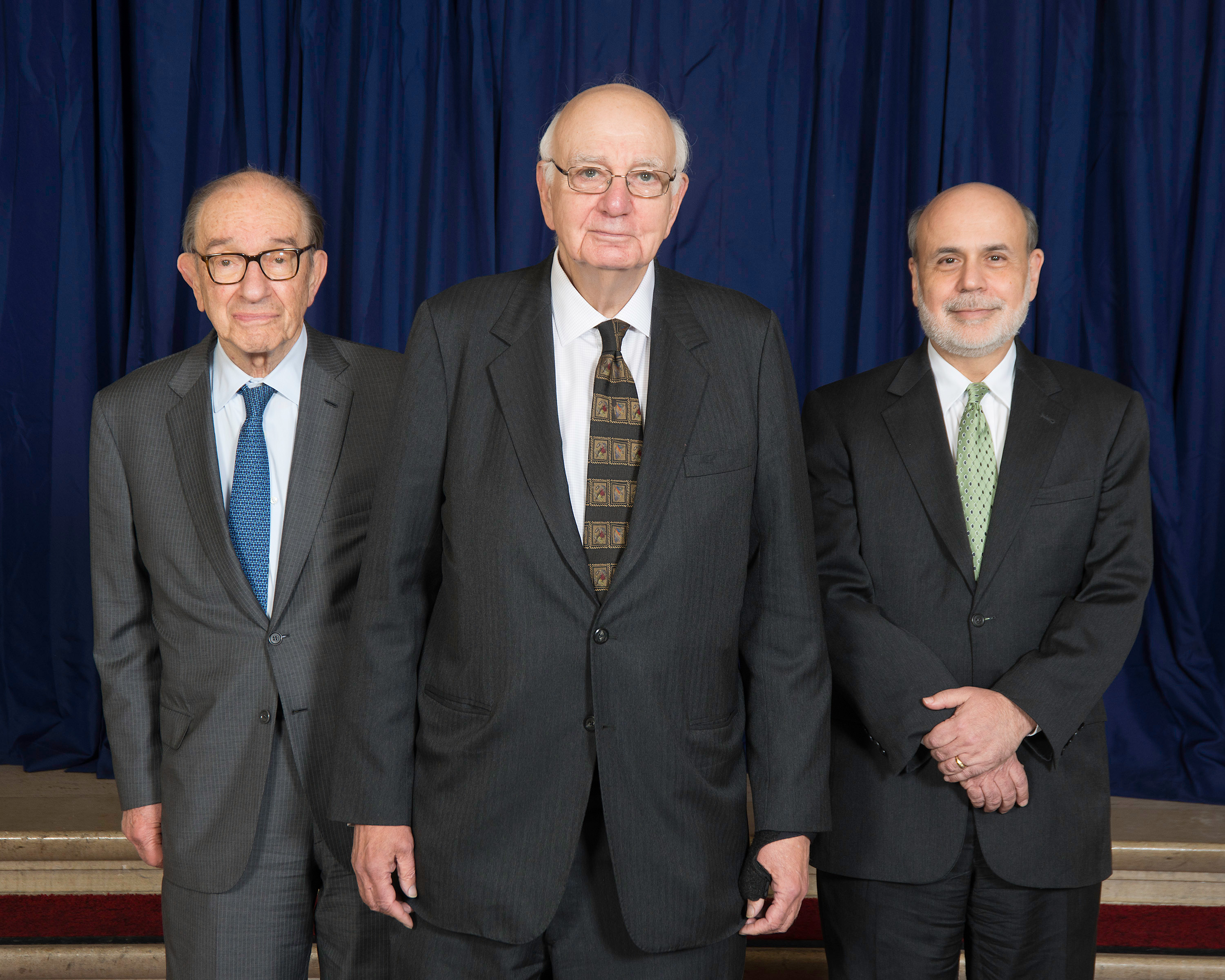
Volcker in 2014 with Alan Greenspan and Ben Bernanke

After leaving the Federal Reserve in 1987, he became chairman of the prominent New York investment banking firm, Wolfensohn & Co., a corporate advisory and investment firm run by James D. Wolfensohn (who later became President of the World Bank). In 1992, Volcker was elected to the American Academy of Arts and Sciences. In 1993 he chaired the Group of 30 Report on the Derivatives market entitled "Derivatives: Practices and Principles" with several appendices and a survey on how practices may have changed since the original 1993 report. The Group of 30 is a "consultative group on international economic and monetary affairs". Volcker was their Chairman emeritus.

In 1996, Volcker took up the chair of the Independent Committee of Eminent Persons (Volcker Commission) to look into the dormant accounts of Jewish victims of the Holocaust lying in Swiss banks. This included a "massive accounting of Swiss bank records". In the midst of a contentious process (the committee was formed by three Jewish representatives and three representatives of Swiss banks), he was able to bring about an agreement among the parties for a settlement of $1.25 billion. Volcker was elected to the American Philosophical Society in 1992. In 2000, Volcker accepted the Chairmanship of the IFRS Trustees, the not-for-profit funding arm of the International Accounting Standards Board (later the IFRS Foundation). The IFRS Foundation is a private sector enterprise based in London which seeks to develop a single global accounting model, subject to adoption country by country under their rules of law.

In 2001, Volcker joined The Conference Board, an economic and business think-tank based in NY, as a senior advisor supporting research on corporate governance, analysis of business cylcles and economic policy. His activities there primarily focused on guiding the research staff and engaging global business leaders to support The Conference Board's activities promoting free-markets, economic analysis and responsible corporate governance. Other Federal Reserve Chairs affiliated with The Conference Board include Alan Greenspan, who was a researcher there from 1948 to 1953, when it was known as the National Industrial Conference Board. In April 2004, the United Nations assigned Volcker to research possible corruption in the Iraqi Oil for Food program. In the report summarizing its research, Volcker criticized Kojo Annan, son of then-UN Secretary-General Kofi Annan, and the Swiss company Cotecna Inspection SA, Kojo's employer, for trying to conceal their relationship. He concluded in his March 2005, report that "there is no evidence that the selection of Cotecna, in 1998, was subject to improper influence of the Secretary General in the bidding or selection process." While Volcker did not implicate Secretary General Annan in the selection process, he did cast serious doubt on Annan, whose "management performance ... fell short of the standards that the United Nations Organization should strive to maintain". Volcker was a director of the United Nations Association of the United States of America between 2000 and 2004, prior to his being appointed to the Independent Inquiry by Kofi Annan.

As of October 2006, Volcker was the chairman of the board of trustees of the influential Washington-based financial advisory body, the Group of Thirty, and a member of the Trilateral Commission. He had a long association with the Rockefeller family, not only with his positions at Chase Bank and the Trilateral Commission, but also through membership of the trust committee of Rockefeller Group, Inc., which he joined in 1987. That entity managed, at one time, the Rockefeller Center on behalf of the numerous members of the Rockefeller family. He was a chairman and an honorary trustee of International House, the cultural exchange residence and program center in New York City. He was a founding member of the Trilateral Commission and a long-time member of the Bilderberg Group.

In January 2008, Volcker endorsed Democratic Party presidential candidate Barack Obama in the upcoming presidential election. On April 8, 2008, he was the featured speaker at The Economic Club of New York. Volcker discussed "what appears to be in substance a direct transfer of mortgage and mortgage-backed securities of questionable pedigree from an investment bank to the Federal Reserve", and offered his detailed analysis and evaluation of interrelationships among the U.S. capital markets, Federal Reserve policies, and the economy as whole.

Volcker appeared in the Charles Ferguson's movie Inside Job. He was interviewed about current Wall Street CEO pay, claiming it is "excessive". Volcker was an economic advisor to President Barack Obama, heading the President's Economic Recovery Advisory Board. Volcker had also been Obama's first pick as United States Secretary of the Treasury, but he was considered too old. During the financial crisis, Volcker was extremely critical of banks, saying that their response to the financial crisis was inadequate, and that more regulation of banks is called for. Specifically, Volcker called for a break-up of the nation's largest banks, prohibiting deposit-taking institutions from engaging in riskier activities such as proprietary trading, private equity, and hedge fund investments (see Volcker Rule). Volcker left the board when its charter expired on February 6, 2011, without being included in discussions on how the board would be reconstituted.

On January 21, 2010, President Barack Obama proposed bank regulations which he dubbed "The Volcker Rule", in reference to Volcker's aggressive pursuit of these regulations. Volcker appeared with the president at the announcement. The proposed rules would prevent commercial banks from owning and investing in hedge funds and private equity, and limit the trading they do for their own accounts. According to SEC Commissioner Luis A. Aguilar, "[t]he success or failure of the Volcker Rule will depend on the manner in which banking entities comply with the letter and spirit of the rule, and on the willingness of regulators to enforce it." Volcker was known to defy the stereotype of a Wall Street insider. A profile in The Week for February 5, 2010, stated that Volcker does not agree with the conventional wisdom that "financial innovation" is necessary for a healthy economy. In fact, he likes to say, "the only useful banking innovation was the invention of the ATM."

On April 6, 2010, at the New-York Historical Society's Global Economic Panel, Volcker commented that the United States should consider adding a national sales tax similar to the Value Added Tax (VAT) imposed in European countries, stating "If, at the end of the day, we need to raise taxes, we should raise taxes." In 2011, Volcker and former Secretary of State George Shultz authored an article in The Wall Street Journal voicing their opinion that the war on drugs had failed. They did not advocate for the legalization of drugs, but rather for a reexamination of the costs of drug prohibition in the United States. In 2015, Volcker donated his public service papers to Princeton University's Seeley G. Mudd Manuscript Library.

=== World Justice Project ===
Volcker served as an honorary co-chairman for the World Justice Project. The World Justice Project works to lead a global, multi-disciplinary effort to strengthen the rule of law for the development of communities of opportunity and equity.

=== Volcker Alliance ===
In 2013, Volcker founded the nonprofit organization the Volcker Alliance to address the challenge of effective execution of public policies and to rebuild public trust in government. The nonpartisan Alliance works toward that objective by partnering with other organizations—academic, business, governmental, and public interest—to strengthen professional education for public service, conduct needed research on government performance, and improve the efficiency and accountability of governmental organization at the federal, state, and local levels.

=== Committee for a Responsible Federal Budget ===
Volcker served on the board of directors of the Committee for a Responsible Federal Budget. The nonpartisan organization is "committed to educating the public on issues with significant fiscal policy impact".

== Personal life ==
Volcker married Barbara Bahnson, the daughter of a physician, on September 11, 1954. They had two children, Janice, a nurse and a Georgetown University graduate, and James, a research assistant and a New York University graduate who was born with cerebral palsy. They also had four grandchildren. His younger sister died young, and two of his three older sisters, Louise and Ruth, never married. His other older sister, Virginia, was married to and divorced from Harold Streitfeld; they have five children.

Volcker was an avid fly-fisherman, who recounted in 1987, "The greatest strategic error of my adult life was to take my wife to Maine on our honeymoon on a fly-fishing trip." Volcker was known as "Tall Paul" for his height of 6 feet 7 inches (2.01 m), standing exactly a foot (30 cm) taller than his first wife, Barbara, when they first met. She died on June 14, 1998, having suffered from lifelong diabetes, as well as rheumatoid arthritis. Over Thanksgiving, 2009, he became engaged to Anke Dening, a long-time assistant. They married in February 2010.

=== Death ===
Volcker died in New York City on December 8, 2019, at age 92. He had reportedly been treated for prostate cancer since being diagnosed the year prior.

== Honorary degrees ==
Volcker received honorary degrees from several educational institutions, including: Baytown Christian Academy, Hamilton College (1980), University of Notre Dame, Princeton University, Dartmouth College, New York University, University of Delaware, Fairleigh Dickinson University, Bryant College, Adelphi University, Lamar University, Bates College (1989), Fairfield University (1994), York University (2001), Williams College (2003), Northwestern University (2004), Rensselaer Polytechnic Institute (2005), Brown University (2006), Georgetown University (2007), Syracuse University (2008), Queen's University (2009), Amherst College (2011), and at the University of Toronto (2015). Maxwell School of Citizenship and Public Affairs at Syracuse University, where Volcker served on the advisory board from 2001 until his death, established the "Paul Volcker Chair" in Behavioral economics in 2011.

== Works ==
- Changing Fortunes, Paul Volcker and Toyoo Gyohten, Crown, May 26, 1992, ISBN 978-1-58648-752-2
- Forbes Great Minds Of Business, Fred Smith, Peter Lynch, Andrew Grove, Paul Volcker (Author), Pleasant Rowland, John Wiley and Paul A. Volcker, Simon and Schuster Audio, October 1, 1997, ISBN 978-0-671-57722-3
- Good Intentions Corrupted: The Oil for Food Scandal And the Threat to the U.N., Paul Volcker, Jeffrey A. Meyer and Mark G. Califano, Public Affairs Gorgias Press, August 28, 2006, ISBN 978-1-58648-472-9
- Keeping at it: The Quest for Sound Money and Good Government (Memoir); Public Affairs 2018, ISBN 978-1541788312

== In popular culture ==
The political rock band Volcker from Portland, Oregon, formed in early 2015, was named after him. It released an eponymous album on January 27, 2016. The band was featured on BBC Radio 4's Economics with Subtitles on August 28, 2016.

== See also ==
- Distinguished German-American of the Year
- List of U.S. political appointments that crossed party lines
- Volcker Rule

== Sources ==
- Morris, Charles R. (2009). The Sages: Warren Buffett, George Soros, Paul Volcker, and the Maelstrom of Markets. PublicAffairs. ISBN 978-1-58648-752-2.
- Silber, William L. (2013). Volcker: The Triumph of Persistence. Bloomsbury Press. ISBN 978-1-620-40292-4.
- Treaster, Joseph (2004). Paul Volcker: The Making of a Financial Legend. Hoboken, N.J.: John Wiley Sons. ISBN 978-0-471-42812-1.
- Meltzer, Allan H. (2009). A History of the Federal Reserve – Volume 2, Book 2: 1970–1986. Chicago: University of Chicago Press. pp. 707–1243. ISBN 978-0226213514.

Other offices
Preceded by Alfred Hayes	President of the Federal Reserve Bank of New York; 1975–1979	Succeeded by Anthony M. Solomon
Government offices
Preceded by G. William Miller	Member of the Federal Reserve Board of Governors; 1979–1987	Succeeded by Alan Greenspan
Preceded by G. William Miller	Chairman of the Federal Reserve; 1979–1987	Succeeded by Alan Greenspan
Political offices
New office	Chair of the President's Economic Recovery Advisory Board; 2009–2011	Succeeded by Jeffrey R. Immelt as Chair of the Council on Jobs and Competitiveness
