= Government intervention during the subprime mortgage crisis =

The government interventions during the subprime mortgage crisis were a response to the 2007–2009 subprime mortgage crisis and resulted in a variety of government bailouts that were implemented to stabilize the financial system during late 2007 and early 2008.

Governments intervened in the United States and United Kingdom and several other Western European countries, such as Belgium, France, Germany, Ireland, Luxembourg, and the Netherlands. In addition, global reform of the banking industry has been discussed to reduce speculation. Measures include a supertax on bankers' bonuses and a financial transaction tax.

== Summary ==
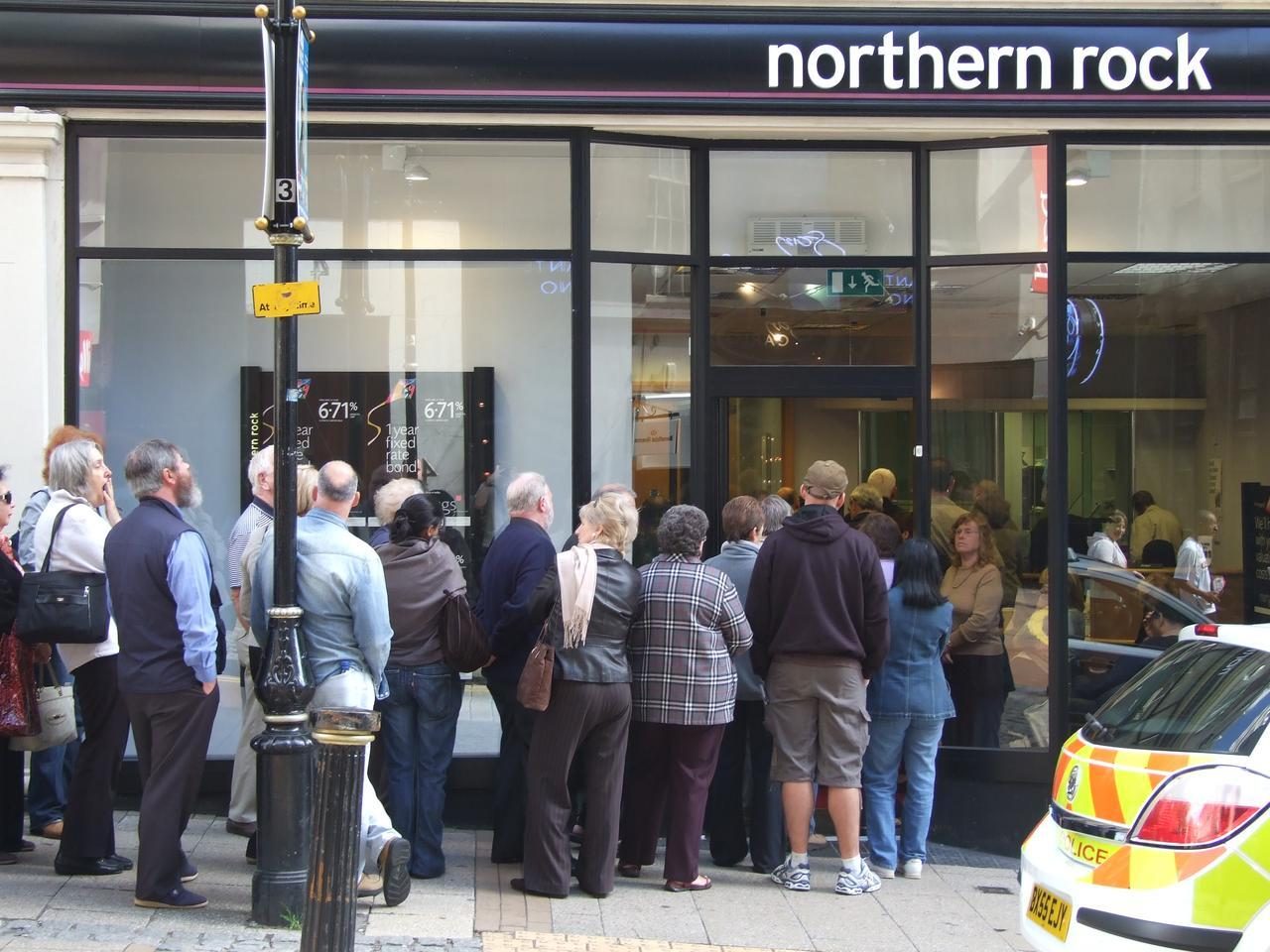
People queuing outside a Northern Rock bank branch in Birmingham, United Kingdom on 15 September 2007, to withdraw their savings because of the subprime crisis.

- Northern Rock, encountering difficulty obtaining the credit it required to remain in business, was nationalised on 17 February 2008. As of 8 October 2008, United Kingdom taxpayer liability arising from this takeover had risen to £87 billion ($150 billion). The remaining bad bank was merged with Bradford & Bingley and became NRAM plc. As of October 2014 around £44 billion in loans remain outstanding.
- Bear Stearns was acquired by JP Morgan Chase in March 2008 for $1.2 billion. The sale was conditional on the Fed's lending Bear Sterns US$29 billion on a nonrecourse basis.
- IndyMac Bank, America's leading Alt-A originator in 2006 with approximately $32 billion in deposits, was placed into conservatorship by the Federal Deposit Insurance Corporation (FDIC) on 11 July 2008, citing liquidity concerns. A bridge bank, IndyMac Federal Bank FSB, was established under the control of the FDIC.
- The GSEs Fannie Mae and Freddie Mac were both placed in conservatorship in September 2008. The two GSEs guaranteed or held mortgage-backed securities (MBS), mortgages, and other debt with a notional value of more than $5 trillion.
- Merrill Lynch was acquired by Bank of America in September 2008 for $50 billion.
- Scottish banking group HBOS was acquired by UK rival Lloyds TSB on 17 September 2008, after "HBOS voiced concerns that depositors and lenders had begun to withdraw their credit from the bank". The UK government made this takeover possible by waiving its competition rules.
- Lehman Brothers declared bankruptcy on 15 September 2008, after the Secretary of the Treasury Henry Paulson, citing moral hazard, refused to bail it out.
- AIG received an $85 billion emergency loan in September 2008 from the Federal Reserve. which AIG wais expected to repay by gradually selling off its assets. In exchange, the federal government acquired a 79.9% equity stake in AIG.
- Washington Mutual (WaMu) was seized in September 2008 by the US Office of Thrift Supervision (OTS). Most of WaMu's untroubled assets were sold to JPMorgan Chase.
- British bank Bradford & Bingley was nationalised on 29 September 2008 by the UK government. The government assumed control of the bank's £50 billion mortgage and loan portfolio, while its deposit and branch network were sold to Spain's Banco Santander.
- In October 2008, the Australian government made A$4 billion available to nonbank lenders unable to issue new loans. After discussion with the industry, this amount was increased to A$8 billion.
- In October 2008, the Swiss National Bank funded a reorganization of UBS that removed bad assets from its books, and later sold its equity stake at a profit.
- In November 2008, the U.S. government purchased $27 billion of preferred stock in Citigroup, a USA bank with over $2 trillion in assets, and warrants on 4.5% of its common stock. The preferred stock carried an 8% dividend. This purchase followed an earlier purchase of $25 billion of the same preferred stock using Troubled Asset Relief Program (TARP) funds.

== Switzerland ==
In October 2008, the Swiss National Bank funded a reorganization of UBS that removed bad assets from its books, and later sold its equity stake at a profit.

== United Kingdom ==
=== Northern Rock ===
Northern Rock had difficulty finding finance to keep the business going and approached the Bank of England as lender of the last resort on 12 September 2007. This caused mass concern about the bank's future. The Bank of England and the UK Government both insisted that the bank was secure and would not collapse. However this failed to stop thousands of customers withdrawing around £1billion from their savings. Northern Rock's share price plummeted and intense pressure from the media, political opposition parties and customers of Northern Rock, forced the Government to nationalize it on 17 February 2008 (see Nationalisation of Northern Rock).

=== Bank rescue package ===
Banks that are short of capital can ask to be rescued. The government has used tax payer's money to buy shares in the banks, making them part nationalised. Banks who take the rescue packages may have restrictions on executive pay and dividends to existing shareholders.

=== Bonus supertax ===
In December 2009, the United Kingdom announced a supertax on banking bonuses, in order to reduce the risk of further crises in the banking sector.

== United States ==
=== Bear Stearns ===
On 16 March 2008, J.P. Morgan Chase announced that it would buy Bear Stearns for $500 million or $2 a share; those same shares a year earlier were trading at around $150. Later, on 24 March 2008 J.P. Morgan Chase increased the offer to $1.2 billion or $10 a share and five days later the acquisition was approved. In order for the deal to go through J.P. Morgan Chase required the Fed to issue a nonrecourse loan of $29 billion to Bear Stearns. This means that the loan is collateralized by mortgage debt and that the government can't go after J.P. Morgan Chase's assets if the mortgage debt collateral becomes insufficient to repay the loan.

The bailout was taken in part to avoid a potential fire sale of nearly U.S. $210 billion of Bear Stearns' MBS and other assets, which could have caused further devaluation in similar securities across the banking system. Chairman of the Fed, Ben Bernanke, defended the bailout by stating that a Bear Stearns' bankruptcy would have affected the real economy and could have caused a "chaotic unwinding" of investments across the US markets.

=== Independent National Mortgage Corporation ===
Before its failure, the Independent National Mortgage Corporation (IndyMac) was the largest savings and loan association in the Los Angeles area and the seventh largest mortgage originator in the United States. The failure of IndyMac Bank on 11 July 2008, was the fourth largest bank failure in United States history, and the second largest failure of a regulated thrift. IndyMac Bank's parent corporation was IndyMac Bancorp until the FDIC seized IndyMac Bank.

=== Fannie Mae and Freddie Mac ===
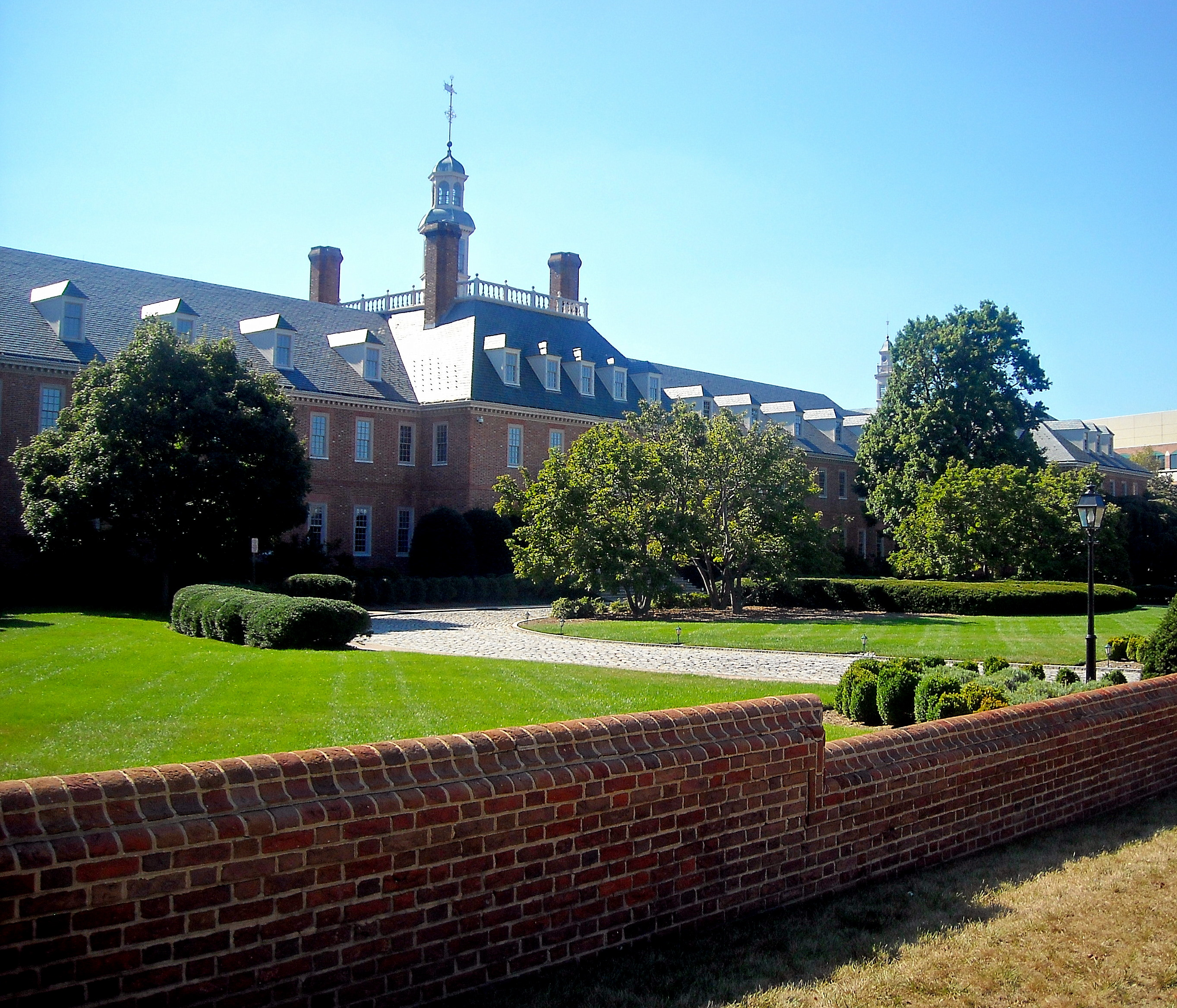
Fannie Mae headquarters at 3900 Wisconsin Avenue, NW in Washington, D.C.

The Federal National Mortgage Association (Fannie Mae) and the Federal Home Loan Mortgage Corporation (Freddie Mac), two large government-sponsored enterprises, are the two largest single mortgage backing entities in the United States. Between the two corporations, they back nearly half of the $12 (~$17.6 trillion in 2025) trillion mortgages outstanding as of 2008. During the mortgage crises, some in the investment community feared the corporations would run out of capital. Both corporations insisted that they were financially solid, with sufficient capital to continue their businesses, but stock prices in both corporations dropped steadily nonetheless.

Given their size and key role in the US housing market, it had long been speculated that the US Government would take action to bolster both companies in such a situation. On 30 July 2008, this speculation became reality when President Bush signed the Housing and Economic Recovery Act of 2008. While analysts disagreed on the financial need for such a bailout, the investor confidence provided by an explicit government show of support was likely needed in any case.

On 5 September 2008, the Treasury Department confirmed that both Fannie Mae and Freddie Mac would be placed into conservatorship with the government taking over management of the pair.

=== Lehman Brothers, Merrill Lynch & Co. and AIG ===
==== Lehman Brothers and Merrill Lynch ====
On 15 September 2008, a day which has been dubbed Meltdown Monday by some News outlets, the 94-year-old Merrill Lynch agreed to be acquired by Bank of America for $50 billion (~$73.3 billion in 2025). Also on that day Lehman Brothers, facing a refusal by the federal government to bail it out, filed for Chapter 11 bankruptcy protection. Treasury Secretary Hank Paulson cited moral hazard as a reason for not bailing out Lehman Brothers.

==== American International Group ====
On 16 September 2008, the Federal Reserve Bank of New York bailed out insurance giant AIG by providing an emergency credit liquidity facility of up to $85 billion (~$125 billion in 2025), which will be repaid by selling off assets of the company. After assessing that a disorderly failure of AIG could worsen the current financial and economic crisis, and at the request of AIG, the Federal Reserve Bank of New York intervened. The Federal Reserve required a 79.9 percent equity stake as a fee for service and to compensate for the risk of the loan to AIG.

=== Washington Mutual ===
The Seattle-based bank holding company Washington Mutual declared bankruptcy on 26 September 2008. The 120-year-old company, one of the largest banking institutions in the US West, was driven into bankruptcy by the subprime crises. On the previous day, 25 September 2008, the United States Office of Thrift Supervision (OTS) announced that it closed the holding company's primary operating subsidiary, Washington Mutual Savings Bank, and had placed it into the receivership of the Federal Deposit Insurance Corporation (FDIC). The FDIC sold the assets, all deposit accounts, and secured liabilities to JPMorgan Chase, but not unsecured debt or equity obligations. Washington Mutual Savings Bank's closure and receivership is the largest U.S. bank failure in history. Kerry Killinger, the CEO from 1988 to August 2008, had been fired by the board of directors. Virtually all savings and checking account holders were not affected as the accounts were insured by the FDIC during the collapse, and subsequently transferred in whole to JPMorgan Chase. The holding company, Washington Mutual Inc was left without its major asset and equity investment, its former subsidiary Washington Mutual Savings Bank, and filed for bankruptcy the following day, the 26th.

WaMu's collapse is the largest U.S. bank failure in history.

=== Wachovia ===
Wachovia Corp., the fourth biggest US bank by assets, agreed on 29 September 2008 to divest all of its banking subsidiaries to CitiGroup in an all-stock transaction, scheduled to be consummated by 31 December 2008. The transaction "open bank" was facilitated by the FDIC and with the concurrence of the United States Department of the Treasury, and the Board of Governors of the Federal Reserve Bank. The FDIC guaranteed to Citigroup to cover any losses on the Wachovia banking portfolio greater than $42 billion, in exchange for $10 billion in preferred stock.

However, Wachovia was eventually sold to Wells Fargo without government assistance, voiding the Citibank deal.

=== Troubled Asset Relief Program ===
The Troubled Asset Relief Program (TARP) is a program of the United States government to purchase toxic assets and equity from financial institutions to strengthen its financial sector that was passed by Congress and signed into law by President George W. Bush on 3 October 2008. It was a component of the government's measures in 2008 to address the subprime mortgage crisis.

The TARP originally authorized expenditures of $700 billion. The Emergency Economic Stabilization Act of 2008 created the TARP. The Dodd–Frank Wall Street Reform and Consumer Protection Act, signed into law in 2010, reduced the amount authorized to $475 billion (~$684 billion in 2025). By 11 October 2012, the Congressional Budget Office (CBO) stated that total disbursements would be $431 billion, and estimated the total cost, including grants for mortgage programs that have not yet been made, would be $24 billion.

On 19 December 2014, the U.S. Treasury sold its remaining holdings of Ally Financial, essentially ending the program.

== Australia ==
=== Guarantee Scheme ===
On 12 October 2008, Australian Prime Minister Kevin Rudd announced that it would guarantee deposits held by all Australian banks, credit unions and building societies, as well as those held by Australian subsidiaries of foreign banks, for 3 years. Later the Treasurer announced the guarantee would be capped at $1 million from 28 November 2008, with greater deposits guaranteed for a fee.

On the same day the deposit guarantee was announced, Rudd also announced a guarantee on those financial institutions' wholesale borrowing for terms up to 5 years. The scheme required the institution to pay a fee for the guarantee and was withdrawn on 31 March 2010. The total funding committed under this guarantee was around €602 billion, with €118.6 billion of guarantees given.
