= Capital Assistance Program =

U.S. Treasury program

The Capital Assistance Program is a U.S. Treasury program that provides capital injections in exchange for mandatory convertible preferred stock and warrants to bank holding companies.

== Functions ==
As part of the Emergency Economic Stabilization Act of 2008 the U.S. Treasury was given funds to stabilize U.S. financial institutions and encourage lending. The Troubled Asset Relief Program (TARP) was to be implemented in two $350 billion authorizations. The first $350 billion went primarily to the Capital Purchase Program primarily allocated under the direction of U.S. Treasury Secretary Henry Paulson an appointee of George W. Bush. The new Barack Obama appointee, U.S. Treasury Secretary Timothy Geithner, announced the Capital Assistance Program on February 10, 2009.

== Features of the program ==
Money is given in exchange for preferred stock that pays a 9 percent dividend. The preferred stock is automatically converted into common stock at the end of seven years. The banks receiving funds will be restricted in paying dividends, buying back their stock, and buying other firms with cash. Because preferred stock is similar to debt in that it gets paid before common stock, some economists have questioned whether the buying of preferred stock by both the Capital Assistance Program and the Capital Purchase Program will be effective in getting banks to lend efficiently.
