= 2008 United Kingdom bank rescue package =

During the period 2007–2009, the UK government intervened financially to support the UK banking sector, and four UK banks in particular.

At peak, the cash cost of these interventions was £137 billion, paid to the banks in the form of loans and new capital. Most of this outlay has been recouped over the years. As at October 2021, the UK Office for Budget Responsibility reported the cost of these interventions as £33 billion, comprising a loss of £35.5 billion on the NatWest (formerly Royal Bank of Scotland (RBS)) rescue, offset by some net gains elsewhere.

The first public indication of the crisis was in February 2007, when HSBC issued its first-ever profit warning as a result of losses incurred by its U.S. consumer finance arm. Later that year, in July 2007, two Bear Stearns hedge funds became insolvent. There followed a series of global events that led to the seizure of interbank credit markets. The UK retail bank Northern Rock, which relied heavily on short term funding, sought emergency assistance from the Bank of England. When this arrangement was publicised, the bank experienced the first run on a British bank in 150 years. In news reported around the world, customers of the bank were shown queuing outside branches to withdraw their deposits. In an effort to stop the panic, on 17 September 2007, the Chancellor of the Exchequer, Alistair Darling, announced the government would guarantee all Northern Rock deposits.

From September 2007 to December 2009, the UK Government made further interventions to support the banking sector, and specifically to RBS (now NatWest), Lloyds Banking Group (LBG), Bradford & Bingley as well as Northern Rock. Northern Rock and Bradford & Bingley were both taken into full public ownership; RBS was taken into majority public ownership; and the government took a minority stake in LBG.

In addition to cash support, the UK government enacted a number of other schemes involving financial guarantees with the aim of restoring confidence in the banking sector. These were contingent liabilities that did not involve cash outlays. The National Audit Office (NAO) estimated that total guarantees added up to over £1 trillion at peak support. As these guarantees were gradually withdrawn or expired, the outstanding sum under guarantee stood at £14 billion as at 31 March 2018.

Subsequently, broadly similar measures were introduced by the United States and the European Union in response to the 2008 financial crisis.

== Background ==
So why not let the banks fail?

In normal times, provided it is handled carefully, a bank can fail. It happened with Barings in the 1990s and BCCI in 1992, and there had been smaller bank failures in the 1970s. In the US, bank failures are commonplace. Provided savers' money can be guaranteed, and provided investors can be reconciled to losing money, then it is all manageable. But I was in no doubt that these were not normal times. The risk of one bank collapsing and taking all the others with it was acute. I suppose it could have been tried, but I would not have wanted to be responsible for the economic and social catastrophe that might follow.

Alistair Darling

UK Chancellor of the Exchequer 2007–2010

"Back from the brink" 2011

=== July 2007 to September 2008 ===
The first public indication of the crisis was in February 2007, when HSBC issued its first-ever profit warning as a result of losses incurred by its U.S. consumer finance arm. Later that year, in July 2007, two Bear Stearns hedge funds became insolvent, and in August 2007, French bank BNP Paribas froze three investment funds.

These events initiated a seizure in the wholesale interbank credit markets. On 14 August 2007 the FSA disclosed concerns about the UK mortgage bank Northern Rock, which relied heavily on such markets in its funding model, to HM Treasury and the Bank of England. On 13 September the BBC reported that Northern Rock had been granted emergency financial support by the Bank of England in its role as lender of last resort. This triggered the first run on a UK bank in 150 years, that was ended only when HM Treasury announced, on 20 September, that the UK government would guarantee all existing Northern Rock retail deposits. The following month, the guarantee was extended to all new deposits. In February 2008, Northern Rock was taken into full public ownership.

In April 2008, the Bank of England launched the Special Liquidity Scheme, allowing banks to swap mortgage-backed assets for Treasury bonds, so providing more trusted collateral for accessing market liquidity. The same month, Royal Bank of Scotland launched a £12 billion rights issue to supplement its equity capital.

In September 2008, the US government launched bail-out rescues of the US mortgage lenders Fannie Mae (Federal National Mortgage Association) and Freddie Mac (Federal Home Loan Mortgage Corporation).

=== September 2008 – collapse of Lehman Brothers ===
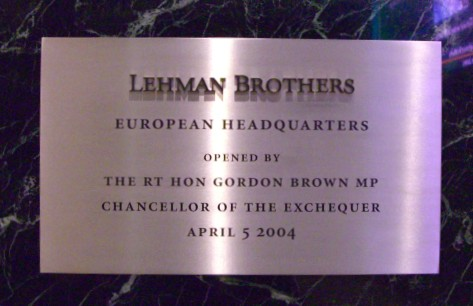
Ceremonial plaque from the opening of Lehman Brothers’ European HQ in Canary Wharf in 2004. Later, in 2010, this would be auctioned by the Lehman administrators for £28,750.

In 2008 Lehman Brothers was the fourth largest US investment bank, with worldwide operations. Its two principal business units were the broker dealers Lehman Brothers Inc (LBI), based in New York, and Lehman Brothers International (Europe) (LBIE), based in London.

The cash resources of the Lehman Group were managed centrally in New York by the parent company, Lehman Brothers Holdings Inc. (LBHI). Following a deterioration in LBHI's financial position, on the afternoon of Sunday 14 September 2008, the directors of Lehman Brothers International (Europe) Ltd (LBIE) sought assurances from LBHI that payments due to be made on its behalf on the following business day would be made. At approximately 12.30 am on 15 September, LBHI informed LBIE that it was preparing to file for Chapter 11 Bankruptcy protection under US law and that it was therefore no longer in a position to make payments to or on behalf of LBIE. Accordingly, overnight preparations were made for a number of UK based Lehman companies to protect their interests by seeking an Administration Order under UK law. This order was granted by a UK judge at 7.56 am on Monday 15 September 2008.

The immediate impact of the failure of the LBIE business in particular included 142,000 unsettled securities trades to which LBIE was a counterparty, of which approximately 83,500 were trades to be settled in Europe, 45,000 in Asia and 12,500 in the US. There were gross assets (i.e. grossed up for collateral and Client Assets)totalling $628 billion and gross liabilities of $611 billion, which after counterparty and cross product netting and eliminating amounts relating to trust property, reduced to assets of $49.5 billion and liabilities of $32.6 billion. These were frozen and would remain so for several years.

The Lehman collapse initiated a period of significant market turmoil. This was caused by complex financial interrelationships between the major banks, since assets on the Lehman balance sheet were inaccessible by counterparties, creating a domino effect in financial markets.

=== Failure of HBOS and Lloyds takeover ===
Following the market disruption caused by the Lehman collapse, attention turned to HBOS, then the UK's largest mortgage lender.

The bank had first appeared on the HM Treasury watch list after the Northern Rock problems surfaced, when it became clear that the HBOS funding model closely resembled that of Northern Rock. The bank was offering highly competitive and unprofitable housing market loans, combined with aggressive and high risk commercial lending. By July 2008, profits had halved and bad debts were up by a third.

On 16 September HBOS saw 33 per cent of its value wiped out in a single day. The Financial Services Authority (FSA), the UK financial services regulator, responded by imposing a temporary ban on short selling of shares. At the same time, the UK government brokered an agreement with Lloyds Bank to acquire HBOS in a private sector deal. This was announced three days after the Lehman Brothers collapse, on 18 September.

=== Preparation of the recapitalisation plan ===
By the end of September 2008, Mervyn King, Governor of the Bank of England, Adair Turner, Chairman of the FSA, and Alistair Darling agreed that plans needed to be prepared for the recapitalisation of the banking system. Until that point, the crisis had primarily been one of liquidity, but the problem had now shifted to one of lack of capital. The only realistic source of new capital was the UK government. Darling instructed the Treasury to prepare a recapitalisation plan that envisaged the injection of billions of pounds into UK banks in return for equity. This would be financed by UK government bond sales.

=== Royal Bank of Scotland imminent collapse ===
On 7 October 2008, following a 35% plunge in the bank's share price, dealing in the bank's shares was suspended. The bank Chairman, Tom McKillop, contacted the Chancellor of the Exchequer, Alistair Darling, to advise that the bank was within hours of running out of money. Darling later observed that

When dealings in bank shares are suspended it is all over. I knew the bank was finished, in the most spectacular way possible. The game was up. If the markets could give up on RBS, one of the largest banks in the world, all bets on Britain's and the world's financial system were off.

This was the decisive event that triggered the implementation of the recapitalisation plan.

== Detailed support measures ==
The intervention plan provided for several sources of funding to be made available to an aggregate total of £137 billion in cash injections and loans at peak, and a further £1,029 billion in guarantees at peak. As at October 2021, the OBR reported the current cost of these interventions as £33 billion, comprising a loss of £35.5 billion on the NatWest (formerly Royal Bank of Scotland) rescue, offset by some net gains elsewhere.

=== Cash support ===
Through the Bank Recapitalisation Fund, the government bought a combination of ordinary shares and preference shares in the affected banks. The amount and proportion of the stake taken in any one bank was negotiated with the individual bank. Banks that accepted rescue packages had restrictions on executive pay and dividends to existing shareholders, as well as a mandate to offer reasonable credit to homeowners and small businesses. The long-term government plan was to offset the cost of this program by receiving dividends from these shares, and in the long run, to sell the shares after a market recovery. This plan covered the possibility of underwriting new issues of shares by any participating bank. The plan was characterised as, in effect, full or partial nationalisation.

As at October 2021, the overall breakdown of cash support to banks and other entities was reported by the OBR to comprise the following:

£ billions
	Lloyds	NatWest	UKAR	FSCS	CGS	SLS	Other	Total
Cash outlays at peak	-20.5	45.8	44.1	20.9	0.0	0.0	5.3	136.6
Principal repayments	21.1	8.9	43.7	20.9	0.0	0.0	5.3	99.9
Other fees received	3.2	6.4	11.9	3.5	4.3	2.3	0.3	31.8
Net cash position	3.8	30.5	11.5	3.5	4.3	2.3	0.2	5.0
Outstanding payments	0.0	0.0	0.0	0.0	0.0	0.0	0.1	0.1
Market value	0.0	13.0	5.4	0.0	0.0	0.0	0.0	18.4
Implied balance	3.8	-17.5	16.9	3.5	4.3	2.3	0.3	13.5
Exchequer financing	4.5	18.0	14.5	9.3	0.0	0.4	0.6	46.5
Overall balance	0.8	35.5	2.4	5.8	4.3	2.7	0.3	33.0

source: OBR Economic and fiscal outlook October 2021

Notes

- UKAR: UK Asset Resolution – managed UK government holdings in Bradford & Bingley and Northern Rock Asset Management plc prior to their sale.
- FSCS: Financial Services Compensation Scheme – the UK's statutory deposit insurance and investors' compensation scheme for customers of authorised financial services firms.
- CGS: Credit Guarantee Scheme – a scheme introduced in 2008 allowing banks to issue debt guaranteed by the government. The scheme closed in October 2012.
- SLS: Special Liquidity Scheme – designed to allow easier access to market liquidity by using UK Treasury securities as collateral. The scheme closed in January 2012.

=== Other support schemes ===
==== Credit Guarantee Scheme ====
The Credit Guarantee Scheme formed part of the UK government's banking intervention measures announced on 8 October 2008, becoming operational on 13 October 2008.

The scheme was designed to allow banks to issue debt guaranteed by the government, with the intention of enabling them to borrow more, and more cheaply, and hence lend more.

The banks that participated in the scheme included RBS, Lloyds, Barclays, Bank of Scotland, Nationwide Building Society, Clydesdale Bank, Tesco Personal Finance, Yorkshire Building Society, and Skipton Building Society.

The Scheme was closed to new issuance on 28 February 2010 and was finally closed when the final guarantee expired on 26 October 2012.

==== Special Liquidity Scheme ====
The Special Liquidity Scheme (SLS) was launched by the Bank of England on 21 April 2008.

The SLS allowed banks to swap mortgage-backed and other securities for UK Treasury Bills. This was designed to allow easier access to market liquidity by using UK Treasury securities as collateral. The background to the scheme was the market closure for many securities, leaving assets on bank balance sheets which were unable to be sold or to be pledged as security to raise funds. This contributed to a market seizure where banks became reluctant to make new loans, even to each other.

Under the SLS banks were provided with the means to swap illiquid assets, such as mortgage-backed securities, of designated quality for Treasury Bills. The SLS had three key features:

- The asset swaps were long term, with each swap for a period of 1 year and a renewal option for up to 3 years.
- Banks retained responsibility for losses on their loans
- The SLS was only available for existing assets as at the end of 2007; the scheme could not be used to finance new lending.

The SLS was closed in January 2012 when the last of the SLS transactions expired.

==== Asset Purchase Facility (Quantitative Easing) ====
The Bank of England Asset Purchase Facility, more commonly known as quantitative easing (QE), was introduced in 2009.

This was primarily designed as an instrument of monetary policy. The mechanism required the Bank of England to purchase government bonds on the secondary market, financed by the creation of new central bank money. This would have the effect of increasing the asset prices of the bonds purchased, thereby lowering yields and dampening longer term interest rates. The aim of the policy was initially to ease liquidity constraints in the sterling reserves system, but evolved into a wider policy to provide economic stimulus.

QE was enacted in six tranches between 2009 and 2020. At its peak in 2020, the portfolio totalled £895 billion, comprising £875 billion of UK government bonds and £20 billion of high grade commercial bonds.

In February 2022 the Bank of England announced its intention to commence winding down the QE portfolio. Initially this would be achieved by not replacing tranches of maturing bonds, and would later be accelerated through active bond sales.

In August 2022 the Bank of England reiterated its intention to accelerate the QE wind down through active bond sales. This policy was affirmed in an exchange of letters between the Bank of England and the UK Chancellor of the Exchequer in September 2022. Between February 2022 and September 2022, a total of £37.1bn of government bonds matured, reducing the outstanding stock from £875.0bn at the end of 2021 to £837.9bn. In addition, a total of £1.1bn of corporate bonds matured, reducing the stock from £20.0bn to £18.9bn, with sales of the remaining stock planned to begin on 27 September.

On 28 September 2022 the Bank of England issued a Market Notice announcing its intention to "carry out purchases of long dated gilts in a temporary and targeted way". This was in response to market conditions in which the sterling exchange rate and bond asset pricing were significantly disrupted following a UK government fiscal statement. The Bank stated its announcement would apply to conventional gilts of residual maturity greater than 20 years in the secondary market. The existing constraints applicable to QE bond purchases would continue to apply. The funding of the purchases would be met from central bank reserves, but would be segregated in a different portfolio from existing asset purchases. The Bank also announced that its annual £80bn target to reduce the existing QE portfolio remained unchanged but, in the light of current market conditions, the beginning of gilt sale operations would be postponed to 31 October 2022.

=== Participating banks ===
[The banks] did have a lot of questions and they wanted to understand the fine detail. It was obvious that they wanted the government guarantee to underpin their lending and to expand the special liquidity scheme, but they were less keen on raising capital. I said they could not have the one without the other. I said, we proposed to make available £50 billion. The FSA would decide how much each bank needed to raise. They would then have a choice: they could raise it themselves on the markets, or if they couldn't, we would provide it in return for a shareholding.

Alistair Darling

Chancellor of the Exchequer 2007–2010

"Back from the brink" 2011

The plan was open to all UK incorporated banks and all building societies, including the following: Abbey, Barclays, Clydesdale Bank, HBOS, HSBC, Lloyds, Nationwide Building Society, Royal Bank of Scotland, and Standard Chartered.

The extent to which different banks participated varied according to their needs. HSBC Group issued a statement announcing it was injecting £750 m of capital into the UK bank and therefore has "no plans to utilise the UK government's recapitalisation initiative ... [as] the Group remains one of the most strongly capitalised and liquid banks in the world". Standard Chartered also declared its support for the scheme but its intention not to participate in the capital injection element. Barclays raised its own new capital from private investors.

==== Royal Bank of Scotland (now NatWest) ====
The total UK government investment in RBS was £45.8 billion, with public ownership peaking at 84%.

After announcing the recapitalisation measures in October 2008, the UK Government purchased an initial tranche of RBS shares in December 2008 totalling £20 billion; it then converted preference shares into ordinary shares in April 2009 and purchased a final tranche of shares in December 2009, taking the final total to £45.5 billion. The average price per share paid by the Treasury was 499 pence, after receiving income from redeeming the preference shares.

In August 2015 the UK government began the process of selling its RBS shares. It sold a 5.4% stake at an average of 330p per share. This brought its shareholding down to 72.9%. This transaction represented a loss of £1.9 billion (£1.1 billion excluding financing) to UK taxpayers.

A second sale took place in June 2018, when the UK government disposed of second tranche of shares, representing a 7.7% stake, at an average price of 271p per share. This brought its shareholding down to 62.4%. In both cases, the government sold well below the average price of 499p per share it had paid, with the June 2018 transaction representing a loss of £2.1 billion to UK taxpayers.

In March 2021 the UK government sold a further tranche of 590 million shares in NatWest at a price of 190.5p per share. This was followed by an announcement in July 2021 that the UK government would carry out open market sales in NatWest for a year from August 2021. By January 2022, it had sold 170.4 million shares in the NatWest Group totalling about £420 million, reducing its stake in the bank to 51%.

After further sales in 2022, the UK government's RBS shareholding reduced below 50% for the first time since 2008, from 51% to 48.1%. This involved 550 million shares in NatWest at an average price of 220.5p per share, realising £1.2 billion.

==== Lloyds Banking Group ====
HBOS and Lloyds together raised £17 billion, £8.5 billion in preference shares and a further £8.5 billion issue of ordinary shares. The Fund purchased the preference shares outright, for a total £13.5 billion investment, and underwrote the issues of ordinary shares.

==== Bradford & Bingley ====
Bradford & Bingley was nationalised by the UK government on 29 September 2008.

The bank was divided into two businesses after the takeover. The depositor base of 2.7m customers and its network of 197 leasehold branches were sold to Santander Bank for £612 million.

The Bradford & Bingley mortgage book, along with its equivalent at Northern Rock (Asset Management) were brought together under a single holding company, UK Asset Resolution (UKAR).

==== Northern Rock ====
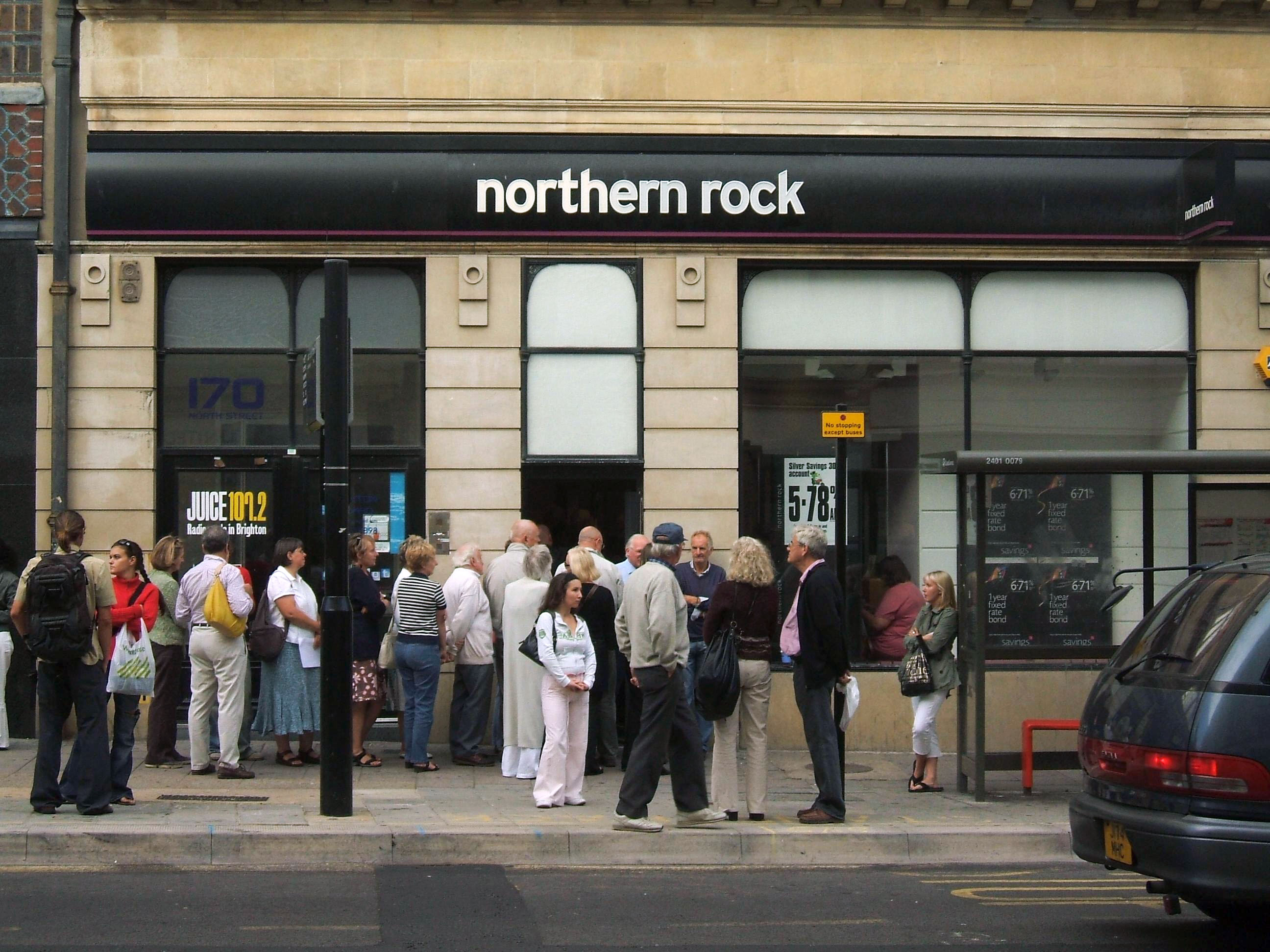
People queuing at a branch of the Northern Rock bank in Brighton on 14 September 2007

The Bank of England extended emergency loans totalling £25 billion to Northern Rock after it was unable to continue funding its loan book with wholesale financing in 2007. This triggered a public run on the bank. Attempts were made to find a private sector buyer. When these failed, Northern Rock was nationalised in February 2008.

After further losses emerged, HM Treasury devised a strategy to divide Northern Rock into a "good bank" and "bad bank." The "good bank" was Northern Rock plc, which was responsible for holding and servicing all pre-existing customer savings accounts and some pre-existing mortgage accounts. Northern Rock plc received additional capital of £1.4 billion of equity from the UK government. The strategy was to prepare the bank for sale into the private sector.

The "bad bank" was Northern Rock (Asset Management) plc, which held and serviced the closed mortgage book. On 1 October 2010, the UK government established of UK Asset Resolution as a holding company to manage and run down the assets of Northern Rock (Asset Management) plc alongside those of Bradford & Bingley.

On 1 January 2012, Virgin Money purchased Northern Rock plc, and in July 2012 additionally purchased a substantial tranche of Northern Rock (Asset Management) mortgages from UKAR.

== Timeline ==
=== 2007 ===
Date	Event	Description
8 February 2007	HSBC profit warning	UK bank HSBC issues the first profit warning in its 142 year history.
17 July 2007	Bear Stearns losses	US Investment Bank Bear Stearns announces losses on two hedge funds.
9 Aug 2007	French bank BNP Paribas freezes three investment funds	French bank BNP Paribas freezes three investment funds dues to its exposure in the sub-prime mortgage market. The ECB injects 5 billion euros into the credit market to improve liquidity.
14 Aug 2007	FSA discloses concerns about Northern Rock	The Financial Services Authority discloses concerns about Northern Rock plc to HM Treasury and the Bank of England.
1 September 2007	Northern Rock plc takes emergency loan from the Bank of England	The Bank of England provides an emergency borrowing facility to Northern Rock plc, due to its funding problems in the wholesale money market.
13 September 2007	BBC reports Northern Rock emergency loan	BBC News At Ten Business Editor Robert Peston reports details of the Bank of England emergency borrowing facility to Northern Rock plc.
14 September 2007	Run on Northern Rock begins	Queues form at Northern Rock branches as depositors withdraw their savings, in the first run on a UK bank in 150 years.
17 September 2007	Chancellor announces guarantee of Northern Rock deposits	UK Chancellor Alistair Darling announces that the UK government will guarantee all existing Northern Rock deposits.
19 September 2007	Bank of England announces credit injection	The Bank of England announces an injection of £10 billion into credit markets in an attempt to bring down 3 month inter-bank interest rates.
9 October 2007	Extended protection for Northern Rock depositors	HM Treasury announces that the UK government guarantee would apply to all Northern Rock retail deposits after 19 September.

== UK political perspective ==
Alistair Darling, the Chancellor of the Exchequer, told the House of Commons in a statement on 8 October 2008 that the proposals were "designed to restore confidence in the banking system", and that the funding would "put the banks on a stronger footing". Prime Minister Gordon Brown suggested that the government's actions had 'led the way' for other nations to follow whilst Shadow Chancellor George Osborne stated that "This is the final chapter of the age of irresponsibility and it's absolutely extraordinary that a government has been driven by events to today's announcement"; in addition to offering opposition support for the plan.

Darling said in 2018 that the country was hours away from a breakdown of law and order if the Royal Bank of Scotland had not been bailed out and people could not access money.

== International perspective ==
=== Central banks ===
On 8 October 2008 there was a strategic and co-ordinated global effort by seven central banks to calm the financial crisis, by cutting interest rates by 0.5%. The banks were all members of the OECD and included the Bank of England, the European Central Bank and the US Federal Reserve along with central banks in China, Switzerland, Canada and Sweden.

=== Comparison with U.S. TARP ===
The British rescue plan differed from the initial United States' $700 billion bailout under the Emergency Economic Stabilization Act of 2008, which was announced on 3 October and entitled the Troubled Asset Relief Program (TARP). The £50bn being invested by the UK Government saw them purchasing shares in the banks, whereas the American program was primarily devoted to the U.S. government purchasing the mortgage backed securities of the American banks which were not able to be sold in the secondary mortgage securities market. The U.S. program required the U.S. government to take an equity interest in financial organisations selling their securities into the TARP but did not address the fundamental solvency problem faced by the banking sector; rather was aimed at tackling the immediate funding shortfall. The UK package tackled both solvency, through the £50bn recapitalisation plan, and funding, through the government guarantee for banks' debt issuances and the expansion of the Bank of England's Special Liquidity Scheme. Announced on 14 October, the U.S. subsequently undertook investments in banks through the Capital Purchase Program and the FDIC guaranteed banks' debt through the Temporary Lending Guarantee Program.

=== International reactions ===
Paul Krugman, writing in his column for The New York Times, stated that "Mr Brown and Alistair Darling, the Chancellor of the Exchequer have defined the character of the worldwide rescue effort, with other wealthy nations playing catch-up." He also stated that "Luckily for the world economy,... Gordon Brown and his officials are making sense,... And they may have shown us the way through this crisis." Other commentators noted that although the capitalist model should have allowed inefficient businesses to go bust, the banks were "too big to fail".

The British banking bail-out example was closely followed by the rest of Europe, as well as the U.S Government, who on 14 October 2008 announced a $250bn (£143bn) Capital Purchase Program to buy stakes in a wide variety of banks in an effort to restore confidence in the sector. The money came from the $700bn bail-out package approved by U.S. lawmakers earlier that month.

A wave of international action to address the financial crisis affected stock markets around the world. Although shares in the affected banks fell, the Dow Jones went up by more than 900 points, or 11.1 per cent, while London shares also bounced back, with the FTSE 100 Index closing more than 8 per cent higher on 13 October 2008.

== See also ==
- Government intervention during the subprime mortgage crisis
- Banking (Special Provisions) Act 2008
- 2009 United Kingdom bank rescue package
- UK Financial Investments
- List of banks in the United Kingdom
