= 2009 United Kingdom bank rescue package =

UK response to the 2008 Financial crisis

A second bank rescue package totalling at least £50 billion was announced by the British government on 12 January 2009, as a response to the 2008 financial crisis. The package was designed to increase the amount of money that banks could lend to businesses and private individuals. This aid came in two parts: an initial £50 billion made available to big corporate borrowers, and a second undisclosed amount that formed a form of insurance against banks suffering big losses.

== Bailout ==
Following the October 2008 bailouts of RBS, HBOS and Lloyds TSB together with Lloyds TSB's January 2009 merger with HBOS, the Government was holding a 43% stake in Lloyds Banking Group, but then on 6 March 2009, after it became apparent that the HBOS merger had been bad for Lloyds since HBOS had made losses of £11bn, the Government announced it would increase its stake in Lloyds to 65% (77% if including non-voting preference shares). The investment was maintained at 43% after a rights issue.

RBS had received £5bn in preference shares purchased by the Government who also underwrote a £15bn rights issue, which failed to attract investors, leaving the Government with an investment of £20bn for a 58% stake. The Government, on what became Blue Monday Crash, realising that RBS could not afford the 12% coupon payment on the preference shares, RBS having released financial results showing a loss of £28bn, converted those shares to ordinary shares, increasing its stake to 70%. The investment in RBS has increased to £45bn with a 72% stake held by the British Government.

== Recovery of bailout funds ==
- Lloyds

The investment in Lloyds had cost £20.3bn which the British Government began to recover by selling its 43% investment in 2013. Sales continued until the final tranche of 0.5% in May 2017, the Government making a small profit on the sales, realising £21.2bn.

- RBS

An investment of £45.977bn was made across three tranches in December 2008 (£14.969bn), April 2009 (£5.508bn) and December 2009 (£25.500bn) at an average investment per share of 502p and represented an 84.4% stake in the company. Since these investments, the bank has paid back the government £305m in underwriting fees, £2.504bn to exit the Asset Protection Scheme, £1.280bn in Contingent Capital Facility fees as well as retiring the special Dividend Access Share for £1.513bn in March 2016. Therefore, the total investment net of all fees and dividends is £40.375bn and represents an investment per share of 440p.

In August 2015, a first tranche of 5.4% of the total issued share capital in the company was sold to institutional investors for £2,079m or £3.30 per share. As at 31 March 2017, this takes the governments overall stake to 71.2%.

The Government has been making large provisions for losses in their public accounts.

In 2018 RBS paid its first dividend since the bailout, the government picking up around £150m on its 62% holding. The government planned to sell £3bn of shares per annum until 2023.

== See also ==
- 2008 United Kingdom bank rescue package
- Banking (Special Provisions) Act 2008
- Asset Protection Agency
- Bank of England - Asset Purchase Facility
- Banking Act 2009
- UK Financial Investments
