= Asset Protection Agency =

Former executive agency in the UK

Logo of the Asset Protection Agency

The Asset Protection Agency (APA) was an executive agency of the Government of the United Kingdom, operating as part of HM Treasury. The APA was created in response to the late-2000s recession (caused by the 2008 financial crisis) to implement the Asset Protection Scheme (APS), part of the 2009 United Kingdom bank rescue package. It closed on 31 October 2012 following the ending of the APS.

== See also ==
- National Asset Management Agency
