= Matthew Pendo =

American investment banker

Mathew Pendo
- Education: Princeton University
- Occupations: Investment Banker, Chief Investment Officer
- Known for: CIO for the Office of Financial Stability, United States Treasury

Mathew Pendo is an investment banker, having worked for Merrill Lynch and Barclays before taking a position as Chief Investment Officer of the Office of Financial Stability of the United States Treasury in 2011. After several years managing his responsibilities under the Troubled Asset Relief Program and coordinating divestiture of the portfolio, Pendo has returned to the private sector as an investment banker.

== Career ==
=== Merrill Lynch ===
Matt spent 18 years at Merrill Lynch in investment banking in New York, Los Angeles, and Palo Alto working with companies in the financial services and technology industries.

=== Barclays Capital ===
After Merrill Lynch, Matt spent seven years as a managing director in investment banking at Barclays Capital, including roles as co-head of U.S. investment banking and co-head of global industrials.

=== United States Treasury ===
Pendo served as Chief Investment Officer of the Office of Financial Stability of the United States Treasury under Assistant Secretary of the Treasury for Financial Stability Herb Allison and Secretary of the Treasury Timothy Geithner from March 2011 to March 2013.

As part of his duties, he oversaw the investments created under the Troubled Asset Relief Program (TARP), a $700 billion financial support program designed to strengthen the financial and manufacturing sectors of the economy. The TARP investment programs included bank support programs, credit market programs, automotive industry support programs, and AIG. He successfully managed the substantial liquidation of the portfolio during 2012 and 2013.

=== Ally Financial ===
In April 2013, Pendo was appointed to serve as a member of the board of directors of Ally Financial.

=== Sandler O'Neill ===
In September 2013, Pendo joined the investment bank Sandler O'Neill in their investment banking group.

=== Oaktree Capital ===
In 2015, Pendo joined Oaktree Capital as its Head of Corporate Development and Capital Markets.

== Personal life and education ==
Pendo graduated cum laude from Princeton University in 1985. He was co-captain of the Princeton Tigers tennis team.
