= Meltdown Monday =

Term in finance describing Mondays with large losses

Meltdown Monday is a term used by some financial news outlets to describe Mondays with large losses in financial markets. In the late 1980s, and early 1990s, the term was used most often in reference to October 19, 1987, which later became known as Black Monday 1987 (a reference to the older term with a similar meaning, Black Monday). Several events which were initially referred to as Meltdown Mondays by the press have since been referred to most often as Black Mondays.
