= Emergency Economic Stabilization Act of 2008 =

US law creating the Troubled Asset Relief Program (TARP)

- Long title: An Act to provide authority for the Federal Government to purchase and insure certain types of troubled assets for the purposes of providing stability to and preventing disruption in the economy and financial system and protecting taxpayers, to amend the Internal Revenue Code of 1986 to provide incentives for energy production and conservation, to extend certain expiring provisions, to provide individual income tax relief, and for other purposes.
- Enacted by: the 110th United States Congress

Citations
- Public law: Pub. L. 110–343 (text) (PDF)
- Statutes at Large: 122 Stat. 3765

Codification
- U.S.C. sections amended: 26 U.S.C.

Legislative history
- Introduced in the House as H.R. 1424 by Patrick J. Kennedy (D‑RI 1st) on March 9, 2007; Committee consideration by House Energy and Commerce, House Education and Labor, and House Ways and Means; Passed the House on March 5, 2008 (268-148); Passed the Senate on October 1, 2008 (74-25); Agreed to by the House on October 3, 2008 (263-171); Signed into law by President George W. Bush on October 3, 2008

The Emergency Economic Stabilization Act of 2008, also known as the "bank bailout of 2008" or the "Wall Street bailout", was a United States federal law enacted during the Great Recession, which created federal programs to "bail out" failing financial institutions and banks. The bill was proposed by Treasury Secretary Henry Paulson, passed by the 110th United States Congress, and was signed into law by President George W. Bush. It became law as part of Public Law 110-343 on October 3, 2008. It created the $700 billion Troubled Asset Relief Program (TARP) whose funds would purchase toxic assets from failing banks. The funds were mostly directed to inject capital into banks and other financial institutions as the Treasury continued to review the effectiveness of targeted asset-purchases.

The 2008 financial crisis developed partly due to the subprime mortgage crisis, causing the failure or near-failure of major financial institutions like Lehman Brothers and American International Group. Seeking to prevent the collapse of the financial system, Secretary of the Treasury Paulson called for the U.S. government to purchase several hundred billion dollars in distressed assets from financial institutions. His proposal was initially rejected by Congress, but the bankruptcy of Lehman Brothers and lobbying by President Bush ultimately convinced Congress to enact the proposal as part of Public Law 110-343.

Early estimates for the bailout's risk cost were as much as $700 billion; however, TARP recovered $441.7 billion from $426.4 billion invested, earning a $15.3 billion profit (an annualized rate of return of 0.6%), which may have been a loss when adjusted for inflation.

== History ==
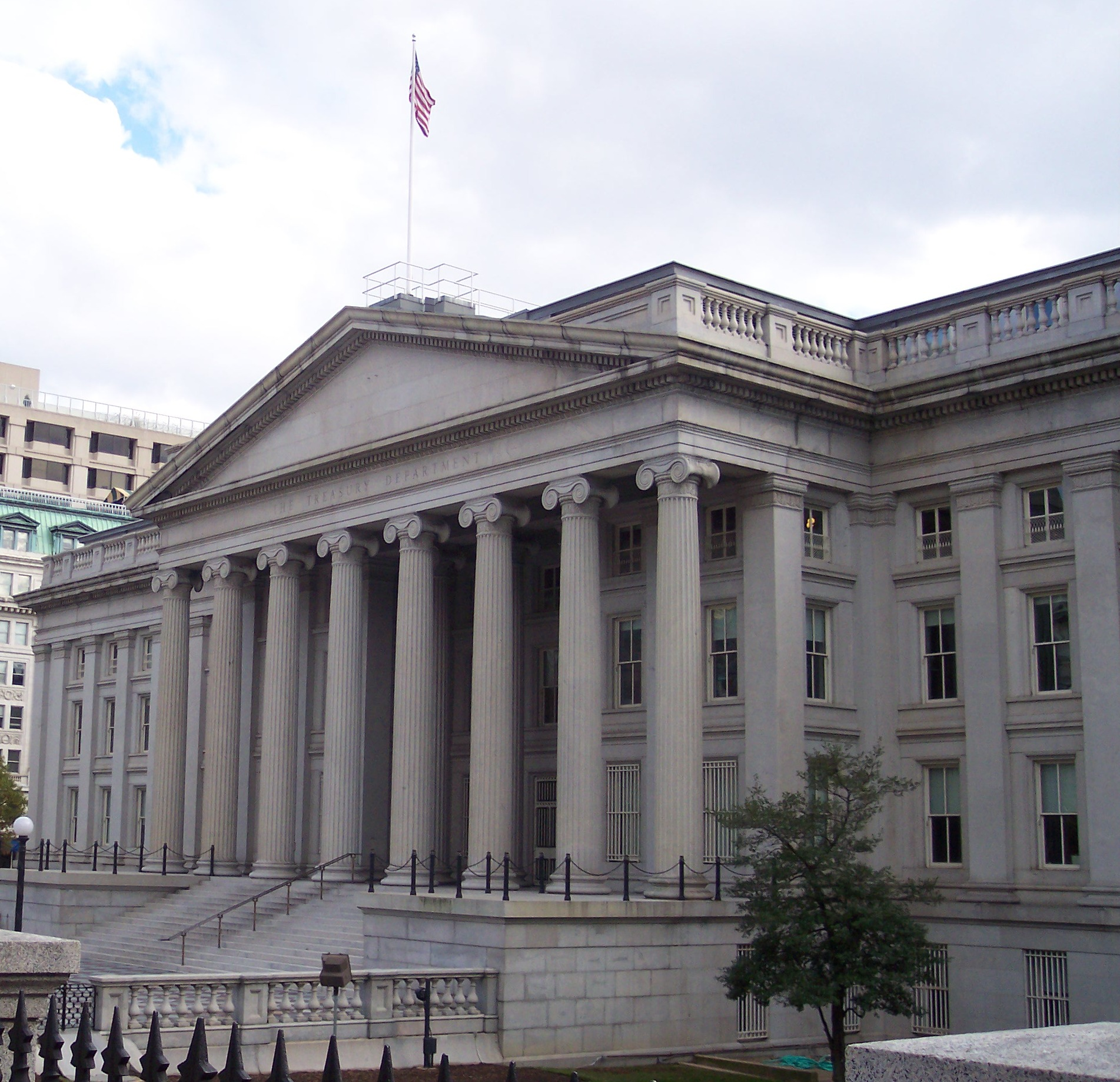
United States Department of the Treasury

After the freeing up of world capital markets in the 1970s and the repeal of the Glass–Steagall Act in 1999, banking practices (mostly Greenspan-inspired "self-regulation") and monetized subprime mortgages sold as low risk investments reached a critical stage during September 2008, characterized by severely contracted liquidity in the global credit markets and insolvency threats to investment banks and other institutions. In response, the U.S. government announced a series of comprehensive steps to address the problems, following a series of "one-off" or "case-by-case" decisions to intervene or not, such as the $85 billion liquidity facility for American International Group on September 16, the federal takeover of Fannie Mae and Freddie Mac, and the bankruptcy of Lehman Brothers.

The legislation had its origin in early 2008 when Secretary of the Treasury Henry Paulson directed two of his aides, Neel Kashkari and Phillip Swagel, to write a plan to recapitalize the U.S. financial system in case of total collapse. The plan, which was also presented to Federal Reserve Chairman Ben Bernanke, called for the U.S. government to purchase about $500 billion in distressed assets from financial institutions.

The original proposal was submitted to the United States House of Representatives, with the purpose of purchasing bad assets, reducing uncertainty regarding the worth of the remaining assets, and restoring confidence in the credit markets. The bill was then expanded and put forth as an amendment to H.R. 3997. The amendment was rejected via a vote of the House of Representatives on September 29, 2008, voting 205–228.

Supporters of the plan argued that the market intervention called for by the plan was vital to prevent further erosion of confidence in the U.S. credit markets and that failure to act could lead to an economic depression. Opponents objected to the plan's cost and rapidity, pointing to polls that showed little support among the public for "bailing out" Wall Street investment banks, claimed that better alternatives were not considered, and claimed that the Senate forced passage of the unpopular version through the opposing house by "sweetening" the bailout package.

On October 1, 2008, the Senate debated and voted on an amendment to H.R. 1424, which substituted a newly revised version of the Emergency Economic Stabilization Act of 2008 for the language of H.R. 1424. The Senate accepted the amendment and passed the entire amended bill, voting 74–25. Additional unrelated provisions added an estimated $150 billion to the cost of the package and increased the length of the bill to 451 pages. (See Public Law 110-343 for details on the added provisions.) The amended version of H.R. 1424 was sent to the House for consideration, and on October 3, the House voted 263–171 to enact the bill into law. President George W. Bush signed the bill into law within hours of its congressional enactment, creating the $700 billion Troubled Asset Relief Program (TARP) to purchase failing bank assets.

On Monday, October 6, the Dow Jones Industrial Average dropped more than 700 points and fell below 10,000 for the first time in four years. The same day, CNN reported these worldwide stock market events: Britain's FTSE 100 Index was down 7.9%; Germany's DAX down 7.1%; France's CAC 40 dropping 9%; in Russia, trading in shares was suspended after the RTS stock index fell more than 20%; Iceland halted trading in six bank stocks while the government drafted a crisis plan.

On October 8, the British announced their bank rescue package consisting of funding, debt guarantees and infusing capital into banks via preferred stock. This model was closely followed by the rest of Europe, as well as the U.S government, who on October 14 announced a $250bn (£143bn) Capital Purchase Program to buy stakes in a wide variety of banks in an effort to restore confidence in the sector. The money came from the $700bn Troubled Asset Relief Program.

Over the next six months, TARP was dwarfed by other guarantees and lending limits; analysis by Bloomberg found the Federal Reserve had, by March 2009, committed $7.77 trillion (~$11.3 trillion in 2025) to rescuing the financial system, more than half the value of everything produced in the U.S. that year.

== Paulson proposal ==
U.S. treasury secretary Henry Paulson proposed a plan under which the U.S. Treasury would acquire up to $700 billion worth of mortgage-backed securities. The plan was immediately backed by President George W. Bush and negotiations began with leaders in the U.S. Congress to draft appropriate legislation. On Thursday, September 18, 2008, Paulson and Chair of the Federal Reserve Ben Bernanke had a dramatic meeting with Congressional leaders, to whom Bernanke reportedly said: "If we don't do this, we may not have an economy on Monday".

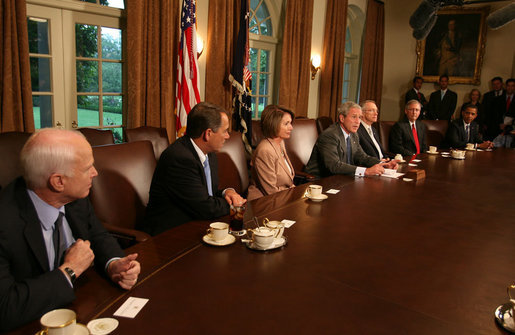
President Bush meets with congressional members, including presidential candidates John McCain and Barack Obama, at the White House to discuss the bailout, September 25, 2008.

Consultations among Treasury Secretary Henry Paulson, Chairman of the Federal Reserve Ben Bernanke, U.S. Securities and Exchange Commission chairman Christopher Cox, congressional leaders, and President Bush, moved forward efforts to draft a proposal for a comprehensive solution to the problems created by illiquid assets. News of the coming plan resulted in some stock, bond, and currency markets stability on September 19, 2008.

The proposal called for the federal government to buy up to US$700 billion of illiquid mortgage-backed securities with the intent to increase the liquidity of the secondary mortgage markets and reduce potential losses encountered by financial institutions owning the securities. The draft proposal was received favorably by investors in the stock market, but caused the U.S. dollar to fall against gold, the Euro, and petroleum. The plan was not immediately approved by Congress; debate and amendments were seen as likely before the plan was to receive legislative enactment.

Throughout the week of September 20, 2008, there was contentious wrangling among members of Congress over the terms and scope of the bailout, amplified by continued failures of institutions like Washington Mutual, and the upcoming November 4 national election.

- On September 21, Paulson announced that the original proposal, which would have excluded foreign banks, had been revised to include foreign financial institutions with a presence in the United States. The U.S. administration pressured other countries to set up similar bailout plans.
- On September 23, the plan was presented by Paulson and Bernanke to the Senate Banking Committee, who rejected it as unacceptable.
- On September 24, President Bush addressed the nation on prime time television, describing how serious the 2008 financial crisis could become if action was not taken promptly by Congress.
- Also on September 24, 2008, Republican Party nominee for President, John McCain, and Democratic Party nominee for President, Barack Obama, issued a joint statement describing their shared view that "The effort to protect the American economy must not fail."

The plan was introduced on September 20, by Paulson. Named the Troubled Asset Relief Program, but also known as the Paulson Proposal or Paulson Plan, it should not be confused with Paulson's earlier 212-page plan, the Blueprint for a Modernized Financial Regulatory Reform, that was released on March 31, 2008.

The proposal was only three pages long, intentionally short on details to facilitate quick passage by Congress.

=== Mortgage asset purchases ===
A key part of the proposal is the federal government's plan to buy up to $700 billion of illiquid mortgage-backed securities (MBS) with the intent to increase the liquidity of the secondary mortgage markets and reduce potential losses encountered by financial institutions owning the securities. The draft proposal of the plan was received favorably by investors in the stock market.

This plan can be described as a risky investment, as opposed to an expense. The MBS within the scope of the purchase program have rights to the cash flows from the underlying mortgages. As such, the initial outflow of government funds to purchase the MBS would be offset by ongoing cash inflows represented by the monthly mortgage payments. Further, the government eventually may be able to sell the assets, though whether at a gain or loss will remain to be seen. While incremental borrowing to obtain the funds necessary to purchase the MBS may add to the United States public debt, the net effect will be considerably less as the incremental debt will be offset to a large extent by the MBS assets.

A key challenge would be valuing the purchase price of the MBS, which is a complex exercise subject to a multitude of variables related to the housing market and the credit quality of the underlying mortgages. The ability of the government to offset the purchase price (through mortgage collections over the long-run) depends on the valuation assigned to the MBS at the time of purchase. For example, Merrill Lynch wrote down the value of its MBS to approximately 22 cents on the dollar in Q2 2008. Whether the government is ultimately able to resell the assets above the purchase price or will continue to merely collect the mortgage payments is an open item.

On February 10, 2009, the newly confirmed Secretary of the Treasury Timothy Geithner outlined his plan to use the $300 billion (~$437 billion in 2025) or so dollars remaining in the TARP funds. He mentioned that the U.S. Treasury and Federal Reserve wanted to help fund private investors to buy toxic assets from banks, but few details have yet been released. There is still some skepticism about the premise that taxpayers can buy troubled assets without having to overpay. Oppenheimer & Company analyst Meridith Whitney argues that banks will not sell bad assets at fair market values because they are reluctant to take asset write downs. Removing toxic assets would also reduce the volatility of banks' stock prices. Because stock is a call option on a firm's assets, this lost volatility will hurt the stock price of distressed banks. Therefore, such banks will only sell toxic assets at above market prices.

On April 6, 2008, the State Foreclosure Prevention Working Group reported that the pace of foreclosures exceeded the capacity of homeowner rescue programs, such as the Hope Now Alliance, in the first quarter of 2008.

=== Sweeping powers ===
The original plan would have granted the Secretary of the Treasury unlimited power to spend, proofing their actions against congressional or judicial review. Section 8 of the Paulson proposal states: "Decisions by the Secretary pursuant to the authority of this Act are non-reviewable and committed to agency discretion, and may not be reviewed by any court of law or any administrative agency." This provision was not included in the final version.

== Rationale for the bailout ==
=== Government officials ===
In his testimony before the U.S. Senate, Treasury Secretary Henry Paulson summarized the rationale for the $700 billion (~$1.03 trillion in 2025) bailout:

- Stabilize the economy: "We must... avoid a continuing series of financial institution failures and frozen credit markets that threaten American families' financial well-being, the viability of businesses both small and large, and the very health of our economy."
- Improve liquidity: "These bad loans have created a chain reaction and last week our credit markets froze – even some Main Street non-financial companies had trouble financing their normal business operations. If that situation were to persist, it would threaten all parts of our economy."
- Comprehensive strategy: "We must now take further, decisive action to fundamentally and comprehensively address the root cause of this turmoil. And that root cause is the housing correction which has resulted in illiquid mortgage-related assets that are choking off the flow of credit which is so vitally important to our economy. We must address this underlying problem, and restore confidence in our financial markets and financial institutions so they can perform their mission of supporting future prosperity and growth."
- Immediate and significant: "This troubled asset relief program has to be properly designed for immediate implementation and be sufficiently large to have maximum impact and restore market confidence. It must also protect the taxpayer to the maximum extent possible, and include provisions that ensure transparency and oversight while also ensuring the program can be implemented quickly and run effectively."
- Broad impact: "This troubled asset purchase program on its own is the single most effective thing we can do to help homeowners, the American people and stimulate our economy."

In his testimony before the U.S. Senate on September 23, 2008, Fed Chairman Ben Bernanke also summarized the rationale for the $700 billion (~$1.03 trillion in 2025) bailout:

- Investor confidence: "Among the firms under the greatest pressure were Fannie Mae and Freddie Mac, Lehman Brothers, and, more recently, American International Group (AIG). As investors lost confidence in them, these companies saw their access to liquidity and capital markets increasingly impaired and their stock prices drop sharply." He also stated: "Purchasing impaired assets will create liquidity and promote price discovery in the markets for these assets, while reducing investor uncertainty about the current value and prospects of financial institutions. More generally, removing these assets from institutions' balance sheets will help to restore confidence in our financial markets and enable banks and other institutions to raise capital and to expand credit to support economic growth."
- Impact on the economy and GDP: "Extraordinarily turbulent conditions in global financial markets... these conditions caused equity prices to fall sharply, the cost of short-term credit—where available—to spike upward, and liquidity to dry up in many markets. Losses at a large money market mutual fund sparked extensive withdrawals from a number of such funds. A marked increase in the demand for safe assets—a flight to quality—sent the yield on Treasury bills down to a few hundredths of a percent. By further reducing asset values and potentially restricting the flow of credit to households and businesses, these developments pose a direct threat to economic growth."

Regarding the $700 billion number, Forbes.com quoted a Treasury spokeswoman: "It's not based on any particular data point. We just wanted to choose a really large number."

=== Journalists ===
According to CNBC commentator Jim Cramer, large corporations, institutions, and wealthy investors were pulling their money out of bank money market funds, in favor of government-backed Treasury bills. Cramer called it "an invisible run on the banks", one that has no lines in the lobby but pushes banks to the breaking point nonetheless. As a bank's capital reserve of deposits evaporate, so too does its ability to lend and correspondingly make money. "The lack of confidence inspired by Lehman's demise, the general poor health of many banks, this is going to turn this into an intractable moment," Cramer said, "if someone in the government doesn't start pushing for more deposit insurance."

== Reaction to the initial proposal ==
Skepticism regarding the plan occurred early on in the House. Many members of Congress, including the House of Representatives, did not support the plan initially, mainly conservative free-market Republicans and liberal anti-corporate Democrats. Alabama Republican Spencer Bachus has called the proposal "a gun to our head".

=== Immediate market reactions ===
On September 19, 2008, when news of the bailout proposal emerged, the U.S. stock market rose by 3%. Foreign stock markets also surged, and foreign currencies corrected slightly, after having dropped earlier in the month. The value of the U.S. dollar dropped compared to other world currencies after the plan was announced. The front end oil futures contract spiked more than $25 a barrel during the day Monday September 22, ending the day up over $16. This was a record for the biggest one-day gain. However, there are other factors that caused the massive spike in oil prices. Traders who got "caught" at the end of the October contract session were forced to purchase oil in large batches to cover themselves, adding to the surge in prices. Further out, oil futures contracts rose by about $5 (~$7.00 in 2025) per barrel. Mortgage rates increased following the news of the bailout plan. The 30-year fixed-rate mortgage averaged 5.78% in the week before the plan was announced; for the week ending September 25, the average rate was 6.09%, still far below the average rate during the early 1990s recession, when it topped 9.0%.

=== Potential conflict of interest ===
There was concern that the current plan created a conflict of interest for Paulson. Paulson was a former CEO of Goldman Sachs, which stood to benefit from the bailout. Paulson had hired Goldman executives as advisors and Paulson's former advisors had joined banks that were also to benefit from the bailout. Furthermore, the original proposal exempted Paulson from judicial oversight. Thus, there was concern that former illegal activity by a financial institution or its executives might be hidden.

The Treasury staff member responsible for administering the bailout funds was Neel Kashkari, a former vice-president at Goldman Sachs.

In the Senate, Senator Judd Gregg (R-NH) was the leading Republican author of the TARP program while he had a multimillion-dollar investment in the Bank of America.

=== Views from the public, politicians, financiers, economists, and journalists ===
==== The public ====
Protests opposing the bailout occurred in over 100 cities across the United States on Thursday September 25. Grassroots group TrueMajority said its members organized over 251 events in more than 41 states. The largest gathering has been in New York City, where more than 1,000 protesters gathered near the New York Stock Exchange along with labor union members organized by New York Central Labor Council. Other grassroots groups have planned rallies to protest against the bailout, while outraged citizens continue to express their opposition online through blogs and dedicated web sites.

- In a survey conducted September 19–22 by the Pew Research Center, by a margin of 57 percent to 30 percent, Americans supported the bailout when asked "As you may know, the government is potentially investing billions to try and keep financial institutions and markets secure. Do you think this is the right thing or the wrong thing for the government to be doing?"
- In a survey conducted September 19–22 by Bloomberg/Los Angeles Times, by a margin of 55 percent to 31 percent, Americans opposed the bailout when asked whether "the government should use taxpayers' dollars to rescue ailing private financial firms whose collapse could have adverse effects on the economy and market, or is it not the government's responsibility to bail out private companies with taxpayers' dollars?".
- In a survey conducted September 24 by USA Today/Gallup, when asked "As you may know, the Bush administration has proposed a plan that would allow the Treasury Department to buy and re-sell up to $700 billion of distressed assets from financial companies. What would you like to see Congress do?", 56 percent of respondents wanted Congress to pass a plan different from the original Paulson proposal, 22 percent supported the Paulson proposal in its initial form, and 11 percent wanted Congress to take no action.
- Senator Sherrod Brown said he had been getting 2,000 e-mail messages and telephone calls a day, roughly 95 percent opposed.
- As of Thursday September 25, Senator Dianne Feinstein's (D-Calif.) offices had received a total of 39,180 e-mails, calls. and letters on the bailout, with the overwhelming majority of constituents against it.

==== Politicians ====
Then-senator Barack Obama addresses the Senate on the 2008 financial crisis and argues in favor of the bailout bill. View clip on commons. "Barack Obama support of Bailout". Archived from the original on December 23, 2008.

Supporters of the plan included presidential candidates Barack Obama and John McCain, and British Prime Minister Gordon Brown.

Critics included Senator Bernie Sanders, Former Arkansas governor Mike Huckabee, Congressman Ron Paul, Libertarian presidential candidate Bob Barr, and senators Christopher Dodd, Richard Shelby, and Jim Bunning.

In a Wall Street Journal opinion piece, Senator Hillary Clinton advocated addressing the rate of mortgage defaults and foreclosures that ignited this crisis, not just bailing out Wall Street firms: "If we do not take action to address the crisis facing borrowers, we'll never solve the crisis facing lenders." She proposed a new Home Owners' Loan Corporation (HOLC), similar to that used after the Depression and which was launched in 1933. The new HOLC was to administer a national program to help homeowners refinance their mortgages. She also called for a moratorium on foreclosures and freezing of rate hikes in adjustable-rate mortgages.

Barack Obama, the Democratic presidential candidate, said that any bailout had to include plans to recover the money, protect working families and big financial institutions, and be crafted to prevent such a crisis from happening again.

==== Financiers ====
Former Federal Reserve chairman Alan Greenspan supported the Paulson plan.

Investor Warren Buffett says he could put in $10B plus $90B nonrecourse debt; that is, without having to repay beyond $10B if mortgages did not repay. (This is 10 to 1 leverage, 10 times upside with 1 times downside.) He also said that the government should pay market price, which may be below the carry value. Buffett says "I would think they might insist on the directors of the institutions that participate in this program waiving all director's fees for a couple of years. They should, maybe, eliminate bonuses." Buffett says "if someone wants to sell a hundred billion of these instruments to the Treasury, let them sell two or three billion in the market and then have the Treasury match that, ... . You don't want the Treasury to be a patsy." Mr. Buffett's company owns financial companies which will benefit directly or indirectly.

Investor George Soros opposed the original Paulson plan: "Mr Paulson's proposal to purchase distressed mortgage-related securities poses a classic problem of asymmetric information. The securities are hard to value but the sellers know more about them than the buyer: in any auction process the Treasury would end up with the dregs. The proposal is also rife with latent conflict of interest issues. Unless the Treasury overpays for the securities, the scheme would not bring relief." – but called Barack Obama's list of conditions for the plan "the right principles".

Other critics included Carl Icahn Jim Rogers, and William Seidman. Seidman compared the bailout with action he and his team at the Resolution Trust Corporation took during the savings and loan crisis of the 1980s: "What we did, we took over the bank, nationalized it, fired the management, took out the bad assets and put a good bank back in the system."

==== Economists ====
- In an open letter sent to Congress on September 24, over 100 university economists expressed "great concern for the plan proposed by Treasury Secretary Paulson". The letter, endorsed within a few days by 231 economists at American universities, has been described as "the emerging consensus from academic economists". Its authors described three "fatal pitfalls" they perceived in the plan as it was initially proposed:
  1. Its fairness. The plan is a subsidy to investors at taxpayers' expense. Investors who took risks to earn profits must also bear the losses. [...] The government can ensure a well-functioning financial industry [...] without bailing out particular investors and institutions whose choices proved unwise.
  2. Its ambiguity. Neither the mission of the new agency nor its oversight are clear. If taxpayers are to buy illiquid and opaque assets from troubled sellers, the terms, occasions, and methods of such purchases must be crystal clear ahead of time and carefully monitored afterwards.
  3. Its long-term effects. If the plan is enacted, its effects will be with us for a generation. For all their recent troubles, America's dynamic and innovative private capital markets have brought the nation unparalleled prosperity. Fundamentally weakening those markets in order to calm short-run disruptions is desperately short-sighted.
- Nobel Prize-winning economist Joseph Stiglitz strongly criticized the bill in an article written for The Nation.
- Economist, New York Times columnist and Nobel laureate Paul Krugman recommended that, instead of purchasing the assets, equity capital could be provided to the banks directly in exchange for preferred stock. This would strengthen the financial position of the banks, encouraging them to lend. Dividends would be paid to the government on the preferred shares. This would be similar to what happened during the savings and loan crisis and with the GSE bailout. This avoids the valuation questions involved in the direct purchase of MBS. This is an approach based on the 1990s Swedish banking rescue.
- The first half of the bailout money was primarily used to buy preferred stock in banks instead of troubled mortgage assets. This has led some economists to argue that buying preferred stock will be far less effective in getting banks to lend efficiently than buying common stock.
- Soon after, a study published in 2009 shows that market's reaction to the announcement of a rescue plan is positive independently to the type of the intervention. It indicates that a timely bad plan could be better than an untimely good one.

In hindsight, economists generally agree that unemployment would have been significantly higher without the program.

==== Journalists ====
- The Economist magazine said that although "Mr Paulson's plan is not perfect ... it is good enough" and that "Congress should pass it—and soon."
- "The deal proposed by Paulson is nothing short of outrageous. It includes no oversight of his own closed-door operations. It merely gives congressional blessing and funding to what he has already been doing, ad hoc." - Robert Kuttner
- Journalist Rosalind Resnick favors a hypothetical scenario in which "consumers and businesses would be able to borrow at the fed funds rate at 2 percent, just like the big banks do. This means that every cash-strapped homeowner would be able to refinance his mortgage and cut his payments in half, saving thousands of homes from foreclosure. Consumers could also refinance their credit card balances, auto loans and other debt at interest rates they can afford" and that this plan "would cost U.S. taxpayers absolutely nothing".

== Alternative proposals ==
Suggested alternative approaches to address the issues underlying the 2008 financial crisis included: mortgage assistance proposals try to increase the value of the asset base while limiting the disruption of foreclosure; bank recapitalization through equity investment by the government; asset liquidity approaches to engage market mechanisms for valuing troubled assets; and financial market reforms promoting transparency and conservatism to restore trust by market investors.

=== Mortgage assistance ===
- Conservative Republican Representatives offered a mortgage insurance plan as an alternative to the bailout. There had been speculation that U.S. Senator John McCain may have supported this plan but this was not confirmed.
- Senator Hillary Clinton proposed a new Home Owners' Loan Corporation (HOLC), similar to that used after the Depression, which was launched in 1933. The new HOLC would administer a national program to help homeowners refinance their mortgages. She also called for a moratorium on foreclosures and freezing of rate hikes in adjustable rate mortgages.
- Jonathan Koppell, Associate Professor of Politics and Management at the Yale School of Management, recommended assisting homeowners by lowering interest rates on loans in default. The money spent would be repaid from profits when the homes eventually sell after the housing market has recovered.

=== Bank recapitalization ===
- A ten-point plan by New York University economist Nouriel Roubini went beyond a Home Owners' Loan Corporation to include recreating a combination of a Resolution Trust Corporation, and a Reconstruction Finance Corporation. Roubini has advocated bank recapitalization (by providing cash in exchange for preferred shares) and suspending all dividend payments.
- Economist Paul Krugman recommended equity investments in the banks, an approach similar to what happened during the S&L crisis, the GSE bailout, and the 1990s Swedish banking rescue. This avoids the valuation questions involved in the direct purchase of MBS.
- The first half of the bailout money was primarily used to buy preferred stock in banks instead of troubled mortgage assets. This has led some economists to argue that buying preferred stock will be far less effective than buying common stock.
- Luigi Zingales, Professor of Entrepreneurship and Finance at the University of Chicago, proposed a special chapter of the bankruptcy code to convert banks' debt to equity which would improve capital adequacy ratios and enable a return to lending.
- Janet Tavakoli, a financial consultant and a former adjunct professor of derivatives at the University of Chicago's Graduate School of Business, criticized the bailout because in her view it hides problems and continues price uncertainty. She also advocates forced restructuring, with a combination of debt forgiveness and debt for equity swaps, rather than a bailout.

=== Asset liquidity ===
- Christopher Ricciardi, former Merrill Lynch banker, wrote a letter to Secretary Paulson proposing alternatively that the government should be backing some troubled assets to encourage private investors to purchase them — as opposed to the direct purchase of troubled assets from financial institutions.
- Investor Warren Buffett believed the government should pay market price for the assets rather than an artificially high hold-to-maturity price. The market price would be determined by selling a portion of the assets to private investors.

=== Financial market reform ===
- Dominique Strauss-Kahn, Managing Director of the International Monetary Fund, recommended three near-term actions to assist banks: provision of liquidity, purchase of distressed assets, and recapitalization. In addition, he argued for addressing the structural issues with more prudential regulation, better accounting rules, and more transparency.

=== Monetary consensus reform ===
This process consisted of nationalizing most of the private industries. The short-term effects were evidently costly, but the beneficiary repercussions were vastly favorable to a sustainable economic future.

1. Nationalize the federal reserve.
2. Deregulate the corporate image of the United States.
3. The rest of the proposal were equated with different variables and would have been acted upon according to the circumstances.

According to Jon Daemon, the proposal was dismissed by bureaucrats and lobbyist in accordance to the private banks and federal reserve dispatchers.

== Legislative history ==
Over the weekend (September 27–28), Congress continued to develop the proposal. That next Monday, the House put the resulting effort, the Emergency Economic Stabilization Act of 2008, to a vote. It did not pass. US stock markets dropped 8 percent, the largest percentage drop since Black Monday in 1987.

Congressional leaders, including both presidential candidates, started working with the Bush Administration and the Treasury department on key negotiation points as they worked to finalize the plan. Key items under discussion included:

- Additional foreclosure avoidance and homeowner assistance
- Executive pay limits
- Government equity interests in firms participating in program, to provide additional taxpayer protection
- Judicial review, Congressional oversight and right to audit
- Structure and authority of the entities that will manage the program

=== First House vote, September 29 ===
Just after midnight Sunday, September 28, leaders of the Senate and House, along with Treasury Secretary Paulson, announced a tentative deal had been reached to permit the government purchase of up to $700 billion in mortgage backed securities to provide liquidity to the security holders, and to stabilize U.S. financial firms and markets. The bill was made final later that Monday morning. A debate and vote was scheduled for the House for Monday, September 29, to be followed by a Senate debate on Wednesday. In an early morning news conference, on Monday September 29, President George W. Bush expressed confidence that the bill would pass Congress, and that it would provide relief to the U.S. economy. A number of House Republicans remained opposed to the deal and intended to vote against it.

That same day, the legislation for the bailout was put before the United States House of Representatives and failed 205–228, with one not voting. Democrats voted 140–95 in favor of the legislation, while Republicans voted 133–65 against it. During the legislative session, at the conclusion of the vote, the presiding chair declared the measure, HR3997, to be unfinished business.

House Speaker Nancy Pelosi said at a press conference after the vote: "The legislation has failed. The crisis has not gone away. We must continue to work in a bipartisan manner." Senate Banking Committee chairman Christopher Dodd, a Connecticut Democrat, appearing at a joint press conference with Senator Judd Gregg, a New Hampshire Republican, said a bailout plan could still pass Congress. Dodd said: "We don't intend to leave here without the job being done. While it may take another few days, we're confident that can happen."

==== Market reaction to September 29 vote ====
Following the House vote, the Dow Jones Industrial Average dropped over 777 points in a single day, its largest single-day point drop until 2018. The $1.2 trillion loss in market value received much media attention, although it still does not rank among the index's ten largest drops in percentage terms. The S & P lost 8.8%, its seventh worst day in percentage terms and its worst day since Black Monday in 1987. The NASDAQ composite also had its worst day since Black Monday, losing 9.1% in its third worst day ever. The TED spread, the difference between what banks charge each other for a three-month loan and what the Treasury charges, hit a 26-year high of 3.58%; a higher rate for inter bank loans than Treasury loans is a sign that banks fear that their fellow banks won't be able to pay off their debts. Meanwhile, the price of U.S. light crude oil for November delivery fell $10.52 to $96.37 a barrel, its second largest one-day drop ever, on expectations of an economic slowdown reducing oil consumption and demand. The Dow Jones industrial average recovered 485 points or about 62% of the entire loss the very next day.

Markets, which had expected the bill to pass and had moved on to debating whether it would be sufficient, were already skittish after news that Wachovia Bank was being bought out by Citigroup to avoid collapse. The events were compounded by news from Europe that Dutch-Belgian Fortis Bank was given a $16.4 billion lifeline to avoid collapse, failing British bank Bradford & Bingley was nationalized, and Germany extended banking and real estate giant Hypo Real Estate billions to ensure its survival.

Later in October, after the bill had been passed, the Dow Jones Industrial Average would drop by more in percentage terms, and market volatility remained at historically high levels, as measured by the VIX.

=== Senate vote October 1 ===
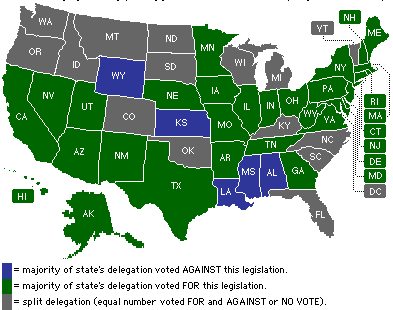
74 yea – 21 nay

On Wednesday evening, October 1, 2008, the Senate debated and voted on a revised version of the Emergency Economic Stabilization Act of 2008 (EESA 2008). The legislation was framed as an amendment to HR1424, substituting the entire bill with the newly revised text of the EESA 2008. The amendment was approved by a 74–25 vote, and the entire bill was also passed by the same margin, 74–25 (R: 34-15, D: 40-10). Only cancer-stricken Senator Ted Kennedy did not vote. Under the legislative rule for the bill, sixty votes were required to approve the amendment and the bill. A House leader accused the Senate of legislating "by blunt force" without public consent.

Describing the Senate's reason for passing the bill, former Senator Evan Bayh "described a scene from 2008 where Ben Bernanke warned senators that the sky would collapse if the banks weren't rescued. 'We looked at each other,' said Bayh, 'and said, okay, what do we need.'"

=== Second House vote, October 3 ===
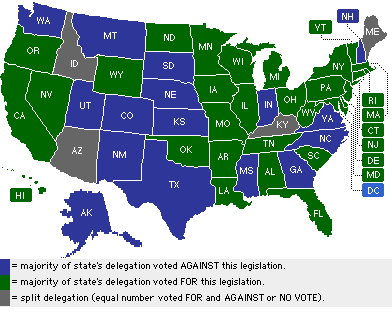
263 yea – 171 nay

The revised HR1424 was received from the Senate by the House, and on October 3, it voted 263-171 to enact the bill into law. Democrats voted 172 to 63 in favor of the legislation, while Republicans voted 108 to 91 against it; overall, 33 Democrats and 24 Republicans who had previously voted against the bill supported it on the second vote.

President Bush signed the bill into law within hours of its enactment, creating a $700 billion dollar Treasury fund to purchase failing bank assets.

The revised plan left the $700 billion bailout intact and appended a stalled tax bill. The law has three major divisions, Division A: the Emergency Economic Stabilization Act of 2008; Division B: Energy Improvement and Extension Act of 2008, and Division C: the Tax Extenders and Alternative Minimum Tax Relief Act of 2008. The tax part of the law has provisions that will have a net expenditure of $100 billion over 10 years. It had been stalled due to a disagreement between Democrats that did not want to increase spending without a corresponding increase in taxes and Republicans, who were adamantly opposed to any tax increases.

== Key items in the legislation ==
On October 3, 2008, the Emergency Economic Stabilization Act became law with the signing of Public Law 110-343, which included the act. Below is a list of key items and how the legislation deals with them.

=== Interest on bank deposits held by the Federal Reserve ===
Reserve balances began increasing at the beginning of September 2008, just after the Democratic and Republican national conventions, and just before the bankruptcy of Lehman Brothers and the presidential debates.

Although the original bill proposed as late as September 20 contained no such provision, Section 128 of the Act allowed the Federal Reserve System (the Fed) to begin paying banks a high interest rate on their deposits held for reserve requirements. It reads:

Sec. 128. Acceleration of Effective Date.

Section 203 of the Financial Services Regulatory Relief Act of 2006 (12 U.S.C. 461) is amended by striking `October 1, 2011' and inserting `October 1, 2008'.

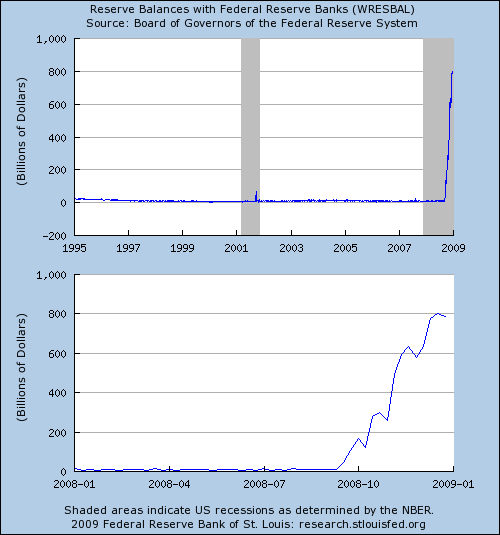
Reserve balances with U.S. Federal Reserve Banks, 1995-2008 and 2008, in billions of U.S. dollars

The Fed announced that it would begin paying such increased interest on both reserve and excess reserve balances on October 6, 2008. Banks immediately increased the amount of their money on deposit with the Fed, up from about $10 billion total at the end of August 2008, to $880 billion by the end of the second week of January 2009. In comparison, the increase in reserve balances reached only $65 billion (~$113 billion in 2025) after September 11, 2001, before falling back to normal levels within a month. The U.S. Treasury Department explained the changes, saying:

The Federal Reserve will continue to take a leadership role with respect to liquidity in our markets. It is committed to using all of the tools at its disposal to provide the increased liquidity that is now required for the effective functioning of financial markets. In this regard, the authority to pay interest on reserves that was provided by EESA is essential, because it allows the Federal Reserve to expand its balance sheet as necessary to support financial stability while conducting a monetary policy that promotes the Federal Reserve's macroeconomic objectives of maximum employment and stable prices. The Federal Reserve and the Treasury Department are consulting with market participants on ways to provide additional support for term unsecured funding markets.

Reactions to the change were mixed, with banks generally approving of their new ability to earn high interest without risk on funds that they would otherwise need to use to extend credit in order to make a profit for their shareholders, while those involved in the commercial paper markets, the primary and secondary sectors of the goods and services economy, shipping, and others depending on the liquidity of credit from banks were more skeptical of the further pressure against credit availability in the midst of the ongoing credit liquidity crisis.

The day after the change was announced, on October 7, Fed Chairman Ben Bernanke expressed some confusion about it, saying, "We're not quite sure what we have to pay in order to get the market rate, which includes some credit risk, up to the target. We're going to experiment with this and try to find what the right spread is." The Fed adjusted the rate on October 22, after the initial rate they set October 6 failed to keep the benchmark U.S. overnight interest rate close to their policy target, and again on November 5 for the same reason. Beginning December 18, the Fed directly established interest rates paid on required reserve balances and excess balances instead of specifying them with a formula based on the target federal funds rate.

The government issued $400 billion of short-term debt intended to help replace the $1.8 trillion commercial paper market which was wiped out by the change, (exacerbated by money market funds' sudden refusal to support commercial paper as well) but the world economy began to deflate as international shipping, dependent on commercial paper, slowed in some regions to a few percent of levels prior to the change. The FDIC announced a new program on October 14, under which newly issued senior unsecured debt issued on or before June 30, 2009, would be fully protected in the event the issuing institution subsequently fails, or its holding company files for bankruptcy. The FDIC program is expected to cover about $1.4 (~$2.04 trillion in 2025) trillion of bank debt.

The Congressional Budget Office estimated that payment of interest on reserve balances would cost the American taxpayers about one tenth of the present 0.25% interest rate on $800 billion in deposits:

Estimated budgetary effects
Year	2006	2007	2008	2009	2010	2011	2012	2013	2014	2015	2016
Millions of dollars	0	-192	-192	-202	-212	-221	-242	-253	-266	-293	-308
(Negative numbers represent expenditures; losses in revenue not included.)

Those expenditures pale in comparison to the lost tax revenues worldwide resulting from decreasing economic activity due to damage to the short-term commercial paper and associated credit markets.

On January 7, 2009, the Federal Open Market Committee decided that, "the size of the balance sheet and level of excess reserves would need to be reduced." On January 13, Ben Bernanke said, "In principle, the interest rate the Fed pays on bank reserves should set a floor on the overnight interest rate, as banks should be unwilling to lend reserves at a rate lower than they can receive from the Fed. In practice, the federal funds rate has fallen somewhat below the interest rate on reserves in recent months, reflecting the very high volume of excess reserves, the inexperience of banks with the new regime, and other factors. However, as excess reserves decline, financial conditions normalize, and banks adapt to the new regime, we expect the interest rate paid on reserves to become an effective instrument for controlling the federal funds rate." The same day, Financial Week said Mr. Bernanke admitted that a huge increase in banks' excess reserves is stifling the Fed's monetary policy moves and its efforts to revive private sector lending.

On January 15, Chicago Fed president and Federal Open Market Committee member Charles Evans said, "once the economy recovers and financial conditions stabilize, the Fed will return to its traditional focus on the federal funds rate. It also will have to scale back the use of emergency lending programs and reduce the size of the balance sheet and level of excess reserves. 'Some of this scaling back will occur naturally as market conditions improve on account of how these programs have been designed. Still, financial market participants need to be prepared for the eventual dismantling of the facilities that have been put in place during the financial turmoil,' he said."

At the end of January 2009, excess reserve balances at the Fed stood at $793 billion but less than two weeks later on February 11, total reserve balances had fallen to $603 billion. On April 1, reserve balances had again increased to $806 billion, and late November 2009, they stood at $1.16 trillion.

=== Management of the Troubled Asset Relief Program ===
The bill authorizes the secretary of the treasury to establish the Troubled Assets Relief Program to purchase troubled assets from financial institutions. The Office of Financial Stability is created within the Treasury Department as the agency through which the secretary will run the program. The secretary is required to consult with the Board of Governors of the Federal Reserve System, the Federal Deposit Insurance Corporation, the comptroller of the currency, the director of the Office of Thrift Supervision, and the secretary of housing and urban development when running the program.

==== Funding ====
The bill authorizes $700 billion for the program. The treasury secretary has immediate access to the first $250 billion. Following that, an additional $100 billion can be authorized by the president. For the last $350 billion, the President must notify Congress of the intention to grant the additional funding to the Treasury; Congress then has 15 days to pass a resolution disallowing the authority. If Congress fails to pass a resolution opposing the funding within 15 days, or if the resolution passes, but is vetoed by the President, and Congress does not have enough votes to override the veto, the Treasury will receive the final $350 billion (~$513 billion in 2025).

==== Government equity interests in participating firms ====
The treasury Sscretary is required to obtain a financial warrant guaranteeing the right to purchase non-voting stock or, if the company is unable to issue a warrant, senior debt from any firm participating in the program. The Secretary is allowed to make a de minimis exception to the rule, but that exception may not exceed $100 million.

==== Executive pay limits ====
If the Treasury purchases assets directly from a company, and also receives a meaningful equity or debt position in that company, the company is not allowed to offer incentives that encourage "unnecessary and excessive risks" to its senior executives (that is, the top five executives). Also, the company is prohibited from making golden parachute payments to a senior executive. Both of these prohibitions expire when the Treasury no longer holds an equity or debt position in that company. The company also is given "clawback" permission; that is, the opportunity to recover senior executive bonus or incentive pay based on earnings, gains, or other data that proves to be inaccurate.

If the Treasury purchases assets via auction, and that purchase exceeds $300 million, any new employment contract for a senior officer may not include a golden parachute provision in the case of involuntary termination, bankruptcy filing, insolvency, or receivership. This prohibition only applies to future contracts; golden parachutes already in place will remain unaffected.

In either scenario, no limits are placed on executive salary, and existing golden parachutes will not be altered.

==== Foreclosure avoidance and homeowner assistance ====
For mortgages involved in assets purchased by the Treasury Department, the treasury secretary is required to (1) implement a plan that seeks to maximize assistance for homeowners, and (2) encourage the servicers of the underlying mortgages to take advantage of the HOPE for Homeowners Program of the National Housing Act or other available programs to minimize foreclosures. Furthermore, the Secretary is allowed to use loan guarantees and credit enhancements to encourage loan modifications to avert foreclosure. The bill does not provide a mechanism to change the terms of a mortgage without the consent of any company holding a stake in that mortgage. Section 110: Assistance to Homeowners of the Emergency Economic Stabilization Act of 2008 "requires federal entities that hold mortgages and mortgage-backed securities to develop plans to minimize foreclosures".

This $24 billion (~$35.2 billion in 2025) asset detoxification plan was requested by Federal Deposit Insurance Corporation Chair Sheila Bair, but the Treasury did not use the provision. "The primary purpose of the bill was to protect our financial system from collapse," Secretary Henry Paulson told the House Financial Services Committee, "The rescue package was not intended to be an economic stimulus or an economic recovery package."

==== Judicial review ====
The bill establishes that actions taken by the Treasury Secretary regarding this program are subject to judicial review, reversing the request for immunity made in the original Paulson proposal.

==== Oversight ====
Several oversight mechanisms are established by the bill. Contractors were also used to help manage the TARP funds.

The Financial Stability Oversight Board is created to review and make recommendations regarding the Treasury's actions. The members of the board are:

- Chairman of the Board of the Federal Reserve
- Secretary of the Treasury
- Director of the Federal Housing Finance Agency
- Chairman of the Securities and Exchange Commission
- Secretary of the Department of Housing and Urban Development

A Congressional Oversight Panel is created by the bill to review the state of the markets, current regulatory system, and the Treasury Department's management of the Troubled Asset Relief Program. The panel is required to report their findings to Congress every 30 days, counting from the first asset purchase made under the program. The panel must also submit a special report to Congress about regulatory reform on or before January 20, 2009.

The panel consists of five outside experts appointed as follows:

- One member chosen by the speaker of the House
- One member chosen by the minority leader of the House
- One member chosen by the majority leader of the Senate
- One member chosen by the minority leader of the Senate
- One member chosen by the Speaker of the House and the majority leader of the Senate, following consultation with the minority leaders of Congress

The comptroller general (director of the Government Accountability Office) is required to monitor the performance of the program, and report findings to Congress every 60 days. The Comptroller General is also required to audit the program annually. The bill grants the Comptroller General access to all information, records, reports, data, etc. belonging to or in use by the program.

The bill creates the Office of the Special Inspector General for the Troubled Asset Relief Program, appointed by the president and confirmed by the Senate. The special inspector general's purpose is to monitor, audit and investigate the activities of the Treasury in the administration of the program, and report findings to Congress every quarter.

=== FDIC insurance ===
From the date of enactment of the bill (October 3, 2008) until December 31, 2009, the amount of deposit insurance provided by the FDIC is increased from $100,000 to $250,000.

=== Budget-related provisions ===
Title II sets out guidelines for consultation and reporting between the treasury secretary, the Office of Management and Budget, and the Congressional Budget Office.

=== Tax provisions ===
The bill makes the following changes to tax law.

- Qualified financial institutions may count losses on FNMA and FHLMC preferred stock against ordinary income, rather than capital gain income.
- New limitations are added on deductibility of executive compensation by corporations participating in the bailout.
- The mortgage debt forgiveness provision of the Mortgage Forgiveness Debt Relief Act of 2007 is extended by three years, so that it applies to debts forgiven through the year 2012.
- Extend the expiration date of the section 41 Research & Development Tax Credit from December 31, 2007, to December 31, 2009; also, increase the Alternative Simplified Credit percentage from 12% to 14%.

== Administration of the law ==
CAMELS ratings are being used by the United States government to help it decide which banks to provide special help for and which to not as part of its capitalization program authorized by the Emergency Economic Stabilization Act of 2008.

The New York Times states: "The criteria being used to choose who gets money appears to be setting the stage for consolidation in the industry by favoring those most likely to survive" because the criteria appears to favor the financially best off banks and banks too big to let fail. Some lawmakers are upset that the capitalization program will end up culling banks in their districts.

Known aspects of the capitalization program "suggest that the government may be loosely defining what constitutes healthy institutions. [... Banks] that have been profitable over the last year are the most likely to receive capital. Banks that have lost money over the last year, however, must pass additional tests. [...] They are also asking if a bank has enough capital and reserves to withstand severe losses to its construction loan portfolio, nonperforming loans and other troubled assets." Some banks received capital with the understanding the banks would try to find a merger partner. To receive capital under the program banks are also "required to provide a specific business plan for the next two or three years and explain how they plan to deploy the capital".

== Effects on national debt ==
The United States annual budget deficit for fiscal year 2009 surpassed $1 trillion. The original Paulson proposal would lift the United States federal debt ceiling by $700 billion, to $11.3 trillion from $10.6 trillion.

== Other information ==
A review of investor presentations and conference calls by executives of some two dozen US-based banks by The New York Times found that "few [banks] cited lending as a priority. An overwhelming majority saw the bailout program as a no-strings-attached windfall that could be used to pay down debt, acquire other businesses, or invest for the future."
