= Capital Purchase Program =

The Capital Purchase Program (CPP) is an American government preferred stock and equity warrant purchase program conducted by the Office of Financial Stability of the United States Department of the Treasury, as part of Troubled Asset Relief Program (TARP) that was launched in 2008. According to the first congressionally mandated oversight report published by the United States Government Accountability Office (GAO), "[TARP's] primary focus was expected to be the purchase of mortgage-backed securities (MBS) and whole loans... [but] within 2 weeks of enactment... the Treasury announced that it would make $250 billion of the $700 billion available to U.S. financial institutions through purchases of preferred stock." This followed a model initiated by the United Kingdom bank rescue package announced on October 8, 2008.

Because preferred stock is similar to debt in that it gets paid before common stock, some economists have questioned whether the buying of preferred stock by the CPP will be effective in getting banks to lend. Other economists have argued that the capital purchases represent a taxpayer subsidy of unsecured creditors. A review of investor presentations and conference calls by executives of some two dozen US-based banks by the New York Times found that "few [banks] cited lending as a priority. An overwhelming majority saw the bailout program as a no-strings-attached windfall that could be used to pay down debt, acquire other businesses or invest for the future." In a letter to Congress the Director-designate of the National Economic Council Larry Summers said that the Obama administration would place tighter controls on how CPP funds could be used. In particular, the second $350 billion would include restrictions on the payment of common stock dividends and executive compensation. Professor Summers also promised greater disclosure and more attempts to tie the funds to foreclosure mitigation efforts.

On January 16, 2009 the Congressional Budget Office estimated that of the first $247 billion (~$350 billion in 2024) of securities purchased represented 26 percent ($64 billion) subsidy to the banks receiving funds. In his speech on February 10, 2009, the new Secretary of the Treasury Timothy Geithner announced the Capital Assistance Program. This signaled an end to the capital purchase program.

A GAO report from March 2012 gave further details, stating "As of January 31, 2012, the Department of the Treasury (Treasury) had received $211.5 billion from its CPP investments, exceeding the $204.9 billion it had disbursed. Of that amount, $16.7 billion remains outstanding, and most of these investments were concentrated in a relatively small number of institutions. In particular, as of January 31, 2012, 25 institutions accounted for $11.2 billion (~$15.1 billion in 2024), or 67 percent, of outstanding investments. As of November 30, 2011, Treasury estimated that CPP would have a lifetime income of $13.5 billion (~$18.5 billion in 2024) after all institutions exited the program."

== Warrants ==
By March 31, 2009 four banks out of over five hundred had returned their preferred stock obligations. None of the publicly traded banks had yet bought back their warrants owned by the U.S. Treasury by March 31, 2009. According to the terms of the U.S. Treasury's investment, the banks returning funds can either negotiate to buy back the warrants at fair market value, or the U.S. Treasury can sell the warrants to third party investors as soon as feasible. Warrants are call options that add to the number of shares of stock outstanding if they are exercised for a profit. The American Bankers Association (ABA) has lobbied congress to cancel the warrants owned by taxpayers. The call them an "onerous exit fee." Yet, if the Capital Purchase Program warrants of Goldman Sachs are representative, then the Capital Purchase Program warrants were worth between $5 billion and $24 billion as of May 1, 2009. Thus canceling the CPP warrants amounts to a $5-billion-to-$24-billion subsidy to the banking industry at taxpayers' expense. While the ABA wants the CPP warrants to be written off by taxpayers, Goldman Sachs does not hold that view. A representative of Goldman Sachs was quoted as saying "We think that taxpayers should expect a decent return on their investment and look forward to being able to provide just that when we are permitted to return the TARP money."

== First nine financial institutions ==
Nine financial institutions received funds on October 28, 2008. These are:

- Bank of America Corporation
- Bank of New York Mellon Corporation
- Citigroup Incorporated
- Goldman Sachs Group Incorporated
- JPMorgan Chase & Company
- Morgan Stanley
- State Street Corporation
- Wells Fargo and Company
- Merrill Lynch

== Participants ==
The following is a list of 42 other participants in the CPP through purchases made on 14 November 2008 and 21 November 2008:

- Bank of Commerce Holdings
- 1st FS Corporation
- UCBH Holdings, Incorporated
- Northern Trust Corporation
- SunTrust Banks, Incorporated
- Broadway Financial Corporation
- Washington Federal, Incorporated
- BB&T Corporation
- Provident Bancshares Corporation
- Umpqua Holdings Corporation
- Comerica Incorporated
- Regions Financial Corporation
- Capital One Financial Corporation
- First Horizon National Corporation
- Huntington Bancshares
- KeyCorp
- Valley National Bancorp
- Zions Bancorporation
- Marshall & Ilsley Corporation
- U.S. Bancorp
- TCF Financial Corporation
- Ameris Bancorp
- Associated Banc-Corp
- Banner Corp. / Banner Bank
- Boston Private Financial
- Cascade Financial Corporation
- Centerstate Banks of Florida Incorporated
- City National Corporation
- Columbia Banking System Incorporated
- First Community Bancshares Incorporated
- First Community Corporation
- First Niagara Financial Group
- Heritage Commerce CorporationHeritage Financial Corporation
- Hf Financial Corporation
- Nara Bancorp Incorporated
- Pacific Capital Bancorp
- Porter Bancorp Incorporated
- Severn Bancorp Incorporated
- Taylor Capital Group
- Trustmark Corporation
- Webster Financial Corporation
- Western Alliance Bancorporation
