= Blue Monday Crash 2009 =

Banking shares crash in the UK

On Monday, 19 January 2009, a date previously known as Blue Monday, British banking shares collapsed in a rout of selling after Royal Bank of Scotland (RBS) announced the biggest corporate losses in British history. The shares fell over 67% in a single day. Shares in all other British banks suffered heavy losses. The next day Lloyds Banking Group and Barclays fell sharply again. RBS and HSBC continued to fall.

As Gordon Brown set out plans to increase public ownership to 70 percent of what was once one of the world’s biggest financial conglomerates, City investors dumped the shares in a selling frenzy.

== RBS ==
News reports on RBS indicated a £28 billion loss for 2008, and the UK government pledged to increase its stake in the company to 70%.

There was speculation that nationalisation was imminent.

Billions of pounds were wiped from its stock market value despite the Government’s pledge to keep it afloat with more money from the taxpayer.

As Gordon Brown set out plans to increase public ownership to 70 percent of what was once one of the world’s biggest financial conglomerates, City investors dumped the shares in a selling frenzy.

== Share price falls ==
Share prices fell as follows:

=== Monday, 19 January 2009 ===
- RBS ~67%
- Lloyds Banking Group ~ 33%
- Barclays ~10%
- HSBC~6%

=== Tuesday, 20 January 2009 ===
- RBS ~11%
- Lloyds Banking Group ~31%
- Barclays ~17%
- HSBC ~3%

== See also ==
- Black Wednesday
