= Troubled Asset Relief Program =

US government program

The Troubled Asset Relief Program (TARP) is a program of the United States government to purchase toxic assets and equity from financial institutions to strengthen its financial sector that was passed by Congress and signed into law by President George W. Bush. It was a component of the government's measures in 2008 to address the subprime mortgage crisis.

The TARP originally authorized expenditures of $700 billion. The Emergency Economic Stabilization Act of 2008 created the TARP. The Dodd–Frank Wall Street Reform and Consumer Protection Act, signed into law in 2010, reduced the amount authorized to $475 billion (approximately $684 billion in 2025). In its final April 2024 report, the Congressional Budget Office (CBO) stated that total disbursements were $443.5 billion, and estimated the program's total subsidy cost at $31.1 billion, mostly from grants for mortgage programs.

On December 19, 2014, the U.S. Treasury sold its remaining holdings of Ally Financial, essentially ending the program. Through the Treasury, the U.S. government actually booked $15.3 billion in surplus, as it earned $441.7 billion on the $426.4 billion invested.

== Purpose ==
TARP allowed the United States Department of the Treasury to purchase or insure up to $700 billion of "troubled assets," defined as "(A) residential or commercial obligations will be bought, or other instruments that are based on or related to such mortgages, that in each case was originated or issued on or before March 14, 2008, the purchase of which the Secretary determines promotes financial market stability; and (B) any other financial instrument that the Secretary, after consultation with the Chairman of the Board of Governors of the Federal Reserve System, determines the purchase of which is necessary to promote financial market stability, but only upon transmittal of such determination, in writing, to the appropriate committees of Congress".

In short, this allows the Treasury to purchase illiquid, difficult-to-value assets from banks and other financial institutions. The targeted assets can be collateralized debt obligations, which were sold in a booming market until 2007, when they were hit by widespread foreclosures on the underlying loans. TARP was intended to improve the liquidity of these assets by purchasing them using secondary market mechanisms, thus allowing participating institutions to stabilize their balance sheets and avoid further losses.

TARP does not allow banks to recoup losses already incurred on troubled assets, but officials expect that once trading of these assets resumes, their prices will stabilize and ultimately increase in value, resulting in gains to both participating banks and the Treasury itself. The concept of future gains from troubled assets comes from the hypothesis in the financial industry that these assets are oversold, as only a small percentage of all mortgages are in default, while the relative fall in prices represents losses from a much higher default rate.

The Emergency Economic Stabilization Act of 2008 (EESA) requires financial institutions selling assets to TARP to issue equity warrants (a type of security that entitles its holder to purchase shares in the company issuing the security for a specific price), or equity or senior debt securities (for non-publicly listed companies) to the Treasury. In the case of warrants, the Treasury will only receive warrants for non-voting shares, or will agree not to vote the stock. This measure was designed to protect the government by giving the Treasury the possibility of profiting through its new ownership stakes in these institutions. Ideally, if the financial institutions benefit from government assistance and recover their former strength, the government will also be able to profit from their recovery.

Another important goal of TARP was to encourage banks to resume lending again at levels seen before the crisis, both to each other and to consumers and businesses. If TARP can stabilize bank capital ratios, it should theoretically allow them to increase lending instead of hoarding cash to cushion against future unforeseen losses from troubled assets. Increased lending equates to "loosening" of credit, which the government hopes will restore order to the financial markets and improve investor confidence in financial institutions and the markets. As banks gain increased lending confidence, the interbank lending interest rates (the rates at which the banks lend to each other on a short-term basis) should decrease, further facilitating lending.

TARP will operate as a "revolving purchase facility." The Treasury will have a set spending limit, $250 billion at the start of the program, with which it will purchase the assets and then either sell them or hold the assets and collect the coupons. The money received from sales and coupons will go back into the pool, facilitating the purchase of more assets. The initial $250 billion could be increased to $350 billion upon the president's certification to Congress that such an increase was necessary. The remaining $350 billion may be released to the Treasury upon a written report to Congress from the Treasury with details of its plan for the money. Congress then had 15 days to vote to disapprove the increase before the money will be automatically released. Privately held mortgages would be eligible for other incentives, including a favorable loan modification for five years.

The authority of the United States Department of the Treasury to establish and manage TARP under a newly created Office of Financial Stability became law October 3, 2008, the result of an initial proposal that ultimately was passed by Congress as H.R. 1424, enacting the Emergency Economic Stabilization Act of 2008 and several other acts.

On October 8, the British announced their bank rescue package consisting of funding, debt guarantees and infusing capital into banks via preferred stock. This model was closely followed by the rest of Europe, as well as the U.S Government, who on the October 14 announced a $250bn (£143bn) Capital Purchase Program to buy stakes in a wide variety of banks in an effort to restore confidence in the sector. The money came from the $700bn Troubled Asset Relief Program.

== Timeline of changes to the TARP ==
To qualify for this program, the Treasury required participating institutions to meet certain criteria, including: "(1) ensuring that incentive compensation for senior executives does not encourage unnecessary and excessive risks that threaten the value of the financial institution; (2) required clawback of any bonus or incentive compensation paid to a senior executive based on statements of earnings, gains or other criteria that are later proven to be materially inaccurate; (3) prohibition on the financial institution from making any golden parachute payment to a senior executive based on the Internal Revenue Code provision; and (4) agreement not to deduct for tax purposes executive compensation in excess of $500,000 for each senior executive". The Treasury also bought preferred stock and warrants from hundreds of smaller banks, using the first $250 billion allotted to the program.

The first allocation of the TARP money was primarily used to buy preferred stock, which was similar to debt in that it gets paid before common equity shareholders. This had led some economists to argue that the plan may be ineffective in inducing banks to lend efficiently.

In the original plan, the government would buy troubled (also known as 'toxic') assets in insolvent banks and then sell them at auction to private investor and/or companies. This plan was scratched when United Kingdom's Prime Minister Gordon Brown came to the White House for an international summit on the global credit crisis. Prime Minister Brown, in an attempt to mitigate the credit squeeze in England, planned a package of three measures consisting of funding, debt guarantees and infusing capital into banks via preferred stock. The objective was to directly support banks' solvency and funding; in some economists' view, effectively nationalizing many banks. This plan seemed attractive to the Treasury Secretary in that it was relatively easier and seemingly boosted lending more quickly. The first half of the asset purchases may not be effective in getting banks to lend again because they were reluctant to risk lending as before with low lending standards. To make matters worse, overnight lending to other banks came to a relative halt because banks did not trust each other to be prudent with their money.

On November 12, 2008, Paulson indicated that reviving the securitization market for consumer credit would be a new priority in the second allotment.

On December 19, 2008, President Bush used his executive authority to declare that TARP funds could be spent on any program that Paulson, deemed necessary to alleviate the 2008 financial crisis. On December 31, 2008, the Treasury issued a report reviewing Section 102, the Troubled Assets Insurance Financing Fund, also known as the "Asset Guarantee Program." The report indicated that the program would likely not be made "widely available."

On January 15, 2009, the Treasury issued interim final rules for reporting and record keeping requirements under the executive compensation standards of the Capital Purchase Program (CPP). Six days later, the Treasury announced new regulations regarding disclosure and mitigation of conflicts of interest in its TARP contracting.

On February 5, 2009, the Senate approved changes to the TARP that prohibited firms receiving TARP funds from paying bonuses to their 25 highest-paid employees. The measure was proposed by Christopher Dodd of Connecticut as an amendment to the $900 billion economic stimulus act then waiting to be passed. On February 10, the newly confirmed secretary of the treasury Timothy Geithner outlined his plan to use the remaining $300 billion or so in TARP funds. He intended to direct $50 billion towards foreclosure mitigation and use the rest to help fund private investors to buy toxic assets from banks. Nevertheless, this highly anticipated speech coincided with a nearly 5 percent drop in the S&P 500 and was criticized for lacking details.

Geithner announced on March 23, 2009, a Public-Private Investment Program (P-PIP) to buy toxic assets from banks' balance sheets. The major stock market indexes in the United States rallied on the day of the announcement rising by over six percent with the shares of bank stocks leading the way. P-PIP has two primary programs. The Legacy Loans Program will attempt to buy residential loans from bank's balance sheets. The Federal Deposit Insurance Corporation (FDIC) will provide non-recourse loan guarantees for up to 85 percent of the purchase price of legacy loans. Private sector asset managers and the U.S. Treasury will provide the remaining assets. The second program was called the legacy securities program, which would buy residential mortgage backed securities (RMBS) that were originally rated AAA and commercial mortgage-backed securities (CMBS) and asset-backed securities (ABS) which were rated AAA. The funds would come in many instances in equal parts from the U.S. Treasury's TARP monies, private investors, and from loans from the Federal Reserve's Term Asset-Backed Securities Loan Facility (TALF). The initial size of the Public Private Investment Partnership was projected to be $500 billion. Economist and Nobel Prize winner Paul Krugman had been very critical of this program arguing the non-recourse loans lead to a hidden subsidy that will be split by asset managers, banks' shareholders and creditors. Banking analyst Meredith Whitney argued that banks will not sell bad assets at fair market values because they are reluctant to take asset write downs. Economist Linus Wilson, a frequent commenter on TARP related issues, also pointed to excessive misinformation and erroneous analysis surrounding the U.S. toxic asset auction plan. Removing toxic assets would also reduce the volatility of banks' stock prices. This lost volatility would hurt the stock price of distressed banks. Therefore, such banks would only sell toxic assets at above market prices.

On April 19, 2009, the Obama administration outlined the conversion of the TARP loans to common stock.

== Administrative structure ==
The program was run by the Treasury's new Office of Financial Stability. According to a speech made by Neel Kashkari, the fund would be split into the following administrative units:

1. Mortgage-backed securities purchase program: This team is identifying which troubled assets to purchase, from whom to buy them and which purchase mechanism will best meet our policy objectives. Here, we are designing the detailed auction protocols and will work with vendors to implement the program.
2. Whole loan purchase program: Regional banks are particularly clogged with whole residential mortgage loans. This team is working with bank regulators to identify which types of loans to purchase first, how to value them, and which purchase mechanism will best meet our policy objectives.
3. Insurance program: We are establishing a program to insure troubled assets. We have several innovative ideas on how to structure this program, including how to insure mortgage-backed securities as well as whole loans. At the same time, we recognize that there are likely other good ideas out there that we could benefit from. Accordingly, on Friday we submitted to the Federal Register a public Request for Comment to solicit the best ideas on structuring options. We are requiring responses within fourteen days so we can consider them quickly, and begin designing the program.
4. Equity purchase program: We are designing a standardized program to purchase equity in a broad array of financial institutions. As with the other programs, the equity purchase program will be voluntary and designed with attractive terms to encourage participation from healthy institutions. It will also encourage firms to raise new private capital to complement public capital.
5. Homeownership preservation: When we purchase mortgages and mortgage-backed securities, we will look for every opportunity possible to help homeowners. This goal is consistent with other programs – such as HOPE NOW – aimed at working with borrowers, counselors and servicers to keep people in their homes. In this case, we are working with the Department of Housing and Urban Development to maximize these opportunities to help as many homeowners as possible, while also protecting the government.
6. Executive compensation: The law sets out important requirements regarding executive compensation for firms that participate in the TARP. This team is working hard to define the requirements for financial institutions to participate in three possible scenarios: One, an auction purchase of troubled assets; two, a broad equity or direct purchase program; and three, a case of an intervention to prevent the impending failure of a systemically significant institution.
7. Compliance: The law establishes important oversight and compliance structures, including establishing an Oversight Board, on-site participation of the General Accounting Office and the creation of a Special Inspector General, with thorough reporting requirements.

Eric Thorson was the inspector general of the US Department of the Treasury and was responsible for the oversight of the TARP but expressed concerns about the difficulty of properly overseeing the complex program in addition to his regular responsibilities. Thorson called oversight of TARP a "mess" and later clarified this to say "The word 'mess' was a description of the difficulty my office would have in providing the proper level of oversight of the TARP while handling its growing workload, including conducting audits of certain failed banks and thrifts at the same time that efforts are underway to nominate a special inspector general." Neil Barofsky, an assistant United States attorney for the Southern District of New York, was nominated to be the first Special Inspector General for the Troubled Asset Relief Program (SIGTARP). He was confirmed by the Senate on December 8, 2008, and was sworn into office on December 15, 2008. He stepped down from the post on March 30, 2011.

The Treasury retained the law firms of Squire, Sanders & Dempsey and Hughes, Hubbard & Reed to assist in the administration of the program. Accounting and internal controls support services have been contracted from PricewaterhouseCoopers and Ernst and Young under the Federal Supply Schedule.

== Participation criteria ==
The act's criterion for participation stated that "financial institutions" will be included in TARP if they are "established and regulated" under the laws of the United States and if they have "significant operations" in the United States. The Treasury would need to define what institutions will be included under the term "financial institution" and what will constitute "significant operations". Companies that sell their bad assets to the government must have provided warrants so that the government would benefit from future growth of the companies. Certain institutions seemed to be guaranteed participation. These included: U.S. banks, U.S. branches of a foreign bank, U.S. savings banks or credit unions, U.S. broker-dealers, U.S. insurance companies, U.S. mutual funds or other U.S. registered investment companies, tax-qualified U.S. employee retirement plans, and bank holding companies.

The president was to submit a law to cover government losses on the fund, using "a small, broad-based fee on all financial institutions". To participate in the bailout program, "...companies will lose certain tax benefits and, in some cases, must limit executive pay. In addition, the bill limits 'golden parachutes' and requires that unearned bonuses be returned." The fund had an Oversight Board so that the U.S. Treasury cannot act in an arbitrary manner. There was also an inspector general to protect against waste, fraud and abuse.

CAMELS ratings (US supervisory ratings used to classify the nation's 8,500 banks) were being used by the United States government in response to the 2008 financial crisis to help it decide which banks to provide special help for and which to not as part of its capitalization program authorized by the Emergency Economic Stabilization Act of 2008. It was being used to classify the nation's 8,500 banks into five categories, where a ranking of 1 means they are most likely to be helped and a 5 most likely to not be helped. Regulators were applying a short list of criteria based on a secret ratings system they use to gauge this.

The New York Times stated: "The criteria being used to choose who gets money appears to be setting the stage for consolidation in the industry by favoring those most likely to survive" because the criteria appear to favor the financially best off banks and banks too big to let fail. Some lawmakers are upset that the capitalization program will end up culling banks in their districts. However, The Wall Street Journal suggested that some lawmakers are actively using TARP to funnel money to weak regional banks in their districts. Academic studies have found that banks and credit unions located in the districts of key Congress members had been more likely to win TARP money.

Known aspects of the capitalization program "suggest that the government may be loosely defining what constitutes healthy institutions. [... Banks] that have been profitable over the last year are the most likely to receive capital. Banks that have lost money over the last year, however, must pass additional tests. [...] They are also asking if a bank has enough capital and reserves to withstand severe losses to its construction loan portfolio, nonperforming loans and other troubled assets." Some banks received capital with the understanding the banks would try to find a merger partner. To receive capital under the program banks are also "required to provide a specific business plan for the next two or three years and explain how they plan to deploy the capital".

== Eligible assets and asset valuation ==
TARP allowed the Treasury to purchase both "troubled assets" and any other asset the purchase of which the Treasury determined was "necessary" to further economic stability. Troubled assets included real estate and mortgage-related assets and securities based on those assets. This included both the mortgages themselves and the various financial instruments created by pooling groups of mortgages into one security to be bought on the market. This category probably included foreclosed properties as well.

Real estate and mortgage-related assets (and securities based on those kinds of assets) were eligible if they originated (that is, were created) or were issued on or before March 14, 2008, the date of the Bear Stearns bailout.

One of the more difficult issues that the Treasury faced in managing TARP was the pricing of the troubled assets. The Treasury had to find a way to price extremely complex and sometimes unwieldy instruments for which a market did not exist. In addition, the pricing had to strike a balance between efficiently using public funds provided by the government and providing adequate assistance to the financial institutions that need it.

The Act encouraged the Treasury to design a program using market mechanisms to the extent possible. This had led to the expectation that the Treasury would use a reverse auction to price assets. Theoretically, the system would create a market price from bidders that would want to sell at the highest possible price, but also be able to make a sale, therefore the price must set a low enough price to be competitive. The Treasury was required to publish its methods for pricing, purchasing, and valuing troubled assets no later than two days after the purchase of their first asset. The Congressional Budget Office (CBO) used procedures similar to those specified in the Federal Credit Reform Act (FCRA) to value assets purchased under the TARP.

In a report dated February 6, 2009, the Congressional Oversight Panel concluded that the Treasury paid substantially more for the assets it purchased under the TARP than their then-current market value. The COP found the Treasury paid $254 billion, for which it received assets worth approximately $176 billion, for a shortfall of $78 billion. The COP's valuation analysis assumed that "securities similar to those issued under the TARP were trading in the capital markets at fair values" and employed multiple approaches to cross-check and validate the results. The value was estimated for each security as of the time immediately following the announcement by Treasury of its purchase. For example, the COP found that the Treasury bought $25 billion of assets from Citigroup on October 14, 2008, however, the actual value was estimated to be $15.5, creating a 38 percent (or $9.5 billion) subsidy.

== Protection of government investment ==
1. Equity stakes
  1. The Act requires financial institutions selling assets to TARP to issue equity warrants (a type of security that entitles its holder to purchase shares in the company issuing the security for a specific price), or equity or senior debt securities (for non-publicly listed companies) to the Treasury. In the case of warrants, the Treasury will only receive warrants for non-voting shares, or will agree not to vote the stock. This measure is designed to protect the government by giving the Treasury the possibility of profiting through its new ownership stakes in these institutions. Ideally, if the financial institutions benefit from government assistance and recover their former strength, the government will also be able to profit from their recovery.
2. Limits on executive compensation
  1. The Act sets some limits on the compensation of the five highest-paid executives at companies that elect to participate significantly in TARP. The Act treats companies that participate through the auction process differently from those that participate through direct sale (that is, without a bidding process).
    1. Companies who sell more than $300 million in assets through an auction process are prohibited from signing new "golden parachute" contracts (employment contracts that provide for large payments upon termination) with any future executives. It will also place a $500,000 limit on annual tax deductions for payment of each executive, as well as a deduction limit on severance benefits for any golden parachutes already in place.
    2. Companies in which the Treasury acquires equity because of direct purchases must meet tougher standards to be established by the Treasury. These standards will require the companies to eliminate compensation structures that encourage "unnecessary and excessive" risk-taking by executives, provide for claw-back (forced repayment of bonuses in the event of a post-payment determination that the bonuses were paid on the basis of false data) of bonuses already paid to senior executives based on financial statements later proven to be inaccurate, and prohibit payment of previously established golden parachutes.
3. Recoupment
  1. This provision was a big factor in the eventual passage of the EESA. It gives the government the opportunity to "be repaid". The recoupment provision requires the Director of the Office of Management and Budget to submit a report on TARP's financial status to Congress five years after its enactment. If TARP has not been able to recoup its outlays through the sale of the assets, the Act requires the President to submit a plan to Congress to recoup the losses from the financial industry. Theoretically, this prevents TARP from adding to the national debt. The use of the term "financial industry" in the provision leaves open the possibility that such a plan would involve the entire financial sector rather than only those institutions that availed themselves of TARP.
4. Disclosure and Transparency
  1. Though the Treasury will ultimately determine the type and extent of disclosure required for participation in the TARP, it is clear that these requirements will be extensive, particularly with respect to any asset acquired by TARP. It seems certain that institutions who participate in TARP will have to publicly disclose information pertaining to their participation, including the number of assets they sold to TARP, what type of assets were sold, and at what price. More extensive disclosure may be required at the discretion of the Treasury.
  2. The Act also seems to give a broad mandate to the Treasury to determine, for each "type" of institution that sells assets to TARP, whether the current disclosure and transparency requirements on the sources of the institution's exposure (such as off-balance sheet transactions, derivative instruments, and contingent liabilities) are adequate. If the Treasury finds that a particular institution has not provided sufficient disclosures, it has the power to make recommendations for new disclosure requirements to the institution's regulators, which will probably include foreign-government regulators for those foreign financial institutions that have "significant operations" in the United States.
5. Judicial Review of Treasury Actions
  1. The Act provides for judicial review of the actions taken by the Treasury under the EESA. In other words, the Treasury may be taken to court for actions it takes pursuant to the Act. Specifically, Treasury actions may be held unlawful if they involve an abuse of discretion, or are found to be "arbitrary, capricious . . . or not in accordance with law". However, a financial institution that sells assets to TARP is cannot challenge the Treasury's actions with respect to that institution's specific participation in TARP.

== Expenditures and commitments ==
As of June 30, 2012, $467 billion had been allotted, and $416 billion spent, according to a literature review on the TARP. The money committed includes:

- $204.9 billion to purchase bank equity shares through the Capital Purchase Program
- $67.8 billion to purchase preferred shares of American International Group (AIG), then among the top 10 US companies, through the program for Systemically Significant Failing Institutions;
- $1.4 billion to back any losses that the Federal Reserve Bank of New York might incur under the Term Asset-Backed Securities Loan Facility;
- $40 billion in stock purchases of Citigroup and Bank of America ($20 billion each) through the Targeted Investment Program ($40 billion spent). All that money had been returned.
- $5 billion in loan guarantees for Citigroup ($5 billion). The program closed, with no payment made, on December 23, 2009.
- $79.7 billion in loans and capital injections to automakers and their financing arms through the Automotive Industry Financing Program.
- $21.9 billion to buy "toxic" mortgage-related securities.
- $0.57 billion in capital for banks in Community Development Capital Initiative (CDCI) for banks serving disadvantaged communities. Eligible institutions had to be designated community development financial institutions (CDFI's). CDFI's attempt to make 60 percent of their loans to underserved communities. In exchange, they are eligible for special federal capital assistance.
- $45.6 billion for homeowner foreclosure assistance. Only $4.5 billion had been spent at the time.

The Congressional Budget Office released a report in January 2009, reviewing the transactions enacted through the TARP. The CBO found that through December 31, 2008, transactions under the TARP totaled $247 billion. According to the CBO's report, the Treasury had purchased $178 billion in shares of preferred stock and warrants from 214 U.S. financial institutions through its Capital Purchase Program (CPP). This included the purchase of $40 billion of preferred stock in AIG, $25 billion of preferred stock in Citigroup, and $15 billion of preferred stock in Bank of America. The Treasury also agreed to lend $18.4 billion to General Motors and Chrysler. The Treasury, the FDIC and the Federal Reserve have also agreed to guarantee a $306 billion portfolio of assets owned by Citigroup.

The CBO also estimated the subsidy cost for transactions under TARP. The subsidy cost is defined as, broadly speaking, the difference between what the Treasury paid for the investments or lent to the firms and the market value of those transactions, where the assets in question were valued using procedures similar to those specified in the Federal Credit Reform Act (FCRA), but adjusting for market risk as specified in the EESA. The CBO estimated that the subsidy cost of the $247 billion in transactions before December 31, 2008, amounts to $64 billion. As of August 31, 2015, TARP is projected to cost approximately $37.3 billion total—significantly less than the $700 billion originally authorized by Congress.

In the April 2024 final report, the Congressional Budget Office stated that net disbursements of TARP funds for all mortgage programs were $31.4 billion. Because most of those funds were in the form of direct grants that do not require repayment, CBO estimated that the government's cost was close to the full amount disbursed (which is to say that the program had almost a 100 percent subsidy rate).

The May 2015 report of the TARP to Congress stated that $427.1 billion had been disbursed, total proceeds by April 30, 2015, were $441.8 billion, exceeding disbursements by $14.1 billion, though this included $17.7 billion in non-TARP AIG shares. The report predicted a total net cash outflow of $37.7 billion (excluding non-TARP AIG shares), based on the assumption the TARP housing programs' (Hardest Hit Fund, Making Home Affordable and FHA refinancing) funds are fully taken up. Debt is still outstanding, some of which has been converted to common stock, from just under $125 million down to $7,000. Sums loaned to entities that have gone into, and in some cases emerged from bankruptcy or receivership are provided. Additional sums have been written off, for example Treasury's original investment of $854 million in Old GM.

The May 2015 report also detailed other costs of the program, including $1.157 billion "for financial agents and legal firms" $142 million for personnel services, and $303 million for "other services".

== Participants ==
The banks agreeing to receive preferred stock investments from the Treasury include Goldman Sachs, Morgan Stanley, JPMorgan Chase, Bank of America (which had just agreed to purchase Merrill Lynch), Citigroup, Wells Fargo, Bank of New York Mellon and State Street Corporation The Bank of New York Mellon is to serve as master custodian overseeing the fund.

The U.S. Treasury maintains an official list of TARP recipients and proceeds to the government on a TARP website. Note that foreign-owned U.S. banks were not eligible. Beneficiaries of TARP include the following:

Company	Preferred stock purchased (billions USD)	Assets guaranteed (billions USD)	Repaid TARP money (billions USD)	Additional details
Citigroup	$45	$306	$20	Two allocations: $25 on October 28, 2008 and $20 in January 2009. The rest was converted to common equity which was sold by the Treasury Department over time with the final sale taking place in December 2010 at a $12 billion profit. Citi received the largest amount of TARP funding, "a larger bailout than any other U.S. bank."
Bank of America	$45	$118	Yes	Two allocations: $25 on October 28, 2008, and $20 in January 2009
AIG (American International Group)	$40		$36	
JPMorgan Chase	$25		Yes	October 28, 2008
Wells Fargo	$25		Yes	October 28, 2008
GMAC Financial Services (Ally)	$17.3		Yes	Total stake has been liquidated with income received of $19.6 billion. Now renamed to Ally Financial.
General Motors	$13.4		Yes	Total loan portion repaid with interest to U.S. & Canadian governments as of April 21, 2010; $2.1 billion in preferred stock and 61 percent common equity share outstanding
Goldman Sachs	$10		Yes	October 28, 2008
Morgan Stanley	$10		Yes	Repaid June 17, 2009
PNC Financial Services Group	$7.579		Yes	Bought longtime rival National City Corp. within hours of receiving TARP money. Announced on February 2, 2010, that it would repay its TARP loan.
U.S. Bancorp	$6.6		Yes	
Chrysler	$4		Yes	Although Chrysler repaid their loans, the Treasury sold its 6% stake in the company to Fiat at a $1.3 billion loss.
Capital One Financial	$3.555		Yes	
Regions Financial Corporation	$3.5		Yes	Repaid April 4, 2012
American Express	$3.389		Yes	
Bank of New York Mellon Corp	$2 to $3		Yes	
State Street Corporation	$2 to $3		Yes	
Discover Financial	$1.23		Yes	

Of these banks, JPMorgan Chase & Co., Morgan Stanley, American Express Co., Goldman Sachs Group Inc., U.S. Bancorp, Capital One Financial Corp., Bank of New York Mellon Corp., State Street Corp., BB&T Corp, Wells Fargo & Co. and Bank of America repaid TARP money. Most banks repaid TARP funds using capital raised from the issuance of equity securities and debt not guaranteed by the federal government. PNC Financial Services, one of the few profitable banks without TARP money, planned on paying their share back by January 2011, by building up its cash reserves instead of issuing equity securities. However, PNC reversed course on February 2, 2010, by issuing $3 billion in shares and $1.5-2 billion in senior notes in order to pay its TARP funds back. PNC also raised funds by selling its Global Investment Services division to crosstown rival The Bank of New York Mellon.

In a January 2012 review, it was reported that AIG still owed around $50 billion, GM about $25 billion and Ally about $12 billion. Break even on the first two companies would be at $28.73 a share versus then-current share price of $25.31 and $53.98 versus then-current share price of $24.92, respectively. Ally was not publicly traded. The 371 banks that still owed money include Regions ($3.5 billion), Zions Bancorporation ($1.4 billion), Synovus Financial Corp. ($967.9 million), Popular, Inc. ($935 million), First BanCorp of San Juan, Puerto Rico ($400 million) and M&T Bank Corp. ($381.5 million).

=== Non-participants ===
Many banks, particularly regional banks, refused to participate in TARP. They cited various reasons, including high-quality assets, high capitalization, high loan-to-value ratios, and sufficient funding. These banks included many listed on the NYSE, including Frost Bank, BancorpSouth, First Commonwealth Financial Corporation, and Prosperity Bancshares.

== TARP fraud ==
Some in the financial industry have been accused of not using the loaned dollars for its intended reason. Others further abused investors after the TARP legislation was passed by telling investors their money was invested in the federal TARP financial bailout program and other securities that did not exist. Neil Barofsky, Special Inspector General for the Troubled Asset Relief Program (SIGTARP), told lawmakers, "Inadequate oversight and insufficient information about what companies are doing with the money leaves the program open to fraud, including conflicts of interest facing fund managers, collusion between participants and vulnerabilities to money laundering.

In its October 2011 quarterly report to Congress, SIGTARP reported "more than 150 ongoing criminal and civil investigations". SIGTARP had already achieved criminal convictions of 28 defendants (19 had already been sentenced to prison), and civil cases naming 37 individuals and 18 corporate/legal entities as defendants. It had recovered $151 million, and prevented $553 million going to Colonial Bank, which failed.

The first TARP fraud case was brought by the SEC on January 19, 2009, against Nashville-based Gordon Grigg and his firm ProTrust Management. The latest occurred in March 2010, with the FBI claiming Charles Antonucci, the former president and chief executive of the Park Avenue Bank, made false statements to regulators in an effort to obtain about $11 million from the fund.

== Special Inspector General for the Troubled Asset Relief Program ==
The special inspector ceneral for the Troubled Asset Relief Program (SIGTARP) was established by Congress in 2008 to oversee the implementation of the Troubled Asset Relief Program (TARP), which was created to stabilize the U.S. economy during the financial crisis. TARP involved the U.S. government providing financial assistance to banks, automakers, and other institutions at risk of failure. SIGTARP's primary role is to ensure that TARP funds are used properly and to investigate potential fraud, waste, and abuse. It works independently from the U.S. Department of Treasury, which administers TARP, and is tasked with maintaining transparency and accountability in the program's operations.

SIGTARP conducts audits, investigations, and legal actions to detect and deter misconduct related to TARP funds. It reports its findings regularly to Congress, the president, and the public, providing oversight on the effectiveness and integrity of the program. Through its efforts, SIGTARP helps protect taxpayers by holding individuals and organizations accountable for improper use of government funds. Additionally, it plays a key role in ensuring that TARP's goals of stabilizing the financial system and stimulating economic recovery are achieved without compromising public trust.

== Similar historical federal banking programs ==
The nearest parallel action the federal government has taken was in investments made by the Reconstruction Finance Corporation (RFC) in the 1930s. The RFC, an agency chartered during the Herbert Hoover administration in 1932, made loans to distressed banks and bought stock in 6,000 banks, totaling $1.3 billion. The New York Times, citing finance experts on October 13, 2008, noted that, "A similar effort these days, in proportion to today's economy, would be about $200 billion." When the economy had stabilized, the government sold its bank stock to private investors or the banks, and is estimated to have received approximately the same amount previously invested.

In 1984, the government took an 80 percent stake in the nation's then seventh-largest bank Continental Illinois Bank and Trust. Continental Illinois made loans to oil drillers and service companies in Oklahoma and Texas. The government was estimated to have lost $1 billion because of Continental Illinois, which ultimately became part of Bank of America.

The $24 billion for the estimated subsidy cost of TARP was less than the government's cost for the savings and loan crisis of the late 1980s, although the subsidy cost does not include the cost of other "bailout" programs (such as the Federal Reserve's Maiden Lane Transactions and the federal takeover of Fannie Mae and Freddie Mac). The cost of the S&L crisis amounted to 3.2 percent of GDP during the Reagan/Bush era, while the GDP percentage of the TARP cost was estimated at less than 1 percent.

== Controversies ==
The primary purpose of TARP, according to the Federal Reserve, was to stabilize the financial sector by purchasing illiquid assets from banks and other financial institutions. However, the effects of the TARP have been widely debated in large part because the purpose of the fund is not widely understood. A review of investor presentations and conference calls by executives of some two dozen US-based banks by The New York Times found that "few [banks] cited lending as a priority. Further, an overwhelming majority saw the program as a no-strings-attached windfall that could be used to pay down debt, acquire other businesses or invest for the future." The article cited several bank chairmen as stating that they viewed the money as available for strategic acquisitions in the future rather than to increase lending to the private sector, whose ability to pay back the loans was suspect. PlainsCapital chairman Alan B. White saw the Bush administration's cash infusion as "opportunity capital", noting, "They didn't tell me I had to do anything particular with it."

Moreover, while TARP funds have been provided to bank holding companies, those holding companies have only used a fraction of such funds to recapitalize their bank subsidiaries.

Many analysts speculated TARP funds could be used by stronger banks to buy weaker ones. On October 24, 2008, PNC Financial Services received $7.7 billion in TARP funds, then only hours later agreed to buy National City Corp. for $5.58 billion, an amount that was considered a bargain. Despite ongoing speculation that more TARP funds could be used by large-but-weak banks to gobble up small banks, as of October 2009, no further such takeover had occurred.

The Senate Congressional Oversight Panel created to oversee the TARP concluded on January 9, 2009: "In particular, the Panel sees no evidence that the U.S. Treasury has used TARP funds to support the housing market by avoiding preventable foreclosures." The panel also concluded that "Although half the money has not yet been received by the banks, hundreds of billions of dollars have been injected into the marketplace with no demonstrable effects on lending."

Government officials that oversaw the bailout acknowledged the difficulties in tracking the money and in measuring the bailout's effectiveness.

During 2008, companies that received $295 billion in bailout money had spent $114 million on lobbying and campaign contributions. Banks that received bailout money had compensated their top executives nearly $1.6 billion in 2007, including salaries, cash bonuses, stock options, and benefits including personal use of company jets and chauffeurs, home security, country club memberships, and professional money management. The Obama administration has promised to set a $500,000 cap on executive pay at companies that receive bailout money, directing banks to tie risk taken to workers' reward by paying anything further in deferred stock. Graef Crystal, a former compensation consultant and author of "The Crystal Report on Executive Compensation", claimed that the limits on executive pay were "a joke" and that "they're just allowing companies to defer compensation."

In November 2011, a report showed that the sum of the government's guarantees increased to $7.77 trillion; however, loans to banks were only a small fraction of that amount.

== American Bankers Association's attempts to expunge the TARP warrants ==
By March 31, 2009, four banks out of over five hundred had returned their preferred stock obligations. None of the publicly traded banks had yet bought back their warrants owned by the U.S. Treasury by March 31, 2009. According to the terms of the U.S. Treasury's investment, the banks returning funds can either negotiate to buy back the warrants at fair market value, or the U.S. Treasury can sell the warrants to third party investors as soon as feasible. Warrants are call options that add to the number of shares of stock outstanding if they are exercised for a profit. The American Bankers Association (ABA) has lobbied Congress to cancel the warrants owned by the government, calling them an "onerous exit fee". Yet, if the Capital Purchase Program warrants of Goldman Sachs are representative, then the Capital Purchase Program warrants were worth between $5 billion and $24 billion as of May 1, 2009. Canceling the CPP warrants thus amounts to a $5 billion to $24 billion subsidy to the banking industry at government expense. While the ABA wants the CPP warrants to be written off by the government, Goldman Sachs does not hold that view. A representative of Goldman Sachs was quoted as saying "We think that taxpayers should expect a decent return on their investment and look forward to being able to provide just that when we are permitted to return the TARP money."

== Impact ==
In total, U.S. government economic bailouts related to the 2008 financial crisis had federal outflows (expenditures, loans, and investments) of $633.6 billion and inflows (funds returned to the Treasury as interest, dividends, fees, or stock warrant repurchases) of $754.8 billion, for a net profit of $121 billion. Of financial system bailout outflows, 38.7% went to banks and other financial institutions, 30.2% to Fannie Mae and Freddie Mac, 12.6% to auto companies, and 10.7% to AIG, with the remaining 7.8% in other programs.

A 2019 study by economist Deborah Lucas published in the Annual Review of Financial Economics estimated "that the total direct cost of the 2008 crisis-related bailouts in the United States" (including TARP and other programs) was about $500 billion, or 3.5% of the United States's GDP in 2009, and that "the largest direct beneficiaries of the bailouts were the unsecured creditors of financial institutions." Lucas noted that this cost estimate "stands in sharp contrast to popular accounts that claim there was no cost because the money was repaid, and with claims of costs in the trillions of dollars."

In a 2012 survey of leading economists conducted by the University of Chicago Booth School of Business' Initiative on Global Markets, economists generally agreed that unemployment at the end of 2010 would have been higher without the program.

== See also ==
- 2008 financial crisis
- 2008 United Kingdom bank rescue package
- American Recovery and Reinvestment Act of 2009
- Corporate welfare
- Emergency Economic Stabilization Act of 2008
- Financial Crisis Responsibility Fee
- Lemon socialism
- Matthew Pendo
- NCUA Corporate Stabilization Program
