= United States Assistant Secretary of the Treasury =

United States federal position

The flag of an Assistant Secretary of the Treasury

Assistant Secretary of the Treasury is one of several positions in the United States Department of the Treasury, serving under the secretary of the Treasury.

== History ==
According to the U.S. statute, there are eight assistant secretaries of the Treasury appointed by the president of the United States with the advice and consent of the United States Senate. Two assistant secretaries (public affairs and management), appointed by the president, do not require confirmation by the Senate. Additionally there are two deputy under secretaries of the treasury (legislative affairs, and international finance and development) that may also be and typically are designated assistant secretaries by the president. The Emergency Economic Stabilization Act of 2008 specified that one assistant secretary take on a specific role, the assistant secretary of the Treasury for financial stability. This role was abolished in June 2014 with the resignation of Timothy Massad. The fiscal assistant secretary is appointed by the U.S. Treasury secretary.

== Current assistant secretaries ==
The assistant secretary positions are:

- Reporting directly to the secretary of the treasury and deputy secretary of the treasury:
  - Assistant Secretary of the Treasury for Economic Policy
  - Assistant Secretary/Deputy Under Secretary of the Treasury for Legislative Affairs
  - Assistant Secretary of the Treasury for Management & Chief Financial Officer
  - Assistant Secretary of the Treasury for Public Affairs
  - Assistant Secretary of the Treasury for Tax Policy
- Reports to the under secretary of the treasury for domestic finance:
  - Assistant Secretary of the Treasury for Financial Institutions
  - Assistant Secretary of the Treasury for Financial Markets
  - Fiscal Assistant Secretary of the Treasury
- Reports to the under secretary of the treasury for international affairs:
  - Assistant Secretary/Deputy Under Secretary of the Treasury for International Finance and Development
  - Assistant Secretary of the Treasury for International Markets
  - Assistant Secretary of the Treasury for Investment Security
- Reports to the under secretary of the treasury for terrorism and financial intelligence
  - Assistant Secretary of the Treasury for Intelligence and Analysis
  - Assistant Secretary of the Treasury for Terrorist Financing

== Defunct offices including the designation of Assistant Secretary of the Treasury ==
- Assistant Secretary of the Treasury for Financial Stability
