= Neel Kashkari =

President/CEO Federal Reserve Bank of Minneapolis

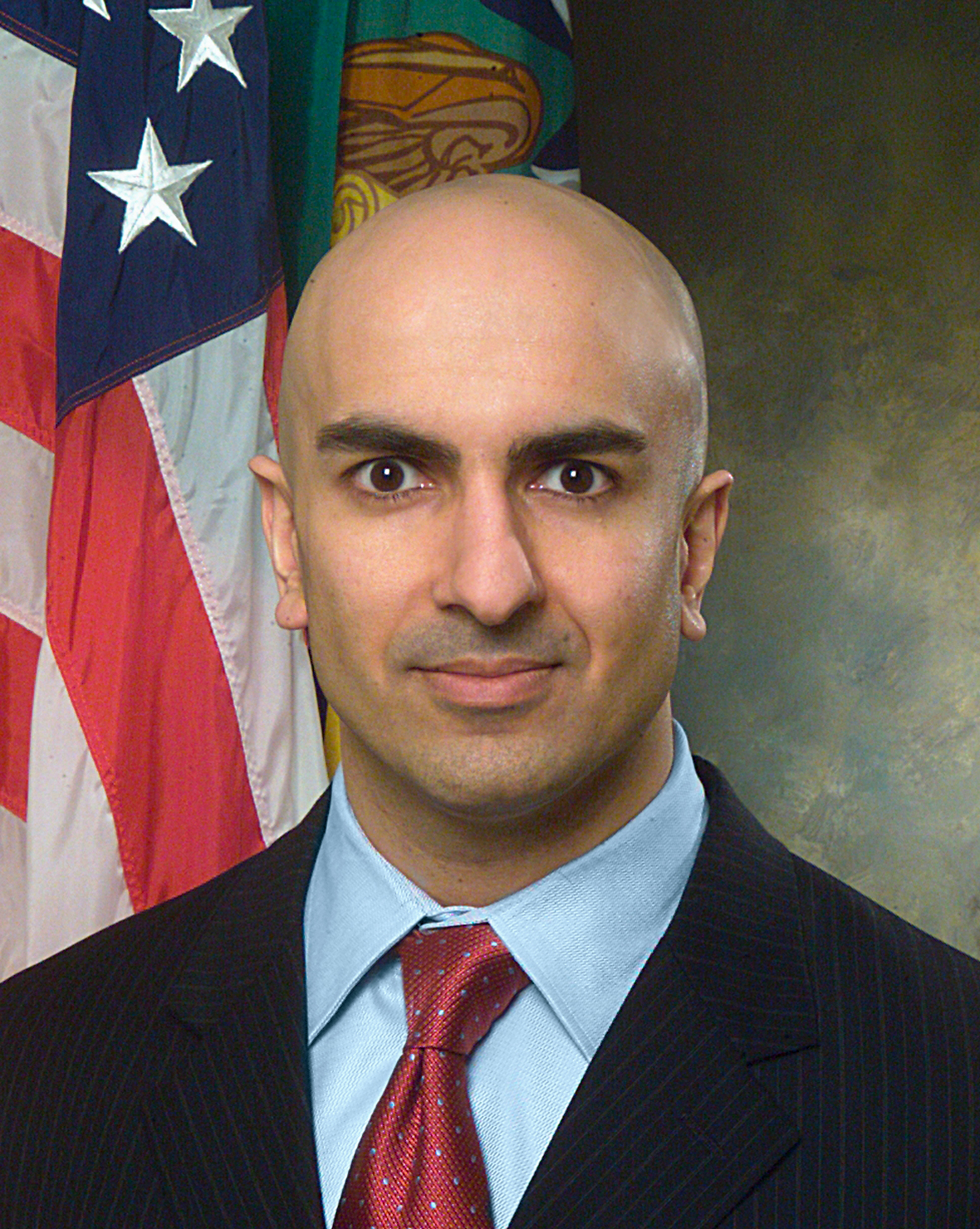
- Official portrait, 2006

13th President of the Federal Reserve Bank of Minneapolis
- Incumbent
- Assumed office January 1, 2016
- Preceded by: Narayana Kocherlakota

Assistant Secretary of the Treasury for Financial Stability
- Acting; October 6, 2008 – May 1, 2009
- President: George W. Bush; Barack Obama
- Preceded by: Position established
- Succeeded by: Herbert Allison

Assistant Secretary of the Treasury for International Affairs
- In office July 2008 – May 1, 2009
- President: George W. Bush; Barack Obama
- Preceded by: Position established
- Succeeded by: Marisa Lago

Personal details
- Born: Neel Tushar Kashkari; July 30, 1973 (age 53) Akron, Ohio, U.S.
- Party: Republican
- Spouses: Minal Jeshanker (divorced); Christine Ong (m. 2015)
- Children: 2
- Education: Western Reserve Academy
- Alma mater: University of Illinois, Urbana-Champaign (BS, MS); University of Pennsylvania (MBA)

Neel Tushar Kashkari (born July 30, 1973) is an American banker, economist, and politician who is the president of the Federal Reserve Bank of Minneapolis. As interim Assistant Secretary of the Treasury for Financial Stability from October 2008 to May 2009, he oversaw the Troubled Asset Relief Program (TARP) that was a major component of the U.S. government's response to the 2008 financial crisis. A Republican, he unsuccessfully ran for governor of California in the 2014 election.

Born and raised in Ohio, and educated at the University of Illinois at Urbana–Champaign, Kashkari worked initially as an aerospace engineer. After attending business school at the Wharton School of the University of Pennsylvania, he became an investment banker, covering the information technology security sector for Goldman Sachs.

Henry Paulson, the former head of Goldman, and then Secretary of the Treasury, hired Kashkari as an aide. Kashkari was eventually named Assistant Secretary of the Treasury for International Economics and Development. At Treasury, he played a number of roles in the response to the 2008 financial crisis and the subprime mortgage crisis that preceded it, most notably administering the TARP.

Kashkari left government and began working for Pimco in 2009, leading that company's push into the equities market. He resigned from Pimco in January 2013 to explore a run for public office. One year later, he announced his candidacy for Governor of California. He came in second in California's nonpartisan blanket primary but lost the general election to incumbent governor Jerry Brown.

He was named president of the Minneapolis Federal Reserve November 10, 2015, succeeding Narayana Kocherlakota who announced his resignation in June.

== Early life and education ==
Engineering Hall at the University of Illinois at Urbana–Champaign. Kashkari earned two degrees in mechanical engineering from UIUC.

Neel Tushar Kashkari was born on July 30, 1973, in Akron, Ohio, to Indian parents. Kashkari's mother Sheila Kashkari, was a pathologist at Akron City Hospital, and father Chaman Kashkari, worked as a professor of electrical engineering at the University of Akron.

Kashkari's parents are Kashmiri Pandits, who were both born and raised in Srinagar in the Kashmir Valley, within the Indian state of Jammu and Kashmir and immigrated to the United States in 1964. They settled in Stow, a suburb of Akron, where Neel Kashkari grew up. His parents were well known within the local community of Hindu Americans. His older sister, Meera Kashkari Kelley, is a physician specializing in infectious diseases. Growing up, Neel's parents and sister were liberal, but his free-market views led him to identify more with the Republican Party.

Kashkari attended the local Stow–Munroe Falls High School before transferring to the Western Reserve Academy in Hudson. He graduated in 1991 with honors in mathematics and was elected graduation speaker. In 2009, he described his high school grades as not good enough to apply to top-tier universities.

Kashkari earned bachelor's (1995) and master's (1998) degrees in mechanical engineering from the University of Illinois in Urbana–Champaign. He was the team leader for the mechanical engineering component of the school's entry in the 1997 Sunrayce, a solar-powered vehicle race.

== Career ==
=== Private sector ===
After completing his master's degree, Kashkari moved to Redondo Beach, in the South Bay region of Los Angeles County, California, and worked as an engineer for TRW Inc., a contractor for NASA. There he worked on a stabilizing component for the James Webb Space Telescope.

Kashkari left TRW to enter the Wharton School of the University of Pennsylvania in Philadelphia, earning an MBA in 2002. At Wharton he was president of the Finance Club and was part of the student organizing team for the annual Wharton Finance Conference.

Kashkari interned at the investment bank Goldman Sachs during the summer between his two academic years at Wharton. After graduation from Wharton in 2002, he joined Goldman's San Francisco office as an associate covering software companies in the investment banking division. In this role, he was part of the team that advised clients on mergers and acquisitions, as well as other financial matters, until leaving the firm in 2006.

He was a regional finalist for the White House Fellows program.

=== Treasury Department ===
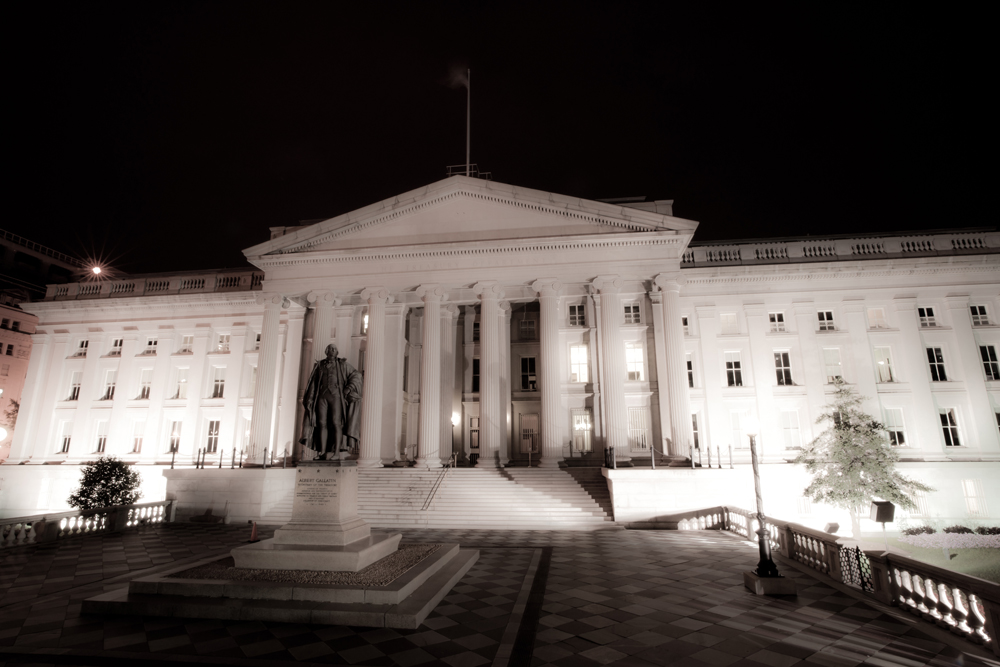
Kashkari left the private sector to work at the U.S. Department of the Treasury.

In May 2006 President George W. Bush announced his intention to appoint Henry Paulson as Secretary of the Treasury. Kashkari contacted Paulson and asked to join him at Treasury. Despite not knowing Kashkari well, Paulson agreed to meet with him, and much later offered him a job as a policy generalist. Kashkari accepted, and then Paulson remembered to confirm that Kashkari was a Republican. After the U.S. Senate confirmed Paulson, he and Kashkari started at Treasury on the same day. Kashkari was one of several Goldman employees who followed Paulson to Treasury.

Kashkari began as a special assistant to Paulson working on energy policy. He and Allan B. Hubbard developed Bush's "Twenty in Ten" plan to promote energy conservation. He also worked on issues related to India, particularly infrastructure development. In November 2007, Bush nominated Kashkari to be Assistant Secretary of the Treasury for International Economics and Development. The U.S. Senate confirmed the nomination in June 2008, and Kashkari was sworn in the following month.

==== 2008 financial crisis ====
By the summer of 2007, concerns over the credit quality of private-label securitizations, underwriting standards and institutional solvency accelerated. The value of mortgage-backed securities backed by U.S. subprime mortgages declined sharply as it became clear that many of the borrowers would continue to default on the mortgages. This caused a housing glut and the subprime mortgage crisis as the banks holding the mortgages rushed to foreclose the loans. This ultimately intensified into the 2008 financial crisis with broad implications.

Kashkari played important roles in several episodes of the crisis. He led Treasury's participation in the Hope Now Alliance, a mortgage industry initiative coordinated by the federal government that aimed to reduce foreclosures by modifying loan terms on a loan-by-loan basis. In March 2008 he represented Treasury at negotiations that led ultimately to the federally sponsored takeover and rescue of the investment bank Bear Stearns by JPMorgan Chase. He was in charge of Treasury's (ultimately unsuccessful) efforts to create a market in the U.S. for covered bonds, whose value would continue to be guaranteed by the issuing bank after the bank had sold them. He also worked closely with Paulson on Treasury's takeover of the government-sponsored enterprises Fannie Mae and Freddie Mac on September 6, 2008, and the federal bailout of American International Group on September 16.

==== TARP ====
In early 2008, Paulson directed Kashkari and fellow Treasury aide Phillip Swagel to write a plan to recapitalize the banking system in case the crisis worsened. The plan called for Congress to authorize Treasury to spend $500 billion to buy mortgage-backed securities from troubled banks, replacing them on banks' balance sheets with safe, liquid Treasury bills. This would prevent runs on the banks and encourage them to lend. The plan was conceived as an alternative to proposals from the staff of the House Financial Services Committee, then led by Democratic Representative Barney Frank.

Following the collapse of the investment bank Lehman Brothers on September 15, 2008, the Emergency Economic Stabilization Act of 2008 (EESA) was enacted on October 3. Both Democrats and Republicans in Congress voted for the law. Kashkari was one of several Paulson aides who was heavily involved in the crafting the legislation. Based in large part on Kashkari and Swagel's recapitalization plan, the EESA created the Troubled Asset Relief Program (TARP), a $700 billion bailout fund for financial institutions threatened with collapse. Kashkari initially proposed a $1 trillion fund, but Paulson vetoed that number as too large. Kashkari came up with the lesser figure of $700 billion by taking 5% of the $14 trillion in then-outstanding mortgages in the United States.

To administer TARP, the EESA created within the Treasury Department a new Office of Financial Stability to be headed by an Assistant Secretary of the Treasury for Financial Stability, who would be nominated by the president and confirmed by the Senate. However, it also specified that the Treasury Secretary could designate an interim Assistant Secretary to run the office. Kashkari first came to widespread public attention on October 6, 2008, when Paulson named him to this position. During his time running TARP he retained his title as Assistant Secretary for International Economics and Development, but his international affairs responsibilities were delegated to another Treasury official.

Noticing a lack of necessary expertise in investment within Treasury, Kashkari recruited new staff for the program, some from government and others from industry, ultimately hiring about 100 people by January 2009. Kashkari also chaired the five-member investment committee within Treasury that decided which banks would receive TARP money.

With Bush scheduled to leave office on January 20, 2009, following the November 2008 election, Kashkari's appointment was initially viewed as temporary. There were even plans to replace him before Bush left office. However, after Obama won the election, his transition team asked Kashkari to remain at Treasury after the inauguration for a limited period. He left the Treasury Department on May 1, 2009, replaced at the helm of TARP by Herbert M. Allison.

During his time heading TARP, Kashkari was frequently called to testify before Congressional oversight panels. The House members would often question him hostilely over the politically unpopular program, but at least one, Representative Dennis Kucinich, assured Kashkari privately that he thought Kashkari was doing a great job. Another public critic, Representative Gregory Meeks, later thanked Kashkari for his service. Kashkari also won praise from Paulson and Timothy Geithner, Paulson's successor as Treasury Secretary and Kashkari's boss under the Obama administration. Neil Barofsky, who oversaw TARP within Treasury as a special inspector general, commended Kashkari's commitment to the job but criticized his actions. Elizabeth Warren, who headed TARP's Congressional Oversight Panel, later criticized Kashkari for allegedly promising to focus on smaller banks shortly before Treasury announced additional measures to bail out Citigroup. Kashkari later said that Bush not running for reelection allowed the government to "do things that were deeply unpopular but we knew were the right thing."

=== Return to California ===
One week after his resignation, he and his wife moved to a cabin in rural Northern California near Lake Tahoe as part of what he called a "detox" from Washington. He worked on home improvement projects and helped Paulson write a memoir.

In December 2009 Kashkari was named a managing director at the investment firm Pimco, in charge of new investment initiatives. Pimco, which had traditionally focused on bonds, hired him to broaden its focus into equities; Pimco later named him global head of equities. Kashkari had met Bill Gross, Pimco's co-founder, in December 2007 as part of his work at Treasury. Kashkari's move to Pimco attracted attention because Pimco benefited from the government takeover of Fannie Mae and Freddie Mac, though it did not receive TARP funds. The six equity mutual funds Pimco launched under Kashkari all underperformed benchmarks in 2012. Kashkari attributed this to the funds hedging risk, which decreases returns when stock prices increase.

Kashkari resigned from Pimco in January 2013, citing a desire to return to public service. He was expected to announce a campaign for elected office.

In 2015, the Wall Street Journal said that "the performance of [Pimco equity] funds Mr. Kashkari launched was spotty [and] the firm has since closed some of" them.

== Politics ==
=== 2014 California gubernatorial campaign ===
Kashkari has said he first considered running for Governor of California after Republican nominee Mitt Romney lost the 2012 presidential election to Obama. He spent the year after his resignation from Pimco preparing to campaign in the 2014 gubernatorial election, touring the state, hiring a staff, and meeting with potential donors. He announced his candidacy on January 21, 2014, citing jobs and education as his top priorities. It was his first run for elected office. He finished second to incumbent governor Jerry Brown in the nonpartisan blanket primary and lost to Brown in the November general election. After the campaign, Kashkari published "Lessons from the Trail", a firsthand account of what he learned from his gubernatorial campaign to help future candidates.

==== Primary election ====
Brown was widely expected to finish first in the primary, so Kashkari's principal opponent at this stage was his main rival for second place, Republican state assemblyman Tim Donnelly. Kashkari was seen as a fiscal conservative and social moderate, while Donnelly identified with the right-wing Tea Party movement.

Kashkari enjoyed a significant funding advantage over Donnelly. He raised $1 million within two weeks of announcing his candidacy and went on to raise a total of US$4.1 million, including $2 million of his own money. Republican donors Charles Munger Jr. and Robert Addison Day also spent $400,000 supporting Kashkari through an independent expenditure committee. Donnelly raised only $447,000 (~$581,721 in 2024) in 2014.

For most of the race, Kashkari trailed Donnelly in public opinion polls. Kashkari's moderate views on social issues, involvement with TARP, and vote for Obama in 2008 were unpopular with many Republican voters, who were more enthusiastic about Donnelly. Other Republicans feared that if Donnelly advanced to the general election he would not only lose to Brown but also hurt other Republicans running for office because of his narrow appeal to white conservatives, staunch right-wing views, inflammatory rhetoric, and criminal record. The perceived threat from Donnelly attracted endorsements for Kashkari from national Republicans including Romney, Jeb Bush, Condoleezza Rice, and Karl Rove, as well as California Republicans including Pete Wilson and Darrell Issa. These advantages allowed Kashkari not to campaign farther right than he wanted to.

Kashkari's fundraising advantage allowed him pay for more advertising in the last weeks of the race. The first poll showing him ahead of Donnelly came out days before the election. In the June 3 primary, Kashkari came in second with 19% of the vote, and Donnelly came in third with 15%. Brown beat them both, with 55%.

==== General election ====
General election results by county. Incumbent governor Jerry Brown won, 60%–40%. Brown: 50–60% 60–70% 70–80% 80–90% Kashkari: 50–60% 60–70% 70–80%

Brown, a Democrat, was long considered the favorite to win the general election. His approval ratings were high, and as of the end of the primary his campaign had US$21 million. Kashkari, by contrast, spent almost all his campaign money to beat Donnelly, and additional financial support from the national or state Republican Parties was unlikely. Kashkari cited George W. Bush's upset victory over Ann Richards in the 1994 election for Governor of Texas as a model for an upset against a popular Democratic governor.

Kashkari lost the November 4, 2014 general election to Governor Jerry Brown by approximately 1.4 million votes, with Brown winning 60% of the vote. Brown won the largest gubernatorial victory since 1986 despite running a low-key campaign.

=== Record of voting ===
The San Francisco Chronicle reported in January 2014 that, since 1998, Kashkari had been eligible to vote in 23 elections in California and Pennsylvania but had only voted in 13 (i.e., 57%) of them. His campaign disputed some aspects of the reporting and said that Kashkari's Treasury Department service proves his commitment to civic life. Kashkari later acknowledged his imperfect voting record.

=== Political positions ===
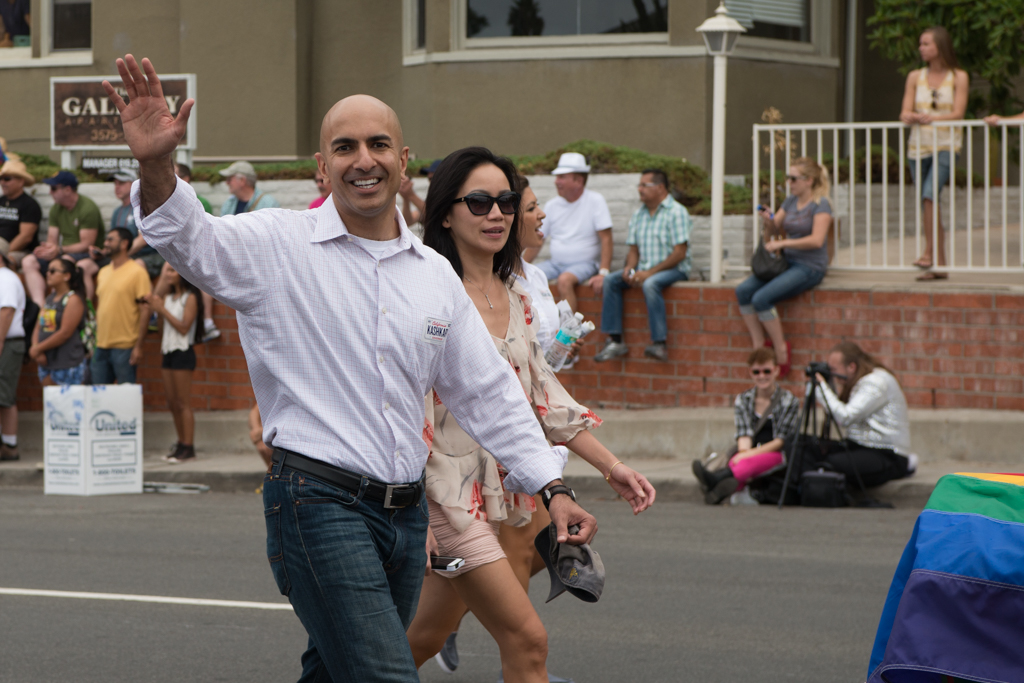
Neel Kashkari marching in the 2014 San Diego LGBT Pride Parade

Kashkari has been a Republican his whole life. In a 2008 speech to the American Enterprise Institute, Kashkari described himself as "a free-market Republican". In 2013, he described himself as a "pro-growth Republican". He opposes most of Obama's economic agenda and supports cutting business regulations. He has called for cutting Social Security and Medicare and replacing the Patient Protection and Affordable Care Act. In 2012, he voted against California's Proposition 30, which raised taxes in the state, and for Proposition 32, which would have weakened labor unions' political influence. In a March 2014 interview, he praised Wisconsin governor Scott Walker's controversial policies limiting collective bargaining.

On social issues, he has described himself as libertarian and "a different kind of Republican", supporting abortion rights, same-sex marriage, and a path to legal status for illegal immigrants. He voted against California's Proposition 8, which banned same-sex marriage in 2008. In 2013, he was one of 131 Republicans who signed a pro-marriage equality amicus curiae brief submitted to the U.S. Supreme Court as part of Hollingsworth v. Perry, the case in which the final appeal against the previously-found unconstitutionality of Proposition 8 was rejected for lack of standing. Kashkari owns four guns and considers waiting periods and background checks before purchasing a firearm to be reasonable.

On environmental issues, he voted against California's Proposition 23, which would have suspended the state law that limits greenhouse gas emissions. He believes climate change is real and man-made. He has spoken positively of fracking and offshore oil drilling and negatively of California's cap-and-trade program.

Kashkari cites Paulson, Mitch Daniels, and Jeb Bush as political mentors. He voted for Obama in the 2008 presidential election and Romney in the 2012 election.

In March 2014, Kashkari proposed waiving state income taxes for 10 years for businesses that move to California with at least 100 jobs; waiving state income taxes for California companies that build new manufacturing plants in the state; expanding hydraulic fracturing (fracking) of oil deposits; reducing environmental regulation; and increasing water storage in response to the state's ongoing drought. Economists and political experts interviewed by the Los Angeles Times were skeptical of the plan's chances in the Democratic-dominated California Legislature and of its potential effectiveness were it to be passed.

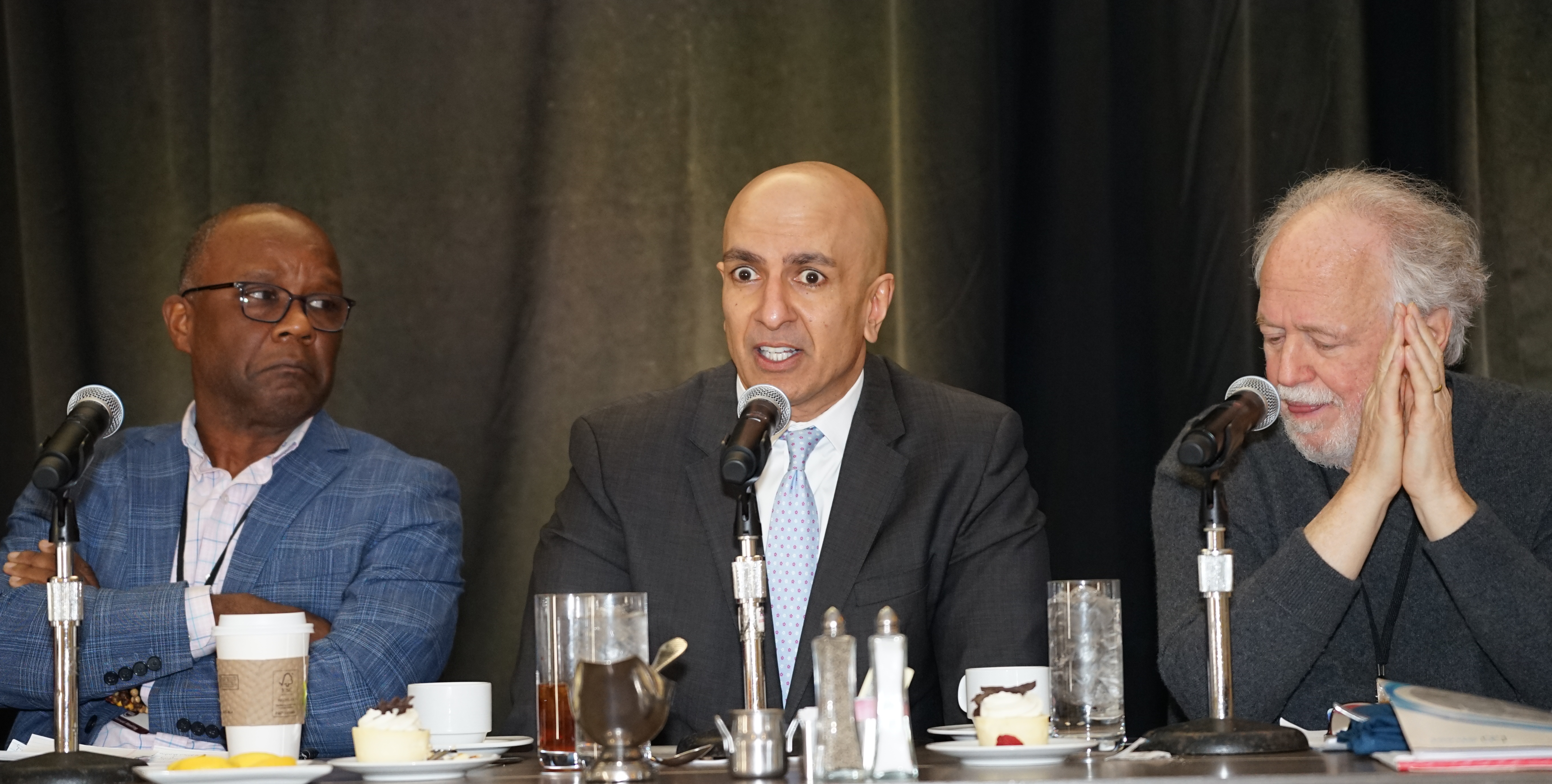
William Rodgers, Kashkari, Lawrence Mishel at AEA 2026 lunch honoring Bill Spriggs

In January 2020, Kashkari and Alan Page proposed amending a portion of the Minnesota State Constitution to read, "All children have a fundamental right to a quality public education that fully prepares them."

At a January 2021 Minneapolis Federal Reserve event on racism and the economy, Kashkari commented on the contrast between how the rioters at the U.S. Capitol were treated compared to black Americans, saying, "If those were Black militants, armed militants, storming the U.S. Capitol, I think they'd all be dead right now [ . . .] That is the most stark example of racism and disparities in our society."

== Federal Reserve Bank of Minneapolis ==
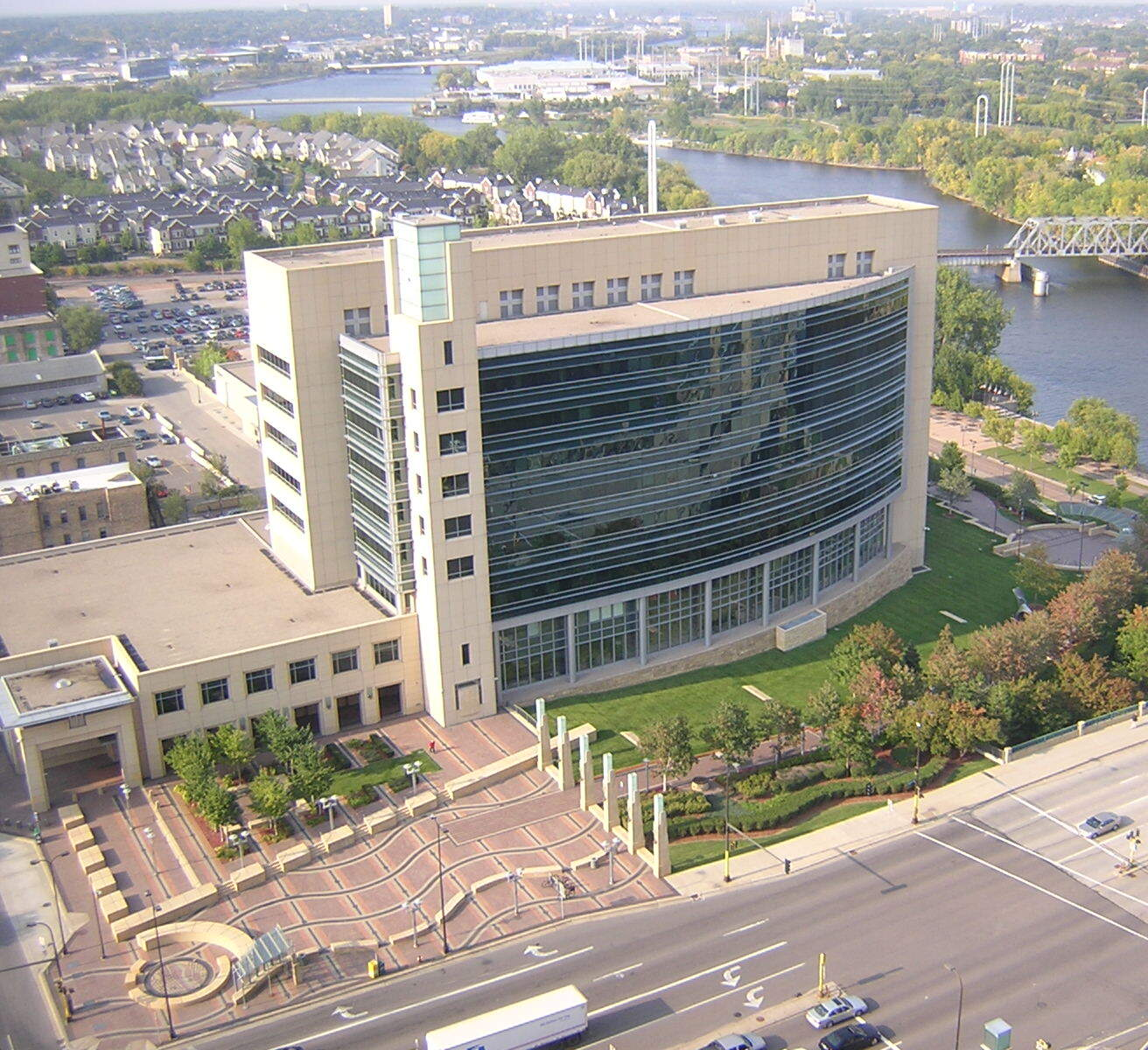
Kashkari has been president of the Minneapolis Fed since January 1, 2016.

In early November 2015 Kashkari was named president and CEO of the Minneapolis Fed. He was chosen by the Minneapolis bank board (excepting representatives from the financial industry), approved 5–0 by the Federal Reserve Board in Washington and assumed the Minneapolis position on January 1, 2016. With the presidents of the New York (William C. Dudley), Dallas (Robert Steven Kaplan) and Philadelphia (Patrick T. Harker) regional Fed banks, Kashkari will become the fourth sitting regional Fed chief to have Goldman Sachs on his resume. Kaplan and Harker both assumed their positions in 2015.

On February 16, 2016 while giving a speech at the Brookings Institution, Kashkari recommended that in order to stave off another potential financial meltdown, the big banks should be broken up, saying, "I believe the biggest banks are still too big to fail and continue to pose a significant, ongoing risk to our economy."

== Personal life ==
Kashkari is a practicing Hindu. He said in 2009 that he began praying while working on TARP, having been especially affected when a colleague had a heart attack at work.

Kashkari met his ex-wife Minal Jeshanker (now Kotterman) in college at the University of Illinois. They married in a traditional Hindu ceremony in Chicago, and she supported him through his time at Wharton while working as an engineer at Northrop Grumman. Kashkari filed for divorce in November 2011 and later described the split as amicable. They have no children.

Kashkari married Christine Ong in California's Sugar Pine Point State Park in August 2015. In February 2019, Kashkari and Ong welcomed their first child, a girl named Ulysses Sabine Kashkari.

== See also ==
- List of Indian Americans
- List of U.S. executive branch czars
- List of Wharton School alumni

== Works cited ==
- Andrew Ross Sorkin. Too Big to Fail. Penguin Books, 2009, 2010. ISBN 978-0-14-311824-4

Party political offices
| Preceded by Meg Whitman | Republican nominee for Governor of California; 2014 | Succeeded by John Cox |
Other offices
| Preceded by Narayana Kocherlakota | President of the Federal Reserve Bank of Minneapolis; 2016–present | Incumbent |
