= Federal Reserve Bank of Minneapolis =

Member Bank of Federal Reserve in Minneapolis, Minnesota, U.S.

Coordinates: 44°59′04″N 93°16′03″W

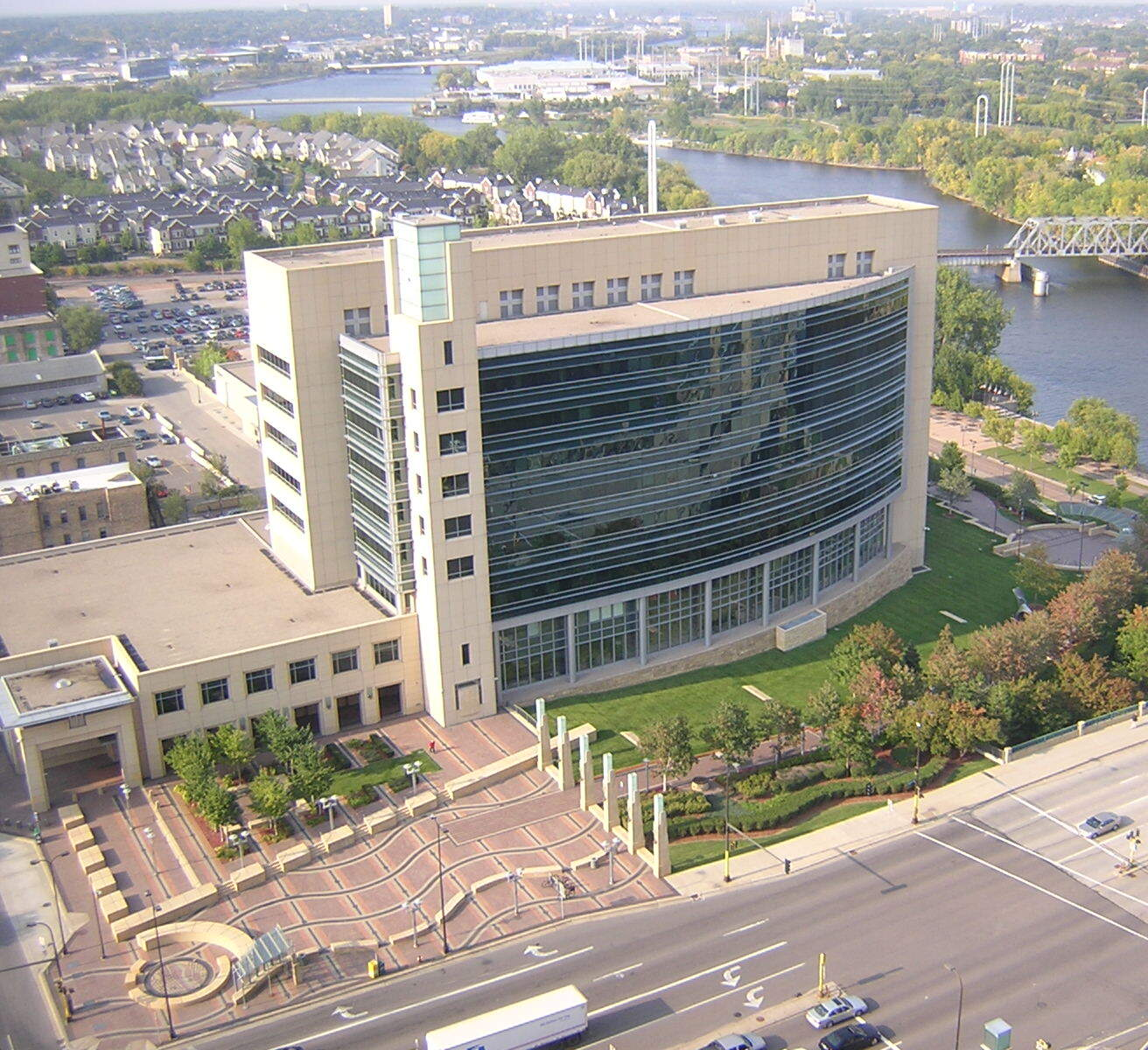
- The Federal Reserve Bank of Minneapolis in 2008
- Central bank of: Ninth District: Minnesota; Montana; North Dakota; South Dakota Parts of: Michigan; Wisconsin
- Headquarters: 90 Hennepin Avenue; Minneapolis, Minnesota, U.S.
- Established: May 18, 1914 (112 years ago)
- President: Neel Kashkari
- Website: minneapolisfed.org
- The Federal Reserve Bank of Minneapolis is one of 12 regional banks that make up the Federal Reserve System

The Federal Reserve Bank of Minneapolis is one of the twelve Federal Reserve Banks of the United States. It is responsible for the Ninth District of the Federal Reserve System, which encompasses Minnesota, Montana, North Dakota, South Dakota, northwestern Wisconsin, and the Upper Peninsula of Michigan. The district is headquartered in Minneapolis, Minnesota, and has a branch office in Helena, Montana. The bank's chief executive officer and president is Neel Kashkari. Although its geographical territory is the third largest of the twelve Federal Reserve banks, it serves the smallest population base of the system.

== Staff ==
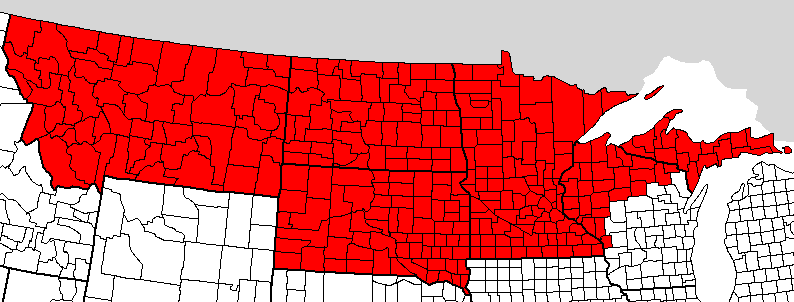
Map of the Ninth District

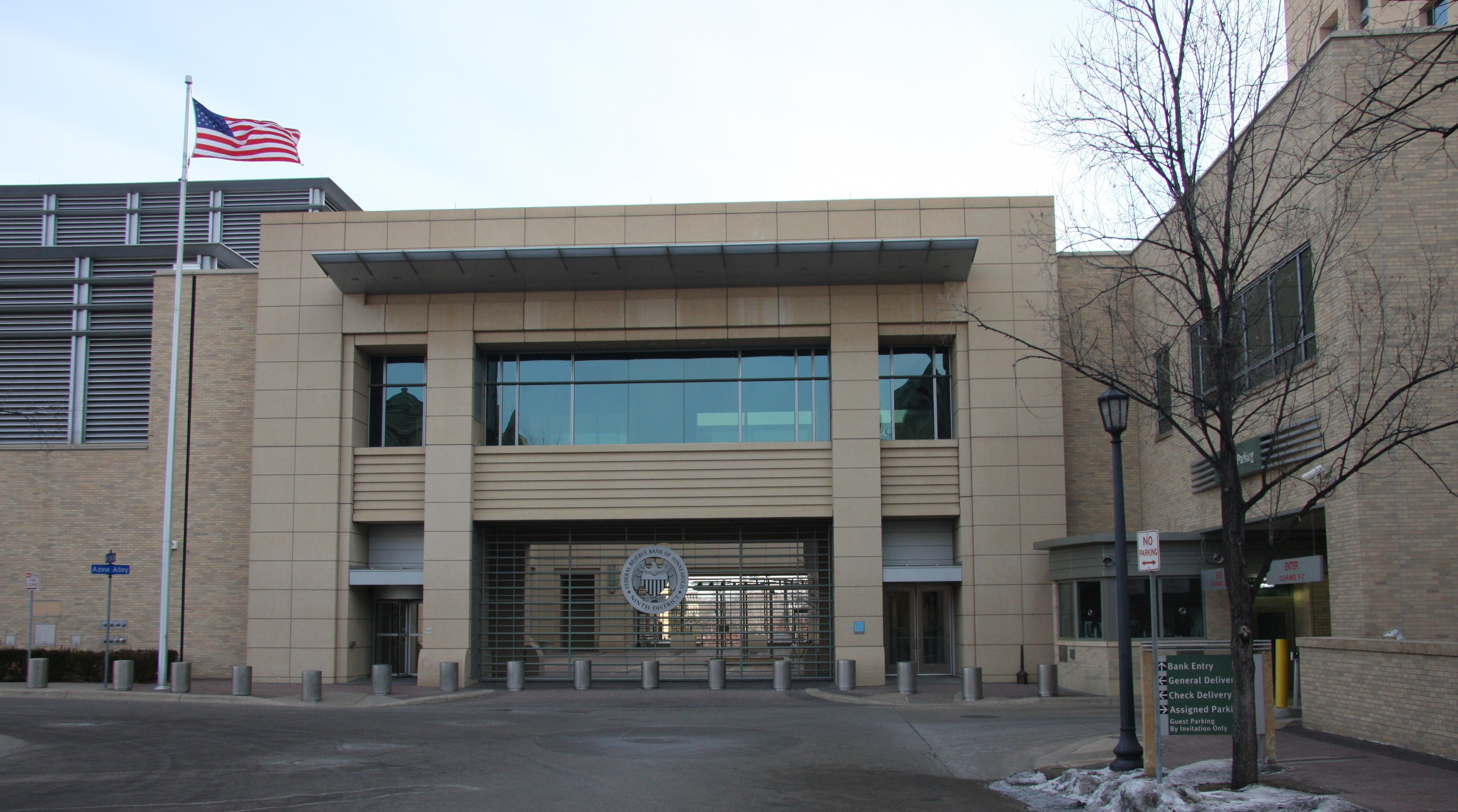
Entrance on 1st Street North

The Minneapolis Federal Reserve bank is an organization with more than 1,000 employees.

Neel Kashkari became the bank's president in 2016, succeeding Narayana Kocherlakota. The Minneapolis Fed has strong ties to the economics department at the University of Minnesota. Economist and Nobel laureate Edward Prescott was affiliated with both institutions for many years. The Bank publishes The Region, a magazine featuring articles about economic policy and interviews with famous economists. The 1976-1978 member of the Federal Reserve Board of Governors, David M. Lilly, was chairman of the bank from 1973-1974.

== Bank buildings ==
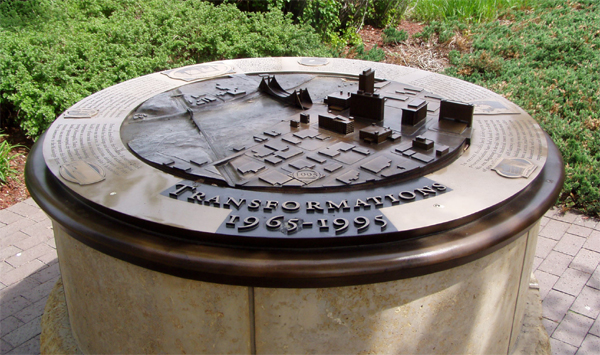
Several sculptures on the Federal Reserve grounds depict growth along the river front area of Minneapolis

Three buildings have served as headquarters for the district, all within a few blocks of each other. All three buildings are standing and in use as of 2024.

=== 1915–1973 ===
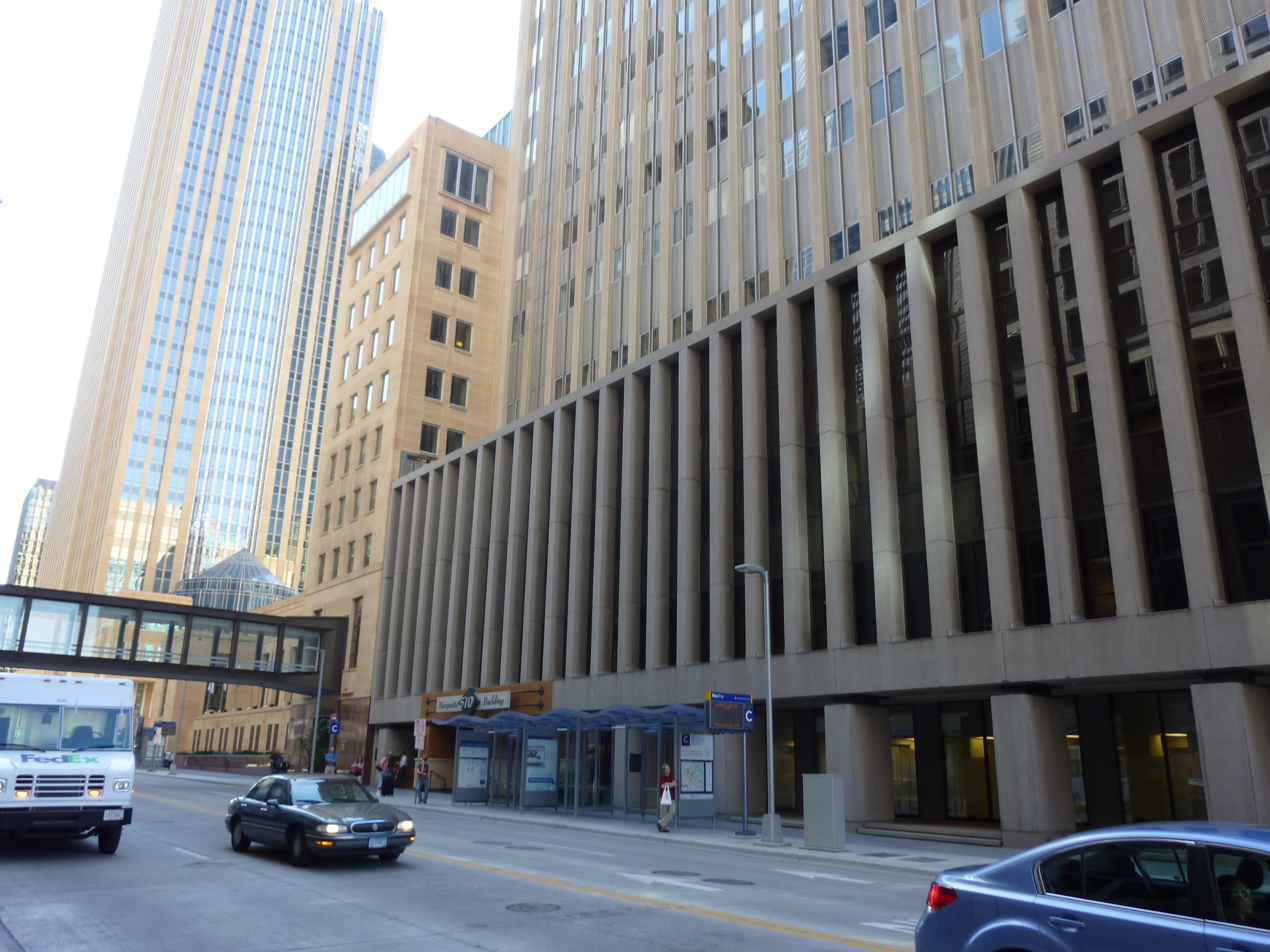
Today renovated past recognition, 510 Marquette was the first headquarters of the bank

The first building for the Minneapolis Federal Reserve bank is located at 510 Marquette Avenue, at the corner of Marquette Avenue and 5th Street South in Minneapolis, right next to the Nicollet Mall station of the METRO Blue and Green light rail lines, and across from the Soo Line Building. The building was designed by Cass Gilbert, architect of the Minnesota State Capitol and the bank vault was designed by Frederick S. Holmes. It was completed in 1915. The building was unusual in that there were no windows on the lower walls close to the street—from the start, large bricks filled in the spaces where windows would be expected. Only up at the top was anyone able to look out from the building. The structure only became more strange in the 1950s, when a small skyscraper eight stories tall was added on top. The modern superstructure clashed with the granite Roman columns on the building's façade.

After the Fed moved to its second building in 1973, the new owner, a partnership of New York developers, Peter V. Tishman and Jay Marc Schwamm, had the lower portion covered with something that was a better match to the skyscraper "hat" on top. The 3-foot-thick (0.91 m), windowless, lower floors were stripped of the granite and replaced with a "bird cage" limestone facade (designed by Minneapolis architect Robert Cerny) and a totally artificially sustained natural 3,000-square-foot (280 m^{2}) garden of ficus trees and pools of water (designed by San Francisco landscape architectural firm of Lawrence Halprin). At the time it was the largest totally artificially sustained garden within an office building in the United States; it had been modeled after the Ford Foundation Building in New York City, which has a larger garden, but also one that relies to some extent on outside natural light. There was also the need to remove the interior, independently supported five-story vault so that the building could be connected to the adjacent F&M Bank Building, and also become part of the second floor, Minneapolis Skyway System. After a three-year development the National City Bank of Minneapolis (now part of BMO Bank) moved into the building as its principal tenant. After the renovation, the building received the Minneapolis Committee on the Urban Environment award for contributed the most to Minneapolis's urban environment.

In 2013, the 510 Marquette building was sold for $6.69 million. At the time it was reported to have 198,552 square feet. It was purchased by Marquette Partners LLC, an affiliate of Minneapolis-based Swervo Development. The seller was OP2 Marquette, an affiliate of Opportunity Advisors of Eden Prairie, Minnesota. Opportunity Advisors had purchased the building in May 2012 for somewhere around $5-$6 million, about one-fourth of its 1998 selling price.

=== 1973–1997 ===
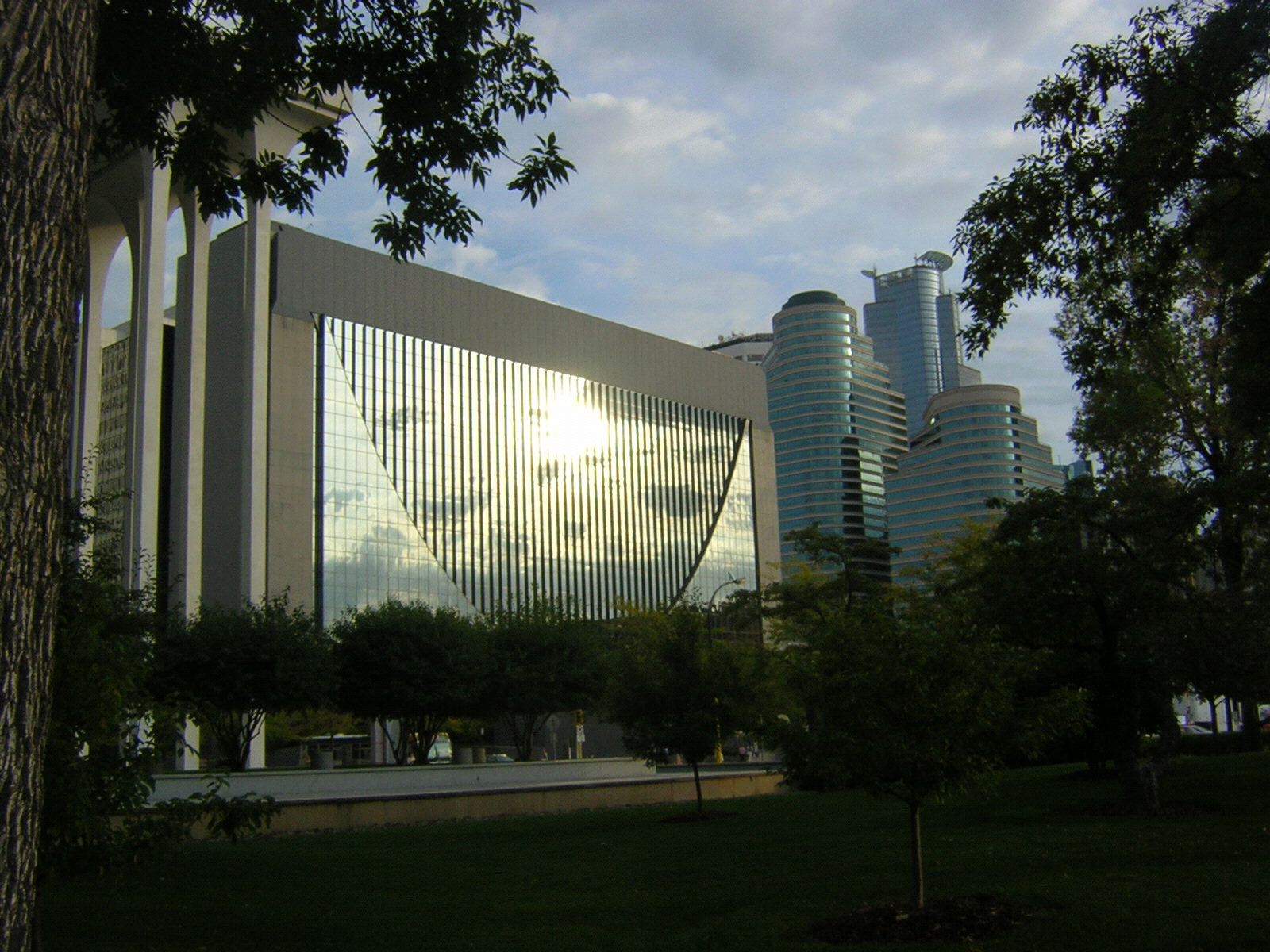
Former Minneapolis Federal Reserve, now Marquette Plaza

The Federal Reserve moved two blocks away on Marquette Avenue to a building now known as Marquette Plaza, which is constructed much like a suspension bridge with cables strung between pillars at the ends carrying the load. Design problems, along with asbestos contamination, led the Federal Reserve to decide to move into a new complex and sell the old structure. The new owner rehabilitated the building and added on, and the building temporarily housed the central Minneapolis Public Library while its new building was under construction.

=== 1997–present ===
Designed by architecture firm HOK, a complex along the Mississippi River now serves as home to the Minneapolis Fed, which moved there in 1997. The address was set as 90 Hennepin Avenue to match the 9th district designation. It is located on the site of the former Minneapolis Great Northern Depot adjacent to the Hennepin Avenue Bridge and the Pacific sawmill once owned by T. B. Walker and George A. Camp.

== Board of Directors ==
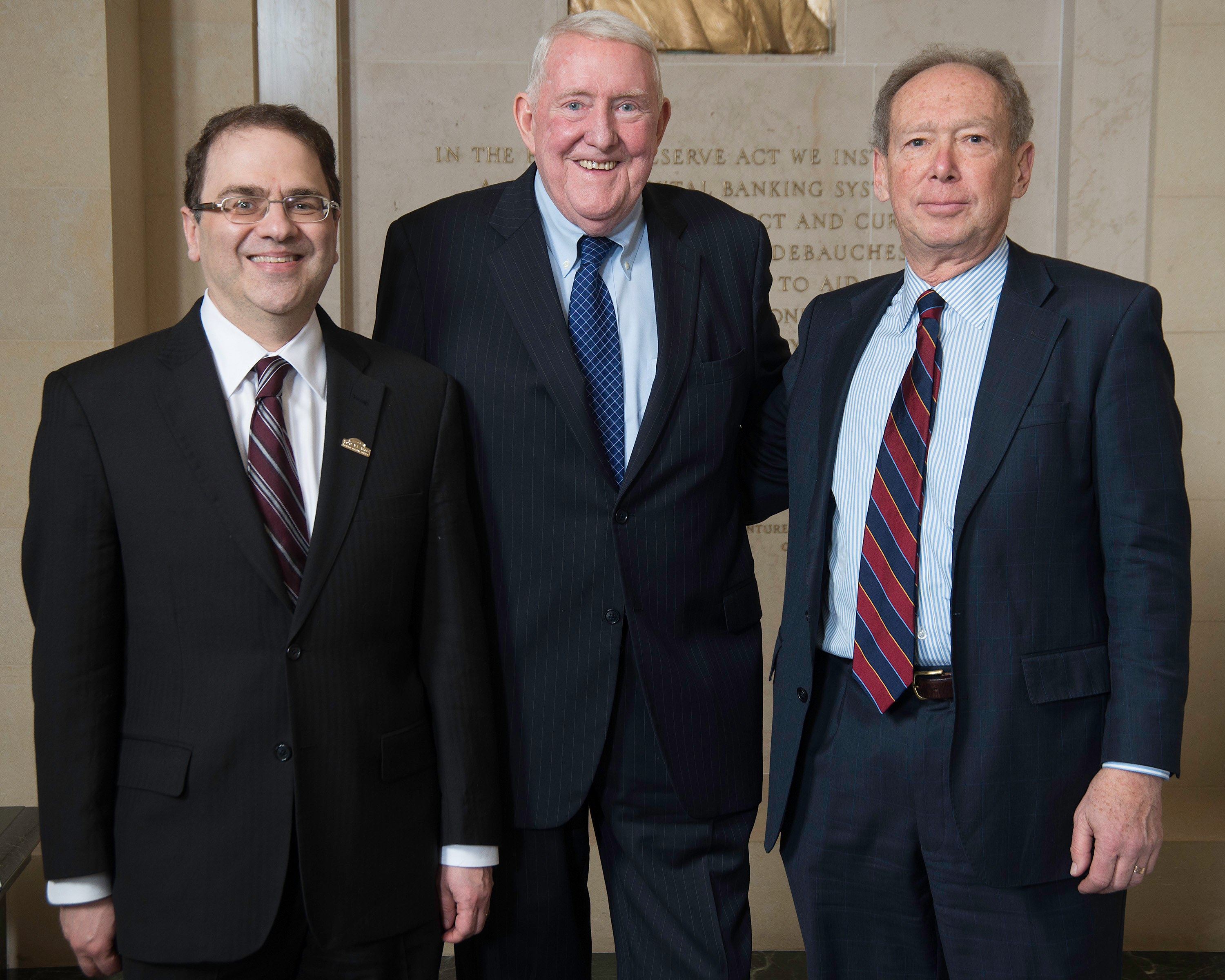
Former Bank Presidents (left to right) Narayana Kocherlakota (2009–2015), E. Gerald Corrigan (1980–1984), and Gary H. Stern (1985–2009)

The following people are on the board of directors as of 2025. Class A directors are elected by member banks to represent member banks. Class B directors are elected by member banks to represent the public. Class C directors are appointed by the Board of Governors to represent the public. Their terms expire on December 31 of the indicated year.

Members of Board of Directors
Director	Title	Director Class	Term Expires
Laura Clark	President and CEO, Opportunity Bank of Montana, Helena, Montana	A	2027
Brenda K. Foster	Chairman, President, and CEO, First Western Bank and Trust, Minot, North Dakota	A	2025
Gerald Jacobson	President and CEO, Northwestern Bank, Chippewa Falls, Wisconsin	A	2026
Chelsie Glaubitz Gabiou	President, Minneapolis Regional Labor Federation, AFL-CIO, Minneapolis, Minnesota	B	2026
Lakota Vogel	Executive Director, Four Bands Community Fund, Eagle Butte, South Dakota	B	2025
Andrea Walsh	President and CEO, HealthPartners, Minneapolis, Minnesota	B	2027
Chris Hilger (chair)	Chairman, President, and CEO, Securian Financial Group, Saint Paul, Minnesota	C	2025
Paul Williams (deputy chair)	Founder and Principal Consultant, Williams Community Supports, Minneapolis, Minnesota	C	2027
Jay Debertin	President and CEO, CHS Inc., Inver Grove Heights, Minnesota	C	2026

== See also ==
- Federal Reserve Act
- Federal Reserve System
- Federal Reserve Districts
- Federal Reserve Branches
- Federal Reserve Bank of Minneapolis Helena Branch
- Structure of the Federal Reserve System
