= Narayana Kocherlakota =

American economist

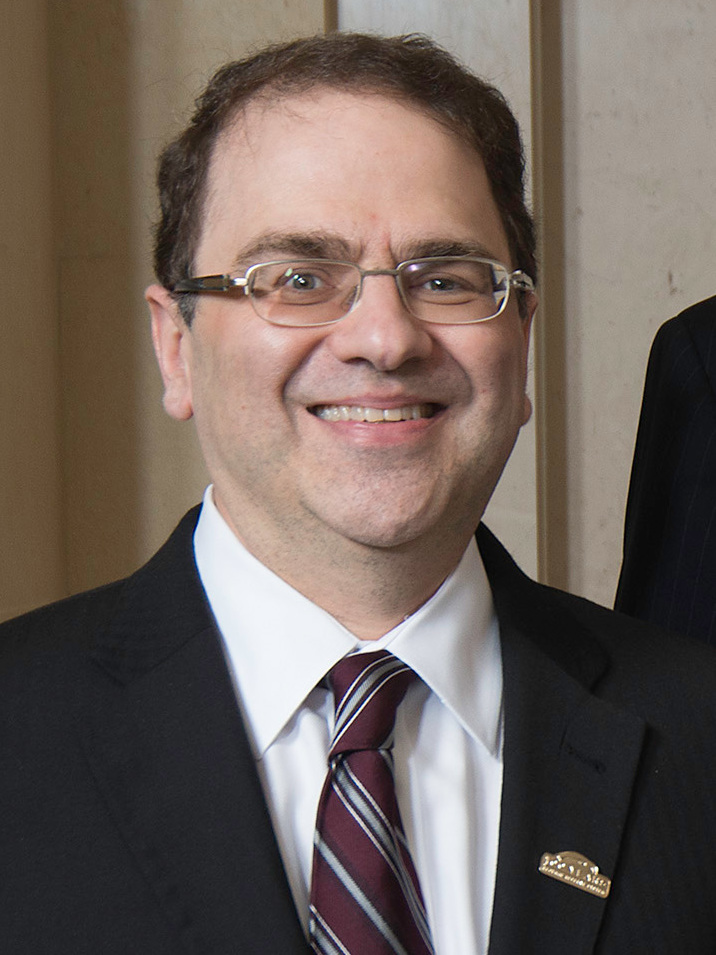
- Kocherlakota in 2014

12th President of the Federal Reserve Bank of Minneapolis
- In office October 8, 2009 – December 31, 2015
- Preceded by: Gary H. Stern
- Succeeded by: Neel Kashkari

Personal details
- Born: October 12, 1963 (age 62) Baltimore, Maryland, U.S.
- Education: Princeton University (BA); University of Chicago (MA, PhD)

Academic background
- Doctoral advisor: Lars Peter Hansen

Narayana Rao Kocherlakota (born October 12, 1963) is an American economist and the Lionel W. McKenzie Professor of Economics at the University of Rochester. Previously, he served as the 12th president of the Federal Reserve Bank of Minneapolis until December 31, 2015. Appointed in 2009, he joined the Federal Open Markets Committee in 2011. In 2012, he was named one of the top 100 Global Thinkers by Foreign Policy magazine.

== Early life and education ==
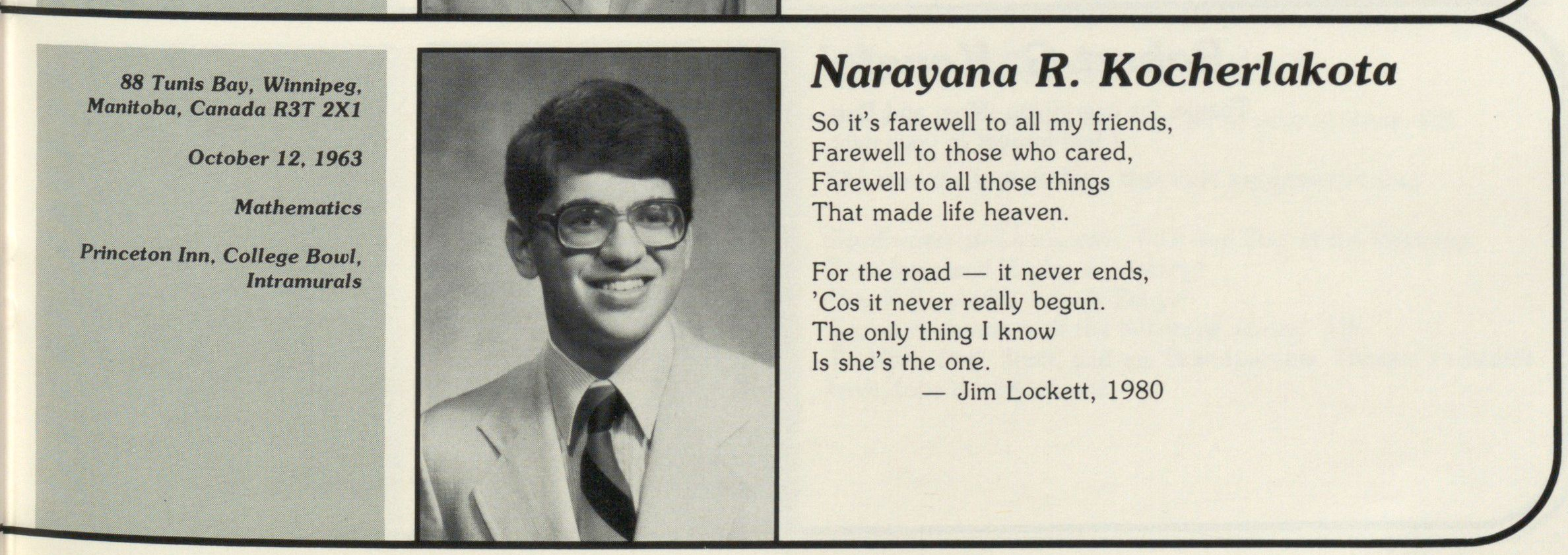
Kocherlakota in the Princeton University yearbook, 1983

Kocherlakota was born in Baltimore, Maryland, to a European American mother and a Telugu Hindu father originally from the Coastal Andhra (Godavari and Krishna districts) region of southern India. Both of his parents earned PhDs in statistics from Johns Hopkins University. They taught at the University of Manitoba in Winnipeg, Manitoba, Canada, where Kocherlakota spent most of his childhood.

He entered Princeton University at age 15 and graduated with an A.B. in Mathematics in 1983 after completing a senior thesis titled "Optimal income taxation" under the supervision of Robert M. Anderson. He earned a Ph.D. in economics from the University of Chicago in 1987.

== Career ==
=== Academic ===
Kocherlakota's first faculty position was at the Kellogg School of Management at Northwestern University. He subsequently was a professor of economics at the University of Iowa, Stanford University, and the University of Minnesota. He served as the chair of the University of Minnesota's economic department from 2006 until 2008, As chair of the University of Minnesota's Economics Department, Kocherlakota decisively "recruited multiple economists to the school at once" (nine new hires within a two-year span), which improved its national rank in the U.S. News & World Report from 15th to 10th place among graduate programs in economics. Kocherlakota's research in monetary economics, asset pricing, and public finance has appeared in Econometrica, Journal of Political Economy, Journal of Economic Theory, Journal of Monetary Economics, and Journal of Money, Credit and Banking.

He is one of the founders of "New Dynamic Public Finance", which is an approach to optimal tax design "given only minimal restrictions on the set of possible tax instruments, and on the nature of shocks affecting people in the economy". It establishes a "formal connection between the problem of dynamic optimal taxation and dynamic principal-agent contracting theory,..[which] means that the properties of solutions to principal-agent problems can be used to determine the properties of optimal tax systems". His contributions include articles on optimal taxation and optimal unemployment insurance. He published a graduate textbook on the subject in 2010 called The New Dynamic Public Finance by Princeton University Press.

In 2008, he was among 270 economists who signed a petition protesting the Obama administration's economic stimulus plan that eventually passed and signed into law in February 2009. Paid for by the Cato Institute, a libertarian think tank, the petition was published in several major national newspapers. According to Kocherlakota, he signed the petition not necessarily because he was opposed to the stimulus, but because he thought it was important to point out that the beneficial effects of an economic stimulus were not "a settled question within the academe."

=== Minneapolis Fed presidency ===
On October 8, 2009, Kocherlakota assumed the presidency of the Federal Reserve Bank of Minneapolis following the retirement of Gary H. Stern. Kocherlakota had been a consultant at the Minneapolis Fed since 1999.

In January 2011, Kocherlakota contested the idea that the Federal Reserve caused the U.S. housing bubble in the 2000s. He noted that "land prices started to rise in 1996 and that prices grew 11% per year between 1996 and 2001, when the Fed's target rate was between 4.75% and 6.5% ...[,] 'hardly ... loose monetary policy.'" In August 2011, he was one of the three governors who voted against the statement promising to keep the short-term interest rate near zero for two more years.

After being appointed to the Minneapolis Fed in 2009, he underwent a "dramatic and unexpected intellectual transformation" from monetary hawk to dove, signaled in a September 2012 speech delivered at Gogebic Community College in Ironwood, Michigan, in which he advocated that the Fed "keep the fed funds rate extraordinarily low until the unemployment rate fall[s] below 5.5 percent" to everyone's surprise. He said that he realized that labor-market problems like unemployment were, in fact, related to demand. He cast the only dissenting vote at the October 2014 Fed meeting, during which the Committee voted to conclude the QE asset purchase program, because of his view that inflation rates are still too low and that an interest-rate hike in 2015 would be a "mistake", especially as inflation is unlikely to reach the targeted 2% until 2018.

Kocherlakota is the Lionel W. McKenzie Professor of Economics at the University of Rochester since January 1, 2016.

== Personal life ==
Kocherlakota is married to Barbara McCutcheon, who holds a Ph.D. in economics from the University of Chicago. He enjoys rap music, Jack White, and American football.

Other offices
Preceded by Gary H. Stern	President of the Federal Reserve Bank of Minneapolis; 2009–2015	Succeeded by Neel Kashkari
