= Assistant Secretary of the Treasury for Financial Stability =

United States office

The assistant secretary of the treasury for financial stability was the head of the Office of Financial Stability in the United States Department of the Treasury.

The position was created on October 3, 2008, by the Emergency Economic Stabilization Act of 2008, the act that created the Office of Financial Stability to administer the Troubled Asset Relief Program.

By law, the assistant secretary of the treasury for financial stability is appointed by the president of the United States with the advice and consent of the United States Senate. During a vacancy, the United States secretary of the treasury is authorized to appoint an acting assistant secretary of the treasury for financial stability.

The position was abolished after Timothy Massad.

== List of assistant secretaries of the treasury for financial Ss tability ==
Name	Picture	Assumed office	Left office	President appointed by	Secretary served under
Neel Kashkari (Acting)		October 6, 2008	May 1, 2009	George W. Bush	Henry Paulson; Timothy Geithner
Herbert M. Allison		June 2009	September 2010	Barack Obama	Timothy Geithner
Timothy Massad		June 30, 2011	June 5, 2014	Barack Obama	Timothy Geithner; Jack Lew

== See also ==
- Assistant Secretary of the Treasury
