= Herbert M. Allison =

American businessman (1943–2013)

Herb Allison
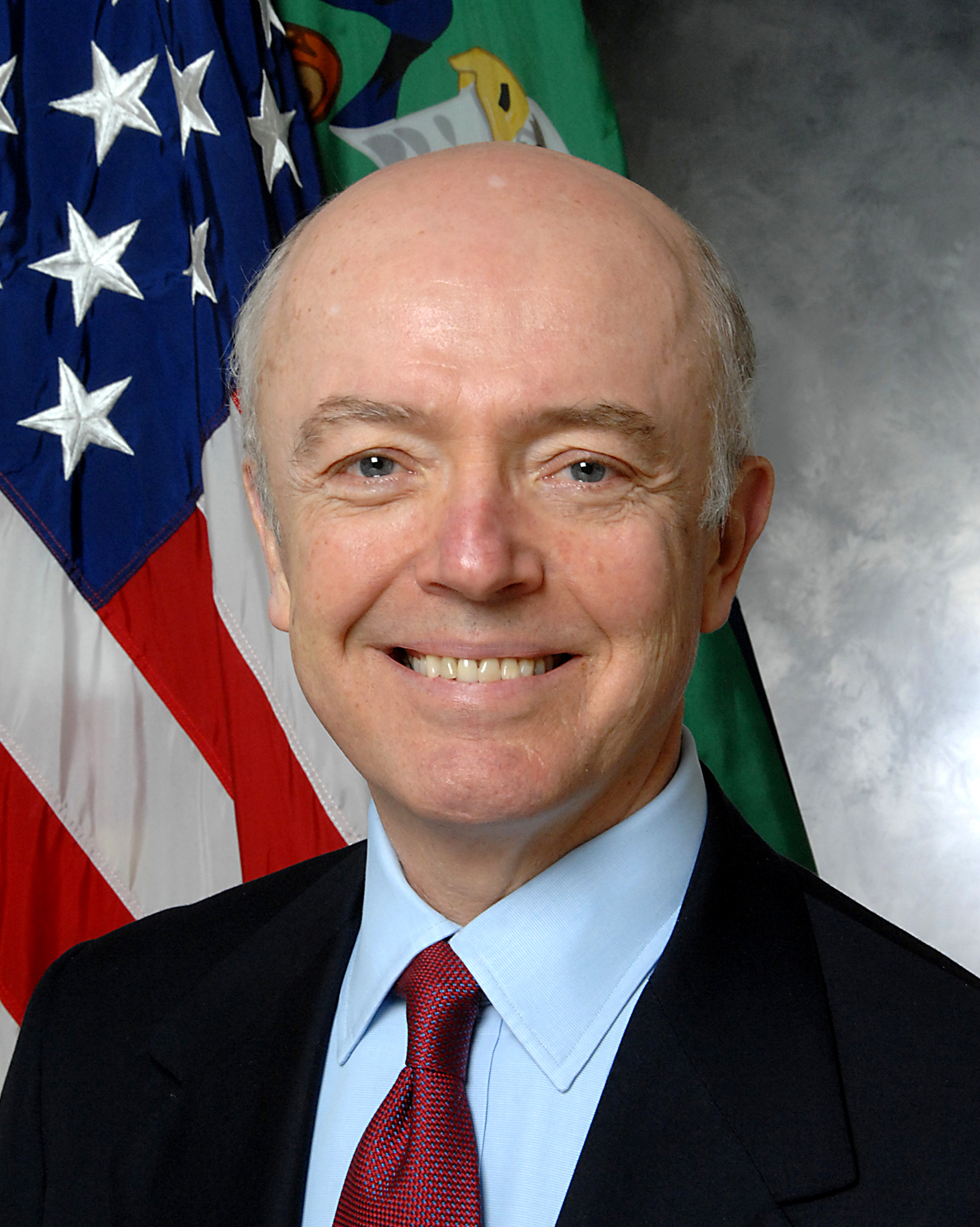
- Official portrait, 2009

Assistant Secretary of the Treasury for Financial Stability
- In office June 2009 – September 2010
- President: Barack Obama
- Preceded by: Neel Kashkari
- Succeeded by: Timothy Massad

Personal details
- Born: Herbert Monroe Allison Jr. August 2, 1943 Pittsburgh, Pennsylvania, U.S.
- Died: July 14, 2013 (aged 69) Westport, Connecticut, U.S.
- Spouse: Simin Allison (Nazemi) (m. 1974)
- Children: 2
- Education: Yale University (BA); Stanford University (MBA)
- Occupation: Assistant Secretary of the Treasury for Financial Stability (2009–2010); Chairman, CEO of TIAA-CREF (NYC, 2002–2008); President of Merrill Lynch (1995–1999)
- Known for: Key figure in the TARP program
- Military career
- Allegiance: United States
- Branch: United States Navy
- Service years: 1965–1969
- Rank: Lieutenant
- Conflicts: Vietnam War

Herbert Monroe Allison Jr. (August 2, 1943 – July 14, 2013) was an American businessman who oversaw the Troubled Asset Relief Program (TARP) as Assistant Secretary of the Treasury for Financial Stability from 2009 to 2010. His previous positions included president and CEO of Fannie Mae, a post to which he was appointed in September 2008, after Fannie was placed into conservatorship. Prior to that, Allison was chairman, president and chief executive officer of TIAA from 2002 until his retirement in 2008.

== Early life and education ==
Herbert Allison was born in Pittsburgh, Pennsylvania, to Herbert M. Allison, Sr., an FBI agent, and Mary Boardman Allison. He grew up in Garden City, New York, and earned a B.A. in philosophy from Yale University in 1965.

Following college, he volunteered for service as an officer in the United States Navy. Following commission as an ensign, Allison served on two ships: the destroyer USS Arnold J. Isbell (DD-869) and amphibious command ship USS Taconic (LCC-17). After promotion to lieutenant, he then served a tour in-country in South Vietnam at the Coastal Surveillance Center, Nha Trang, where he was awarded the Navy Commendation Medal with Combat "V" for performance during Operation Market Time.

Upon completion of naval service in 1969, Allison received his M.B.A. from the Stanford University Graduate School of Business in 1971.

== Career ==
Allison began his career at Merrill Lynch as an associate in investment banking and served variously as treasurer, director of human resources, chief financial officer, executive vice president, president, chief operating officer and as a member of the board during his 28 years there. While at Merrill Lynch, he worked in New York, London, Paris, and Tehran.

After the stock market crash of 1987, Allison revised the bonus structure at Merrill Lynch, adding compensation based on company performance to a plan that was previously based on individual performance alone. "Herbies," as the options became known, were controversial at first but ended up being extremely successful both for the company and the individuals involved.

In 1998, Allison played an instrumental role in preventing the collapse of Long Term Capital Management, a hedge fund whose rapid downturn in September of that year threatened the stability of the financial system. Allison proposed the solution that ultimately was adopted by fourteen Wall Street institutions. The participating institutions were all paid back.

After leaving Merrill Lynch in mid-1999, he served as National Finance Chair for U.S. Senator John McCain's first Presidential Campaign.

From 2000 to 2002, Allison was president and chief executive officer of the Alliance for Lifelong Learning, Inc., which offered online, college-level courses to adults.

In 2002, Allison was named chairman, president, and chief executive officer of TIAA, a Fortune 100 financial services organization that is the leading retirement provider for people who work in the academic, research, medical, and cultural fields. During his tenure, assets under management at the firm increased from $264 billion to over $435 billion. The company underwent significant change under his leadership, broadening its product lines beyond pensions to include financial services, life insurance, college savings plans, mutual funds, IRAs, and other offerings. The company also re-focused on customer service, adding offices closer to campuses, for example. Allison retired from TIAA in 2008, and was succeeded by Roger W. Ferguson, Jr.

Allison resigned as assistant secretary for financial stability in September 2010. Timothy Massad, who had been chief counsel to the Office of Financial Stability, succeeded him.

Allison was a member of several boards and advisory councils, including Time Warner, Yale School of Management, Stanford Graduate School of Business, and the International Advisory Committee of the Federal Reserve Bank of New York. From 2003 to 2005 he was a director of the New York Stock Exchange.

Allison died on July 14, 2013, at his home in Westport, Connecticut of a possible heart attack. He was 69.

== See also ==
- List of prominent Stanford Graduate School of Business alumni
- List of U.S. executive branch "czars"
- List of Yale University people
