= Gary H. Stern =

American economist

Gary Stern
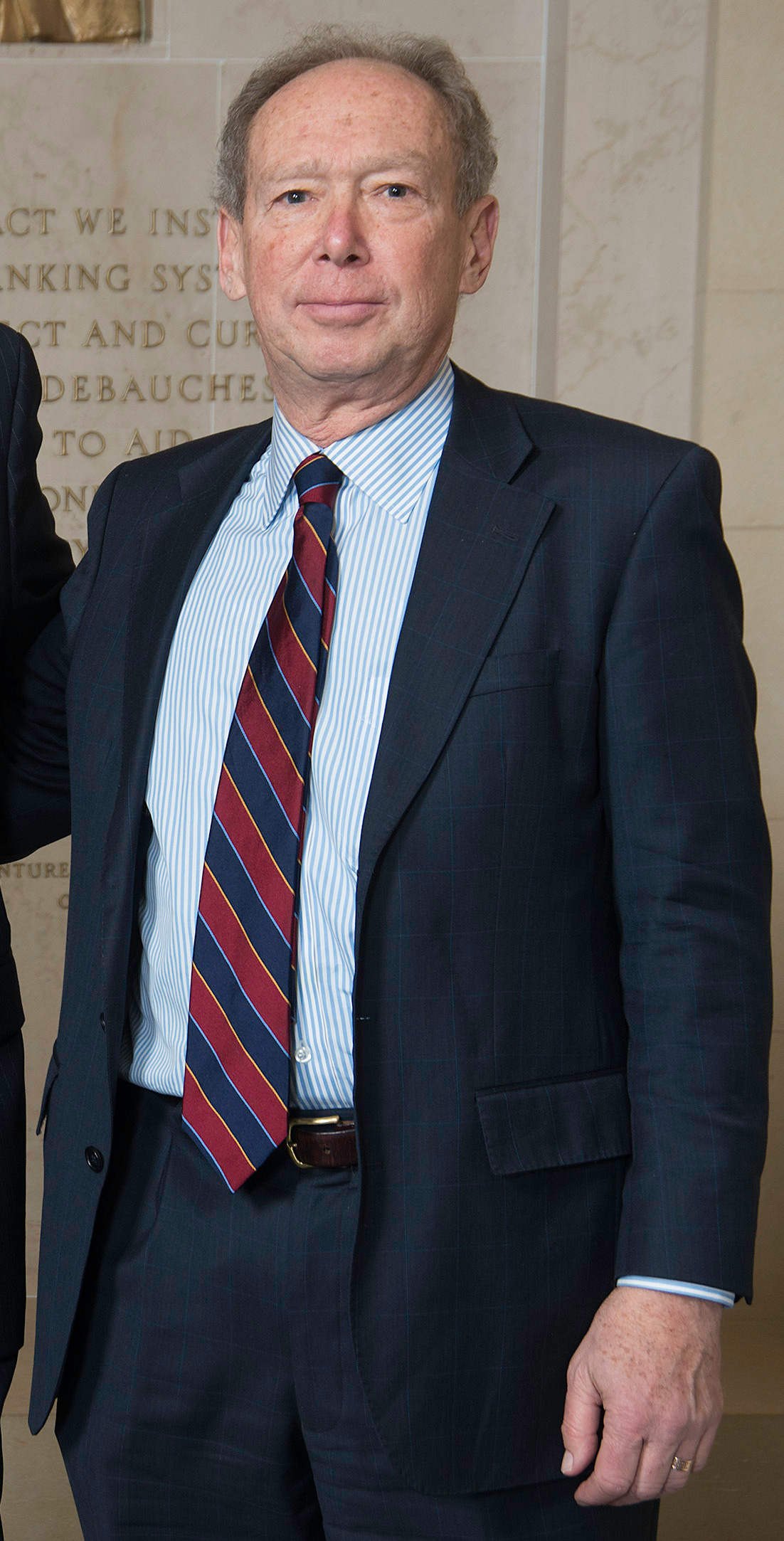
- Stern in 2014

11th President of the Federal Reserve Bank of Minneapolis
- In office March 16, 1985 – September 1, 2009
- Preceded by: E. Gerald Corrigan
- Succeeded by: Narayana Kocherlakota

Personal details
- Born: November 3, 1944 (age 81) San Luis Obispo, California, U.S.
- Education: Washington University (BA); Rice University (MA, PhD)

Gary Hilton Stern (born November 3, 1944) is an American economist and banker. On March 16, 1985, he took office as the eleventh chief executive of the Federal Reserve Bank of Minneapolis, and retired from the position on September 1, 2009.

== Life and career ==
Stern was born in San Luis Obispo, California. He holds an A.B. in economics from Washington University in St. Louis, and a Ph.D. in economics from Rice University, Houston.

Stern joined the Federal Reserve Bank of Minneapolis in January 1982 as senior vice president and director of research. In August 1983, he was given the additional responsibility of serving as the Bank's chief financial officer. Before joining the Minneapolis Bank, Stern was a partner in a New York-based economic consulting firm. He has also served on the faculties of Columbia University, Washington University, and New York University. Stern's previous experience includes seven years at the Federal Reserve Bank of New York, where his last assignment was as manager of the domestic research department.

Stern is chairman of the board of directors of the National Council on Economic Education and of the Northwest Area Foundation, and he serves on the board of trustees of Hamline University and of the Minneapolis College of Art and Design. He also serves on the board of the Carlson School of Management at the University of Minnesota, and he is the treasurer of the Minneapolis Club.

In 2004 Stern co-authored with Ron J. Feldman Too Big to Fail – The Hazards of Bank Bailouts with the foreword written by Paul A. Volcker.

== See also ==
- Federal Reserve System

Other offices
Preceded by E. Gerald Corrigan	President of the Federal Reserve Bank of Minneapolis; 1985–2009	Succeeded by Narayana Kocherlakota
