= Federal Reserve Bank of Minneapolis Helena Branch =

Coordinates: 46°35′38″N 112°02′18″W

The Federal Reserve Bank of Minneapolis Helena Branch is the only branch of the Federal Reserve Bank of Minneapolis. The branch was opened on 1 Feb. 1921. At the time of opening, the city had a population of 12,377 making it the smallest city to have a Federal Reserve bank or branch.

The branch is located in Helena, Montana, in a 69,350-square-foot (6,443 m^{2}) 3-level facility which sits on 4 acres.

== Current Board of Directors ==
The following people are on the board of directors as of 2013:

=== Appointed by the Federal Reserve Bank ===
Appointed by the Federal Reserve Bank
| Name | Title | Term Expires |
|---|---|---|
| Thomas R. Swenson | President and Chief Executive Officer; Bank of Montana and Bancorp of Montana Holding Company; Missoula, Montana | 2013 |
| Duane Kurokawa | President; Western Bank of Wolf Point; Wolf Point, Montana | 2014 |
| Barbara Stiffarm | Executive Director; Opportunity Link, Inc. Havre, Montana | 2015 |

=== Appointed by the Board of Governors ===
Appointed by the Board of Governors
| Name | Title | Term Expires |
|---|---|---|
| David B. Solberg (Chair) | Owner; Seven Blackfoot Ranch Company; Billings, Montana | 2014 |
| Marsha Goetting | Professor and Extension Family Economics Specialist; Montana State University; Bozeman, Montana | 2015 |

== See also ==
- Federal Reserve Act
- Federal Reserve System
- Federal Reserve Districts
- Federal Reserve Branches
- Federal Reserve Bank of Minneapolis
- Structure of the Federal Reserve System
