= Timothy Massad =

American lawyer

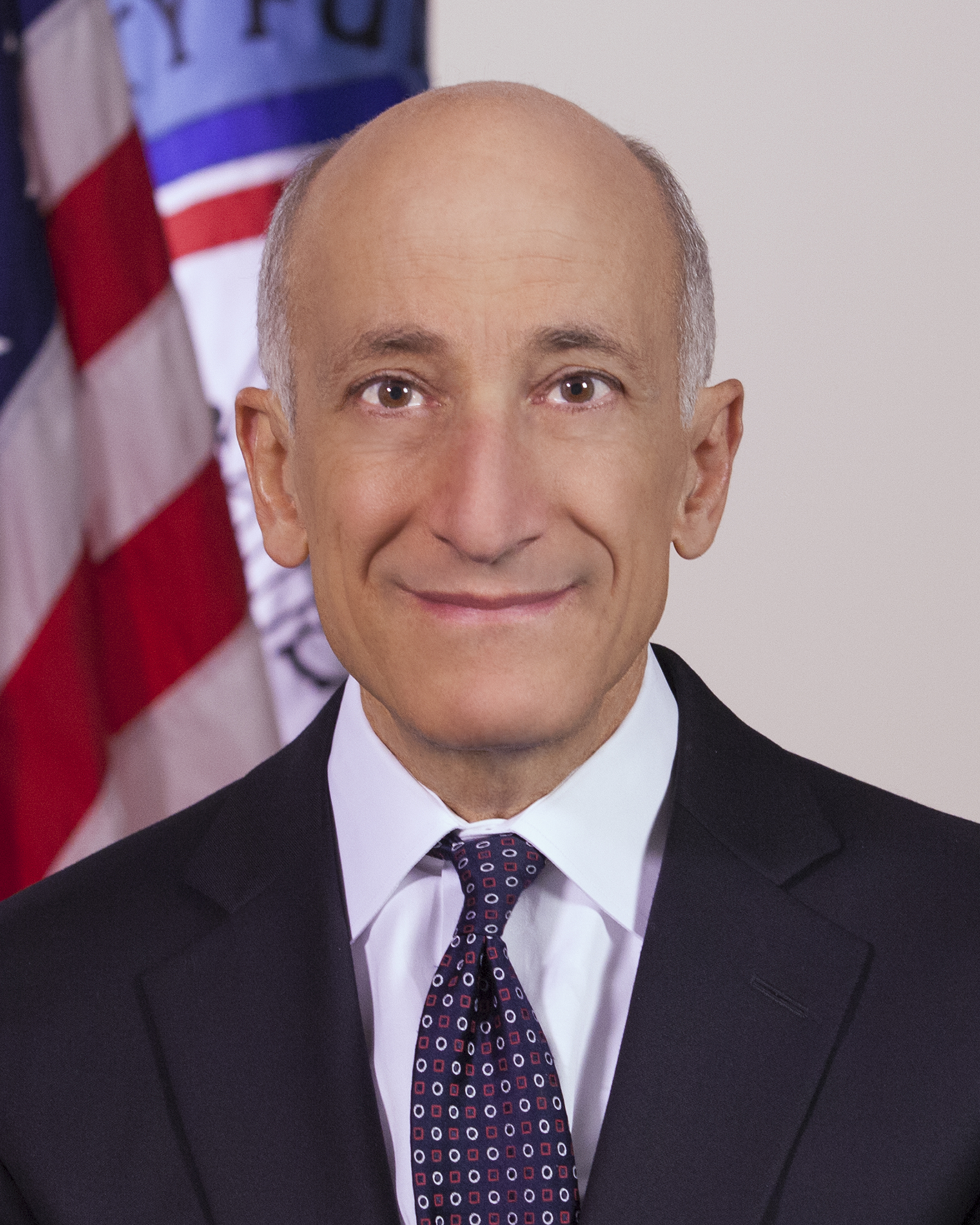
- Official portrait, 2014

12th Chairman of the Commodity Futures Trading Commission
- In office June 5, 2014 – January 20, 2017
- President: Barack Obama
- Preceded by: Mark Wetjen (acting)
- Succeeded by: J. Christopher Giancarlo

Assistant Secretary of the Treasury for Financial Stability
- In office June 30, 2011 – June 5, 2014
- President: Barack Obama
- Preceded by: Herbert M. Allison
- Succeeded by: Position abolished

Personal details
- Born: July 30, 1956 (age 70) New Orleans, Louisiana, U.S.
- Party: Democratic
- Education: Harvard University (BA, JD)

Timothy George Massad (born July 30, 1956) is an American lawyer and government official who served as the chairman of the Commodity Futures Trading Commission (CFTC) under President Barack Obama. He had previously been Assistant Secretary for Financial Stability at the United States Department of the Treasury, where he oversaw the Troubled Asset Relief Program (TARP) created by the U.S. government in response to the 2008 financial crisis.

Massad earned his undergraduate degree at Harvard University in 1978. After stints working for Ralph Nader and the AFL–CIO, he returned to Harvard to earn a J.D. degree in 1981. He then began a 25-year career as a corporate lawyer at the firm Cravath, Swaine & Moore, where he became an expert on corporate finance and derivatives.

Massad briefly joined the staff of TARP's Congressional Oversight Panel before moving to the Office of Financial Stability as chief counsel. In September 2010 he was named acting Assistant Secretary for Financial Stability. The U.S. Senate confirmed him to the position in June 2011. In November 2013, President Barack Obama nominated him to be CFTC chairman. The Senate confirmed him in June 2014.

== Early life and education ==
Massad was born July 30, 1956, in New Orleans, Louisiana. His parents were the children of Lebanese immigrants. His mother, Delores Jean Razook, was a homemaker, and his father, Alexander Hamilton Massad, was an executive in the oil industry, mostly at Mobil. In Timothy's earlier years the family moved often because of his father's career, but in 1968 they settled in Darien, Connecticut, where the parents remained for 18 years. Massad has a brother and a sister.

Massad graduated from Darien High School in 1974 as a National Merit Scholar and interned with a Congressman. He then enrolled at Harvard University, earning a bachelor's degree magna cum laude in social studies in 1978.

After graduating from college, Massad went to work for the prominent activist Ralph Nader; he also worked for the AFL–CIO labor union federation. During this time he was active in the anti-nuclear power movement, organizing with Donald K. Ross a large protest in Washington, D.C., on May 6, 1979, in the wake of the Three Mile Island accident.

== Legal career ==
Dissatisfied with his employers' grasp of business and economics, Massad enrolled at Harvard Law School in 1981. In 1983 he helped organize a petition against permitting professors to count class participation toward students' grades. He graduated in 1984 and began his 25-year career at the law firm Cravath, Swaine & Moore that same year.

At Cravath he became a generalist in corporate law with focus on corporate finance and international business. He was mostly based in New York City, but he also worked at Cravath's London office for a year and co-managed the Hong Kong office from 1998 to 2002. In 2007 he headed Cravath's India practice. During his time at Cravath he became an expert on derivatives and securities law, co-writing with other Cravath lawyers the ISDA Master Agreement that governs most derivatives contracts between institutions.

== Government service ==
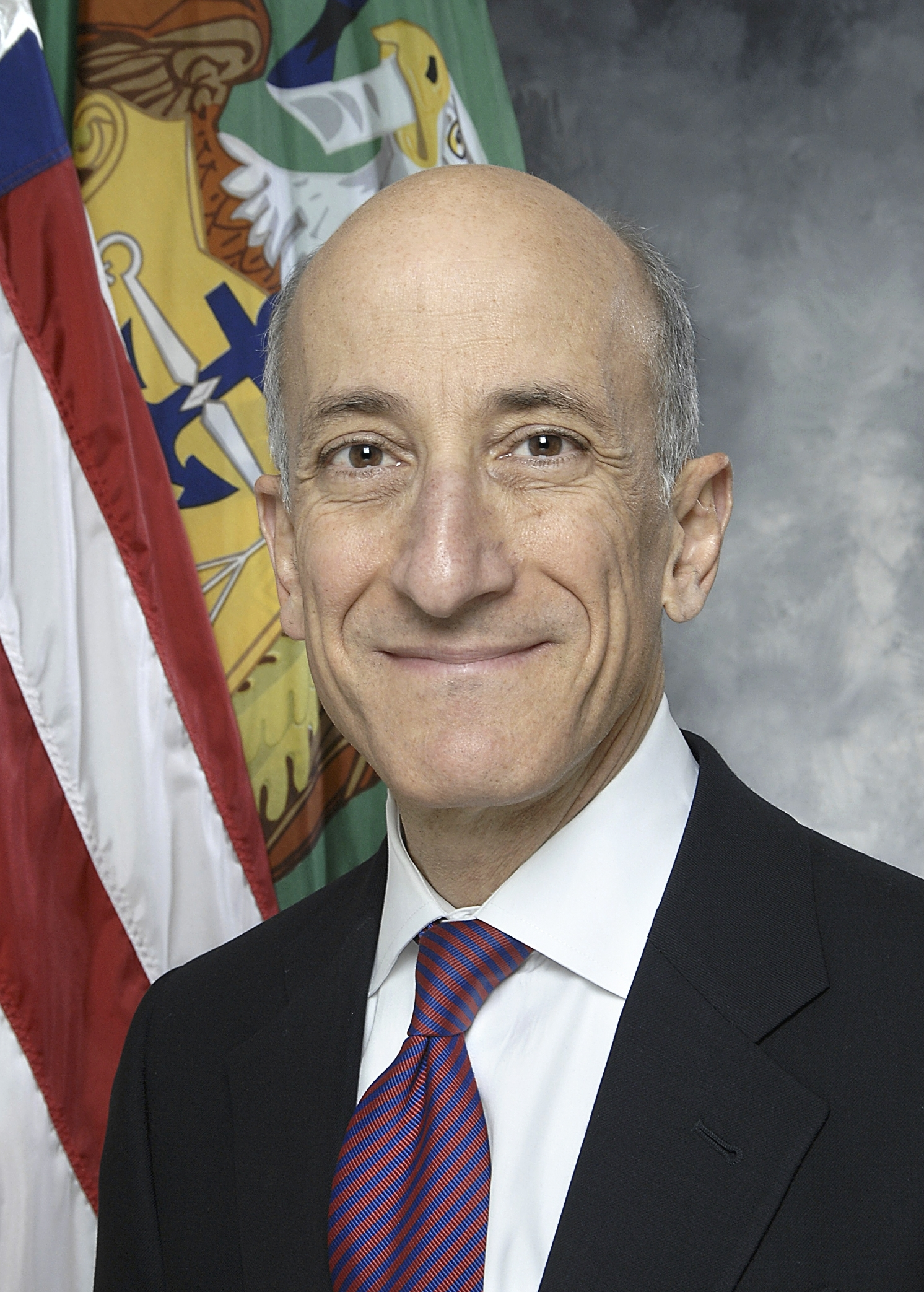
Massad's Treasury portrait

The Emergency Economic Stabilization Act of 2008 was enacted in October 2008 in response to the 2008 financial crisis. It created the Office of Financial Stability within the Treasury Department to administer the Troubled Asset Relief Program (TARP), a $700-billion bailout fund for the financial industry.

Massad became involved in TARP when he called a friend, Damon Silvers, to congratulate him on being named to the program's Congressional Oversight Panel. During this conversation, Silvers recruited him to join the panel's staff. Massad took a leave of absence from Cravath from December 2008 to February 2009 to be a pro bono legal adviser to the panel.

Later, when Treasury officials were looking for a chief counsel for the Office of Financial Stability, Silvers recommended Massad. Massad left Cravath in May 2009 to take the position. Following the departure of Herbert M. Allison, the Assistant Secretary of the Treasury for Financial Stability, Massad was named acting Assistant Secretary beginning in September 2010. The U.S. Senate confirmed his appointment as Assistant Secretary in June 2011. In this role he has supervised the gradual wind-down of TARP.

Massad announced in October 2013 that he would resign as Assistant Secretary. The next month, President Barack Obama announced he would nominate Massad to be chairman of the Commodity Futures Trading Commission, the federal agency that regulates derivatives. That post became vacant on Jan. 3, 2014, when Gary Gensler stepped down. The Senate confirmed him on June 3, 2014. He was sworn in on June 5.

== Political activities ==
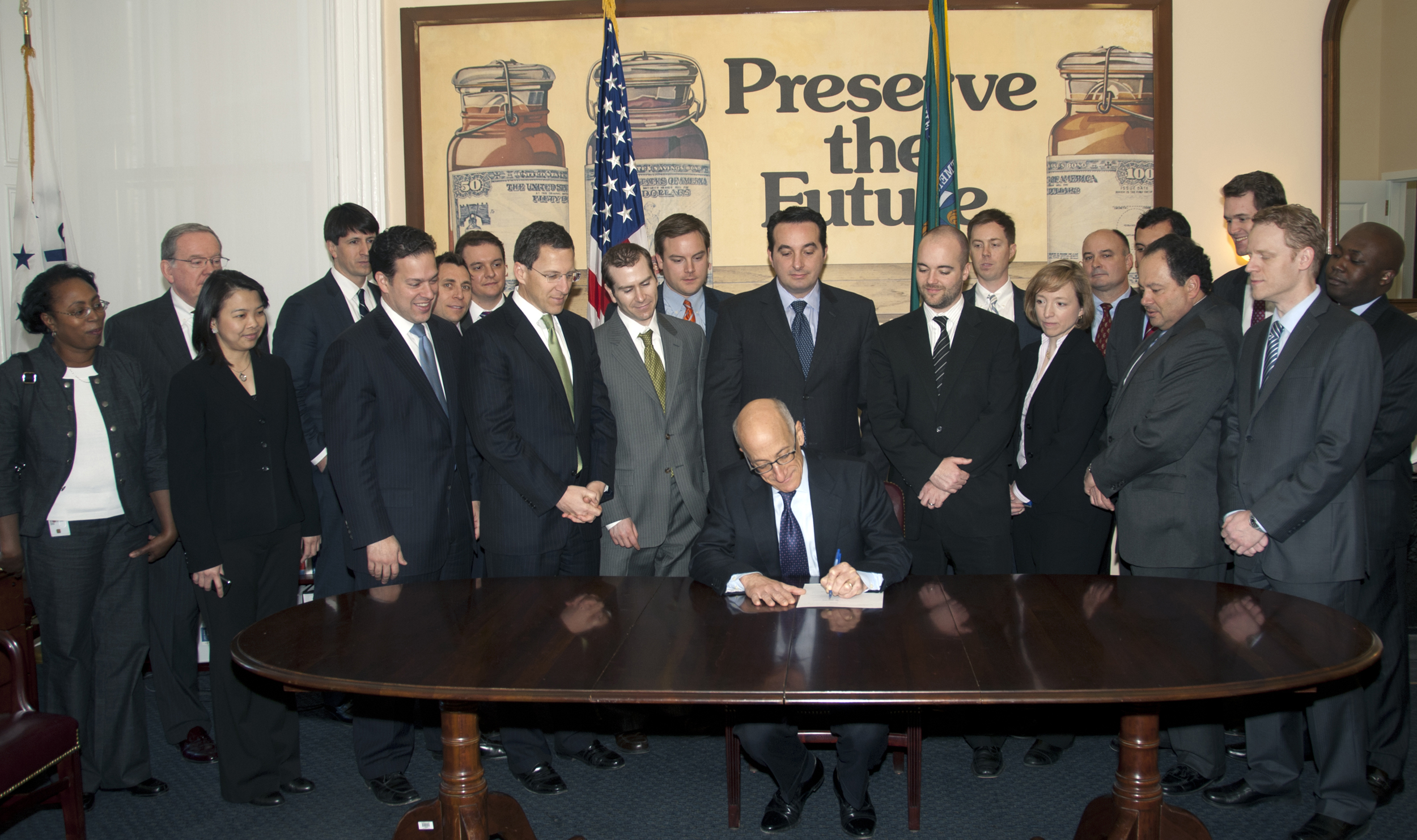
Assistant Secretary of the Treasury for Financial Stability Massad confirms receipt of the proceeds from the sale of Treasury's final shares of AIG common stock

During law school Massad worked on Michael Dukakis's successful 1982 campaign for Governor of Massachusetts. During the 1988 presidential election Massad again supported Dukakis, whom he described as his political hero. Massad was a voting delegate at the 1988 Democratic National Convention, where Dukakis was nominated for president, and took a leave of absence from Cravath to serve as Connecticut director of the Dukakis campaign for the general election. Dukakis lost Connecticut, and the election, to George H. W. Bush.

Massad is a longtime donor to the Democratic National Committee and to Democratic candidates, including John Kerry in the 2004 presidential election and Obama and Hillary Clinton in the 2008 presidential election.

== Personal life ==
Massad is an accomplished cook. In his early years at Cravath he spent his vacations as a volunteer apprentice at the Manhattan restaurant Bouley. He is known at Treasury for running a baking contest among his staff.

Massad has a wife and two children. They live in Washington, D.C.

== See also ==
- List of Lebanese people in the United States

Political offices
Preceded by Mark Wetjen; Acting	Chair of the Commodity Futures Trading Commission; 2014–2017	Succeeded by J. Christopher Giancarlo
